= List of townlands of County Donegal =

This is a sortable table of the approximately 2,787 townlands in County Donegal, Ireland.

Duplicate names occur where there is more than one townland with the same name in the county. Names marked in bold typeface are towns and villages, and the word Town appears for those entries in the Acres column.

== Townland list ==
Townland	Acres	Barony	Civil parish	Poor law union
Abbernadoorny	62	Banagh	Killymard	Donegal
Abbey Island	17	Tirhugh	Kilbarron	Ballyshannon
Abbeylands	173	Tirhugh	Kilbarron	Ballyshannon
Adderville	752	Inishowen East	Clonmany	Inishowen
Adderwal	722	Boylagh	Inishkeel	Glenties
Admiran	135	Raphoe	Stranorlar	Stranorlar
Aghadachor	271	Kilmacrenan	Mevagh	Millford
Aghadaghly	96	Kilmacrenan	Clondavaddog	Millford
Aghadowey	402	Tirhugh	Drumhome	Donegal
Aghadreenan	536	Kilmacrenan	Clondavaddog	Millford
Aghafoy	101	Tirhugh	Templecarn	Donegal
Aghaglassan	2,119	Inishowen East	Culdaff	Inishowen
Aghahull	72	Kilmacrenan	Aughnish	Millford
Aghalattive	387	Kilmacrenan	Clondahorky	Dunfanaghy
Aghalatty	484	Kilmacrenan	Mevagh	Millford
Aghalenty	111	Kilmacrenan	Aghanunshin	Letterkenny
Aghalough	148	Tirhugh	Templecarn	Donegal
Aghangaddy Glebe	528	Kilmacrenan	Aughnish	Millford
Aghanursan	119	Kilmacrenan	Tullyfern	Millford
Aghasheil	28	Raphoe	Stranorlar	Stranorlar
Aghatubbrid	576	Inishowen East	Culdaff	Inishowen
Aghavannan Far	179	Kilmacrenan	Killygarvan	Millford
Aghavannan Near	102	Kilmacrenan	Killygarvan	Millford
Aghaveagh	1,225	Raphoe	Kilteevoge	Stranorlar
Aghawee	124	Raphoe	Clonleigh	Strabane
Aghawoney	212	Kilmacrenan	Kilmacrenan	Millford
Aghayeevoge	346	Banagh	Killybegs Upper	Glenties
Aghilly and Lenynarnan	377	Inishowen West	Fahan Lower	Inishowen
Aghlehard	516	Raphoe	Leck	Letterkenny
Aghlem	234	Tirhugh	Donegal	Donegal
Aghnahoo Glebe	231	Tirhugh	Templecarn	Donegal
Aghnakeeragh	76	Raphoe	Raphoe	Strabane
Aghragh	726	Banagh	Glencolumbkille	Glenties
Aighan	132	Banagh	Killaghtee	Donegal
Aighe	758	Banagh	Inishkeel	Glenties
Alla	213	Tirhugh	Kilbarron	Ballyshannon
Allagh Island	4	Kilmacrenan	Tullaghobegly	Dunfanaghy
Alt Lower	184	Raphoe	Urney	Strabane
Alt Upper	614	Raphoe	Urney	Strabane
Altadoo	487	Banagh	Killymard	Donegal
Altadush	525	Kilmacrenan	Conwal	Letterkenny
Altaghaderry	557	Raphoe	Killea	Londonderry
Altahalla	734	Inishowen East	Clonmany	Inishowen
Altahan	1,235	Raphoe	Kilteevoge	Stranorlar
Altan	1,443	Kilmacrenan	Tullaghobegly	Dunfanaghy
Altashane (or Cabadooey)	1,591	Inishowen East	Donagh	Inishowen
Altaskin	107	Raphoe	Taughboyne	Strabane
Altatraght	647	Raphoe	Kilteevoge	Stranorlar
Altclogh	275	Banagh	Glencolumbkille	Glenties
Altcor	537	Banagh	Inver	Donegal
Altilow	1,092	Banagh	Killymard	Donegal
Altinierin	913	Kilmacrenan	Conwal	Stranorlar
Altnagapple	454	Banagh	Killybegs Lower	Glenties
Altnagapple (or Mulmosog)	766	Banagh	Inishkeel	Glenties
Altnapaste	2,362	Raphoe	Kilteevoge	Stranorlar
Anna Islan	5	Boylagh	Templecrone	Glenties
Annagary	1,860	Boylagh	Templecrone	Glenties
Annagh	826	Inishowen East	Clonmany	Inishowen
Annaslee	322	Inishowen West	Fahan Upper	Londonderry
Anny Far and Near	378	Kilmacrenan	Killygarvan	Millford
Aphort	340	Boylagh	Templecrone	Glenties
Arbatt	1,007	Raphoe	Kilteevoge	Stranorlar
Ardachrin	1,369	Kilmacrenan	Gartan	Letterkenny
Ardaganny	416	Raphoe	Leck	Letterkenny
Ardagh	409	Inishowen East	Clonmany	Inishowen
Ardagh	822	Raphoe	Taughboyne	Strabane
Ardaght Glebe	119	Banagh	Inver	Donegal
Ardahee	56	Raphoe	Leck	Letterkenny
**Ardara**	Town	Banagh	Killybegs Lower	Glenties
Ardara	482	Banagh	Killybegs Lower	Glenties
Ardaravan	421	Inishowen West	Fahan Lower	Inishowen
Ardarawer	71	Kilmacrenan	Aghanunshin	Letterkenny
Ardatowel	134	Tirhugh	Donegal	Donegal
Ardaturr	86	Kilmacrenan	Gartan	Letterkenny
Ardaturr Mountain	539	Kilmacrenan	Gartan	Letterkenny
Ardbane	321	Banagh	Inver	Donegal
Ardbane	334	Kilmacrenan	Mevagh	Millford
Ardbane (or Laghy Barr)	357	Tirhugh	Drumhome	Donegal
Ardchicken	61	Tirhugh	Donegal	Donegal
Ardee	363	Raphoe	Allsaints	Londonderry
Ardeelan Lower	110	Tirhugh	Drumhome	Ballyshannon
Ardeelan Upper	128	Tirhugh	Drumhome	Ballyshannon
Ardeevin	96	Tirhugh	Donegal	Donegal
Ardeskin	44	Tirhugh	Donegal	Donegal
Ardfarn	1,056	Tirhugh	Inishmacsaint	Ballyshannon
Ardgillew	100	Tirhugh	Kilbarron	Ballyshannon
Ardglass	85	Kilmacrenan	Clondavaddog	Millford
Ardinawark	324	Tirhugh	Donegal	Donegal
Ardlenagh	64	Tirhugh	Donegal	Donegal
Ardlougher	184	Banagh	Killybegs Lower	Glenties
Ardloughill	376	Tirhugh	Inishmacsaint	Ballyshannon
Ardmalin	1,980	Inishowen East	Clonca	Inishowen
Ardmeen	773	Boylagh	Templecrone	Glenties
Ardmore	721	Inishowen West	Muff	Londonderry
Ardnableask	152	Tirhugh	Donegal	Donegal
Ardnaditian	84	Raphoe	Raymoghy	Letterkenny
Ardnagalliagh	81	Tirhugh	Drumhome	Ballyshannon
Ardnagannagh	195	Raphoe	Donaghmore	Stranorlar
Ardnagappary	870	Kilmacrenan	Tullaghobegly	Dunfanaghy
Ardnaglass	71	Tirhugh	Templecarn	Donegal
Ardnaglass	264	Raphoe	Clonleigh	Strabane
Ardnaoghill	59	Raphoe	Killea	Londonderry
Ardnaree	172	Kilmacrenan	Tullyfern	Millford
Ardnasool	114	Raphoe	Clonleigh	Strabane
Ardpattan	95	Tirhugh	Kilbarron	Ballyshannon
Ardrumman	500	Kilmacrenan	Aughnish	Letterkenny
Ards	559	Kilmacrenan	Clondahorky	Dunfanaghy
Ards Beg	1,611	Kilmacrenan	Tullaghobegly	Dunfanaghy
Ards Big	511	Kilmacrenan	Conwal	Millford
Ards Little	206	Kilmacrenan	Conwal	Millford
Ards More	160	Kilmacrenan	Tullaghobegly	Dunfanaghy
Ardsmore Mountain	425	Kilmacrenan	Tullaghobegly	Dunfanaghy
Ardun	250	Boylagh	Inishkeel	Glenties
Arduns	2,901	Kilmacrenan	Tullaghobegly	Dunfanaghy
Ardvally	160	Banagh	Killybegs Lower	Glenties
Ardvarnock Glebe	266	Raphoe	Raphoe	Strabane
Arlands	184	Boylagh	Templecrone	Glenties
**Arryheernabin**	Town	Kilmacrenan	Clondavaddog	Millford
Arryheernabin	434	Kilmacrenan	Clondavaddog	Millford
Artikellys	144	Raphoe	Convoy	Stranorlar
Ash Island	2	Tirhugh	Templecarn	Donegal
Attatantee	1,190	Kilmacrenan	Tullaghobegly	Dunfanaghy
Attinadague	579	Kilmacrenan	Gartan	Letterkenny
Aughagault	180	Raphoe	Convoy	Stranorlar
Aughagault Big	266	Raphoe	Convoy	Stranorlar
Aughkeely	919	Raphoe	Convoy	Stranorlar
Aughnish	682	Kilmacrenan	Aughnish	Millford
Aughnish Isle	66	Kilmacrenan	Aughnish	Millford
Aught	1,661	Inishowen West	Muff	Londonderry
Augullies	322	Boylagh	Templecrone	Glenties
Avaltygort	197	Raphoe	Donaghmore	Stranorlar
Backhill	13	Raphoe	Clonleigh	Strabane
Backland	25	Raphoe	Clonleigh	Strabane
Backlees	121	Raphoe	Stranorlar	Stranorlar
Balbane	712	Banagh	Killybegs Upper	Glenties
Ballagh	606	Inishowen East	Clonca	Inishowen
Ballaghderg	237	Kilmacrenan	Conwal	Letterkenny
Ballard	762	Banagh	Glencolumbkille	Glenties
Balleeghan	858	Inishowen East	Moville Lower	Inishowen
Balleeghan	313	Raphoe	Raymoghy	Letterkenny
Balleeghan Lower	265	Inishowen East	Clonca	Inishowen
Balleeghan Lower	639	Inishowen East	Culdaff	Inishowen
Balleeghan Upper	97	Inishowen East	Clonca	Inishowen
Balleeghan Upper	1,006	Inishowen East	Culdaff	Inishowen
Balleelaghan	668	Inishowen East	Clonca	Inishowen
Ballina	83	Kilmacrenan	Clondavaddog	Millford
Ballinbrocky and Ballincrick	449	Kilmacrenan	Clondavaddog	Millford
Ballincrick/Ballinbrocky	449	Kilmacrenan	Clondavaddog	Millford
**Ballindrait**	Town	Raphoe	Clonleigh	Strabane
Ballindrait	103	Raphoe	Clonleigh	Strabane
Ballinlough	938	Inishowen West	Mintiaghs or Barr of Inch	Inishowen
Ballintemple	259	Kilmacrenan	Tullaghobegly	Dunfanaghy
Ballintlieve	521	Inishowen West	Mintiaghs or Barr of Inch	Inishowen
Ballintooey	205	Tirhugh	Drumhome	Donegal
**Ballintra**	Town	Tirhugh	Drumhome	Ballyshannon
Ballintra	34	Tirhugh	Drumhome	Ballyshannon
Ballintra	1,676	Boylagh	Templecrone	Glenties
Balloor	425	Kilmacrenan	Clondavaddog	Millford
Ballyalla	156	Tirhugh	Drumhome	Donegal
Ballyannan	1,306	Inishowen West	Desertegny	Inishowen
Ballyara	900	Banagh	Killybegs Upper	Glenties
Ballyargus	1,368	Inishowen East	Moville Upper	Inishowen
Ballyarr	446	Kilmacrenan	Tullyfern	Millford
Ballyarr Glebe	231	Kilmacrenan	Tullyfern	Millford
Ballyarrell	862	Raphoe	Donaghmore	Stranorlar
Ballybegly	237	Raphoe	Allsaints	Londonderry
Ballybegly Little	162	Raphoe	Allsaints	Letterkenny
Ballybobaneen	401	Raphoe	Kilteevoge	Stranorlar
Ballybodonnell	184	Banagh	Killaghtee	Donegal
Ballyboe	78	Kilmacrenan	Clondahorky	Dunfanaghy
Ballyboe	442	Kilmacrenan	Raymunterdoney	Dunfanaghy
Ballyboe	131	Raphoe	Leck	Letterkenny
Ballyboe	75	Raphoe	Raymoghy	Letterkenny
Ballyboe	90	Raphoe	Allsaints	Londonderry
Ballyboe	15	Kilmacrenan	Killygarvan	Millford
Ballyboe	69	Kilmacrenan	Tullyfern	Millford
Ballyboe	168	Raphoe	Taughboyne	Strabane
Ballyboe	65	Raphoe	Convoy	Stranorlar
Ballyboe Glencar	146	Kilmacrenan	Conwal	Letterkenny
Ballyboe Lisnenan	30	Kilmacrenan	Conwal	Letterkenny
Ballyboe Mountain	1,091	Kilmacrenan	Raymunterdoney	Dunfanaghy
Ballyboencurragh	142	Kilmacrenan	Aghanunshin	Letterkenny
**Ballybofey**	Town	Raphoe	Stranorlar	Stranorlar
Ballybofey	453	Raphoe	Stranorlar	Stranorlar
Ballybogan	124	Raphoe	Clonleigh	Strabane
Ballybokeel	111	Kilmacrenan	Aughnish	Millford
Ballybolagan and Drumavohy	350	Kilmacrenan	Clondavaddog	Millford
Ballybolauder	275	Kilmacrenan	Conwal	Letterkenny
Ballybotemple	137	Raphoe	Kilteevoge	Stranorlar
Ballyboyle	107	Banagh	Killymard	Donegal
Ballyboyle Island	30	Banagh	Killymard	Donegal
Ballybrack	448	Inishowen East	Moville Lower	Inishowen
Ballybrollaghan	366	Banagh	Inver	Donegal
Ballybulgan	174	Tirhugh	Drumhome	Donegal
Ballybun	327	Raphoe	Donaghmore	Strabane
Ballybuninabber	1,222	Kilmacrenan	Kilmacrenan	Millford
Ballycallan	604	Kilmacrenan	Clondavaddog	Millford
Ballycharry	996	Inishowen East	Culdaff	Inishowen
Ballyconnell	598	Kilmacrenan	Raymunterdoney	Dunfanaghy
Ballyconnelly	149	Raphoe	Leck	Letterkenny
Ballyconnelly	562	Kilmacrenan	Tullyfern	Millford
Ballycramsy	146	Inishowen East	Clonca	Inishowen
Ballycroy	226	Banagh	Killaghtee	Donegal
Ballycushion	104	Raphoe	Taughboyne	Londonderry
Ballydermot	358	Tirhugh	Drumhome	Donegal
Ballydevitt	253	Banagh	Killymard	Donegal
Ballydevitt Beg	202	Banagh	Killymard	Donegal
Ballyederlan	307	Banagh	Killaghtee	Donegal
Ballyederowen	629	Inishowen West	Burt	Londonderry
Ballyelly	102	Kilmacrenan	Aughnish	Millford
Ballygallan	1,008	Raphoe	Conwal	Stranorlar
Ballygawley	71	Raphoe	Conwal	Letterkenny
Ballygay	349	Kilmacrenan	Tullyfern	Millford
Ballygonigan	154	Raphoe	Donaghmore	Strabane
Ballygorman	790	Inishowen East	Clonca	Inishowen
Ballygreen	151	Kilmacrenan	Aughnish	Millford
Ballyhanna	221	Tirhugh	Inishmacsaint	Ballyshannon
Ballyhasky	314	Raphoe	Allsaints	Londonderry
Ballyheerin	291	Kilmacrenan	Clondavaddog	Millford
Ballyhiernan	825	Kilmacrenan	Clondavaddog	Millford
Ballyholey Far	622	Raphoe	Raphoe	Letterkenny
Ballyholey Near	197	Raphoe	Raphoe	Strabane
Ballyhork	243	Kilmacrenan	Clondavaddog	Millford
Ballyiriston	621	Boylagh	Inishkeel	Glenties
Ballykeeran	801	Kilmacrenan	Kilmacrenan	Millford
Ballykenny	278	Inishowen East	Clonca	Inishowen
Ballykenny	151	Kilmacrenan	Tullyfern	Millford
Ballykergan	1,319	Raphoe	Kilteevoge	Stranorlar
Ballykillowen	1,066	Tirhugh	Drumhome	Donegal
Ballykinard	103	Kilmacrenan	Clondavaddog	Millford
Ballylast	7	Raphoe	Clonleigh	Strabane
Ballylast	155	Raphoe	Urney	Strabane
Ballylawn	746	Inishowen East	Moville Upper	Inishowen
Ballylawn	428	Raphoe	Raymoghy	Letterkenny
Ballylennan	334	Raphoe	Taughboyne	Strabane
Ballylevin	196	Raphoe	Raymoghy	Letterkenny
**Ballyliffin**	Town	Inishowen East	Clonmany	Inishowen
Ballyliffin	594	Inishowen East	Clonmany	Inishowen
Ballylin	465	Kilmacrenan	Aughnish	Millford
Ballylosky	705	Inishowen East	Donagh	Inishowen
Ballyloughan	422	Banagh	Killaghtee	Glenties
Ballymacahil	382	Banagh	Inver	Donegal
Ballymacarry	556	Inishowen West	Fahan Lower	Inishowen
Ballymacarry Lower	225	Inishowen West	Fahan Lower	Inishowen
Ballymacarthur	794	Inishowen East	Moville Lower	Inishowen
Ballymacavany	634	Tirhugh	Templecarn	Donegal
Ballymacaward	605	Tirhugh	Kilbarron	Ballyshannon
Ballymackilduff	364	Boylagh	Inishkeel	Glenties
Ballymacmoriarty	860	Inishowen East	Clonmany	Inishowen
Ballymacool	470	Kilmacrenan	Conwal	Letterkenny
Ballymacphadin	256	Banagh	Kilcar	Glenties
Ballymagahy Mountain	140	Kilmacrenan	Clondavaddog	Millford
Ballymagahy North	126	Kilmacrenan	Clondavaddog	Millford
Ballymagahy South	197	Kilmacrenan	Clondavaddog	Millford
Ballymagan Upr & Lwr & Clonblosk	481	Inishowen West	Fahan Lower	Inishowen
Ballymagaraghy	387	Inishowen East	Culdaff	Inishowen
Ballymagaraghy	268	Inishowen East	Moville Lower	Inishowen
Ballymagig (or Barrack)	140	Raphoe	Conwal	Letterkenny
Ballymagowan	298	Banagh	Killaghtee	Donegal
Ballymagowan Lower	267	Kilmacrenan	Clondavaddog	Millford
Ballymagowan Upper	340	Kilmacrenan	Clondavaddog	Millford
Ballymagrorty	1,101	Tirhugh	Drumhome	Ballyshannon
Ballymagrorty Irish	410	Tirhugh	Drumhome	Ballyshannon
Ballymagrorty Scotch	534	Tirhugh	Drumhome	Ballyshannon
Ballymaleel	156	Kilmacrenan	Aghanunshin	Letterkenny
Ballymaquin	186	Kilmacrenan	Gartan	Letterkenny
Ballymichael	166	Kilmacrenan	Clondavaddog	Millford
Ballymonaster	143	Raphoe	Clonleigh	Strabane
Ballymoney	376	Inishowen West	Burt	Londonderry
Ballymoon	309	Banagh	Kilcar	Glenties
Ballymore	927	Banagh	Glencolumbkille	Glenties
Ballymore Lower	343	Kilmacrenan	Clondahorky	Dunfanaghy
Ballymore Upper	160	Kilmacrenan	Clondahorky	Dunfanaghy
Ballymunterhiggin	754	Tirhugh	Inishmacsaint	Ballyshannon
Ballynabreen	245	Raphoe	Clonleigh	Strabane
Ballynacarrick	859	Tirhugh	Drumhome	Ballyshannon
Ballynacarrick	141	Tirhugh	Kilbarron	Ballyshannon
Ballynacarrick, Barr of	475	Tirhugh	Drumhome	Ballyshannon
Ballynacor	700	Raphoe	Donaghmore	Stranorlar
Ballynacraig	348	Kilmacrenan	Tullaghobegly	Dunfanaghy
Ballynaglack	197	Raphoe	Stranorlar	Stranorlar
Ballynaglogh	101	Tirhugh	Kilbarron	Ballyshannon
Ballynahone	882	Inishowen West	Fahan Upper	Londonderry
Ballynakeeloge	258	Inishowen West	Fahan Lower	Inishowen
Ballynakillew Mountain	1,470	Tirhugh	Drumhome	Donegal
Ballynakilly	408	Kilmacrenan	Conwal	Letterkenny
Ballynakilly	686	Inishowen West	Inch	Londonderry
Ballynally	756	Inishowen East	Moville Lower	Inishowen
Ballynaman	114	Raphoe	Donaghmore	Stranorlar
Ballynaman	692	Raphoe	Kilteevoge	Stranorlar
Ballynarry	640	Inishowen West	Fahan Lower	Inishowen
Ballynascall	94	Kilmacrenan	Gartan	Letterkenny
Ballynashannagh	214	Kilmacrenan	Clondavaddog	Millford
Ballynaslost	303	Kilmacrenan	Clondavaddog	Millford
Ballynatone	272	Raphoe	Kilteevoge	Stranorlar
Ballynawall and Drum	108	Kilmacrenan	Clondavaddog	Millford
Ballyness	349	Kilmacrenan	Tullaghobegly	Dunfanaghy
Ballyness Mountain	1,306	Kilmacrenan	Tullaghobegly	Dunfanaghy
Ballyoghagan	342	Kilmacrenan	Mevagh	Millford
Ballyraine	315	Kilmacrenan	Conwal	Letterkenny
Ballyrattan	837	Inishowen East	Moville Upper	Inishowen
**Ballyroosky**	Town	Kilmacrenan	Clondavaddog	Millford
Ballyroosky	289	Kilmacrenan	Clondavaddog	Millford
Ballyroosky Island	8	Kilmacrenan	Clondavaddog	Millford
Ballyruddelly (or Lismintan)	377	Tirhugh	Drumhome	Donegal
Ballysaggart	125	Banagh	Killaghtee	Donegal
Ballyscanlan Lower	361	Kilmacrenan	Kilmacrenan	Millford
Ballyscanlan Upper	404	Kilmacrenan	Kilmacrenan	Millford
**Ballyshannon**	Town	Tirhugh	Inishmacsaint	Ballyshannon
**Ballyshannon**	Town	Tirhugh	Kilbarron	Ballyshannon
Ballystrang	442	Raphoe	Conwal	Letterkenny
Balwoges	524	Banagh	Killaghtee	Donegal
Banganboy	619	Boylagh	Inishkeel	Glenties
Bangort	1,269	Banagh	Glencolumbkille	Glenties
Bannus	99	Tirhugh	Templecarn	Donegal
Barkillew	246	Banagh	Inishkeel	Glenties
Barnahone and Owenkillew	584	Inishowen West	Fahan Lower	Inishowen
Barnes Lower	754	Kilmacrenan	Kilmacrenan	Millford
Barnes Upper	1,082	Kilmacrenan	Kilmacrenan	Millford
Barnesyneilly	542	Tirhugh	Drumhome	Donegal
Barr of Ballyconnell (or Devlin)	1,129	Kilmacrenan	Raymunterdoney	Dunfanaghy
Barr of Ballynacarrick	475	Tirhugh	Drumhome	Ballyshannon
Barr of Kilmackilvenny (or Monreagh)	930	Inishowen West	Fahan Upper	Londonderry
Barrack	70	Kilmacrenan	Conwal	Letterkenny
Barrack (or Ballymagig)	140	Raphoe	Conwal	Letterkenny
Baskill	686	Inishowen East	Culdaff	Inishowen
Bauville Keeloges and Clonglash	727	Inishowen West	Fahan Lower	Inishowen
Bavan	395	Banagh	Kilcar	Glenties
Bayhill	58	Kilmacrenan	Tullyfern	Millford
Baylet	265	Inishowen West	Inch	Londonderry
Beagh	380	Boylagh	Inishkeel	Glenties
Beaghmore	607	Boylagh	Inishkeel	Glenties
Beaugreen Glebe	120	Banagh	Killaghtee	Donegal
Beefan	112	Banagh	Glencolumbkille	Glenties
Beefan & Garvcross Mtn.	228	Banagh	Glencolumbkille	Glenties
Beefpark	53	Banagh	Killymard	Donegal
Befflaght	1,725	Boylagh	Lettermacaward	Glenties
Behy	869	Tirhugh	Kilbarron	Ballyshannon
Belalt	593	Raphoe	Donaghmore	Strabane
Belalt North	1,354	Tirhugh	Templecarn	Donegal
Belalt South	1,350	Tirhugh	Templecarn	Donegal
Belcruit	1,398	Boylagh	Templecrone	Glenties
Bellaganny	48	Banagh	Inishkeel	Glenties
Bellanaboy (or Derrynacarrow East)	99	Boylagh	Lettermacaward	Glenties
Bellanamore	923	Boylagh	Inishkeel	Glenties
Bellanascaddan	337	Kilmacrenan	Kilmacrenan	Letterkenny
Bellina	160	Kilmacrenan	Tullaghobegly	Dunfanaghy
Bellville (or Gartan)	174	Kilmacrenan	Gartan	Letterkenny
Beltany	295	Raphoe	Raphoe	Strabane
Beltany Lower	394	Kilmacrenan	Tullaghobegly	Dunfanaghy
Beltany Mountain	1,067	Kilmacrenan	Tullaghobegly	Dunfanaghy
Beltany Upper	201	Kilmacrenan	Tullaghobegly	Dunfanaghy
Bicketstown (or Tirnagushoge)	140	Raphoe	Donaghmore	Strabane
Big Isle	175	Raphoe	Raymoghy	Letterkenny
Bigpark	106	Tirhugh	Drumhome	Donegal
Billary	47	Tirhugh	Templecarn	Donegal
Bin	25	Kilmacrenan	Killygarvan	Millford
Bindoo	154	Raphoe	Kilteevoge	Stranorlar
Bingorms	1,687	Kilmacrenan	Gartan	Dunfanaghy
Binmore	285	Raphoe	Kilteevoge	Stranorlar
Binnion	513	Inishowen East	Clonmany	Inishowen
Binnion	170	Raphoe	Taughboyne	Strabane
Binroe	189	Banagh	Killaghtee	Glenties
Binroe	185	Banagh	Killybegs Upper	Glenties
Birchhill	207	Tirhugh	Donegal	Donegal
Bircog	94	Tirhugh	Templecarn	Donegal
Birdstown	126	Raphoe	Clonleigh	Strabane
Birdstown Demesne	266	Inishowen West	Fahan Upper	Londonderry
Birra	168	Tirhugh	Drumhome	Ballyshannon
Bishop's Island	1	Kilmacrenan	Clondahorky	Dunfanaghy
Blabreenagh	358	Tirhugh	Drumhome	Donegal
Blackland	32	Kilmacrenan	Tullyfern	Millford
Blackrepentance	95	Raphoe	Raphoe	Strabane
Blackrock	9	Raphoe	Clonleigh	Strabane
Black's Glen	167	Kilmacrenan	Tullyfern	Millford
Blairstown	289	Raphoe	Donaghmore	Stranorlar
Blanket Nook (Intake)	630	Raphoe	Allsaints	Londonderry
Blanket Nook (Intake)	246	Inishowen West	Burt	Londonderry
Bo Island	4	Kilmacrenan	Tullaghobegly	Dunfanaghy
Boat Island	2	Tirhugh	Templecarn	Donegal
Boeeshil	937	Tirhugh	Templecarn	Donegal
Bogagh	214	Raphoe	Raphoe	Strabane
Bogagh Glebe	596	Banagh	Kilcar	Glenties
Bogay	91	Kilmacrenan	Aghanunshin	Letterkenny
Bogay Glebe	156	Raphoe	Allsaints	Londonderry
Bogside	35	Banagh	Killaghtee	Donegal
Bohanboy	394	Raphoe	Donaghmore	Stranorlar
Boheolan	170	Kilmacrenan	Conwal	Letterkenny
Bohirril	233	Kilmacrenan	Conwal	Letterkenny
Bohirril Park	95	Kilmacrenan	Conwal	Letterkenny
Bohullion (or Glack)	296	Inishowen West	Inch	Londonderry
Bohullion Lower	629	Inishowen West	Burt	Londonderry
Bohullion Upper	661	Inishowen West	Burt	Londonderry
Bomany	210	Raphoe	Conwal	Letterkenny
Bonnyglen	98	Banagh	Inver	Donegal
Booragh	223	Kilmacrenan	Conwal	Millford
Boultypatrick	1,133	Raphoe	Kilteevoge	Stranorlar
Boyagh	243	Raphoe	Clonleigh	Strabane
Boyoughter	1,076	Boylagh	Lettermacaward	Glenties
Braade	349	Boylagh	Templecrone	Glenties
Braade	245	Raphoe	Clonleigh	Strabane
Braade Lower	878	Banagh	Glencolumbkille	Glenties
Braade Upper	728	Banagh	Glencolumbkille	Glenties
Bracky	288	Banagh	Inishkeel	Glenties
Braehead	131	Raphoe	Raphoe	Strabane
Bready	322	Raphoe	Taughboyne	Londonderry
Breaghy	303	Kilmacrenan	Clondahorky	Dunfanaghy
Breaghy	403	Kilmacrenan	Conwal	Millford
Breaghy	65	Kilmacrenan	Tullyfern	Millford
Breaghy	160	Raphoe	Donaghmore	Strabane
Bredagh Glen	873	Inishowen East	Moville Lower	Inishowen
Bree	1,151	Inishowen East	Clonca	Inishowen
Breen	114	Raphoe	Convoy	Stranorlar
Breenagh	886	Kilmacrenan	Conwal	Letterkenny
Brenter	224	Banagh	Inver	Donegal
Bridge End (or Drummonaghan)	229	Kilmacrenan	Tullyfern	Millford
Brinlack	1,292	Kilmacrenan	Tullaghobegly	Dunfanaghy
Broadlea	172	Raphoe	Raphoe	Strabane
Broadpath	185	Raphoe	Convoy	Stranorlar
Brockagh	870	Kilmacrenan	Clondahorky	Dunfanaghy
Brockagh	1,575	Boylagh	Templecrone	Glenties
Brockagh	198	Raphoe	Taughboyne	Strabane
Brockagh	825	Raphoe	Kilteevoge	Stranorlar
Brownhall	77	Raphoe	Conwal	Letterkenny
Brownhall Demesne	311	Tirhugh	Drumhome	Ballyshannon
Brownknowe	104	Kilmacrenan	Tullyfern	Millford
Bruckless	219	Banagh	Killaghtee	Donegal
Bunawack	375	Boylagh	Templecrone	Glenties
Bunbeg	65	Kilmacrenan	Tullaghobegly	Dunfanaghy
Bunbeg	65	Kilmacrenan	Tullaghobegly	Dunfanaghy
**Buncrana**	Town	Inishowen West	Fahan Lower	Inishowen
Buncronan	126	Banagh	Inver	Donegal
Buncroobog	250	Boylagh	Inishkeel	Glenties
**Bundoran**	Town	Tirhugh	Inishmacsaint	Ballyshannon
Bungosteen	78	Banagh	Killybegs Upper	Glenties
Bunnagee	140	Raphoe	Leck	Letterkenny
Bunnamayne	883	Inishowen West	Burt	Londonderry
Bunnaton	587	Kilmacrenan	Clondavaddog	Millford
Bunnatreesruhan	1,978	Kilmacrenan	Gartan	Dunfanaghy
Burns Mountain	255	Banagh	Killymard	Donegal
Burnside	161	Raphoe	Raphoe	Strabane
Burnthaw	108	Raphoe	Taughboyne	Strabane
Burt Level (Intake)	1,430	Inishowen West	Burt	Londonderry
Burtonport	32	Boylagh	Templecrone	Glenties
Cabadooey (or Altashane)	1,591	Inishowen East	Donagh	Inishowen
Cabra Brook	270	Kilmacrenan	Conwal	Letterkenny
Cabra Glebe	236	Kilmacrenan	Conwal	Letterkenny
Cabry	927	Inishowen East	Moville Upper	Inishowen
Calf Island	5	Boylagh	Templecrone	Glenties
Calhame	396	Banagh	Killaghtee	Donegal
Calhame	118	Kilmacrenan	Tullaghobegly	Dunfanaghy
Calhame	125	Raphoe	Leck	Letterkenny
Calhame	90	Raphoe	Clonleigh	Strabane
Calhame	229	Raphoe	Urney	Strabane
Calhame	296	Raphoe	Donaghmore	Stranorlar
Calhame (or Fallard)	269	Kilmacrenan	Conwal	Letterkenny
Calhame (or Montgomery's Fort)	146	Raphoe	Convoy	Stranorlar
Callan	396	Raphoe	Convoy	Stranorlar
Callanacor	86	Raphoe	Convoy	Stranorlar
Camblestown	48	Kilmacrenan	Aghanunshin	Letterkenny
Camlin	166	Tirhugh	Kilbarron	Ballyshannon
Camp	55	Tirhugh	Kilbarron	Ballyshannon
Camus	35	Raphoe	Clonleigh	Strabane
Cappagh	343	Banagh	Glencolumbkille	Glenties
Cappry	744	Raphoe	Stranorlar	Stranorlar
Cappry (Graham)	25	Raphoe	Stranorlar	Stranorlar
Cark	2,684	Raphoe	Convoy	Stranorlar
Carlan Lower	257	Kilmacrenan	Clondavaddog	Millford
Carlan Upper	389	Kilmacrenan	Clondavaddog	Millford
Carmoney	598	Kilmacrenan	Kilmacrenan	Millford
Carn	791	Tirhugh	Templecarn	Donegal
Carn	904	Raphoe	Donaghmore	Stranorlar
Carn Beg Glebe	58	Banagh	Killaghtee	Glenties
Carn High	471	Kilmacrenan	Tullyfern	Millford
Carn Low	222	Kilmacrenan	Tullyfern	Millford
Carn More Glebe	140	Banagh	Killaghtee	Glenties
Carnafeagh	103	Kilmacrenan	Killygarvan	Millford
Carnagarve	743	Inishowen East	Moville Lower	Inishowen
Carnaghan	279	Inishowen West	Inch	Londonderry
Carnagore	137	Kilmacrenan	Mevagh	Millford
Carnamuggagh Lower	393	Kilmacrenan	Conwal	Letterkenny
Carnamuggagh Upper	210	Kilmacrenan	Conwal	Letterkenny
Carnamoyle	2,927	Inishowen West	Muff	Londonderry
Carnashannagh	270	Inishowen West	Fahan Upper	Londonderry
Carnatreantagh	446	Kilmacrenan	Conwal	Letterkenny
Carnbeagh North	89	Tirhugh	Donegal	Donegal
Carnbeagh South	60	Tirhugh	Donegal	Donegal
Carnboy	236	Boylagh	Templecrone	Glenties
Carndoagh	607	Inishowen East	Donagh	Inishowen
**Carndonagh**	Town	Inishowen East	Donagh	Inishowen
Carngarrow	313	Kilmacrenan	Clondavaddog	Millford
Carnhill	85	Kilmacrenan	Aughnish	Millford
Carnisk	179	Kilmacrenan	Conwal	Millford
Carnisk	54	Kilmacrenan	Tullyfern	Millford
Carnowen	1,672	Raphoe	Donaghmore	Strabane
Carnshannagh	296	Raphoe	Taughboyne	Strabane
Carntressy	502	Tirhugh	Templecarn	Donegal
Carntullagh	217	Banagh	Killybegs Upper	Glenties
Carradoan	90	Kilmacrenan	Killygarvan	Millford
Carraduffy	250	Banagh	Inver	Donegal
Carrakeel	78	Banagh	Inver	Donegal
Carraleena	16	Kilmacrenan	Killygarvan	Millford
Carran, Upper & Lower	309	Kilmacrenan	Clondavaddog	Millford
Carranadore	136	Raphoe	Donaghmore	Strabane
Carrick	1,206	Kilmacrenan	Tullaghobegly	Dunfanaghy
Carrick	642	Kilmacrenan	Conwal	Letterkenny
Carrick	635	Kilmacrenan	Mevagh	Millford
Carrick	397	Raphoe	Donaghmore	Stranorlar
Carrick East	121	Tirhugh	Drumhome	Donegal
Carrick Lower	607	Banagh	Glencolumbkille	Glenties
Carrick Upper	807	Banagh	Glencolumbkille	Glenties
Carrick Upper/Lower Barr	1,142	Tirhugh	Drumhome	Donegal
Carrick West	142	Tirhugh	Drumhome	Donegal
Carrickabraghy	441	Inishowen East	Clonmany	Inishowen
Carrickadawson	383	Raphoe	Taughboyne	Strabane
Carrickafodan	777	Inishowen East	Donagh	Inishowen
Carrickalangan	1,085	Raphoe	Conwal	Stranorlar
Carrickanee	371	Inishowen West	Inch	Londonderry
**Carrickart**	Town	Kilmacrenan	Mevagh	Millford
Carrickart	870	Kilmacrenan	Mevagh	Millford
Carrickataggart	518	Banagh	Killybegs Upper	Glenties
Carrickatimpan	2,356	Kilmacrenan	Gartan	Letterkenny
Carrickatlieve Glebe	1,824	Banagh	Killybegs Lower	Glenties
Carrickballydooey	119	Raphoe	Raymoghy	Letterkenny
Carrickballydooey Glebe	50	Raphoe	Raymoghy	Letterkenny
Carrickboy	225	Tirhugh	Inishmacsaint	Ballyshannon
Carrickbrack	516	Raphoe	Convoy	Stranorlar
Carrickbrack	72	Raphoe	Raphoe	Stranorlar
Carrickbreeny	267	Tirhugh	Drumhome	Donegal
Carrickfin	213	Boylagh	Templecrone	Glenties
Carrickmagrath	888	Raphoe	Donaghmore	Stranorlar
Carrickmahon	472	Raphoe	Kilteevoge	Stranorlar
Carrickmaquigley	832	Inishowen East	Moville Upper	Inishowen
Carrickmore	471	Raphoe	Taughboyne	Strabane
Carricknagore	127	Banagh	Killybegs Upper	Glenties
Carricknahorna	2,337	Tirhugh	Kilbarron	Ballyshannon
Carricknamanna	689	Raphoe	Donaghmore	Stranorlar
Carricknamart	440	Raphoe	Raymoghy	Letterkenny
Carricknamoghil	533	Banagh	Killybegs Upper	Glenties
Carricknashane	134	Raphoe	Donaghmore	Stranorlar
Carricknashee	3	Boylagh	Inishkeel	Glenties
Carricknaslate	90	Raphoe	Clonleigh	Strabane
Carrickrory	614	Tirhugh	Templecarn	Donegal
Carrickshandrum	185	Raphoe	Donaghmore	Stranorlar
Carrickybressil	148	Kilmacrenan	Kilmacrenan	Millford
Carrickyscanlan	161	Kilmacrenan	Conwal	Letterkenny
Carriff Island	7	Boylagh	Templecrone	Glenties
**Carrigans**	Town	Raphoe	Killea	Londonderry
Carrigans	129	Raphoe	Killea	Londonderry
Carroghill	305	Inishowen West	Mintiaghs or Barr of Inch	Inishowen
Carrontlieve	118	Inishowen West	Fahan Upper	Londonderry
Carrowbeg	464	Inishowen East	Moville Lower	Inishowen
Carrowblagh	2,414	Inishowen East	Donagh	Inishowen
Carrowblagh	745	Inishowen East	Moville Lower	Inishowen
Carrowblagh (or Leckemy)	935	Inishowen East	Moville Lower	Inishowen
Carrowcanon	459	Kilmacrenan	Raymunterdoney	Dunfanaghy
Carrowcashel	288	Kilmacrenan	Aughnish	Millford
Carrowen	435	Inishowen West	Burt	Londonderry
Carrowhugh	633	Inishowen East	Moville Lower	Inishowen
Carrowkeel	110	Inishowen East	Moville Upper	Inishowen
Carrowkeel	177	Kilmacrenan	Tullyfern	Millford
Carrowkeel Glebe	307	Kilmacrenan	Clondavaddog	Millford
Carrowmenagh	713	Inishowen East	Moville Lower	Inishowen
Carrowmore	839	Inishowen East	Clonca	Inishowen
Carrowmore	798	Inishowen East	Culdaff	Inishowen
Carrowmore (or Glentogher)	5,784	Inishowen East	Donagh	Inishowen
Carrowmullin	301	Inishowen West	Fahan Upper	Londonderry
Carrownaff	225	Inishowen East	Moville Upper	Inishowen
Carrownaganonagh	1,015	Kilmacrenan	Kilmacrenan	Millford
Carrownamaddy	2,198	Kilmacrenan	Clondahorky	Dunfanaghy
Carrownamaddy	386	Inishowen West	Burt	Londonderry
Carrownasaul	279	Kilmacrenan	Kilmacrenan	Millford
Carrowreagh	1,803	Inishowen East	Donagh	Inishowen
Carrowreagh	1,242	Inishowen West	Burt	Londonderry
Carrowreagh	465	Kilmacrenan	Clondavaddog	Millford
Carrowreagh (or Craignacally)	497	Inishowen East	Clonmany	Inishowen
Carrowtrasna	808	Inishowen East	Moville Lower	Inishowen
Carrowtrasna	1,003	Kilmacrenan	Gartan	Letterkenny
Carryblagh	218	Kilmacrenan	Clondavaddog	Millford
Carrygally	145	Raphoe	Leck	Letterkenny
Carrygalt	112	Kilmacrenan	Aughnish	Millford
Carthage	1,497	Inishowen East	Culdaff	Inishowen
Casey Glebe	124	Kilmacrenan	Raymunterdoney	Dunfanaghy
Cashel	687	Tirhugh	Kilbarron	Ballyshannon
Cashel	1,010	Kilmacrenan	Kilmacrenan	Dunfanaghy
Cashel	336	Kilmacrenan	Tullaghobegly	Dunfanaghy
Cashel	1,230	Banagh	Glencolumbkille	Glenties
Cashel	760	Banagh	Inishkeel	Glenties
Cashel	762	Inishowen East	Culdaff	Inishowen
Cashel	1,449	Inishowen East	Donagh	Inishowen
Cashel	183	Raphoe	Kilteevoge	Stranorlar
Cashel Glebe	130	Kilmacrenan	Clondavaddog	Millford
Cashelard	2,740	Tirhugh	Kilbarron	Ballyshannon
Cashelcarn	247	Banagh	Kilcar	Glenties
Cashelcummin	44	Banagh	Killybegs Upper	Glenties
Casheleenan	931	Kilmacrenan	Kilmacrenan	Millford
Cashelenny	660	Tirhugh	Templecarn	Donegal
Cashelfean	279	Banagh	Killaghtee	Donegal
Cashelgay	274	Kilmacrenan	Kilmacrenan	Letterkenny
Cashelgolan	463	Boylagh	Inishkeel	Glenties
Cashelin	207	Raphoe	Donaghmore	Strabane
Cashellackan	82	Tirhugh	Kilbarron	Ballyshannon
Cashelmore	280	Kilmacrenan	Clondahorky	Dunfanaghy
Cashelnagor	1,352	Kilmacrenan	Tullaghobegly	Dunfanaghy
Cashelnavean	1,840	Raphoe	Stranorlar	Stranorlar
Cashelodogherty	106	Banagh	Killybegs Lower	Glenties
Casheloogary	920	Banagh	Inver	Donegal
Cashelpreaghan	232	Kilmacrenan	Clondavaddog	Millford
Cashelreagh	214	Kilmacrenan	Conwal	Letterkenny
Cashelreagh Glebe	230	Banagh	Killaghtee	Glenties
Cashelshanaghan	845	Kilmacrenan	Aughnish	Letterkenny
Casheltown	431	Banagh	Killaghtee	Donegal
Casheltown	253	Kilmacrenan	Gartan	Letterkenny
Casheltown Mountain	391	Kilmacrenan	Gartan	Letterkenny
Castlebane	59	Kilmacrenan	Clondahorky	Dunfanaghy
Castlebane	73	Kilmacrenan	Aghanunshin	Letterkenny
Castlebane	122	Raphoe	Stranorlar	Stranorlar
Castleblaugh.	264	Raphoe	Raymoghy	Londonderry
Castlecooly	298	Inishowen West	Burt	Londonderry
Castledoe	221	Kilmacrenan	Clondahorky	Dunfanaghy
Castledowey	502	Raphoe	Raymoghy	Strabane
Castledowey	43	Raphoe	Taughboyne	Strabane
**Castlefinn**	Town	Raphoe	Donaghmore	Strabane
Castlefinn	152	Raphoe	Donaghmore	Strabane
Castleforward Demesne	321	Raphoe	Allsaints	Londonderry
Castlequarter	110	Inishowen West	Fahan Upper	Londonderry
Castlequarter	295	Inishowen West	Inch	Londonderry
Castlethird	213	Raphoe	Taughboyne	Londonderry
Castletorrison	342	Raphoe	Convoy	Stranorlar
Castletown	381	Raphoe	Taughboyne	Strabane
Castlewray	144	Kilmacrenan	Aghanunshin	Letterkenny
Castruse	433	Raphoe	Allsaints	Londonderry
Catherine's Isle	2	Kilmacrenan	Clondahorky	Dunfanaghy
Cavan	85	Tirhugh	Kilbarron	Ballyshannon
Cavan	120	Banagh	Killaghtee	Donegal
Cavan	126	Raphoe	Clonleigh	Strabane
Cavan Lower	434	Raphoe	Donaghmore	Stranorlar
Cavan Upper	578	Raphoe	Donaghmore	Stranorlar
Cavanacaw	85	Raphoe	Taughboyne	Strabane
Cavanacor	85	Raphoe	Clonleigh	Strabane
Cavanaweery	129	Raphoe	Urney	Strabane
Cavangarden	299	Tirhugh	Kilbarron	Ballyshannon
Cherrymount	167	Tirhugh	Kilbarron	Ballyshannon
Church Hill	269	Kilmacrenan	Gartan	Letterkenny
Churchland Quarters (or Carrowtemple, Moneyshandoney, & Carrick)	5,187	Inishowen East	Donagh	Inishowen
Churchtown	525	Kilmacrenan	Gartan	Letterkenny
Churchtown	216	Raphoe	Clonleigh	Strabane
Claggan	844	Kilmacrenan	Clondahorky	Dunfanaghy
Claggan	112	Inishowen East	Moville Upper	Inishowen
Claggan	112	Kilmacrenan	Clondavaddog	Millford
Claggan	226	Kilmacrenan	Tullyfern	Millford
Claggan Mountain	237	Kilmacrenan	Gartan	Letterkenny
Claggan Mountain North	259	Kilmacrenan	Gartan	Dunfanaghy
Claggan Mountain South	230	Kilmacrenan	Gartan	Letterkenny
Claggan North	136	Kilmacrenan	Gartan	Letterkenny
Claggan South	133	Kilmacrenan	Gartan	Letterkenny
Clanboorhin	254	Banagh	Killymard	Donegal
Claragh	253	Kilmacrenan	Tullyfern	Millford
Clarcam	245	Tirhugh	Donegal	Donegal
Clarcarricknagun	123	Tirhugh	Donegal	Donegal
Clardrumbarren	81	Tirhugh	Donegal	Donegal
Clardrumnagahan	39	Tirhugh	Donegal	Donegal
Clare	957	Inishowen East	Moville Upper	Inishowen
Clarlougheask	204	Tirhugh	Donegal	Donegal
Clashygowan	568	Raphoe	Taughboyne	Strabane
Cleenagh	373	Inishowen West	Fahan Lower	Inishowen
Cleenderry	272	Boylagh	Templecrone	Glenties
Cleengort	483	Boylagh	Inishkeel	Glenties
Clehagh	359	Inishowen East	Clonmany	Inishowen
Clogfin	227	Raphoe	Urney	Strabane
Cloghan	115	Banagh	Glencolumbkille	Glenties
Cloghan Beg	256	Raphoe	Kilteevoge	Stranorlar
Cloghan More	472	Raphoe	Kilteevoge	Stranorlar
Cloghard	89	Raphoe	Donaghmore	Strabane
Cloghbolie	156	Tirhugh	Kilbarron	Ballyshannon
Cloghbolie	1,634	Boylagh	Templecrone	Glenties
Cloghboy	489	Banagh	Inishkeel	Glenties
Cloghcor	81	Boylagh	Templecrone	Glenties
Clogher	1,281	Tirhugh	Donegal	Donegal
Clogher East	1,444	Boylagh	Inishkeel	Glenties
Clogher West	241	Boylagh	Inishkeel	Glenties
Clogherachullion	1,508	Boylagh	Inishkeel	Glenties
Clogheravaddy	251	Banagh	Inver	Donegal
Cloghercor	2,914	Boylagh	Inishkeel	Glenties
Clogherdillure	200	Boylagh	Templecrone	Glenties
Cloghernagh	272	Kilmacrenan	Clondahorky	Dunfanaghy
Cloghernagore	1,619	Boylagh	Inishkeel	Glenties
Cloghervaddy	1,803	Raphoe	Kilteevoge	Stranorlar
Cloghfin	364	Raphoe	Taughboyne	Londonderry
Cloghfin	253	Kilmacrenan	Clondavaddog	Millford
Cloghfin	162	Raphoe	Clonleigh	Strabane
Cloghglass	129	Boylagh	Templecrone	Glenties
Cloghgore	64	Raphoe	Convoy	Stranorlar
Cloghore	480	Tirhugh	Kilbarron	Ballyshannon
Cloghroe	276	Kilmacrenan	Kilmacrenan	Letterkenny
Cloghroe	524	Raphoe	Convoy	Stranorlar
Clonbara	312	Kilmacrenan	Tullaghobegly	Dunfanaghy
Clonbeg Glebe	103	Kilmacrenan	Clondahorky	Dunfanaghy
Clonblosk&Ballymagan Upr & Lwr	481	Inishowen West	Fahan Lower	Inishowen
Clonca	782	Inishowen East	Clonca	Inishowen
Cloncarney	832	Kilmacrenan	Conwal	Letterkenny
Clonclayagh	255	Raphoe	Kilteevoge	Stranorlar
Clonconwal	470	Banagh	Killybegs Lower	Glenties
Clondallan	265	Kilmacrenan	Killygarvan	Millford
Clondavaddog	413	Kilmacrenan	Gartan	Letterkenny
Clonglash and Bauville Keeloges	727	Inishowen West	Fahan Lower	Inishowen
Clonkilly Beg	249	Kilmacrenan	Kilmacrenan	Millford
Clonkilly More	237	Kilmacrenan	Kilmacrenan	Millford
Clonmass	337	Kilmacrenan	Clondahorky	Dunfanaghy
Clonmass Isle	21	Kilmacrenan	Clondahorky	Dunfanaghy
Clonmore	237	Kilmacrenan	Clondahorky	Dunfanaghy
Clontallagh	230	Kilmacrenan	Mevagh	Millford
Clontyseer	198	Tirhugh	Kilbarron	Ballyshannon
Clonyreel	224	Raphoe	Donaghmore	Stranorlar
Cloon	285	Raphoe	Allsaints	Londonderry
Clooney	283	Boylagh	Inishkeel	Glenties
Clooney	361	Kilmacrenan	Tullyfern	Millford
Clooney & Gortnamona	144	Kilmacrenan	Clondavaddog	Millford
Clooney More	204	Kilmacrenan	Tullyfern	Millford
Cloontagh	1,930	Inishowen East	Clonmany	Inishowen
Cloverhill (or Drumbeg)	126	Banagh	Inver	Donegal
Coaghmill	46	Raphoe	Leck	Letterkenny
Coguish	1,087	Banagh	Kilcar	Glenties
Colehill	190	Raphoe	Allsaints	Londonderry
Commeen	3,743	Boylagh	Lettermacaward	Glenties
Commeen	235	Raphoe	Kilteevoge	Stranorlar
Common	155	Banagh	Inishkeel	Glenties
Common	444	Raphoe	Raphoe	Strabane
Common Mountain	162	Banagh	Inishkeel	Glenties
Conaghrud	306	Kilmacrenan	Tullyfern	Millford
Coney Island	13	Raphoe	Allsaints	Londonderry
Coneyburrow	130	Raphoe	Clonleigh	Strabane
Connaghkinnagoe	844	Inishowen West	Fahan Lower	Inishowen
Contycro	335	Banagh	Glencolumbkille	Glenties
**Convoy**	Town	Raphoe	Convoy	Stranorlar
Convoy Demesne	312	Raphoe	Convoy	Stranorlar
Convoy Townparks	352	Raphoe	Convoy	Stranorlar
Conwal	180	Kilmacrenan	Conwal	Letterkenny
Cool Beg	286	Tirhugh	Kilbarron	Ballyshannon
Cool Lower	624	Kilmacrenan	Kilmacrenan	Millford
Cool More	115	Tirhugh	Kilbarron	Ballyshannon
Cool Upper	530	Kilmacrenan	Kilmacrenan	Millford
Cooladawson	130	Raphoe	Donaghmore	Stranorlar
Cooladerry	129	Kilmacrenan	Clondavaddog	Millford
Cooladerry	255	Raphoe	Raphoe	Strabane
Cooladerry Mountain	186	Kilmacrenan	Clondavaddog	Millford
Coolaghy	198	Raphoe	Raphoe	Strabane
Coolaghy Glebe	129	Raphoe	Raphoe	Strabane
Coolatee	132	Raphoe	Clonleigh	Strabane
Coolback	132	Kilmacrenan	Clondavaddog	Millford
Coolboy Big	350	Kilmacrenan	Conwal	Letterkenny
Coolboy Little	238	Kilmacrenan	Conwal	Letterkenny
Coolcholly	819	Tirhugh	Kilbarron	Ballyshannon
Coolshangan	142	Banagh	Inver	Donegal
Coolvoy	754	Boylagh	Inishkeel	Glenties
Cooly	866	Inishowen East	Moville Upper	Inishowen
Coolyslin	158	Raphoe	Urney	Strabane
Company	170	Tirhugh	Drumhome	Donegal
Cor	85	Boylagh	Lettermacaward	Glenties
Corcam	60	Raphoe	Donaghmore	Stranorlar
Corcashy	109	Raphoe	Convoy	Stranorlar
Corcreggan	201	Kilmacrenan	Clondahorky	Dunfanaghy
Corcullion	67	Raphoe	Donaghmore	Strabane
Corderry	296	Kilmacrenan	Gartan	Letterkenny
Corgannive Glebe	189	Kilmacrenan	Clondahorky	Dunfanaghy
Corgary	341	Raphoe	Donaghmore	Stranorlar
Corkan Isle	101	Raphoe	Clonleigh	Strabane
Corker Beg	201	Banagh	Killaghtee	Donegal
Corker More	759	Banagh	Killaghtee	Donegal
Corkey	342	Raphoe	Raymoghy	Letterkenny
Corlacky	587	Raphoe	Kilteevoge	Stranorlar
Corlea	1,108	Tirhugh	Kilbarron	Ballyshannon
Corlea	884	Tirhugh	Templecarn	Donegal
Corlea	477	Raphoe	Donaghmore	Stranorlar
Cormakilly	192	Raphoe	Urney	Strabane
Cormullin / Cormullion	519	Tirhugh	Drumhome	Donegal
Cornabrogue	131	Raphoe	Donaghmore	Stranorlar
Cornacahan	135	Banagh	Killybegs Upper	Glenties
Cornagill	159	Kilmacrenan	Aghanunshin	Letterkenny
Cornagillagh	289	Raphoe	Convoy	Stranorlar
Cornagrillagh	515	Boylagh	Inishkeel	Glenties
Cornagullion	306	Kilmacrenan	Gartan	Letterkenny
Cornaveagh	155	Tirhugh	Donegal	Donegal
Corncamble	324	Raphoe	Allsaints	Londonderry
Corporation	358	Banagh	Killybegs Upper	Glenties
Corracramph	168	Tirhugh	Donegal	Donegal
Corradooey	375	Raphoe	Convoy	Stranorlar
Corradooey	888	Raphoe	Donaghmore	Stranorlar
Corraffrin	781	Raphoe	Donaghmore	Stranorlar
Corragh Island	1	Boylagh	Templecrone	Glenties
Corraine	1,411	Raphoe	Kilteevoge	Stranorlar
Corranagh	596	Raphoe	Leck	Letterkenny
Corraness Glebe	383	Banagh	Killybegs Lower	Glenties
Corravaddy	413	Raphoe	Conwal	Letterkenny
Corry	334	Kilmacrenan	Clondavaddog	Millford
Corveen	231	Tirhugh	Donegal	Donegal
Corveen	1,471	Kilmacrenan	Tullaghobegly	Dunfanaghy
Cottage	67	Raphoe	Raymoghy	Londonderry
Cottian	214	Kilmacrenan	Kilmacrenan	Millford
Cottown	248	Raphoe	Raphoe	Strabane
Court	412	Kilmacrenan	Kilmacrenan	Millford
Cowpark	88	Tirhugh	Kilbarron	Ballyshannon
Coxtown	109	Tirhugh	Drumhome	Donegal
Craghy	1,409	Boylagh	Templecrone	Glenties
Craghy	921	Kilmacrenan	Conwal	Letterkenny
Craig	99	Kilmacrenan	Clondahorky	Dunfanaghy
Craig	483	Inishowen West	Muff	Londonderry
Craigdoo	187	Raphoe	Convoy	Stranorlar
Craigmaddyroe Far	139	Kilmacrenan	Killygarvan	Millford
Craigmaddyroe Near	126	Kilmacrenan	Killygarvan	Millford
Craignacally (or Carrowreagh)	497	Inishowen East	Clonmany	Inishowen
Craigroe	112	Tirhugh	Donegal	Donegal
Craigs	168	Raphoe	Raphoe	Strabane
Craigs (or Tommyscroft)	143	Raphoe	Convoy	Stranorlar
Craigtown	145	Kilmacrenan	Tullaghobegly	Dunfanaghy
Craigtown	219	Inishowen West	Fahan Upper	Londonderry
Cranberry Island	1	Kilmacrenan	Kilmacrenan	Millford
Cranford	725	Kilmacrenan	Kilmacrenan	Millford
Crannogeboy	393	Banagh	Inishkeel	Glenties
Cranny Lower	280	Banagh	Inver	Donegal
Cranny Upper	154	Banagh	Inver	Donegal
Cratlagh	1,041	Kilmacrenan	Tullyfern	Millford
Creaghadoos	562	Raphoe	Taughboyne	Strabane
Creatland	146	Raphoe	Taughboyne	Strabane
Creehennan	828	Inishowen East	Moville Upper	Inishowen
Creenary	548	Kilmacrenan	Clondahorky	Dunfanaghy
Creenasmear	872	Kilmacrenan	Clondahorky	Dunfanaghy
Creenveen	641	Banagh	Glencolumbkille	Glenties
**Creeslough**	Town	Kilmacrenan	Clondahorky	Dunfanaghy
Creeslough	427	Kilmacrenan	Clondahorky	Dunfanaghy
Creevagh	205	Kilmacrenan	Mevagh	Millford
Creeve	304	Raphoe	Allsaints	Londonderry
Creeve (Smith)	232	Raphoe	Leck	Letterkenny
Creeve Glebe	295	Raphoe	Leck	Letterkenny
Creeveoughter	846	Kilmacrenan	Killygarvan	Millford
Creevins	199	Banagh	Inver	Donegal
Creevy	815	Tirhugh	Kilbarron	Ballyshannon
Creggan	256	Raphoe	Raphoe	Strabane
Creggan	1,189	Raphoe	Stranorlar	Stranorlar
Crevary Lower	157	Kilmacrenan	Killygarvan	Millford
Crevary Upper	184	Kilmacrenan	Killygarvan	Millford
Crilly	681	Tirhugh	Templecarn	Donegal
Crislaghkeel	542	Inishowen West	Fahan Upper	Londonderry
Crislaghmore	515	Inishowen West	Fahan Upper	Londonderry
Croagh	1,238	Banagh	Killaghtee	Donegal
Croagh	357	Tirhugh	Templecarn	Donegal
Croaghan	380	Kilmacrenan	Aughnish	Millford
Croaghan	314	Kilmacrenan	Clondavaddog	Millford
Croaghan	106	Raphoe	Clonleigh	Strabane
Croaghan Island	17	Kilmacrenan	Clondavaddog	Millford
Croaghanarget	1,368	Banagh	Killymard	Donegal
Croaghbeg	208	Banagh	Kilcar	Glenties
Croaghbrack	1,725	Tirhugh	Templecarn	Donegal
Croaghbreesy	523	Tirhugh	Kilbarron	Ballyshannon
Croaghcullion	454	Banagh	Glencolumbkille	Glenties
Croagheen (or Loughbarra)	2,020	Kilmacrenan	Gartan	Letterkenny
Croaghlin	281	Banagh	Glencolumbkille	Glenties
Croaghlin	152	Banagh	Killybegs Upper	Glenties
Croaghnacree	262	Boylagh	Templecrone	Glenties
Croaghnakern	942	Tirhugh	Drumhome	Donegal
Croaghnameal	888	Tirhugh	Drumhome	Donegal
Croaghnashallog	1,250	Boylagh	Templecrone	Glenties
Croaghonagh	3,860	Raphoe	Donaghmore	Stranorlar
Croaghross	312	Kilmacrenan	Clondavaddog	Millford
Croaghubbrid	556	Boylagh	Inishkeel	Glenties
Croankeeran	681	Banagh	Killymard	Donegal
Crocam	727	Boylagh	Inishkeel	Glenties
Crockacapple	125	Tirhugh	Kilbarron	Ballyshannon
Crockahany (or Rossnowlagh Upper)	389	Tirhugh	Drumhome	Ballyshannon
Crockahenny	857	Inishowen East	Moville Upper	Inishowen
Crockastoller	1,892	Kilmacrenan	Gartan	Letterkenny
Crockglass	358	Inishowen East	Moville Upper	Inishowen
Crocknacunny	1,726	Tirhugh	Templecarn	Donegal
Crocknafeola	167	Banagh	Killybegs Upper	Glenties
Crocknagapple	818	Banagh	Killybegs Lower	Glenties
Crocknageeragh	248	Boylagh	Templecrone	Glenties
Crocknamurleog	190	Kilmacrenan	Mevagh	Millford
Crockraw	147	Kilmacrenan	Gartan	Letterkenny
Crohy	1,085	Boylagh	Templecrone	Glenties
Crohyboyle	1,607	Boylagh	Templecrone	Glenties
Crolack	1,155	Raphoe	Kilteevoge	Stranorlar
Crolly	2,471	Kilmacrenan	Tullaghobegly	Dunfanaghy
Cronacarckfree	770	Banagh	Inver	Donegal
Cronadon	925	Raphoe	Kilteevoge	Stranorlar
Cronaguiggy	794	Kilmacrenan	Tullaghobegly	Dunfanaghy
Cronakerny	1,572	Raphoe	Kilteevoge	Stranorlar
Cronalaghy	1,221	Raphoe	Donaghmore	Stranorlar
Cronamuck	614	Raphoe	Kilteevoge	Stranorlar
Cronaslieve	530	Banagh	Inver	Donegal
Cronkeeran	320	Banagh	Killybegs Lower	Glenties
Cross	121	Inishowen East	Moville Upper	Inishowen
Cross	237	Raphoe	Taughboyne	Londonderry
Crossconnell	255	Inishowen East	Clonmany	Inishowen
Crossogs	164	Kilmacrenan	Conwal	Letterkenny
Croveenenanta	777	Boylagh	Inishkeel	Glenties
Crovehy	1,334	Boylagh	Templecrone	Glenties
Crowanrudda	1,040	Banagh	Kilcar	Glenties
Crowanrudda Beg	435	Banagh	Kilcar	Glenties
Crowbane	1,359	Banagh	Kilcar	Glenties
Crowdoo	1,112	Banagh	Kilcar	Glenties
Croweighter	1,236	Banagh	Kilcar	Glenties
Crowkeeragh	913	Banagh	Kilcar	Glenties
Crowlar	919	Banagh	Kilcar	Glenties
Crownasillagh	875	Banagh	Rossory	Enniskillen
Cruickaghmore	794	Boylagh	Templecrone	Glenties
Cruit Lower	432	Boylagh	Templecrone	Glenties
Cruit Upper	308	Boylagh	Templecrone	Glenties
Crumlin	256	Banagh	Inver	Donegal
Crumlin	197	Banagh	Inishkeel	Glenties
Cuilly	253	Tirhugh	Drumhome	Donegal
Culdaff	245	Inishowen East	Culdaff	Inishowen
Culdaff Glebe	158	Inishowen East	Culdaff	Inishowen
Culineen	300	Inishowen East	Moville Upper	Inishowen
Culliagh	421	Raphoe	Kilteevoge	Stranorlar
Cullion	872	Tirhugh	Templecarn	Donegal
Cullion	210	Banagh	Killybegs Upper	Glenties
Cullion	83	Raphoe	Leck	Letterkenny
Cullion Boy	1,650	Tirhugh	Donegal	Donegal
Culoort	987	Inishowen East	Clonca	Inishowen
Cummirk	942	Kilmacrenan	Conwal	Stranorlar
Cunlin	276	Banagh	Killybegs Upper	Glenties
Cunninghamstown (or Legnabraid)	10	Raphoe	Clonleigh	Strabane
Curragh	125	Raphoe	Leck	Letterkenny
Curraghafeaghan	196	Banagh	Killaghtee	Glenties
Curraghalane	152	Raphoe	Clonleigh	Strabane
Curraghavogy	274	Kilmacrenan	Gartan	Letterkenny
Curraghlea	310	Kilmacrenan	Conwal	Letterkenny
Curraghomongan	1,417	Raphoe	Stranorlar	Stranorlar
Curreen and Gannew	332	Banagh	Glencolumbkille	Glenties
Currin	360	Kilmacrenan	Kilmacrenan	Millford
Currynanerriagh	951	Boylagh	Inishkeel	Glenties
Cuskry Glebe	203	Banagh	Kilcar	Glenties
Cuttymanhil	97	Raphoe	Taughboyne	Strabane
Dalraghan Beg	546	Boylagh	Inishkeel	Glenties
Dalraghan More	850	Boylagh	Inishkeel	Glenties
Dargan	134	Kilmacrenan	Clondavaddog	Millford
Darney	402	Banagh	Killaghtee	Donegal
Dawros	468	Boylagh	Inishkeel	Glenties
Dawros Island	9	Boylagh	Inishkeel	Glenties
Deenystown	31	Kilmacrenan	Aghanunshin	Letterkenny
Deerpark	240	Raphoe	Raphoe	Strabane
Demesne	130	Raphoe	Donaghmore	Strabane
Derg Beg Island	2	Tirhugh	Templecarn	Donegal
Derg More Island	5	Tirhugh	Templecarn	Donegal
Dergroagh	253	Raphoe	Kilteevoge	Stranorlar
Derk Beg	486	Boylagh	Inishkeel	Glenties
Derk More	239	Boylagh	Inishkeel	Glenties
Dernacally	252	Raphoe	Taughboyne	Londonderry
Derries	733	Tirhugh	Drumhome	Ballyshannon
Derries	398	Boylagh	Killybegs Lower	Glenties
Derriseligh	1,546	Kilmacrenan	Kilmacrenan	Millford
Derrora	1,143	Kilmacrenan	Conwal	Letterkenny
Derryart	193	Kilmacrenan	Clondahorky	Dunfanaghy
Derrybeg	112	Kilmacrenan	Tullaghobegly	Dunfanaghy
Derrybeg	167	Kilmacrenan	Gartan	Letterkenny
Derrycassan	632	Kilmacrenan	Mevagh	Millford
Derryconnor	1,224	Kilmacrenan	Tullaghobegly	Dunfanaghy
Derrydruel Lower	580	Boylagh	Templecrone	Glenties
Derrydruel Upper	447	Boylagh	Templecrone	Glenties
Derryfad	645	Kilmacrenan	Clondahorky	Dunfanaghy
Derryharriff Glebe	467	Kilmacrenan	Raymunterdoney	Dunfanaghy
Derryhirk	101	Banagh	Inver	Donegal
Derrykillow	1,051	Tirhugh	Kilbarron	Ballyshannon
Derrylahan	2,309	Kilmacrenan	Gartan	Dunfanaghy
Derrylahan	640	Banagh	Kilcar	Glenties
Derryleconnell Far	1,227	Boylagh	Lettermacaward	Glenties
Derryleconnell Near	1,368	Boylagh	Lettermacaward	Glenties
Derryloaghan	841	Boylagh	Inishkeel	Glenties
Derrymore	139	Raphoe	Taughboyne	Londonderry
Derrynacarrow	718	Boylagh	Lettermacaward	Glenties
Derrynacarrow East (or Ballinaboy)	99	Boylagh	Lettermacaward	Glenties
Derrynagrial	1,437	Boylagh	Lettermacaward	Glenties
Derrynamansher	349	Boylagh	Templecrone	Glenties
Derrynanaspol	2,667	Boylagh	Lettermacaward	Glenties
Derryness	274	Boylagh	Inishkeel	Glenties
Derryness Island	6	Boylagh	Inishkeel	Glenties
Derryreel	786	Kilmacrenan	Clondahorky	Dunfanaghy
Derryreel	738	Kilmacrenan	Raymunterdoney	Dunfanaghy
Derryvane	929	Inishowen West	Muff	Londonderry
Devlin	2,203	Kilmacrenan	Gartan	Dunfanaghy
Devlin (or Barr of Ballyconnell)	1,129	Kilmacrenan	Raymunterdoney	Dunfanaghy
Devlinmore	617	Kilmacrenan	Mevagh	Millford
Devlinreagh	382	Kilmacrenan	Mevagh	Millford
Diffin	33	Raphoe	Raphoe	Strabane
Disert	1,190	Banagh	Inver	Donegal
Doagh	372	Kilmacrenan	Mevagh	Millford
Doagh Beg	564	Kilmacrenan	Clondavaddog	Millford
Doagh More	800	Kilmacrenan	Clondavaddog	Millford
**Doaghbeg**	Town	Kilmacrenan	Clondavaddog	Millford
Doaghcrabbin	198	Kilmacrenan	Clondavaddog	Millford
Donaghmore Glebe	221	Raphoe	Donaghmore	Strabane
**Donegal**	Town	Tirhugh	Donegal	Donegal
**Donegal**	Town	Banagh	Killymard	Donegal
Donegal	133	Tirhugh	Donegal	Donegal
Dooballagh	1,234	Raphoe	Leck	Letterkenny
Doobally	504	Tirhugh	Kilbarron	Ballyshannon
Doobin	2,166	Boylagh	Inishkeel	Glenties
Doocarrick	97	Kilmacrenan	Clondavaddog	Millford
Doocashel Glebe	273	Kilmacrenan	Clondahorky	Dunfanaghy
Doochill North	448	Banagh	Killybegs Lower	Glenties
Doochill South	152	Banagh	Killybegs Lower	Glenties
Doocrow	2,412	Banagh	Killymard	Donegal
Dooey	149	Banagh	Glencolumbkille	Glenties
Dooey	1,804	Boylagh	Lettermacaward	Glenties
Dooghan	119	Raphoe	Donaghmore	Strabane
Dooish	998	Raphoe	Raymoghy	Strabane
Dooish	1,089	Raphoe	Stranorlar	Stranorlar
Doon	344	Kilmacrenan	Kilmacrenan	Millford
Doonalt	268	Banagh	Glencolumbkille	Glenties
Doonan	183	Banagh	Killymard	Donegal
Doorabble	134	Raphoe	Raphoe	Letterkenny
Doorian	296	Boylagh	Inishkeel	Glenties
Dooros	85	Raphoe	Clonleigh	Strabane
Dore	964	Kilmacrenan	Tullaghobegly	Dunfanaghy
Downies	311	Kilmacrenan	Mevagh	Millford
Downies Barr	183	Kilmacrenan	Mevagh	Millford
Drean	200	Raphoe	Raymoghy	Letterkenny
Dreenan	295	Raphoe	Donaghmore	Stranorlar
Dresnagh	124	Raphoe	Urney	Strabane
Dristernan	508	Inishowen East	Culdaff	Inishowen
Dromore	349	Tirhugh	Drumhome	Ballyshannon
Dromore	389	Banagh	Inver	Donegal
Dromore	662	Kilmacrenan	Conwal	Letterkenny
Dromore	381	Raphoe	Leck	Letterkenny
Dromore	134	Raphoe	Clonleigh	Strabane
Dromore	144	Raphoe	Donaghmore	Stranorlar
Dromore Big	258	Raphoe	Taughboyne	Strabane
Dromore Little	73	Raphoe	Taughboyne	Strabane
Drum	176	Banagh	Glencolumbkille	Glenties
Drum & Ballynawall	108	Kilmacrenan	Clondavaddog	Millford
Drumabodan	329	Kilmacrenan	Kilmacrenan	Millford
Drumacloghan	210	Kilmacrenan	Tullyfern	Millford
Drumacrin	450	Tirhugh	Inishmacsaint	Ballyshannon
Drumadart	121	Banagh	Inver	Donegal
Drumadoney	102	Tirhugh	Donegal	Donegal
Drumadooey	227	Inishowen West	Fahan Upper	Londonderry
Drumaghy	116	Banagh	Inishkeel	Glenties
Drumaghy	168	Banagh	Killaghtee	Glenties
Drumagraa	525	Banagh	Inver	Donegal
Drumalough (or Lough Hill)	166	Banagh	Inishkeel	Glenties
Drumanaught	1,294	Raphoe	Conwal	Letterkenny
Drumaneany	1,074	Boylagh	Inishkeel	Glenties
Drumaneary	250	Banagh	Inver	Donegal
Drumaneel	113	Tirhugh	Drumhome	Donegal
Drumano	689	Banagh	Killybegs Upper	Glenties
Drumany	271	Raphoe	Leck	Letterkenny
Drumany	85	Kilmacrenan	Clondavaddog	Millford
Drumard	254	Banagh	Inver	Donegal
Drumardagh	332	Raphoe	Leck	Letterkenny
Drumark	156	Banagh	Killymard	Donegal
Drumatoland	487	Raphoe	Raymoghy	Strabane
Drumatrumman	390	Kilmacrenan	Tullyfern	Millford
Drumatumpher	202	Banagh	Inver	Donegal
Drumaville	1,298	Inishowen East	Clonca	Inishowen
Drumaville	369	Inishowen East	Culdaff	Inishowen
Drumavohy	187	Inishowen East	Clonca	Inishowen
Drumavohy and Ballybolagan	350	Kilmacrenan	Clondavaddog	Millford
Drumawark	502	Tirhugh	Templecarn	Donegal
Drumaweer	608	Inishowen East	Moville Lower	Inishowen
Drumballycasian	53	Inishowen East	Clonca	Inishowen
Drumbane	98	Raphoe	Urney	Strabane
Drumbar	144	Tirhugh	Donegal	Donegal
Drumbaran	209	Banagh	Inver	Donegal
Drumbaran	92	Banagh	Killybegs Lower	Glenties
Drumbarity	67	Banagh	Killybegs Upper	Glenties
Drumbarnet	255	Raphoe	Allsaints	Londonderry
Drumbarnet Lower	184	Raphoe	Raymoghy	Londonderry
Drumbarnet Middle	112	Raphoe	Raymoghy	Londonderry
Drumbarnet Upper	175	Raphoe	Raymoghy	Londonderry
Drumbarren	66	Tirhugh	Donegal	Donegal
Drumbeagh	391	Banagh	Inver	Donegal
Drumbeagh	75	Banagh	Killybegs Upper	Glenties
Drumbeg	93	Raphoe	Taughboyne	Strabane
Drumbeg (or Cloverhill)	126	Banagh	Inver	Donegal
Drumbern	171	Kilmacrenan	Tullyfern	Millford
Drumboarty	470	Banagh	Inver	Donegal
Drumboe Lower	331	Raphoe	Stranorlar	Stranorlar
Drumboe Upper	167	Raphoe	Stranorlar	Stranorlar
Drumboghill	980	Boylagh	Inishkeel	Glenties
Drumbologe	76	Kilmacrenan	Conwal	Letterkenny
Drumboy	325	Raphoe	Allsaints	Londonderry
Drumboy	143	Raphoe	Clonleigh	Strabane
Drumbrick	214	Kilmacrenan	Kilmacrenan	Millford
Drumbristan Glebe	99	Tirhugh	Drumhome	Donegal
Drumcannon	160	Raphoe	Donaghmore	Stranorlar
Drumcarbit	742	Inishowen East	Clonca	Inishowen
Drumcarn	353	Raphoe	Raymoghy	Letterkenny
Drumcavany	309	Kilmacrenan	Conwal	Letterkenny
Drumchory Glebe	115	Tirhugh	Drumhome	Donegal
Drumchrin	146	Tirhugh	Templecarn	Donegal
Drumcliff	59	Banagh	Killymard	Donegal
Drumcoe	454	Banagh	Inver	Donegal
Drumconcoose	393	Boylagh	Inishkeel	Glenties
Drumconor	445	Banagh	Inver	Donegal
Drumcroagh	148	Tirhugh	Donegal	Donegal
Drumcrow	236	Raphoe	Taughboyne	Strabane
Drumdeevin	401	Kilmacrenan	Kilmacrenan	Millford
Drumderrydonan	1,080	Raphoe	Kilteevoge	Stranorlar
Drumdoit	397	Raphoe	Urney	Strabane
Drumduff	146	Banagh	Inver	Donegal
Drumdutton	454	Kilmacrenan	Mevagh	Millford
Drumearn	116	Raphoe	Taughboyne	Strabane
Drumeasan	441	Kilmacrenan	Kilmacrenan	Dunfanaghy
Drumenan	1,012	Kilmacrenan	Conwal	Letterkenny
Drumenan	232	Raphoe	Taughboyne	Strabane
Drumevish	392	Raphoe	Donaghmore	Stranorlar
Drumfad	282	Kilmacrenan	Clondavaddog	Millford
Drumfad	164	Raphoe	Taughboyne	Strabane
Drumfad Lower	170	Kilmacrenan	Clondavaddog	Millford
Drumfad Upper	166	Kilmacrenan	Clondavaddog	Millford
Drumfergus	154	Raphoe	Donaghmore	Stranorlar
Drumfin	214	Banagh	Inver	Donegal
Drumfin (or Islandroy Barr)	159	Kilmacrenan	Mevagh	Millford
Drumgorman	313	Banagh	Inver	Donegal
Drumgorman Barr	79	Banagh	Inver	Donegal
Drumgornan	377	Banagh	Killymard	Donegal
Drumgowan	269	Tirhugh	Donegal	Donegal
Drumgreggan	83	Raphoe	Leck	Letterkenny
Drumgumberland	241	Raphoe	Convoy	Stranorlar
Drumgun	83	Banagh	Killymard	Donegal
Drumgun	193	Tirhugh	Templecarn	Donegal
Drumhaggart	490	Inishowen West	Burt	Londonderry
Drumhallagh Lower	149	Kilmacrenan	Killygarvan	Millford
Drumhallagh Upper	590	Kilmacrenan	Killygarvan	Millford
Drumharriff	250	Tirhugh	Templecarn	Donegal
Drumherrive	273	Kilmacrenan	Aughnish	Millford
Drumhome	303	Tirhugh	Drumhome	Ballyshannon
Druminardagh	242	Tirhugh	Donegal	Donegal
Druminargal	97	Raphoe	Clonleigh	Strabane
Druminderry Upper & Lower	585	Inishowen West	Fahan Lower	Inishowen
Drumineney	93	Raphoe	Raphoe	Strabane
Druminiscal	56	Banagh	Killaghtee	Donegal
Druminnin	308	Tirhugh	Donegal	Donegal
Drumirrin	565	Banagh	Inishkeel	Glenties
Drumkeeghan	334	Banagh	Killymard	Donegal
Drumkeelan	611	Banagh	Inver	Donegal
Drumkeen	558	Raphoe	Convoy	Stranorlar
Drumlackagh	759	Kilmacrenan	Mevagh	Millford
Drumlaghdrid	1,076	Boylagh	Templecrone	Glenties
Drumlaght	91	Tirhugh	Donegal	Donegal
Drumlaghtafin	271	Banagh	Inver	Donegal
Drumlask	171	Tirhugh	Drumhome	Donegal
Drumleavalliagh	67	Kilmacrenan	Clondahorky	Dunfanaghy
Drumlee	630	Inishowen East	Culdaff	Inishowen
Drumleene	337	Raphoe	Clonleigh	Strabane
Drumlonagher	136	Tirhugh	Donegal	Donegal
Drumlough	318	Inishowen West	Fahan Lower	Inishowen
Drumlougher	308	Raphoe	Allsaints	Londonderry
Drumlurgagh	156	Kilmacrenan	Kilmacrenan	Millford
Drummacachapple	111	Banagh	Inver	Donegal
Drummacacullen	306	Banagh	Inver	Donegal
Drummacaladdery	271	Kilmacrenan	Kilmacrenan	Millford
Drummacanoo	189	Kilmacrenan	Conwal	Letterkenny
Drumman	107	Kilmacrenan	Tullyfern	Millford
Drummanus Glebe	94	Tirhugh	Drumhome	Donegal
Drummay	262	Raphoe	Allsaints	Londonderry
Drummeenanagh	168	Banagh	Inver	Donegal
Drummeenanagh	265	Banagh	Killymard	Donegal
Drummenny Lower	162	Tirhugh	Donegal	Donegal
Drummenny Middle	152	Tirhugh	Donegal	Donegal
Drummenny Upper	196	Tirhugh	Donegal	Donegal
Drummonaghan (or Bridge End)	229	Kilmacrenan	Tullyfern	Millford
Drummucklagh	179	Raphoe	Taughboyne	Strabane
Drummurphy	383	Raphoe	Donaghmore	Strabane
Drumnabratty	86	Raphoe	Raphoe	Strabane
Drumnacarry	120	Banagh	Inver	Donegal
Drumnacarry	203	Banagh	Killymard	Donegal
Drumnacarry	286	Kilmacrenan	Clondahorky	Dunfanaghy
Drumnacart	29	Boylagh	Templecrone	Glenties
Drumnacart Mountn Pasture	856	Boylagh	Templecrone	Glenties
Drumnacraig	199	Kilmacrenan	Clondavaddog	Millford
Drumnacroil	154	Tirhugh	Drumhome	Donegal
Drumnacross	318	Boylagh	Killybegs Lower	Glenties
Drumnacross	133	Raphoe	Convoy	Stranorlar
Drumnafinnagle	178	Banagh	Kilcar	Glenties
Drumnagahan	66	Tirhugh	Donegal	Donegal
Drumnagroagh	162	Tirhugh	Kilbarron	Ballyshannon
Drumnaha	816	Boylagh	Inishkeel	Glenties
Drumnaha	87	Raphoe	Clonleigh	Strabane
Drumnaha	82	Raphoe	Urney	Strabane
Drumnaheark East	297	Banagh	Inver	Donegal
Drumnaheark West	94	Banagh	Inver	Donegal
Drumnahoagh	260	Raphoe	Leck	Letterkenny
Drumnahough	58	Raphoe	Conwal	Stranorlar
Drumnahough Mountain (or Meenadaura)	491	Raphoe	Conwal	Stranorlar
Drumnahoul	141	Tirhugh	Donegal	Donegal
Drumnakillew	289	Kilmacrenan	Clondahorky	Dunfanaghy
Drumnakilly	91	Banagh	Inver	Donegal
Drumnalifferny	226	Kilmacrenan	Gartan	Letterkenny
Drumnaliffierny Mountain	2,353	Kilmacrenan	Gartan	Dunfanaghy
Drumnalost	400	Banagh	Inver	Donegal
Drumnalough	612	Boylagh	Inishkeel	Glenties
Drumnaraw	206	Kilmacrenan	Clondahorky	Dunfanaghy
Drumnashammar	203	Kilmacrenan	Conwal	Letterkenny
Drumnasharragh	2,029	Kilmacrenan	Gartan	Letterkenny
Drumnashear	84	Raphoe	Killea	Londonderry
Drumnasillagh	764	Boylagh	Inishkeel	Glenties
Drumnaskea	108	Tirhugh	Templecarn	Donegal
Drumnaskea	314	Inishowen East	Clonca	Inishowen
Drumnaskea	272	Kilmacrenan	Aghanunshin	Letterkenny
Drumnasorn	67	Banagh	Killaghtee	Donegal
Drumnatinny	650	Kilmacrenan	Raymunterdoney	Dunfanaghy
Drumnatinny Barr	697	Kilmacrenan	Raymunterdoney	Dunfanaghy
Drumnawooa	60	Kilmacrenan	Gartan	Letterkenny
Drumoghill	272	Raphoe	Raymoghy	Letterkenny
Drumoghill	340	Kilmacrenan	Kilmacrenan	Millford
Drumoske	112	Tirhugh	Drumhome	Ballyshannon
Drumrainy	231	Banagh	Inver	Donegal
Drumrat	149	Tirhugh	Donegal	Donegal
Drumreagh	189	Banagh	Kilcar	Glenties
Drumroe	52	Banagh	Glencolumbkille	Glenties
Drumrone	264	Banagh	Inver	Donegal
Drumroosk	126	Banagh	Killymard	Donegal
Drumroosk East	103	Banagh	Killymard	Donegal
Drumroosk Middle	100	Banagh	Killymard	Donegal
Drumroosk West	100	Banagh	Killymard	Donegal
Drumsallagh	136	Kilmacrenan	Gartan	Letterkenny
Drumshantony	16	Boylagh	Inishkeel	Glenties
Drumskellan	1,254	Inishowen West	Muff	Londonderry
Drumstevlin	153	Banagh	Killymard	Donegal
Drung	197	Inishowen East	Clonca	Inishowen
Drung	1,757	Inishowen East	Moville Upper	Inishowen
Duck Island	3	Boylagh	Templecrone	Glenties
Dunaff	1,174	Inishowen East	Clonmany	Inishowen
Dunagard	289	Inishowen East	Clonca	Inishowen
Dundawoona Point	9	Banagh	Kilcar	Glenties
Dundee	138	Raphoe	Taughboyne	Strabane
Dundooan Lower	655	Kilmacrenan	Mevagh	Millford
Dundooan Upper	141	Kilmacrenan	Mevagh	Millford
Dundrean	602	Inishowen West	Burt	Londonderry
Dundrudian	60	Kilmacrenan	Clondahorky	Dunfanaghy
Dunduffsfort	299	Raphoe	Raymoghy	Londonderry
**Dunfanaghy**	Town	Kilmacrenan	Clondahorky	Dunfanaghy
Dunfanaghy	147	Kilmacrenan	Clondahorky	Dunfanaghy
**Dunglow**	Town	Boylagh	Templecrone	Glenties
Dunglow	406	Boylagh	Templecrone	Glenties
Dungorman	254	Raphoe	Donaghmore	Strabane
**Dunkineely**	Town	Banagh	Killaghtee	Donegal
Dunkineely	136	Banagh	Killaghtee	Donegal
Dunlewy Far	4,033	Kilmacrenan	Tullaghobegly	Dunfanaghy
Dunlewy Near	1,547	Kilmacrenan	Tullaghobegly	Dunfanaghy
Dunmore	1,730	Kilmacrenan	Raymunterdoney	Dunfanaghy
Dunmore	141	Boylagh	Templecrone	Glenties
Dunmore	383	Raphoe	Killea	Londonderry
Dunmore	371	Kilmacrenan	Mevagh	Millford
Dunmore	496	Kilmacrenan	Tullyfern	Millford
Dunmuckrum	823	Tirhugh	Inishmacsaint	Ballyshannon
Dunnaloob	36	Raphoe	Urney	Strabane
Dunree	212	Inishowen West	Desertegny	Inishowen
Dunross	604	Inishowen East	Clonca	Inishowen
Duntinny	135	Kilmacrenan	Clondavaddog	Millford
Dunwiley	490	Raphoe	Stranorlar	Stranorlar
Durnesh	239	Tirhugh	Drumhome	Ballyshannon
Eagle's Nest	1	Banagh	Inver	Donegal
Eddrim Glebe	641	Banagh	Killymard	Donegal
Eden	248	Boylagh	Inishkeel	Glenties
Edenacarnan North	211	Kilmacrenan	Kilmacrenan	Letterkenny
Edenacarnan South	230	Kilmacrenan	Kilmacrenan	Letterkenny
Edenagor	117	Tirhugh	Kilbarron	Ballyshannon
Edenamoghil	269	Raphoe	Donaghmore	Stranorlar
Edenamuck	165	Banagh	Inver	Donegal
Edenfinfreagh	393	Boylagh	Inishkeel	Glenties
Edenmore	200	Raphoe	Clonleigh	Strabane
Edenmore	258	Raphoe	Donaghmore	Stranorlar
Edergole	4,370	Banagh	Killymard	Donegal
Edergole	196	Banagh	Inishkeel	Glenties
Edernish Island	10	Boylagh	Templecrone	Glenties
Edernish Island	7	Boylagh	Templecrone	Glenties
Edernishfree Island	28	Boylagh	Templecrone	Glenties
Egglybane	385	Raphoe	Donaghmore	Strabane
Eglish	2,554	Banagh	Killymard	Donegal
Eighter Island	60	Boylagh	Templecrone	Glenties
Eighterross	195	Kilmacrenan	Aghanunshin	Letterkenny
Elaghbeg	482	Inishowen West	Burt	Londonderry
Eleven Ballyboes	408	Inishowen East	Moville Lower	Inishowen
Ellistrin Big (or Illistrin Big)	241	Kilmacrenan	Conwal	Letterkenny
Ellistrin Little (or Illistrin Little)	192	Kilmacrenan	Conwal	Letterkenny
Elly	488	Kilmacrenan	Killygarvan	Millford
Errarooey Beg	195	Kilmacrenan	Raymunterdoney	Dunfanaghy
Errarooey More	542	Kilmacrenan	Raymunterdoney	Dunfanaghy
Errity	293	Raphoe	Raymoghy	Letterkenny
Errity Churchland	44	Raphoe	Raymoghy	Letterkenny
Eskaheen	1,347	Inishowen West	Muff	Londonderry
Evishbreedy	1,059	Inishowen West	Fahan Lower	Inishowen
Fahan Level (Intake)	390	Inishowen West	Fahan Upper	Londonderry
Fahykeen	105	Kilmacrenan	Conwal	Letterkenny
Faiafannan	204	Banagh	Killybegs Upper	Glenties
Falbane	163	Kilmacrenan	Gartan	Letterkenny
Falcarragh	186	Kilmacrenan	Tullaghobegly	Dunfanaghy
Falchorrib	977	Boylagh	Templecrone	Glenties
Falgarrow	388	Raphoe	Kilteevoge	Stranorlar
Fallagowan	1,323	Boylagh	Templecrone	Glenties
Fallaneas	124	Kilmacrenan	Clondavaddog	Millford
Fallard (or Calhame)	269	Kilmacrenan	Conwal	Letterkenny
Fallask	1,009	Inishowen West	Fahan Lower	Inishowen
Faltybanes	100	Kilmacrenan	Clondavaddog	Millford
Fanaghans	168	Banagh	Inver	Donegal
Fanavolty	216	Kilmacrenan	Clondavaddog	Millford
Farnagh	146	Kilmacrenan	Aughnish	Millford
Farragans	374	Boylagh	Lettermacaward	Glenties
Farragans	505	Raphoe	Convoy	Stranorlar
Farranmacbride	56	Banagh	Glencolumbkille	Glenties
Farsetmore	125	Raphoe	Leck	Letterkenny
Faugher	329	Kilmacrenan	Clondahorky	Dunfanaghy
Faugher	46	Banagh	Glencolumbkille	Glenties
Faugher Mountain	436	Banagh	Glencolumbkille	Glenties
Fawans	385	Kilmacrenan	Kilmacrenan	Millford
Fawnaboy	1,824	Kilmacrenan	Tullaghobegly	Dunfanaghy
Fawninoughan	373	Kilmacrenan	Tullyfern	Millford
Fawnmore	352	Kilmacrenan	Clondahorky	Dunfanaghy
Faymore	873	Kilmacrenan	Clondahorky	Dunfanaghy
Fearn	904	Raphoe	Urney	Strabane
Feddyglass	385	Raphoe	Taughboyne	Strabane
Fegart	308	Inishowen East	Clonmany	Inishowen
Fiagry	183	Inishowen West	Fahan Upper	Londonderry
Figart	134	Kilmacrenan	Clondahorky	Dunfanaghy
Figart	273	Raphoe	Raphoe	Strabane
Fincashel	500	Tirhugh	Templecarn	Donegal
Findrum	381	Raphoe	Convoy	Stranorlar
Finnabanes	188	Tirhugh	Donegal	Donegal
Finnadoos	236	Tirhugh	Donegal	Donegal
Finnadork Glebe	223	Raphoe	Convoy	Stranorlar
Finner	1,582	Tirhugh	Inishmacsaint	Ballyshannon
Fintown	846	Boylagh	Inishkeel	Glenties
Fintragh	3,145	Banagh	Killybegs Upper	Glenties
Finver	127	Kilmacrenan	Mevagh	Millford
Flemingstown	129	Raphoe	Raphoe	Strabane
Flughland	170	Inishowen East	Moville Upper	Inishowen
Foffanagh	462	Inishowen West	Fahan Lower	Inishowen
Fogher	442	Kilmacrenan	Tullyfern	Millford
Fortstewart	138	Kilmacrenan	Aughnish	Millford
Foxhall	171	Kilmacrenan	Conwal	Letterkenny
Foyagh	133	Tirhugh	Drumhome	Ballyshannon
Foyfin	213	Raphoe	Urney	Strabane
Freehold	218	Inishowen East	Culdaff	Inishowen
Friarsbush	33	Tirhugh	Donegal	Donegal
Friary	349	Banagh	Killymard	Donegal
Fycorranagh	88	Raphoe	Leck	Letterkenny
Gaddyduff	165	Inishowen East	Clonmany	Inishowen
Galdonagh	537	Raphoe	Raymoghy	Strabane
Galdonagh Glebe	537	Raphoe	Raymoghy	Strabane
Galwolie	1,467	Boylagh	Lettermacaward	Glenties
Galwolie	361	Raphoe	Kilteevoge	Stranorlar
Gannew and Curreen	332	Banagh	Glencolumbkille	Glenties
Gargrim	258	Banagh	Inver	Donegal
Garrisonhill	195	Raphoe	Donaghmore	Stranorlar
Garrowcarry	758	Kilmacrenan	Kilmacrenan	Letterkenny
Garrowchuill	151	Banagh	Inishkeel	Glenties
Garrygort	606	Kilmacrenan	Tullyfern	Millford
Garrymore	158	Kilmacrenan	Tullyfern	Millford
Garshooey	375	Raphoe	Allsaints	Londonderry
Gartan (or Bellville)	174	Kilmacrenan	Gartan	Letterkenny
Gartan Mountain	4,124	Kilmacrenan	Gartan	Letterkenny
Garvagh	183	Tirhugh	Donegal	Donegal
Garvan	516	Raphoe	Kilteevoge	Stranorlar
Garvanagh	827	Tirhugh	Kilbarron	Ballyshannon
Garvary	143	Kilmacrenan	Clondahorky	Dunfanaghy
Garvary	710	Inishowen West	Fahan Upper	Londonderry
Garvary Mountain	767	Kilmacrenan	Clondahorky	Dunfanaghy
Garvegort Glebe	411	Banagh	Killybegs Lower	Glenties
Garveross	125	Banagh	Glencolumbkille	Glenties
Garveross Mountain & Beefan	228	Banagh	Glencolumbkille	Glenties
Gilbertstown	562	Banagh	Killaghtee	Donegal
Gillstown	79	Raphoe	Taughboyne	Strabane
Glack	377	Kilmacrenan	Clondahorky	Dunfanaghy
Glack (or Bohullion)	296	Inishowen West	Inch	Londonderry
Glackadrumman	576	Inishowen East	Clonca	Inishowen
Glar	113	Raphoe	Allsaints	Londonderry
Glasalt (or Treanfasy)	1,448	Inishowen East	Donagh	Inishowen
Glasbolie	716	Tirhugh	Drumhome	Ballyshannon
Glashagh	1,919	Kilmacrenan	Tullaghobegly	Dunfanaghy
Glashagh Beg	867	Raphoe	Kilteevoge	Stranorlar
Glashagh More	1,123	Raphoe	Kilteevoge	Stranorlar
Glashbeggan	144	Boylagh	Templecrone	Glenties
Glashedy Island	7	Inishowen East	Clonmany	Inishowen
Glashydevet	784	Raphoe	Kilteevoge	Stranorlar
Glaskeeragh	1,054	Tirhugh	Templecarn	Donegal
Glasly	176	Raphoe	Convoy	Stranorlar
Glasmullan	1,073	Inishowen West	Mintiaghs or Barr of Inch	Inishowen
Glasmullan	40	Raphoe	Killea	Londonderry
Glasnant	83	Kilmacrenan	Kilmacrenan	Millford
Glass Island (or Illancarragh)	4	Kilmacrenan	Tullaghobegly	Dunfanaghy
Glassan	642	Kilmacrenan	Clondahorky	Dunfanaghy
Glasserchoo	547	Kilmacrenan	Tullaghobegly	Dunfanaghy
Glebe	76	Tirhugh	Donegal	Donegal
Glebe	69	Kilmacrenan	Tullaghobegly	Dunfanaghy
Glebe	81	Boylagh	Inishkeel	Glenties
Glebe	101	Banagh	Killybegs Upper	Glenties
Glebe	66	Boylagh	Lettermacaward	Glenties
Glebe	193	Inishowen West	Desertegny	Inishowen
Glebe	267	Inishowen East	Donagh	Inishowen
Glebe	99	Inishowen East	Moville Upper	Inishowen
Glebe	388	Kilmacrenan	Aghanunshin	Letterkenny
Glebe	94	Kilmacrenan	Gartan	Letterkenny
Glebe	7	Raphoe	Raymoghy	Letterkenny
Glebe	8	Inishowen West	Fahan Upper	Londonderry
Glebe	8	Raphoe	Taughboyne	Londonderry
Glebe	6	Kilmacrenan	Killygarvan	Millford
Glebe	184	Kilmacrenan	Mevagh	Millford
Glebe	38	Raphoe	Clonleigh	Strabane
Glebe	35	Raphoe	Kilteevoge	Stranorlar
Glebe	77	Raphoe	Stranorlar	Stranorlar
Glebe (or Kilconnell)	197	Kilmacrenan	Kilmacrenan	Millford
Glebe (or Straid)	83	Banagh	Glencolumbkille	Glenties
Glebe Large	59	Inishowen West	Fahan Upper	Londonderry
Glebehill	10	Kilmacrenan	Gartan	Letterkenny
Glen	68	Banagh	Killymard	Donegal
Glen Lower	356	Kilmacrenan	Tullyfern	Millford
Glen Upper	274	Kilmacrenan	Tullyfern	Millford
Glenaboghil	469	Boylagh	Inishkeel	Glenties
Glenalla	1,302	Kilmacrenan	Aughnish	Millford
Glenard	1,147	Inishowen West	Muff	Londonderry
Glenbeagh	751	Kilmacrenan	Gartan	Letterkenny
Glencar Irish	254	Kilmacrenan	Conwal	Letterkenny
Glencar Scotch	357	Kilmacrenan	Conwal	Letterkenny
Glencash	119	Raphoe	Clonleigh	Strabane
Glencaw	528	Inishowen East	Moville Upper	Inishowen
Glencoagh	344	Banagh	Inver	Donegal
Glencoagh	115	Banagh	Killymard	Donegal
Glencovet	169	Raphoe	Donaghmore	Stranorlar
Glencross	395	Kilmacrenan	Killygarvan	Millford
Glencrow	268	Inishowen East	Moville Upper	Inishowen
Glendowanbeg	188	Kilmacrenan	Gartan	Letterkenny
Gleneely	292	Raphoe	Donaghmore	Stranorlar
Glenfad	265	Raphoe	Clonleigh	Strabane
Glengad	2,569	Inishowen East	Culdaff	Inishowen
Glengesh	1,626	Banagh	Killybegs Lower	Glenties
Glengillagrana High	480	Kilmacrenan	Mevagh	Millford
Glenieraragh	1,166	Kilmacrenan	Mevagh	Millford
Glenineeny	77	Kilmacrenan	Mevagh	Millford
Glenkeen	157	Kilmacrenan	Tullyfern	Millford
Glenkeeragh	555	Kilmacrenan	Conwal	Letterkenny
Glenkeeran	422	Raphoe	Raphoe	Letterkenny
Glenkeo	215	Kilmacrenan	Kilmacrenan	Letterkenny
Glenkeo	1,157	Kilmacrenan	Mevagh	Millford
Glenleary	332	Kilmacrenan	Aughnish	Millford
Glenlee	144	Banagh	Killybegs Upper	Glenties
Glenlough	2,231	Banagh	Glencolumbkille	Glenties
Glenmacannive	480	Boylagh	Inishkeel	Glenties
Glenmakee	716	Inishowen East	Donagh	Inishowen
Glenmaquin Lower	793	Raphoe	Raphoe	Letterkenny
Glenmaquin Upper	404	Raphoe	Raphoe	Letterkenny
Glenmenagh	658	Kilmacrenan	Mevagh	Millford
Glennagiveny	1,697	Inishowen East	Moville Lower	Inishowen
Glennahilt	79	Boylagh	Templecrone	Glenties
Glenoory	277	Kilmacrenan	Mevagh	Millford
Glenoughty	297	Raphoe	Leck	Letterkenny
Glenree	449	Kilmacrenan	Mevagh	Millford
Glensmoil	213	Raphoe	Clonleigh	Strabane
Glentidaly	416	Kilmacrenan	Tullyfern	Millford
Glentidaly Glebe	255	Kilmacrenan	Tullyfern	Millford
**Glenties**	Town	Boylagh	Inishkeel	Glenties
Glentillid	309	Raphoe	Leck	Letterkenny
Glentogher (or Carrowmore)	5,784	Inishowen East	Donagh	Inishowen
Glentornan	2,731	Kilmacrenan	Tullaghobegly	Dunfanaghy
Glentown	241	Raphoe	Taughboyne	Strabane
Glinsk	684	Kilmacrenan	Clondavaddog	Millford
Go Island	9	Kilmacrenan	Tullaghobegly	Dunfanaghy
Gobnascale	120	Raphoe	Convoy	Stranorlar
Gola	424	Kilmacrenan	Tullaghobegly	Dunfanaghy
Gola Island	424	Kilmacrenan	Tullaghobegly	Dunfanaghy
Goladoo	217	Tirhugh	Donegal	Donegal
Golamore & beg Islands	1	Kilmacrenan	Clondavaddog	Millford
Golan	1,185	Kilmacrenan	Kilmacrenan	Millford
Goland	762	Raphoe	Donaghmore	Stranorlar
Golard	517	Tirhugh	Drumhome	Donegal
Goldrum	451	Kilmacrenan	Kilmacrenan	Millford
Goorey	203	Inishowen East	Clonca	Inishowen
Gort	4	Inishowen East	Clonca	Inishowen
Gort	1	Inishowen East	Clonca	Inishowen
Gort	1	Inishowen East	Culdaff	Inishowen
Gort	2	Raphoe	Clonleigh	Strabane
Gort Glebe	5	Inishowen East	Donagh	Inishowen
Gort Glebe	12	Raphoe	Raphoe	Strabane
Gort Glebe (or Cooladerry)	11	Raphoe	Raphoe	Strabane
Gort North	2	Inishowen East	Moville Upper	Inishowen
Gort South	3	Inishowen East	Moville Upper	Inishowen
Gortadragon	134	Raphoe	Convoy	Stranorlar
Gortahork	169	Kilmacrenan	Tullaghobegly	Dunfanaghy
Gortahork	286	Raphoe	Donaghmore	Stranorlar
Gortalaban	99	Kilmacrenan	Kilmacrenan	Letterkenny
Gortalia	133	Banagh	Kilcar	Glenties
Gortanny	125	Inishowen East	Moville Upper	Inishowen
Gortaquigley	149	Raphoe	Raphoe	Strabane
Gortaward	229	Banagh	Inver	Donegal
Gortaway	182	Kilmacrenan	Aughnish	Millford
Gortcalvy	798	Kilmacrenan	Tullyfern	Millford
Gortcormacan	594	Inishowen West	Burt	Londonderry
Gortcross	66	Kilmacrenan	Killygarvan	Millford
Gortfad	262	Raphoe	Donaghmore	Strabane
Gortflugh	221	Kilmacrenan	Killygarvan	Millford
Gortgarra	177	Boylagh	Templecrone	Glenties
Gortgranagh	69	Raphoe	Clonleigh	Strabane
Gortin	39	Kilmacrenan	Tullyfern	Millford
Gortin North	227	Raphoe	Clonleigh	Strabane
Gortiness	101	Raphoe	Kilteevoge	Stranorlar
Gortinessy	275	Tirhugh	Templecarn	Donegal
Gortinlieve	306	Raphoe	Allsaints	Londonderry
Gortinreagh	110	Raphoe	Clonleigh	Strabane
Gortins South	183	Raphoe	Clonleigh	Strabane
Gortkilly	142	Raphoe	Urney	Strabane
Gortleck	1,356	Inishowen West	Desertegny	Inishowen
Gortlee	213	Kilmacrenan	Conwal	Letterkenny
Gortletteragh	261	Raphoe	Stranorlar	Stranorlar
Gortlosky	88	Banagh	Killymard	Donegal
Gortlough	138	Kilmacrenan	Killygarvan	Millford
Gortlush	112	Raphoe	Allsaints	Londonderry
Gortmacall Beg	340	Kilmacrenan	Kilmacrenan	Millford
Gortmacall More	388	Kilmacrenan	Kilmacrenan	Millford
Gortnabrade	425	Kilmacrenan	Mevagh	Millford
Gortnacart Glebe	681	Banagh	Killybegs Lower	Glenties
Gortnacor	119	Kilmacrenan	Clondavaddog	Millford
Gortnacorrib	289	Kilmacrenan	Kilmacrenan	Letterkenny
Gortnagole	165	Raphoe	Clonleigh	Strabane
Gortnagrace	417	Raphoe	Urney	Strabane
Gortnalaragh	223	Kilmacrenan	Kilmacrenan	Millford
Gortnaleck	1,586	Kilmacrenan	Clondahorky	Dunfanaghy
Gortnalughoge	187	Kilmacrenan	Mevagh	Millford
Gortnamona and Clooney	144	Kilmacrenan	Clondavaddog	Millford
Gortnamoney	19	Raphoe	Taughboyne	Strabane
Gortnamuck	582	Raphoe	Donaghmore	Strabane
Gortnamucklagh	432	Boylagh	Inishkeel	Glenties
Gortnasate	75	Boylagh	Templecrone	Glenties
Gortnasillagh	601	Boylagh	Inishkeel	Glenties
Gortnaskea	1,922	Inishowen West	Fahan Upper	Londonderry
Gortnaskeagh	433	Kilmacrenan	Kilmacrenan	Millford
Gortnatraw North	282	Kilmacrenan	Clondavaddog	Millford
Gortnatraw South	807	Kilmacrenan	Clondavaddog	Millford
Gortnavern	656	Kilmacrenan	Conwal	Letterkenny
Gortnavern	740	Kilmacrenan	Tullyfern	Millford
Gortnavilly	76	Raphoe	Clonleigh	Strabane
Gortnesk	68	Raphoe	Raphoe	Strabane
Gortree	378	Raphoe	Allsaints	Londonderry
Gortyarrigan	632	Inishowen West	Desertegny	Inishowen
Graffy	406	Boylagh	Inishkeel	Glenties
Graffy	136	Raphoe	Urney	Strabane
Grahamsland	284	Raphoe	Donaghmore	Strabane
Grahamstown	65	Tirhugh	Drumhome	Ballyshannon
Grange	403	Inishowen West	Burt	Londonderry
Grange	588	Inishowen West	Inch	Londonderry
Gransha	446	Inishowen West	Fahan Lower	Inishowen
Grawky	330	Raphoe	Raymoghy	Letterkenny
Grawky Glebe	70	Raphoe	Raymoghy	Letterkenny
Greaghs	301	Tirhugh	Drumhome	Donegal
Greaghs Barr (or Meenavanaghan)	232	Tirhugh	Drumhome	Donegal
Green Island	2	Banagh	Killaghtee	Donegal
Green Island	1	Kilmacrenan	Clondavaddog	Millford
Greenan	1,477	Banagh	Killymard	Donegal
Greenans	308	Boylagh	Inishkeel	Glenties
Greenfield	55	Raphoe	Convoy	Stranorlar
Greenfort Demesne	145	Kilmacrenan	Clondavaddog	Millford
Greenfort Island	2	Kilmacrenan	Clondavaddog	Millford
Greenhill	100	Kilmacrenan	Aghanunshin	Letterkenny
Greenhills	8	Raphoe	Stranorlar	Stranorlar
Gregstown	86	Tirhugh	Donegal	Donegal
Greyhill	166	Kilmacrenan	Clondahorky	Dunfanaghy
Grogagh	126	Kilmacrenan	Clondahorky	Dunfanaghy
Grousehall	2,037	Tirhugh	Templecarn	Donegal
Grovehall (or Newtowngrove)	196	Kilmacrenan	Kilmacrenan	Millford
Gull Island	3	Banagh	Glencolumbkille	Glenties
Gull Island	3	Kilmacrenan	Kilmacrenan	Millford
Gulladoo	1,086	Inishowen East	Moville Lower	Inishowen
Guystown	113	Raphoe	Clonleigh	Strabane
Habbitstown	73	Raphoe	Raphoe	Strabane
Halftown	106	Raphoe	Urney	Strabane
Hall Demesne	360	Banagh	Inver	Donegal
Haugh	202	Banagh	Killymard	Donegal
Haughey's Isle	6	Raphoe	Leck	Letterkenny
Haw	128	Raphoe	Taughboyne	Londonderry
Haw	131	Raphoe	Clonleigh	Strabane
Heneys	334	Banagh	Killymard	Donegal
Highbank	66	Raphoe	Raymoghy	Letterkenny
Highglen	800	Kilmacrenan	Mevagh	Millford
Hollands	109	Raphoe	Clonleigh	Strabane
Holmes	51	Banagh	Killymard	Donegal
Hungersmother	154	Raphoe	Raymoghy	Londonderry
Illan Phililpboy	7	Tirhugh	Templecarn	Donegal
Illanacarragh (or Glass Island)	4	Kilmacrenan	Tullaghobegly	Dunfanaghy
Illanaran Island	13	Boylagh	Templecrone	Glenties
Illancrone Island	6	Boylagh	Templecrone	Glenties
Illanfad	1	Boylagh	Inishkeel	Glenties
Illann hurry	5	Kilmacrenan	Mevagh	Millford
Illies	2,293	Inishowen West	Fahan Lower	Inishowen
Illion	639	Boylagh	Templecrone	Glenties
Imlick	169	Raphoe	Killea	Londonderry
Inch Level (Intake)	292	Inishowen West	Inch	Londonderry
Inishal	70	Boylagh	Templecrone	Glenties
Inishbarnog Island	12	Boylagh	Inishkeel	Glenties
Inishbeg	23	Kilmacrenan	Tullaghobegly	Dunfanaghy
Inishbofin	297	Kilmacrenan	Tullaghobegly	Dunfanaghy
Inishcoo	109	Boylagh	Templecrone	Glenties
Inishdooey	87	Kilmacrenan	Tullaghobegly	Dunfanaghy
Inishduff	3	Banagh	Kilcar	Glenties
Inisheane	19	Boylagh	Templecrone	Glenties
Inishfad	180	Tirhugh	Drumhome	Ballyshannon
Inishfaugh	2	Kilmacrenan	Mevagh	Millford
Inishfree Lower	45	Boylagh	Templecrone	Glenties
Inishfree Upper	341	Boylagh	Templecrone	Glenties
Inishgoosk	13	Tirhugh	Templecarn	Donegal
Inishillintry	12	Boylagh	Templecrone	Glenties
Inishinny	17	Tirhugh	Drumhome	Ballyshannon
Inishinny	62	Kilmacrenan	Tullaghobegly	Dunfanaghy
Inishinny	39	Boylagh	Templecrone	Glenties
Inishinny	8	Boylagh	Templecrone	Glenties
Inishkecragh	46	Boylagh	Templecrone	Glenties
Inishkeel	80	Boylagh	Inishkeel	Glenties
Inishmacadurn (or Rutland Island)	312	Boylagh	Templecrone	Glenties
Inishmeal	18	Boylagh	Templecrone	Glenties
Inishmeane	117	Kilmacrenan	Tullaghobegly	Dunfanaghy
Inishnabo	4	Tirhugh	Drumhome	Donegal
Inishnagor	4	Tirhugh	Drumhome	Donegal
Inishowen Island	1	Boylagh	Inishkeel	Glenties
Inishpat	17	Tirhugh	Drumhome	Donegal
Inishsirrer	108	Kilmacrenan	Tullaghobegly	Dunfanaghy
Inishtrahull	113	Inishowen East	Clonca	Inishowen
Inishyweel	2	Kilmacrenan	Kilmacrenan	Millford
Inniskil	471	Kilmacrenan	Gartan	Letterkenny
Inniskil	95	Kilmacrenan	Killygarvan	Millford
Inver Glebe	164	Banagh	Inver	Donegal
Ironworks	80	Raphoe	Stranorlar	Stranorlar
Island Beg	5	Raphoe	Clonleigh	Strabane
Island More	149	Raphoe	Clonleigh	Strabane
Island Reagh	11	Kilmacrenan	Mevagh	Millford
Island Roy	91	Kilmacrenan	Mevagh	Millford
Islandroy Barr (or Drumfin)	159	Kilmacrenan	Mevagh	Millford
Juniper Island	1	Kilmacrenan	Clondahorky	Dunfanaghy
Keadew	983	Boylagh	Templecrone	Glenties
Keadew Lower	119	Tirhugh	Donegal	Donegal
Keadew Upper	2,342	Tirhugh	Donegal	Donegal
Keeldrum	110	Tirhugh	Donegal	Donegal
Keeldrum Lower	215	Kilmacrenan	Tullaghobegly	Dunfanaghy
Keeldrum Upper	3,634	Kilmacrenan	Tullaghobegly	Dunfanaghy
Keeloges	440	Banagh	Inver	Donegal
Keeloges	553	Kilmacrenan	Conwal	Letterkenny
Keeloges	109	Raphoe	Clonleigh	Strabane
Keeloges, Bauville, and Clonglash	727	Inishowen West	Fahan Lower	Inishowen
Keenagh	226	Inishowen East	Clonea	Inishowen
Keenaghan	194	Banagh	Kilcar	Glenties
Keenaghan	355	Kilmacrenan	Kilmacrenan	Letterkenny
Keeranbane	479	Inishowen East	Moville Upper	Inishowen
Kellysmeadow	3	Raphoe	Urney	Strabane
Keranstown	60	Kilmacrenan	Killygarvan	Millford
Keshends	70	Raphoe	Allsaints	Londonderry
Kilaned	128	Banagh	Glencolumbkille	Glenties
Kilbarron	384	Tirhugh	Kilbarron	Ballyshannon
Kilbeg	214	Banagh	Kilcar	Glenties
Kilcaddan	193	Raphoe	Donaghmore	Stranorlar
**Kilcar**	Town	Banagh	Kilcar	Glenties
Kilcar	233	Banagh	Kilcar	Glenties
Kilcasey	452	Banagh	Kilcar	Glenties
Kilcashel	121	Banagh	Inishkeel	Glenties
Kilclooney Beg	257	Boylagh	Inishkeel	Glenties
**Kilclooney More**	592	Boylagh	Inishkeel	Glenties
Kilconnell (or Glebe)	197	Kilmacrenan	Kilmacrenan	Millford
Kilcreen	208	Kilmacrenan	Aughnish	Millford
Kildarragh	1,019	Kilmacrenan	Clondahorky	Dunfanaghy
Kildoney Glebe	508	Tirhugh	Kilbarron	Ballyshannon
Kildrum Lower	246	Raphoe	Allsaints	Londonderry
Kildrum Upper	306	Raphoe	Allsaints	Londonderry
Kilgole	132	Tirhugh	Drumhome	Donegal
Kilgoly	64	Banagh	Glencolumbkille	Glenties
Kilgort	147	Raphoe	Taughboyne	Londonderry
Kilkenny	143	Boylagh	Inishkeel	Glenties
Kill	541	Kilmacrenan	Clondahorky	Dunfanaghy
Kill	207	Banagh	Kilcar	Glenties
Kill	549	Kilmacrenan	Mevagh	Millford
Killaghtee	135	Banagh	Killaghtee	Donegal
Killasteever	68	Banagh	Inishkeel	Glenties
Killavee	43	Kilmacrenan	Clondavaddog	Millford
Killeen	217	Tirhugh	Kilbarron	Ballyshannon
Killhill and Rosskirk	561	Kilmacrenan	Clondavaddog	Millford
Killin	466	Banagh	Inver	Donegal
Killin	287	Inishowen East	Clonca	Inishowen
Killinangel Beg	318	Tirhugh	Drumhome	Ballyshannon
Killinangel More	126	Tirhugh	Drumhome	Ballyshannon
Killindarragh	149	Boylagh	Templecrone	Glenties
Killoughcarran	598	Kilmacrenan	Kilmacrenan	Dunfanaghy
Killult	451	Kilmacrenan	Tullaghobegly	Dunfanaghy
Killultan	192	Banagh	Killaghtee	Donegal
**Killybegs**	Town	Banagh	Killybegs Upper	Glenties
Killybegs	325	Banagh	Killybegs Upper	Glenties
Killyclug	465	Kilmacrenan	Conwal	Letterkenny
Killycolman	135	Kilmacrenan	Killygarvan	Millford
Killydesert	304	Kilmacrenan	Kilmacrenan	Letterkenny
Killydonnell	536	Kilmacrenan	Aughnish	Millford
Killygarvan Lower	121	Kilmacrenan	Killygarvan	Millford
Killygarvan Upper	147	Kilmacrenan	Killygarvan	Millford
**Killygordon**	Town	Raphoe	Donaghmore	Stranorlar
Killygordon	409	Raphoe	Donaghmore	Stranorlar
Killylastin	499	Kilmacrenan	Conwal	Letterkenny
Killymasny	1,445	Raphoe	Conwal	Letterkenny
Killynure (or Wilsons Fort)	356	Raphoe	Convoy	Stranorlar
Killyverry	276	Raphoe	Raymoghy	Londonderry
Kilmackilloo	444	Kilmacrenan	Clondahorky	Dunfanaghy
Kilmackilvenny, Barr of (or Monreagh)	930	Inishowen West	Fahan Upper	Londonderry
Kilmacreddan	268	Banagh	Inver	Donegal
**Kilmacrenan**	Town	Kilmacrenan	Kilmacrenan	Millford
Kilmacrenan	233	Kilmacrenan	Kilmacrenan	Millford
Kilmonaster Lower	212	Raphoe	Clonleigh	Strabane
Kilmonaster Middle	257	Raphoe	Clonleigh	Strabane
Kilmore	239	Kilmacrenan	Gartan	Letterkenny
Kilnpark	64	Raphoe	Clonleigh	Strabane
Kilpheak	493	Kilmacrenan	Conwal	Letterkenny
Kilrean	431	Raphoe	Kilteevoge	Stranorlar
Kilrean Lower	322	Boylagh	Killybegs Lower	Glenties
Kilrean Upper	1,503	Boylagh	Killybegs Lower	Glenties
Kilross	154	Raphoe	Stranorlar	Stranorlar
Kiltole	307	Raphoe	Raphoe	Strabane
Kiltooris	192	Boylagh	Inishkeel	Glenties
Kiltown	206	Raphoe	Donaghmore	Stranorlar
Kiltoy	136	Kilmacrenan	Aghanunshin	Letterkenny
Kiltyfanned	383	Banagh	Glencolumbkille	Glenties
Kiltyfergal	449	Raphoe	Kilteevoge	Stranorlar
Kilwarry	88	Kilmacrenan	Tullyfern	Millford
Kimmid	255	Tirhugh	Templecarn	Donegal
Kinacaslough	106	Boylagh	Templecrone	Glenties
Kincraigy	264	Raphoe	Raymoghy	Letterkenny
Kincrum	404	Boylagh	Inishkeel	Glenties
Kindroghed	414	Inishowen East	Culdaff	Inishowen
Kindrum	219	Kilmacrenan	Clondavaddog	Millford
Kingarrow	1,752	Boylagh	Inishkeel	Glenties
Kinkeel Island	10	Tirhugh	Kilbarron	Glenties
Kinletter	828	Raphoe	Donaghmore	Stranorlar
Kinletteragh	527	Kilmacrenan	Killygarvan	Millford
Kinnacally	323	Raphoe	Taughboyne	Strabane
Kinnaderry	390	Raphoe	Kilteevoge	Stranorlar
Kinnagoe	497	Inishowen West	Fahan Lower	Inishowen
Kinnakillew	647	Banagh	Glencolumbkille	Glenties
Kinnalargy	115	Kilmacrenan	Mevagh	Millford
Kinnalough	331	Kilmacrenan	Clondavaddog	Millford
Kinnea	564	Inishowen East	Clonmany	Inishowen
Kinnegar	32	Kilmacrenan	Killygarvan	Millford
Kinnoghty	205	Banagh	Inishkeel	Glenties
Kintale	76	Kilmacrenan	Killygarvan	Millford
Kirkneedy	896	Raphoe	Conwal	Letterkenny
Kirkstown	478	Kilmacrenan	Conwal	Letterkenny
Knader	788	Tirhugh	Kilbarron	Ballyshannon
Knock	164	Inishowen East	Culdaff	Inishowen
Knock	280	Raphoe	Donaghmore	Stranorlar
Knockagar	263	Banagh	Inver	Donegal
Knockagarran	331	Raphoe	Convoy	Stranorlar
Knockamany	306	Inishowen East	Clonca	Inishowen
Knockastoller	560	Kilmacrenan	Tullaghobegly	Dunfanaghy
Knockbane	125	Tirhugh	Drumhome	Donegal
Knockbrack	447	Raphoe	Leck	Letterkenny
Knockbrack	226	Kilmacrenan	Clondavaddog	Millford
Knockduff	54	Kilmacrenan	Clondahorky	Dunfanaghy
Knockergrana	161	Inishowen East	Clonca	Inishowen
Knockfair	154	Raphoe	Stranorlar	Stranorlar
Knockfola	1,167	Kilmacrenan	Tullaghobegly	Dunfanaghy
Knockglass	158	Inishowen East	Clonca	Inishowen
Knocknabollan	180	Kilmacrenan	Kilmacrenan	Millford
Knocknafaugher	666	Kilmacrenan	Clondahorky	Dunfanaghy
Knocknahorna	123	Banagh	Inver	Donegal
Knocknamona	106	Kilmacrenan	Conwal	Letterkenny
Knocknashangan	227	Tirhugh	Kilbarron	Ballyshannon
Knockrawer	46	Raphoe	Donaghmore	Strabane
Knockybrin	277	Kilmacrenan	Aghanunshin	Letterkenny
Labbadish	314	Raphoe	Raymoghy	Letterkenny
Labbadoo	216	Raphoe	Convoy	Stranorlar
Lackagh	1,094	Boylagh	Inishkeel	Glenties
Lackaghatermon	613	Boylagh	Inishkeel	Glenties
Lackaweer	158	Boylagh	Inishkeel	Glenties
Lackcrom	828	Banagh	Killymard	Donegal
Lacklea	611	Boylagh	Inishkeel	Glenties
Lacklom	256	Tirhugh	Drumhome	Ballyshannon
Lacknacoo	486	Kilmacrenan	Gartan	Letterkenny
Laconnell	592	Banagh	Inishkeel	Glenties
Lacroagh	583	Boylagh	Inishkeel	Glenties
Laddan	137	Kilmacrenan	Clondavaddog	Millford
Lag	349	Inishowen East	Clonca	Inishowen
Lagacurry	432	Inishowen East	Clonmany	Inishowen
Laghil	147	Banagh	Glencolumbkille	Glenties
**Laghy**	Town	Tirhugh	Drumhome	Donegal
Laghy	175	Tirhugh	Drumhome	Donegal
Laghy Barr (or Ardbane)	357	Tirhugh	Drumhome	Donegal
Lagnagillew	645	Boylagh	Inishkeel	Glenties
Lagunna	837	Banagh	Inishkeel	Glenties
Lahan Island	33	Boylagh	Templecrone	Glenties
Laheen	356	Tirhugh	Kilbarron	Ballyshannon
Lanehead	9	Kilmacrenan	Aghanunshin	Letterkenny
Laraghirril	364	Inishowen East	Clonca	Inishowen
Larganreagh	115	Kilmacrenan	Mevagh	Millford
Larganreagh Barr (or Meenacross)	63	Kilmacrenan	Mevagh	Millford
Largatreany	658	Kilmacrenan	Clondahorky	Dunfanaghy
Largnalarkan	612	Boylagh	Inishkeel	Glenties
Largybrack	1,043	Banagh	Inishkeel	Glenties
Largymore	252	Banagh	Kilcar	Glenties
Largynagreana	101	Banagh	Killybegs Upper	Glenties
Largysillagh	1,219	Banagh	Killybegs Upper	Glenties
Larnalore	449	Raphoe	Kilteevoge	Stranorlar
Leabgarrow	345	Boylagh	Templecrone	Glenties
Leabrannagh	63	Boylagh	Templcrone	Glenties
Leabrannagh Mtn. No. & Plughoge	113	Boylagh	Templcrone	Glenties
Leabrannagh Mtn. So. & Plughoge	195	Boylagh	Templcrone	Glenties
Leagans	194	Banagh	Inver	Donegal
Leaght	588	Raphoe	Donaghmore	Stranorlar
Leamacrossan	820	Inishowen East	Moville Upper	Inishowen
Leamagowra	1,233	Banagh	Inishkeel	Glenties
Leat Beg	641	Kilmacrenan	Clondavaddog	Millford
Leat More	188	Kilmacrenan	Clondavaddog	Millford
Leckbeg	63	Boylagh	Templecrone	Glenties
Leckemy (or Carrowblagh)	935	Inishowen East	Moville Lower	Inishowen
Leckenagh	511	Boylagh	Templecrone	Glenties
Lederg	1,180	Inishowen West	Desertegny	Inishowen
Lefinn	185	Boylagh	Templecrone	Glenties
Legacurry	100	Tirhugh	Drumhome	Donegal
Legaloscran	62	Tirhugh	Kilbarron	Ballyshannon
Legaltan	254	Tirhugh	Kilbarron	Ballyshannon
Legboy	86	Kilmacrenan	Clondavaddog	Millford
Leggandorragh	43	Raphoe	Clonleigh	Strabane
Leghawny	643	Tirhugh	Donegal	Donegal
Legland	506	Kilmacrenan	Killygarvan	Millford
Legland	313	Raphoe	Convoy	Stranorlar
Legmuckduff	137	Kilmacrenan	Tullyfern	Millford
Legnabraid (or Cunninghamstown)	100	Raphoe	Clonleigh	Strabane
Legnaduff	54	Raphoe	Killea	Londonderry
Legnahoory	727	Kilmacrenan	Kilmacrenan	Letterkenny
Legnaneale	80	Raphoe	Clonleigh	Strabane
Legnanornoge	225	Tirhugh	Drumhome	Donegal
Legnatraw	466	Raphoe	Taughboyne	Strabane
Legnawley Glebe	117	Banagh	Inver	Donegal
Lehardan	169	Kilmacrenan	Killygarvan	Millford
Leitrim	806	Inishowen East	Culdaff	Inishowen
Leitrim	293	Raphoe	Allsaints	Londonderry
Lenalea	385	Raphoe	Conwal	Letterkenny
Lenan	1,583	Inishowen East	Clonmany	Inishowen
Lenynarnan and Aghilly	377	Inishowen West	Fahan Lower	Inishowen
Lergadaghtan	112	Banagh	Glencolumbkille	Glenties
Lergadaghtan	94	Banagh	Kilcar	Glenties
Lergadaghtan Mountain	209	Banagh	Glencolumbkille	Glenties
Lerginacarha	342	Banagh	Inishkeel	Glenties
Lergynasearhagh	621	Banagh	Inishkeel	Glenties
Letter	191	Banagh	Kilcar	Glenties
Letter	63	Banagh	Killybegs Upper	Glenties
Letter	851	Inishowen East	Clonmany	Inishowen
Letter	625	Inishowen West	Fahan Upper	Londonderry
Letter	453	Kilmacrenan	Kilmacrenan	Millford
Letterbarra	212	Banagh	Inver	Donegal
Letterbrick	1,070	Raphoe	Kilteevoge	Stranorlar
Lettercran	526	Tirhugh	Templecarn	Donegal
Lettereau	343	Boylagh	Templecrone	Glenties
Letterfad	1,520	Banagh	Inver	Donegal
Letterfad	277	Kilmacrenan	Kilmacrenan	Millford
Lettergull	557	Raphoe	Taughboyne	Strabane
Letterilly	1,904	Boylagh	Inishkeel	Glenties
**Letterkenny**	Town	Kilmacrenan	Conwal	Letterkenny
Letterkenny	410	Kilmacrenan	Conwal	Letterkenny
Letterleague	599	Raphoe	Conwal	Letterkenny
Lettermakenny	427	Raphoe	Stranorlar	Stranorlar
Lettermore	578	Banagh	Inver	Donegal
Lettermore	604	Raphoe	Convoy	Stranorlar
Letternacahy	159	Banagh	Inver	Donegal
Lettershanbo	575	Raphoe	Convoy	Stranorlar
Lettershanbo	1,300	Raphoe	Kilteevoge	Stranorlar
Lettertreane	569	Banagh	Inver	Donegal
Liafin	489	Inishowen West	Desertegny	Inishowen
**Lifford**	Town	Raphoe	Clonleigh	Strabane
Lifford	148	Raphoe	Clonleigh	Strabane
Lifford Beg	54	Raphoe	Clonleigh	Strabane
Lifford Common	360	Raphoe	Clonleigh	Strabane
Lighthouse Lot	82	Boylagh	Templecrone	Glenties
Linsfort	331	Inishowen West	Desertegny	Inishowen
Lisavaddy	164	Banagh	Killaghtee	Donegal
Lisclamerty	417	Raphoe	Raymoghy	Letterkenny
Liscooly	127	Raphoe	Donaghmore	Stranorlar
Lisfannan	487	Inishowen West	Burt	Londonderry
Lisfannan	553	Inishowen West	Fahan Upper	Londonderry
Liskeeraghan	324	Banagh	Inishkeel	Glenties
Liskeran	722	Raphoe	Stranorlar	Stranorlar
Liskey	139	Raphoe	Clonleigh	Strabane
Lismintan (or Ballyruddelly)	377	Tirhugh	Drumhome	Donegal
Lismoghry	352	Raphoe	Raymoghy	Strabane
Lismonaghan	155	Raphoe	Leck	Letterkenny
Lismontigley	178	Raphoe	Raphoe	Strabane
Lismullyduff	778	Raphoe	Donaghmore	Stranorlar
Lisnabert	130	Raphoe	Donaghmore	Strabane
Lisnamulligan	260	Raphoe	Donaghmore	Strabane
Lisnanees Lower	129	Kilmacrenan	Aghanunshin	Letterkenny
Lisnanees Upper	192	Kilmacrenan	Aghanunshin	Letterkenny
Lisnapaste	569	Tirhugh	Drumhome	Donegal
Lisnaree	26	Raphoe	Convoy	Stranorlar
Lisnaree	68	Raphoe	Stranorlar	Stranorlar
Lisnenan	232	Kilmacrenan	Conwal	Letterkenny
Lisnoble	22	Raphoe	Raphoe	Strabane
Lissacholly	612	Tirhugh	Kilbarron	Ballyshannon
Lissinisk	53	Raphoe	Convoy	Stranorlar
Lissinore	78	Raphoe	Convoy	Stranorlar
Listack	497	Raphoe	Conwal	Letterkenny
Listannagh	99	Raphoe	Taughboyne	Strabane
Listellian	651	Raphoe	Leck	Letterkenny
Listicall Lower	187	Raphoe	Taughboyne	Londonderry
Listicall Upper	302	Raphoe	Taughboyne	Londonderry
Little Island	1	Kilmacrenan	Clondahorky	Dunfanaghy
Longfield	112	Banagh	Inishkeel	Glenties
Longfield	60	Boylagh	Lettermacaward	Glenties
Longhill	70	Kilmacrenan	Tullyfern	Millford
Losset	1,291	Kilmacrenan	Gartan	Letterkenny
Lough Hill	57	Raphoe	Stranorlar	Stranorlar
Lough Hill (or Drumalough)	166	Banagh	Inishkeel	Glenties
Loughagannon	358	Kilmacrenan	Aghanunshin	Letterkenny
Loughagher	1,510	Boylagh	Templecrone	Glenties
Loughanure	941	Boylagh	Templecrone	Glenties
Loughaskerry	261	Kilmacrenan	Kilmacrenan	Millford
Loughbarra (or Croagheen)	2,020	Kilmacrenan	Gartan	Letterkenny
Loughcrillan	508	Boylagh	Inishkeel	Glenties
Loughcuill	408	Tirhugh	Donegal	Donegal
Loughderryduff	600	Boylagh	Inishkeel	Glenties
Loughdoo	83	Kilmacrenan	Tullyfern	Millford
Lougheask Demesne	258	Banagh	Killymard	Donegal
Lougheraherk	355	Banagh	Glencolumbkille	Glenties
Lougherbraghy	595	Inishowen East	Clonca	Inishowen
Lougherrig	804	Boylagh	Inishkeel	Glenties
Loughfad	673	Tirhugh	Templecarn	Donegal
Loughfad	905	Boylagh	Inishkeel	Glenties
Loughkip	112	Tirhugh	Donegal	Donegal
Loughlin Island	1	Kilmacrenan	Tullaghobegly	Dunfanaghy
Loughmuck	295	Boylagh	Inishkeel	Glenties
Loughmuilt	467	Banagh	Killaghtee	Donegal
Loughnagin	278	Kilmacrenan	Aghanunshin	Letterkenny
Loughnakey	108	Kilmacrenan	Tullyfern	Millford
Loughnalughraman	243	Banagh	Inishkeel	Glenties
Loughnambraddan	362	Boylagh	Inishkeel	Glenties
Loughros Glebe	200	Kilmacrenan	Tullyfern	Millford
Loughsallagh	910	Raphoe	Kilteevoge	Stranorlar
Loughsalt	141	Boylagh	Templecrone	Glenties
Loughultan	795	Tirhugh	Templecarn	Donegal
Lower Barr and Carrick Upper	1,142	Tirhugh	Drumhome	Donegal
Luaghnabrogue	1,020	Banagh	Inver	Donegal
Luddan	519	Inishowen West	Fahan Lower	Inishowen
Lugher	65	Kilmacrenan	Killygarvan	Millford
Lughveen	826	Boylagh	Inishkeel	Glenties
Lunniagh	507	Kilmacrenan	Tullaghobegly	Dunfanaghy
Lurgabrack	709	Kilmacrenan	Clondahorky	Dunfanaghy
Lurgacloghan	246	Kilmacrenan	Clondavaddog	Millford
Lurgan	484	Tirhugh	Drumhome	Ballyshannon
Lurganboy	86	Tirhugh	Donegal	Donegal
Lurganboy	71	Banagh	Killybegs Lower	Glenties
Lurganboy	82	Kilmacrenan	Clondavaddog	Millford
Lurganboy	576	Kilmacrenan	Killygarvan	Millford
Lurganbrack	295	Kilmacrenan	Clondavaddog	Millford
Lurganshannagh	137	Raphoe	Clonleigh	Strabane
Lurgy	278	Raphoe	Leck	Letterkenny
Lurgybrack	81	Raphoe	Leck	Letterkenny
Maas	643	Boylagh	Inishkeel	Glenties
Macmeenstown	149	Raphoe	Convoy	Stranorlar
Madavagh	296	Boylagh	Lettermacaward	Glenties
Magheestown	233	Raphoe	Raphoe	Strabane
Maghera	1,806	Banagh	Inishkeel	Glenties
Maghera Beg	269	Raphoe	Raymoghy	Letterkenny
Maghera More	70	Raphoe	Raymoghy	Letterkenny
Magherabeg	295	Inishowen West	Fahan Upper	Londonderry
Magherabeg	328	Kilmacrenan	Mevagh	Millford
Magherablad	201	Kilmacrenan	Clondahorky	Dunfanaghy
Magheraboy	319	Raphoe	Leck	Letterkenny
Magheraboy	21	Raphoe	Killea	Londonderry
Magheraboy	38	Raphoe	Raphoe	Strabane
Magheraboy	321	Raphoe	Donaghmore	Stranorlar
Magheraboy Glebe	34	Raphoe	Killea	Londonderry
Magheracar	918	Tirhugh	Inishmacsaint	Ballyshannon
Magheraclogher	563	Kilmacrenan	Tullaghobegly	Dunfanaghy
Magheracloigh	319	Raphoe	Kilteevoge	Stranorlar
Magheracloy	103	Raphoe	Taughboyne	Strabane
Magheracorran	547	Raphoe	Convoy	Stranorlar
Magheradrumman	1,916	Inishowen East	Donagh	Inishowen
Magheradrumman	324	Kilmacrenan	Clondavaddog	Millford
Magheradrumman	270	Kilmacrenan	Tullyfern	Millford
Magheragallan	412	Kilmacrenan	Tullaghobegly	Dunfanaghy
Magherahaan	282	Raphoe	Raphoe	Strabane
Magherahee	384	Raphoe	Raphoe	Strabane
Magheralahan	140	Inishowen East	Moville Upper	Inishowen
Magheramagorgan	380	Kilmacrenan	Mevagh	Millford
Magheramenagh	278	Kilmacrenan	Clondahorky	Dunfanaghy
Magheramore	580	Boylagh	Inishkeel	Glenties
Magheran	532	Kilmacrenan	Conwal	Letterkenny
Magheranakilly	84	Kilmacrenan	Killygarvan	Millford
Magheranan	77	Kilmacrenan	Aghanunshin	Letterkenny
Magheranappan	425	Raphoe	Convoy	Stranorlar
Magheranaul	233	Inishowen East	Clonmany	Inishowen
Magherapaste	50	Raphoe	Stranorlar	Stranorlar
Magherareagh	217	Raphoe	Donaghmore	Strabane
Magheraroarty	221	Kilmacrenan	Clondahorky	Dunfanaghy
Magheraroarty	908	Kilmacrenan	Tullaghobegly	Dunfanaghy
Magheraroarty Mountain	1,389	Kilmacrenan	Tullaghobegly	Dunfanaghy
Magherashanvally	271	Raphoe	Donaghmore	Strabane
Magherasollus	364	Raphoe	Raphoe	Strabane
Magheravall (or Midcut)	268	Raphoe	Convoy	Stranorlar
Magherawarden	675	Kilmacrenan	Clondavaddog	Millford
Maghernagran	136	Kilmacrenan	Conwal	Letterkenny
Maghernalaght	98	Kilmacrenan	Clondavaddog	Millford
Maghernashangan	814	Kilmacrenan	Gartan	Letterkenny
Maghery Glebe	511	Boylagh	Templecrone	Glenties
Magheryard	413	Inishowen East	Clonca	Inishowen
Magherycallaghan	144	Raphoe	Urney	Strabane
**Malin**	Town	Inishowen East	Clonea	Inishowen
Malin Beg	3,112	Banagh	Glencolumbkille	Glenties
Malin More	3,020	Banagh	Glencolumbkille	Glenties
**Manorcunningham**	Town	Raphoe	Raymoghy	Letterkenny
Manorcunningham	202	Raphoe	Raymoghy	Letterkenny
Manorcunningham Churchland	87	Raphoe	Raymoghy	Letterkenny
Manorcunningham Churchland Isle	43	Raphoe	Raymoghy	Letterkenny
Marble Hill	105	Kilmacrenan	Clondahorky	Dunfanaghy
Marfagh	109	Kilmacrenan	Clondahorky	Dunfanaghy
Masiness	314	Kilmacrenan	Clondahorky	Dunfanaghy
Mass Bet	126	Raphoe	Clonleigh	Strabane
Mass More	123	Raphoe	Clonleigh	Strabane
Masshill	91	Raphoe	Clonleigh	Strabane
Massreagh	249	Kilmacrenan	Kilmacrenan	Millford
Maylin	63	Raphoe	Raymoghy	Londonderry
Meedanmore	341	Inishowen East	Clonca	Inishowen
Meenabaltin	463	Inishowen East	Moville Upper	Inishowen
Meenaboll	197	Banagh	Inishkeel	Glenties
Meenaboll	492	Kilmacrenan	Conwal	Letterkenny
Meenabollagan	914	Boylagh	Templecrone	Glenties
Meenabrock	918	Tirhugh	Donegal	Donegal
Meenabrock	447	Banagh	Killaghtee	Donegal
Meenabrock	736	Boylagh	Inishkeel	Glenties
Meenacahan	486	Banagh	Inver	Donegal
Meenacally	175	Banagh	Killymard	Donegal
Meenacargagh (or Raneany Barr)	991	Tirhugh	Drumhome	Donegal
Meenacarn	389	Boylagh	Lettermacaward	Glenties
Meenachallow	701	Boylagh	Killybegs Lower	Glenties
Meenacharbet	82	Banagh	Inver	Donegal
Meenacharvey	1,289	Banagh	Glencolumbkille	Glenties
Meenachuit	370	Boylagh	Inishkeel	Glenties
Meenachullalan	252	Banagh	Killybegs Upper	Glenties
Meenachullion	2,348	Boylagh	Inishkeel	Glenties
Meenaclady	1,955	Kilmacrenan	Tullaghobegly	Dunfanaghy
Meenacloghcor	152	Boylagh	Templecrone	Glenties
Meenacloghspar	286	Banagh	Inver	Donegal
Meenacloy	300	Banagh	Killaghtee	Donegal
Meenacross	330	Banagh	Glencolumbkille	Glenties
Meenacross	254	Boylagh	Templecrone	Glenties
Meenacross (or Larganreagh Barr)	63	Kilmacrenan	Mevagh	Millford
Meenacung	1,170	Kilmacrenan	Tullaghobegly	Dunfanaghy
Meenacung	593	Kilmacrenan	Conwal	Letterkenny
Meenacurrin	226	Banagh	Inver	Donegal
Meenacurrin	1,795	Banagh	Inishkeel	Glenties
Meenadaura (or Drumnahough Mountain)	491	Raphoe	Conwal	Stranorlar
Meenadiff	386	Banagh	Glencolumbkille	Glenties
Meenadiff	420	Inishowen West	Mintiaghs or Barr of Inch	Inishowen
Meenadoan	998	Boylagh	Inishkeel	Glenties
Meenadreen	805	Tirhugh	Donegal	Donegal
Meenadreen	309	Banagh	Killaghtee	Donegal
Meenadreen	197	Banagh	Glencolumbkille	Glenties
Meenaduff	298	Kilmacrenan	Tullaghobegly	Dunfanaghy
Meenagannive	484	Kilmacrenan	Gartan	Letterkenny
Meenagolan	183	Banagh	Killaghtee	Donegal
Meenagolan	809	Banagh	Inishkeel	Glenties
Meenagolan	625	Boylagh	Inishkeel	Glenties
Meenagolan	1,147	Raphoe	Donaghmore	Stranorlar
Meenagoppoge	569	Kilmacrenan	Tullaghobegly	Dunfanaghy
Meenagory	736	Inishowen West	Fahan Lower	Inishowen
Meenagowan	195	Boylagh	Lettermacaward	Glenties
Meenagowna	69	Boylagh	Templecrone	Glenties
Meenagranoge	737	Banagh	Inver	Donegal
Meenagrau	944	Banagh	Inver	Donegal
Meenagrauv	614	Raphoe	Kilteevoge	Stranorlar
Meenagrauv	346	Raphoe	Stranorlar	Stranorlar
Meenagrillagh	742	Boylagh	Inishkeel	Glenties
Meenagrubby	348	Boylagh	Inishkeel	Glenties
Meenaguse Beg	302	Banagh	Inver	Donegal
Meenaguse More	737	Banagh	Killymard	Donegal
Meenahinnis	247	Raphoe	Donaghmore	Stranorlar
Meenahoney	183	Raphoe	Donaghmore	Stranorlar
Meenahorna	963	Raphoe	Kilteevoge	Stranorlar
Meenakillew	548	Banagh	Inishkeel	Glenties
Meenakilwirra	442	Boylagh	Killybegs Lower	Glenties
Meenalaban	563	Raphoe	Convoy	Stranorlar
Meenalargan	434	Boylagh	Inishkeel	Glenties
Meenaleavin	588	Inishowen East	Moville Upper	Inishowen
Meenalecky	498	Boylagh	Templecrone	Glenties
Meenaleenaghan	495	Boylagh	Inishkeel	Glenties
Meenalig	466	Raphoe	Kilteevoge	Stranorlar
Meenalooban	130	Inishowen West	Desertegny	Inishowen
Meenamanragh	622	Boylagh	Inishkeel	Glenties
Meenamullaghan	323	Inishowen West	Fahan Lower	Inishowen
Meenanall	307	Boylagh	Inishkeel	Glenties
Meenanamph	510	Raphoe	Kilteevoge	Stranorlar
Meenanarwa	550	Boylagh	Inishkeel	Glenties
Meenanellison	2,188	Tirhugh	Templecarn	Donegal
Meenanery	823	Banagh	Glencolumbkille	Glenties
Meenanillar	564	Kilmacrenan	Tullaghobegly	Dunfanaghy
Meenanilta	257	Raphoe	Stranorlar	Stranorlar
Meenapeaky	302	Banagh	Inishkeel	Glenties
Meenaroshin	444	Banagh	Killybegs Upper	Glenties
Meenasillagh	653	Banagh	Glencolumbkille	Glenties
Meenasrone North	498	Boylagh	Inishkeel	Glenties
Meenasrone South	308	Boylagh	Inishkeel	Glenties
Meenataggart	172	Banagh	Killymard	Donegal
Meenatawy	458	Boylagh	Inishkeel	Glenties
Meenateia	367	Banagh	Inishkeel	Glenties
Meenatinny	1,503	Kilmacrenan	Conwal	Letterkenny
Meenatole	199	Kilmacrenan	Conwal	Millford
Meenavaghran	757	Banagh	Glencolumbkille	Glenties
Meenavale	420	Boylagh	Inishkeel	Glenties
Meenavally	684	Banagh	Inishkeel	Glenties
Meenavally	149	Raphoe	Convoy	Stranorlar
Meenavanaghan	352	Inishowen East	Moville Upper	Inishowen
Meenavanaghan (or Greaghs Barr)	232	Tirhugh	Drumhome	Donegal
Meenavean	440	Banagh	Glencolumbkille	Glenties
Meenavoy	537	Raphoe	Stranorlar	Stranorlar
Meenawannia	270	Boylagh	Killybegs Lower	Glenties
Meenawilderg	159	Banagh	Killymard	Donegal
Meenawilligan	221	Kilmacrenan	Gartan	Letterkenny
Meenawley	137	Banagh	Killybegs Upper	Glenties
Meenawullaghan	368	Banagh	Inver	Donegal
Meenbane	804	Raphoe	Stranorlar	Stranorlar
Meenbannad	1,607	Boylagh	Templecrone	Glenties
Meenbog	4,444	Raphoe	Donaghmore	Stranorlar
Meenbog	442	Raphoe	Kilteevoge	Stranorlar
Meenboy	199	Banagh	Kilcar	Glenties
Meenbunone	571	Kilmacrenan	Kilmacrenan	Millford
Meencargagh	358	Kilmacrenan	Conwal	Stranorlar
Meencargagh	764	Raphoe	Stranorlar	Stranorlar
Meencoolasheskin	186	Kilmacrenan	Raymunterdoney	Dunfanaghy
Meencorwick	1,013	Kilmacrenan	Tullaghobegly	Dunfanaghy
Meencrumlin	620	Raphoe	Stranorlar	Stranorlar
Meendacalliagh	1,435	Inishowen West	Fahan Lower	Inishowen
Meenderrygamph	1,300	Kilmacrenan	Tullaghobegly	Dunfanaghy
Meenderryherk Glebe	900	Boylagh	Templecrone	Glenties
Meenderrynasloe	1,005	Boylagh	Templecrone	Glenties
Meenderryowan	507	Boylagh	Templecrone	Glenties
Meendoran	1,050	Inishowen East	Clonmany	Inishowen
Meendrain	482	Boylagh	Templecrone	Glenties
Meenformal	766	Kilmacrenan	Mevagh	Millford
Meengilcarry	337	Banagh	Inishkeel	Glenties
Meengilcarry	450	Raphoe	Kilteevoge	Stranorlar
Meenirroy	543	Kilmacrenan	Conwal	Letterkenny
Meenkeeragh	812	Inishowen West	Fahan Lower	Inishowen
Meenlargh	381	Kilmacrenan	Tullaghobegly	Dunfanaghy
Meenlargh	412	Kilmacrenan	Mevagh	Millford
Meenlecknalore	840	Boylagh	Templecrone	Glenties
Meenletterbale	1,259	Inishowen East	Moville Lower	Inishowen
Meenlougher	328	Raphoe	Donaghmore	Strabane
Meenmalragh	593	Boylagh	Inishkeel	Glenties
Meenmore	1,548	Boylagh	Templecrone	Glenties
Meenmore East	1,125	Boylagh	Inishkeel	Glenties
Meenmore West	1,260	Boylagh	Inishkeel	Glenties
Meenreagh	876	Banagh	Killybegs Upper	Glenties
Meenreagh	176	Kilmacrenan	Killygarvan	Millford
Meenreagh	439	Kilmacrenan	Kilmacrenan	Millford
Meenreagh	1,738	Raphoe	Donaghmore	Stranorlar
Meensheefin	2,992	Tirhugh	Templecarn	Donegal
Meentacor	299	Banagh	Inver	Donegal
Meentacreeghan	408	Banagh	Inver	Donegal
Meentadun	202	Banagh	Killybegs Upper	Glenties
Meentagh	274	Kilmacrenan	Clondavaddog	Millford
Meentaghconlan	252	Kilmacrenan	Clondavaddog	Millford
Meentaghmore	269	Kilmacrenan	Clondavaddog	Millford
Meentakeeraghan	92	Banagh	Kilcar	Glenties
Meentanadea	217	Banagh	Killybegs Lower	Glenties
Meentanakill	296	Banagh	Inver	Donegal
Meentashesk	338	Banagh	Inishkeel	Glenties
Meentullynagarn	366	Banagh	Killaghtee	Glenties
Meentycat	1,577	Raphoe	Convoy	Stranorlar
Meentygrannagh	839	Kilmacrenan	Conwal	Stranorlar
Meentymorgal	469	Boylagh	Inishkeel	Glenties
Meenyanly	642	Inishowen West	Muff	Londonderry
Meenybraddan	668	Banagh	Inver	Donegal
Meenychanon	471	Banagh	Kilcar	Glenties
Meenyhooghan	180	Banagh	Killybegs Upper	Glenties
Mellamore	18	Boylagh	Templecrone	Glenties
Melmore	374	Kilmacrenan	Mevagh	Millford
Menamny	127	Banagh	Killaghtee	Donegal
Mevagh	155	Kilmacrenan	Mevagh	Millford
Midcut (or Magheravall)	268	Raphoe	Convoy	Stranorlar
Middletown	166	Boylagh	Inishkeel	Glenties
Milk Isle	25	Kilmacrenan	Conwal	Letterkenny
Millbrook	41	Kilmacrenan	Killygarvan	Millford
Millfarm	28	Raphoe	Urney	Strabane
**Millford**	Town	Kilmacrenan	Tullyfern	Millford
Millford	203	Kilmacrenan	Tullyfern	Millford
Millsessiagh	54	Raphoe	Clonleigh	Strabane
Milltown	98	Tirhugh	Donegal	Donegal
Milltown	46	Banagh	Killymard	Donegal
Milltown	311	Raphoe	Conwal	Letterkenny
Milltown	54	Kilmacrenan	Gartan	Letterkenny
Milltown	93	Raphoe	Raymoghy	Londonderry
Milltown	38	Raphoe	Raphoe	Strabane
Milltown	50	Raphoe	Convoy	Stranorlar
Mogumna	201	Banagh	Killybegs Lower	Glenties
Mogumna Mountain	108	Banagh	Killybegs Lower	Glenties
Momeen	509	Raphoe	Taughboyne	Strabane
Monargan Glebe	361	Banagh	Killybegs Lower	Glenties
Monclink	237	Raphoe	Raymoghy	Letterkenny
Mondooey Lower	154	Raphoe	Raymoghy	Letterkenny
Mondooey Middle	333	Raphoe	Raymoghy	Letterkenny
Mondooey Upper	482	Raphoe	Raymoghy	Letterkenny
Moneen	138	Raphoe	Clonleigh	Strabane
Monellan	381	Raphoe	Donaghmore	Stranorlar
Moness	369	Inishowen West	Burt	Londonderry
Moness	125	Raphoe	Taughboyne	Strabane
Money Beg	466	Kilmacrenan	Tullaghobegly	Dunfanaghy
Money More	492	Kilmacrenan	Tullaghobegly	Dunfanaghy
Moneydarragh	2,596	Inishowen East	Culdaff	Inishowen
Moneygreggan	237	Raphoe	Allsaints	Londonderry
Moneyhaughly	236	Raphoe	Raymoghy	Letterkenny
Moneymore	127	Tirhugh	Drumhome	Ballyshannon
Moneymore	395	Raphoe	Raymoghy	Londonderry
Monfad	238	Raphoe	Allsaints	Londonderry
Mongavlin	125	Raphoe	Taughboyne	Strabane
Monglass	345	Raphoe	Allsaints	Londonderry
Mongorry	530	Raphoe	Raphoe	Letterkenny
Monreagh	272	Raphoe	Taughboyne	Londonderry
Monreagh (or Barr of Kilmackilvenny)	930	Inishowen West	Fahan Upper	Londonderry
Montgomery's Fort (or Calhame)	146	Raphoe	Convoy	Stranorlar
Montymeane	622	Boylagh	Inishkeel	Glenties
Mooneennahasragh	378	Raphoe	Kilteevoge	Stranorlar
Moress	316	Inishowen West	Inch	Londonderry
Moross	309	Kilmacrenan	Clondavaddog	Millford
Mossfield	47	Kilmacrenan	Gartan	Letterkenny
Mossy Glen	793	Inishowen East	Moville Lower	Inishowen
Mountainpark	176	Raphoe	Raphoe	Strabane
Mountainpark	106	Raphoe	Donaghmore	Stranorlar
**Mountcharles**	Town	Banagh	Inver	Donegal
Mountcharles	650	Banagh	Inver	Donegal
Mounthall	591	Raphoe	Donaghmore	Stranorlar
Mountpleasure	82	Kilmacrenan	Gartan	Letterkenny
**Moville**	Town	Inishowen East	Moville Lower	Inishowen
Moy	84	Banagh	Killybegs Lower	Glenties
Moyagh	304	Kilmacrenan	Tullyfern	Millford
Moyle	214	Raphoe	Allsaints	Londonderry
Moyle	333	Kilmacrenan	Tullyfern	Millford
Moylehill	156	Kilmacrenan	Tullyfern	Millford
Moylemoss	115	Raphoe	Allsaints	Londonderry
Moymore	115	Raphoe	Taughboyne	Strabane
Moyne	276	Tirhugh	Drumhome	Donegal
Moyra Glebe	1,709	Kilmacrenan	Raymunterdoney	Dunfanaghy
Muckros	62	Tirhugh	Donegal	Donegal
Muckros	213	Banagh	Kilcar	Glenties
**Muff**	Town	Inishowen West	Muff	Londonderry
Muff	470	Inishowen East	Culdaff	Inishowen
Muff	588	Inishowen West	Muff	Londonderry
Muineagh	244	Inishowen West	Desertegny	Inishowen
Muineagh	253	Kilmacrenan	Clondavaddog	Millford
Mullafin	175	Raphoe	Raphoe	Letterkenny
Mullaghagarry	256	Raphoe	Stranorlar	Stranorlar
Mullaghaneary	293	Raphoe	Donaghmore	Stranorlar
Mullaghanny	247	Raphoe	Clonleigh	Strabane
Mullaghderg	539	Boylagh	Templecrone	Glenties
Mullaghderg Mtn.Pasture	847	Boylagh	Templecrone	Glenties
Mullaghdoo Irish	91	Boylagh	Templecrone	Glenties
Mullaghdoo Scotch	304	Boylagh	Templecrone	Glenties
Mullagheep	142	Kilmacrenan	Tullyfern	Millford
Mullaghfin	218	Raphoe	Convoy	Stranorlar
Mullanacarry	53	Banagh	Inishkeel	Glenties
Mullanachose	153	Raphoe	Stranorlar	Stranorlar
Mullanacloy	120	Banagh	Killybegs Lower	Glenties
Mullanacross	259	Tirhugh	Drumhome	Ballyshannon
Mullanalamphry	186	Tirhugh	Donegal	Donegal
Mullanard	212	Raphoe	Convoy	Stranorlar
Mullanasole	181	Tirhugh	Drumhome	Donegal
Mullanasole Barr	299	Tirhugh	Drumhome	Donegal
Mullanboy	57	Raphoe	Donaghmore	Strabane
Mullanboy	60	Raphoe	Urney	Strabane
Mullanboys	248	Banagh	Inver	Donegal
Mullandrait	194	Raphoe	Stranorlar	Stranorlar
Mullangore	207	Kilmacrenan	Gartan	Letterkenny
Mullanmore	247	Boylagh	Inishkeel	Glenties
Mullans	302	Tirhugh	Kilbarron	Ballyshannon
Mullans	41	Tirhugh	Drumhome	Donegal
Mullans	134	Banagh	Killymard	Donegal
Mullantiboyle	98	Boylagh	Killybegs Lower	Glenties
Mulleny	434	Inishowen West	Burt	Londonderry
Mullingar	91	Raphoe	Donaghmore	Stranorlar
Mully	458	Boylagh	Inishkeel	Glenties
Mullyvea	495	Boylagh	Inishkeel	Glenties
Mulmosog (or Altnagapple)	766	Banagh	Inishkeel	Glenties
Mulnagoad	91	Tirhugh	Templecarn	Donegal
Mulnagung	277	Raphoe	Clonleigh	Strabane
Mulnamin Beg	379	Boylagh	Inishkeel	Glenties
Mulnamin More	237	Boylagh	Inishkeel	Glenties
Mulnaveagh	313	Raphoe	Clonleigh	Strabane
Multins	468	Banagh	Killaghtee	Donegal
Muntermellan	1,122	Kilmacrenan	Clondahorky	Dunfanaghy
Munterneese	315	Banagh	Inver	Donegal
Muntertinny	382	Raphoe	Raphoe	Strabane
Murlough	70	Raphoe	Allsaints	Londonderry
Murlough	185	Raphoe	Clonleigh	Strabane
Murren	388	Kilmacrenan	Clondavaddog	Millford
Murroe	1,300	Kilmacrenan	Clondahorky	Dunfanaghy
Murvagh Lower	549	Tirhugh	Drumhome	Donegal
Murvagh Upper Glebe	291	Tirhugh	Drumhome	Donegal
Naran	495	Boylagh	Inishkeel	Glenties
Navenny.	340	Raphoe	Donaghmore	Stranorlar
Nethertown	113	Raphoe	Taughboyne	Strabane
Newchurch Glebe	2	Banagh	Kilcar	Glenties
Newmill	289	Kilmacrenan	Aughnish	Millford
Newrow	122	Raphoe	Clonleigh	Strabane
Newrow	47	Raphoe	Raphoe	Strabane
Newtown Carradoan	101	Kilmacrenan	Killygarvan	Millford
**Newtown Cunningham**	Town	Raphoe	Allsaints	Londonderry
Newtown Springfield	122	Kilmacrenan	Clondavaddog	Millford
Newtownburke	128	Banagh	Inishkeel	Glenties
Newtowncunningham	247	Raphoe	Allsaints	Londonderry
Newtowndrumgornan	339	Banagh	Killymard	Donegal
Newtownfore	117	Kilmacrenan	Aughnish	Letterkenny
Newtowngrove (or Grovehall)	196	Kilmacrenan	Kilmacrenan	Millford
Newtownhamilton	52	Raphoe	Killea	Londonderry
Norrira	489	Inishowen East	Clonca	Inishowen
Oakfield Demesne	231	Raphoe	Raphoe	Strabane
O'Donnell's Island	1	Tirhugh	Donegal	Donegal
Ogherbeg	690	Banagh	Killymard	Donegal
Oghill	263	Kilmacrenan	Tullyfern	Millford
Old Church Glebe	1	Banagh	Kilcar	Glenties
Oldtown	100	Raphoe	Leck	Letterkenny
Oort	754	Inishowen East	Culdaff	Inishowen
Orinish Island	4	Boylagh	Inishkeel	Glenties
Oughtcarn	1,051	Tirhugh	Templecarn	Donegal
Oughterlin	777	Kilmacrenan	Killygarvan	Millford
Oughtmeen	1,139	Boylagh	Templecrone	Glenties
Oughtnadrin	145	Tirhugh	Drumhome	Donegal
Oughtnadrin Barr	1,434	Tirhugh	Drumhome	Donegal
Oughtnadrin Barr (or Tullygallen and Tullywee)	1,434	Tirhugh	Drumhome	Donegal
Owenboy	288	Banagh	Killymard	Donegal
Owenboy	2,021	Inishowen West	Fahan Lower	Inishowen
Owenkillew & Barnahone	584	Inishowen West	Fahan Lower	Inishowen
Owennagadragh	460	Raphoe	Donaghmore	Stranorlar
Owenteskiny	1,353	Banagh	Inishkeel	Glenties
Owey Island	301	Boylagh	Templecrone	Glenties
Parkhill	204	Tirhugh	Kilbarron	Ballyshannon
Parkmore	132	Kilmacrenan	Clondahorky	Dunfanaghy
**Pettigoe**	Town	Tirhugh	Templecarn	Donegal
Pettigoe	72	Tirhugh	Templecarn	Donegal
Plaster	155	Raphoe	Allsaints	Londonderry
Plea Isle	59	Raphoe	Raymoghy	Letterkenny
Pluck	129	Raphoe	Leck	Letterkenny
Plughoge	52	Boylagh	Templecrone	Glenties
Plughoge (or Leabrannagh Mountain North)	113	Boylagh	Templecrone	Glenties
Plughoge (or Leabrannagh Mountain South)	195	Boylagh	Templecrone	Glenties
Point	231	Banagh	Inver	Donegal
Point	290	Banagh	Killaghtee	Donegal
Pollaguill	324	Kilmacrenan	Clondahorky	Dunfanaghy
Pollandoo	573	Kilmacrenan	Gartan	Letterkenny
Pollans	161	Kilmacrenan	Conwal	Letterkenny
Pollet	164	Kilmacrenan	Clondavaddog	Millford
Pollnaranny	1,348	Tirhugh	Drumhome	Donegal
**Port**	Town	Banagh	Inver	Donegal
Port	107	Banagh	Inver	Donegal
Port	527	Kilmacrenan	Clondahorky	Dunfanaghy
Port	300	Banagh	Glencolumbkille	Glenties
Portcreevy	333	Tirhugh	Templecarn	Donegal
Porthall	470	Raphoe	Clonleigh	Strabane
Portinure	85	Raphoe	Clonleigh	Strabane
Portleen	667	Kilmacrenan	Kilmacrenan	Millford
Portlough	282	Raphoe	Allsaints	Londonderry
Portnason	57	Tirhugh	Inishmacsaint	Ballyshannon
Prablin	34	Kilmacrenan	Aughnish	Millford
Prieststown	88	Raphoe	Convoy	Stranorlar
Procklis	1,733	Kilmacrenan	Tullaghobegly	Dunfanaghy
Procklis	429	Kilmacrenan	Conwal	Letterkenny
Procklis	179	Kilmacrenan	Kilmacrenan	Millford
Race End	99	Kilmacrenan	Conwal	Letterkenny
Rafoarty	94	Tirhugh	Drumhome	Donegal
Rafoarty	157	Banagh	Inver	Donegal
Raforker	93	Tirhugh	Donegal	Donegal
Rahan Far	157	Banagh	Killaghtee	Donegal
Rahan Near	213	Banagh	Killaghtee	Donegal
Rahanlacky	146	Banagh	Killaghtee	Donegal
Raheen	99	Tirhugh	Kilbarron	Ballyshannon
Raneany Barr (or Meenacargagh)	991	Tirhugh	Drumhome	Donegal
Raneany East	139	Tirhugh	Drumhome	Donegal
Raneany West	181	Tirhugh	Drumhome	Donegal
Raneely	218	Banagh	Inver	Donegal
Rann	517	Raphoe	Leck	Letterkenny
Rannagh and Toories	338	Boylagh	Templecrone	Glenties
Ranny	588	Boylagh	Lettermacaward	Glenties
Ranny	286	Kilmacrenan	Tullyfern	Millford
**Raphoe**	Town	Raphoe	Raphoe	Strabane
Raphoe Demesne	126	Raphoe	Raphoe	Strabane
Raphoe Townparks	306	Raphoe	Raphoe	Strabane
Rareagh	1,038	Raphoe	Conwal	Letterkenny
Rarooey	105	Tirhugh	Donegal	Donegal
Rashedoge	46	Raphoe	Conwal	Letterkenny
Rashenny	791	Inishowen East	Clonmany	Inishowen
Rath	125	Tirhugh	Drumhome	Donegal
Rath Mountain	710	Tirhugh	Drumhome	Donegal
Rathdonnell	684	Kilmacrenan	Kilmacrenan	Letterkenny
Rathfragan	67	Tirhugh	Drumhome	Ballyshannon
Rathglass	175	Tirhugh	Inishmacsaint	Ballyshannon
Rathgory	92	Kilmacrenan	Clondavaddog	Millford
Rathlin O'Birne Island	50	Tirhugh	Kilbarron	Glenties
**Rathmelton**	Town	Kilmacrenan	Aughnish	Millford
Rathmelton	534	Kilmacrenan	Aughnish	Millford
Rathmore	481	Tirhugh	Inishmacsaint	Ballyshannon
**Rathmullan**	Town	Kilmacrenan	Killygarvan	Millford
Rathmullan	484	Kilmacrenan	Killygarvan	Millford
Rathtinny Glebe	90	Tirhugh	Drumhome	Donegal
Ratteen	103	Raphoe	Taughboyne	Strabane
Rawros	216	Kilmacrenan	Mevagh	Millford
Raws Lower	236	Raphoe	Donaghmore	Strabane
Raws Upper	455	Raphoe	Donaghmore	Strabane
Ray	1,847	Kilmacrenan	Raymunterdoney	Dunfanaghy
Ray	574	Kilmacrenan	Aughnish	Millford
Ray	167	Kilmacrenan	Kilmacrenan	Millford
Raymoghy	372	Raphoe	Raymoghy	Letterkenny
Red Island	6	Kilmacrenan	Clondahorky	Dunfanaghy
Redford Glebe	474	Inishowen East	Clonca	Inishowen
Revlin	100	Banagh	Killymard	Donegal
Rinboy	183	Kilmacrenan	Clondavaddog	Millford
Rinclevan	260	Kilmacrenan	Clondahorky	Dunfanaghy
Rinmore	315	Kilmacrenan	Clondavaddog	Millford
Rinnafarset	557	Boylagh	Templecrone	Glenties
Rinnakill	183	Banagh	Glencolumbkille	Glenties
Rinnaraw	78	Kilmacrenan	Clondahorky	Dunfanaghy
Rinnasligo	225	Kilmacrenan	Clondahorky	Dunfanaghy
Rinrainy Island	19	Boylagh	Templecrone	Glenties
Roancarrick Island	5	Boylagh	Inishkeel	Glenties
Roanish Island	21	Boylagh	Inishkeel	Glenties
Rock	194	Banagh	Inver	Donegal
Rockfield	105	Raphoe	Taughboyne	Strabane
Rockhill	763	Tirhugh	Drumhome	Ballyshannon
Rockhill	121	Kilmacrenan	Clondahorky	Dunfanaghy
Rockhill	249	Raphoe	Leck	Letterkenny
Roechrow	352	Banagh	Inishkeel	Glenties
Roechrow	300	Banagh	Killybegs Upper	Glenties
Roelough	130	Banagh	Kilcar	Glenties
Roes	289	Banagh	Inver	Donegal
Roganspark	9	Raphoe	Urney	Strabane
Rooney's Island	33	Tirhugh	Drumhome	Donegal
Roosky	388	Kilmacrenan	Clondahorky	Dunfanaghy
Roosky	1,239	Inishowen East	Clonmany	Inishowen
Roosky	212	Inishowen East	Moville Upper	Inishowen
Roosky	601	Raphoe	Raymoghy	Letterkenny
Roosky	458	Raphoe	Allsaints	Londonderry
Roosky	525	Inishowen West	Fahan Upper	Londonderry
Roosky Lower	135	Raphoe	Raphoe	Strabane
Roosky Upper	738	Raphoe	Raphoe	Strabane
Rosepenna	543	Kilmacrenan	Mevagh	Millford
Roshin	644	Kilmacrenan	Clondahorky	Dunfanaghy
Roshin	344	Banagh	Killybegs Upper	Glenties
Roshin	128	Kilmacrenan	Conwal	Letterkenny
Roshin	307	Kilmacrenan	Gartan	Letterkenny
Roshin Acres	235	Boylagh	Templecrone	Glenties
Roshin Lodge	67	Boylagh	Templecrone	Glenties
Roshin North	58	Boylagh	Templecrone	Glenties
Roshin South	198	Boylagh	Templecrone	Glenties
Rosnakill	320	Kilmacrenan	Clondavaddog	Millford
Rossbeg	325	Boylagh	Inishkeel	Glenties
Rossbrackan	247	Raphoe	Leck	Letterkenny
Rosscad	125	Kilmacrenan	Clondahorky	Dunfanaghy
Rosscanlan	27	Tirhugh	Drumhome	Ballyshannon
Rosscat	204	Tirhugh	Kilbarron	Ballyshannon
Rossdoo Island	2	Banagh	Killymard	Donegal
Rossgarrow	276	Kilmacrenan	Tullyfern	Millford
Rossgeir	281	Raphoe	Clonleigh	Strabane
Rossilly	147	Tirhugh	Drumhome	Donegal
Rossilly Barr	301	Tirhugh	Drumhome	Donegal
Rosskirk and Killhill	561	Kilmacrenan	Clondavaddog	Millford
Rossmore	89	Tirhugh	Drumhome	Donegal
Rossnowlagh Lower	401	Tirhugh	Drumhome	Ballyshannon
Rossnowlagh Upper (or Crockahany)	389	Tirhugh	Drumhome	Ballyshannon
Rossreagh	76	Kilmacrenan	Tullyfern	Millford
Rossylongan	154	Banagh	Killymard	Donegal
Rossyvolan	83	Tirhugh	Drumhome	Donegal
Rotten Island	1	Banagh	Killybegs Upper	Glenties
Rough Island	6	Kilmacrenan	Tullyfern	Millford
Roughan	138	Raphoe	Conwal	Letterkenny
Roughan	117	Raphoe	Allsaints	Londonderry
Roughan	68	Kilmacrenan	Tullyfern	Millford
Roughan	66	Raphoe	Clonleigh	Strabane
Roughan Glebe	109	Raphoe	Allsaints	Londonderry
Roughpark	171	Kilmacrenan	Aghanunshin	Letterkenny
Roughpark	73	Kilmacrenan	Aughnish	Millford
Rowantreehill	193	Tirhugh	Kilbarron	Ballyshannon
Roxborough Glebe	500	Banagh	Kilcar	Glenties
Rushen	996	Tirhugh	Templecarn	Donegal
Rushyhill	208	Raphoe	Donaghmore	Stranorlar
Rutland Island	312	Boylagh	Templecrone	Glenties
Ryelands	453	Raphoe	Raymoghy	Strabane
**St Johnstown**	Town	Raphoe	Taughboyne	Strabane
Saintjohnstown	279	Raphoe	Taughboyne	Strabane
Saints Island	10	Tirhugh	Templecarn	Donegal
Sallaghagrane	208	Kilmacrenan	Conwal	Letterkenny
Sallows	2,469	Banagh	Inver	Donegal
Sallybrook	66	Raphoe	Raymoghy	Londonderry
Sallywood	391	Raphoe	Donaghmore	Stranorlar
Salthill Demesne	308	Banagh	Inver	Donegal
Saltpans	167	Boylagh	Templecrone	Glenties
Saltpans	262	Kilmacrenan	Killygarvan	Millford
Sand Island	9	Banagh	Inishkeel	Glenties
Sandfield	605	Boylagh	Inishkeel	Glenties
Sandhill	77	Kilmacrenan	Clondahorky	Dunfanaghy
Scaddaman	203	Banagh	Inishkeel	Glenties
Scotland	46	Raphoe	Donaghmore	Stranorlar
Scrawhill	61	Banagh	Killymard	Donegal
Scribly	213	Raphoe	Leck	Letterkenny
Seacor	386	Kilmacrenan	Conwal	Letterkenny
Seadavog Mountain	745	Tirhugh	Templecarn	Donegal
Seahill and Tuckmill Hill	118	Banagh	Inver	Donegal
Seedagh	180	Kilmacrenan	Clondavaddog	Millford
Sesnacully	55	Raphoe	Raphoe	Strabane
Sessiagh	101	Kilmacrenan	Clondavaddog	Millford
Sessiagh	103	Raphoe	Donaghmore	Strabane
Sessiagh (Allison)	123	Raphoe	Donaghmore	Strabane
Sessiagh (Long)	208	Raphoe	Donaghmore	Strabane
Sessiagh (O'Neill)	224	Raphoe	Donaghmore	Stranorlar
Sessiaghkeelta	515	Tirhugh	Templecarn	Donegal
Shallogan Beg	698	Boylagh	Inishkeel	Glenties
Shallogan More	2,194	Boylagh	Inishkeel	Glenties
Shalwy	182	Banagh	Kilcar	Glenties
Shanaghan	194	Banagh	Inishkeel	Glenties
Shanbally	819	Banagh	Glencolumbkille	Glenties
Shandrim	1,323	Inishowen West	Fahan Lower	Inishowen
Shannagh	961	Tirhugh	Drumhome	Donegal
Shannagh	309	Banagh	Kilcar	Glenties
Shannagh	115	Raphoe	Raphoe	Strabane
Shannaghdoo	364	Kilmacrenan	Clondavaddog	Millford
Shannon Lower	185	Raphoe	Clonleigh	Strabane
Shannon Middle	197	Raphoe	Clonleigh	Strabane
Sharagore	798	Inishowen West	Desertegny	Inishowen
Sharon Glebe	103	Raphoe	Raymoghy	Londonderry
Sheegys	224	Tirhugh	Kilbarron	Ballyshannon
Sheep Park	115	Boylagh	Templecrone	Glenties
Sheercloon	121	Raphoe	Clonleigh	Strabane
Shellfield	54	Kilmacrenan	Aughnish	Millford
Sheskinapoll	158	Raphoe	Raymoghy	Strabane
Sheskinarone	1,313	Boylagh	Templecrone	Glenties
Sheskinatawy	195	Banagh	Inver	Donegal
Sheskinbeg	215	Kilmacrenan	Tullaghobegly	Dunfanaghy
**Single Street**	Town	Tirhugh	Inishmacsaint	Ballyshannon
Sixty Acres	73	Raphoe	Clonleigh	Strabane
Skeagh	331	Kilmacrenan	Clondahorky	Dunfanaghy
Skelpy	278	Raphoe	Urney	Strabane
Skeoge	188	Inishowen West	Burt	Londonderry
Skerry	184	Kilmacrenan	Kilmacrenan	Millford
Skreen	360	Tirhugh	Drumhome	Donegal
Skreen Lower	442	Kilmacrenan	Kilmacrenan	Millford
Skreen Upper	223	Kilmacrenan	Kilmacrenan	Millford
Sladran	1,267	Inishowen West	Fahan Lower	Inishowen
Slatehill	68	Raphoe	Allsaints	Londonderry
Sleeghan	214	Kilmacrenan	Tullaghobegly	Dunfanaghy
Slievebuck	140	Raphoe	Raphoe	Letterkenny
Sminver	99	Tirhugh	Kilbarron	Ballyshannon
Snugborough	406	Banagh	Killybegs Lower	Glenties
Sockar	1,047	Kilmacrenan	Kilmacrenan	Letterkenny
Soppog	606	Inishowen West	Muff	Londonderry
Sorne	691	Inishowen West	Fahan Lower	Inishowen
Spaddan	68	Tirhugh	Kilbarron	Ballyshannon
Speenoge	522	Inishowen West	Burt	Londonderry
Spierstown	103	Tirhugh	Donegal	Donegal
Springfield	341	Kilmacrenan	Clondavaddog	Millford
Springhill	100	Raphoe	Clonleigh	Strabane
Sruell	2,772	Banagh	Killymard	Donegal
Sruhangarrow	248	Kilmacrenan	Gartan	Letterkenny
Sruhangarrow Mountain	325	Kilmacrenan	Gartan	Letterkenny
Sruhanreagh	296	Kilmacrenan	Tullaghobegly	Dunfanaghy
Stackarnagh	503	Kilmacrenan	Conwal	Letterkenny
Staghall	133	Kilmacrenan	Gartan	Letterkenny
Staghall Mountain	423	Kilmacrenan	Gartan	Letterkenny
Staghall Mountain East	332	Kilmacrenan	Gartan	Letterkenny
Staghall Mountain West	1,683	Kilmacrenan	Gartan	Dunfanaghy
Starritstown	71	Raphoe	Convoy	Stranorlar
Station Island	1	Tirhugh	Templecarn	Donegal
Stormhill	100	Banagh	Killybegs Lower	Glenties
Strabinna Lower	188	Banagh	Kilcar	Glenties
Strabinna Upper	211	Banagh	Kilcar	Glenties
Straboy	1,212	Banagh	Glencolumbkille	Glenties
Straboy	1,391	Boylagh	Inishkeel	Glenties
Stracashel	391	Boylagh	Inishkeel	Glenties
Stragally	270	Raphoe	Kilteevoge	Stranorlar
Stragar	908	Banagh	Killybegs Upper	Glenties
Stragraddy	1,847	Kilmacrenan	Kilmacrenan	Millford
Straid	3,171	Inishowen East	Clonmany	Inishowen
Straid (or Glebe)	83	Banagh	Glencolumbkille	Glenties
Strakeenagh	556	Kilmacrenan	Tullaghobegly	Dunfanaghy
Straleel	855	Banagh	Kilcar	Glenties
Straleel Glebe	3	Banagh	Kilcar	Glenties
Straleel North	879	Banagh	Glencolumbkille	Glenties
Straleel South	709	Banagh	Glencolumbkille	Glenties
Straleeny	58	Banagh	Killybegs Upper	Glenties
Stralinchy	159	Boylagh	Inishkeel	Glenties
Stralongford	756	Raphoe	Convoy	Stranorlar
Stramackilmartin	217	Kilmacrenan	Tullaghobegly	Dunfanaghy
Stramore	198	Kilmacrenan	Gartan	Letterkenny
Stramore Upper	911	Kilmacrenan	Gartan	Letterkenny
Stranabrattoge	647	Raphoe	Kilteevoge	Stranorlar
Stranabrooey	392	Kilmacrenan	Tullaghobegly	Dunfanaghy
Stranaclea	389	Inishowen West	Fahan Lower	Inishowen
Stranacoreragh	336	Kilmacrenan	Tullaghobegly	Dunfanaghy
Stranagartan	119	Banagh	Glencolumbkille	Glenties
Stranaglogh	730	Boylagh	Inishkeel	Glenties
Stranagoppoge	353	Boylagh	Inishkeel	Glenties
Stranakirk	310	Banagh	Kilcar	Glenties
Stranamuck	104	Raphoe	Donaghmore	Strabane
Stranasaggart	269	Boylagh	Lettermacaward	Glenties
Straness	413	Tirhugh	Drumhome	Donegal
Stranorlaghan	78	Raphoe	Raphoe	Strabane
**Stranorlar**	Town	Raphoe	Stranorlar	Stranorlar
Stranorlar	259	Raphoe	Stranorlar	Stranorlar
Strasallagh	623	Boylagh	Inishkeel	Glenties
Straths	374	Inishowen East	Clonmany	Inishowen
Stravally	922	Banagh	Inishkeel	Glenties
Strawoaghter Glebe	720	Banagh	Killybegs Lower	Glenties
Stroangarrow	1,155	Raphoe	Kilteevoge	Stranorlar
Stroangibbagh	447	Raphoe	Convoy	Stranorlar
Stroangibbagh	359	Raphoe	Kilteevoge	Stranorlar
Stroove	1,052	Inishowen East	Moville Lower	Inishowen
Summerhill	261	Banagh	Killymard	Donegal
Summy	447	Boylagh	Inishkeel	Glenties
Swilly	122	Raphoe	Taughboyne	Strabane
Swillybrin	152	Kilmacrenan	Clondahorky	Dunfanaghy
Tamnawood	64	Raphoe	Clonleigh	Strabane
Tamur	608	Banagh	Inver	Donegal
Tamur	1,365	Tirhugh	Templecarn	Donegal
Tangaveane	351	Boylagh	Inishkeel	Glenties
Tangaveane	1,634	Boylagh	Templecrone	Glenties
Taughboy	484	Raphoe	Donaghmore	Stranorlar
Tawlaght	575	Tirhugh	Templecarn	Donegal
Tawnacrom	190	Raphoe	Donaghmore	Strabane
Tawnagh	120	Tirhugh	Donegal	Donegal
Tawnaghgorm	173	Tirhugh	Donegal	Donegal
Tawnaghlahan	126	Tirhugh	Donegal	Donegal
Tawnalary	66	Tirhugh	Donegal	Donegal
Tawnasligo	97	Banagh	Killybegs Upper	Glenties
Tawnawully Mountains	6,053	Tirhugh	Donegal	Donegal
Tawny	585	Banagh	Kilcar	Glenties
Tawny	237	Kilmacrenan	Clondavaddog	Millford
Tawny Lower	179	Kilmacrenan	Kilmacrenan	Millford
Tawny Middle	79	Kilmacrenan	Kilmacrenan	Millford
Tawny Upper	169	Kilmacrenan	Kilmacrenan	Millford
Tawnygorm	126	Banagh	Inver	Donegal
Tawnyvorgal	135	Banagh	Killymard	Donegal
Teangue	53	Raphoe	Stranorlar	Stranorlar
Teevickmoy	520	Raphoe	Stranorlar	Stranorlar
Templedouglas	26	Kilmacrenan	Conwal	Letterkenny
Templemoule	1,013	Inishowen East	Clonca	Inishowen
Templenew	100	Tirhugh	Kilbarron	Ballyshannon
Termon	301	Boylagh	Templecrone	Glenties
The Hassans	1	Kilmacrenan	Clondavaddog	Millford
Three Trees	1,121	Inishowen West	Muff	Londonderry
Tievachorky	274	Banagh	Inver	Donegal
Tievebane	447	Inishowen West	Fahan Upper	Londonderry
Tieveboy	133	Raphoe	Clonleigh	Strabane
Tievebrack	222	Tirhugh	Drumhome	Ballyshannon
Tievebrack	307	Raphoe	Donaghmore	Strabane
Tievecloghoge	1,511	Raphoe	Donaghmore	Stranorlar
Tievedeevan	458	Boylagh	Inishkeel	Glenties
Tievedooly	224	Banagh	Inver	Donegal
Tievegarvlagh	241	Boylagh	Templecrone	Glenties
Tievelough	240	Boylagh	Inishkeel	Glenties
Tievemore	2,194	Tirhugh	Templecarn	Donegal
Tieveragh	206	Boylagh	Inishkeel	Glenties
Tieveskeelta	496	Banagh	Killybegs Upper	Glenties
Tievetooey	1,257	Tirhugh	Templecarn	Donegal
Tinklersford	59	Raphoe	Raymoghy	Londonderry
Tinnycahil	113	Tirhugh	Donegal	Donegal
Tirargus	1,126	Kilmacrenan	Kilmacrenan	Millford
Tircallan	131	Raphoe	Stranorlar	Stranorlar
Tirconeen	28	Tirhugh	Kilbarron	Ballyshannon
Tirevlin	51	Kilmacrenan	Clondavaddog	Millford
Tirharon	148	Raphoe	Raymoghy	Letterkenny
Tirhomin	577	Kilmacrenan	Tullyfern	Millford
Tirinisk	252	Raphoe	Donaghmore	Strabane
Tirkeeran	92	Raphoe	Clonleigh	Strabane
Tirkillin	457	Kilmacrenan	Kilmacrenan	Millford
Tirlaydan	465	Kilmacrenan	Clondavaddog	Millford
Tirlin	75	Kilmacrenan	Clondahorky	Dunfanaghy
Tirloughan	421	Kilmacrenan	Mevagh	Millford
Tirmacroragh	664	Inishowen East	Culdaff	Inishowen
Tirnagushoge (or Bicketstown)	140	Raphoe	Donaghmore	Strabane
Tironeill	179	Raphoe	Clonleigh	Strabane
Tirroddy	170	Raphoe	Taughboyne	Londonderry
Tirroddy	158	Kilmacrenan	Tullyfern	Millford
Tiryrone	964	Inishowen East	Moville Upper	Inishowen
Tober	1,529	Tirhugh	Kilbarron	Ballyshannon
Tober	275	Raphoe	Taughboyne	Londonderry
Toberkeen	461	Boylagh	Templecrone	Glenties
Tobernahoory	147	Tirhugh	Drumhome	Donegal
Toberoneill	225	Raphoe	Clonleigh	Strabane
Toberslane	168	Raphoe	Killea	Londonderry
Tommyscroft (or Craigs)	143	Raphoe	Convoy	Stranorlar
Tonagh	554	Raphoe	Taughboyne	Londonderry
Tonbane Glebe	143	Kilmacrenan	Clondavaddog	Millford
Tonduff	699	Inishowen West	Desertegny	Inishowen
Tonduff	290	Raphoe	Kilteevoge	Stranorlar
Tonduff (Thompson)	207	Raphoe	Kilteevoge	Stranorlar
Tonregee	65	Tirhugh	Kilbarron	Ballyshannon
Tonregee	226	Banagh	Inver	Donegal
Tonyhabboc	94	Raphoe	Allsaints	Londonderry
Toome	541	Boylagh	Lettermacaward	Glenties
Toome	357	Kilmacrenan	Clondavaddog	Millford
Toories and Rannagh	338	Boylagh	Templecrone	Glenties
Tooslenagh	312	Raphoe	Conwal	Stranorlar
Tops	262	Raphoe	Raphoe	Strabane
Tops Demesne	134	Raphoe	Raphoe	Strabane
Tor	3,115	Kilmacrenan	Tullaghobegly	Dunfanaghy
Toragh	213	Kilmacrenan	Mevagh	Millford
Toralaydan Island	2	Banagh	Glencolumbkille	Glenties
Torglass Island	2	Kilmacrenan	Tullaghobegly	Dunfanaghy
Tormore Island	4	Banagh	Glencolumbkille	Glenties
Tornacolpagh Island	2	Kilmacrenan	Tullaghobegly	Dunfanaghy
Tory Island	785	Kilmacrenan	Tullaghobegly	Dunfanaghy
Toulett	552	Inishowen West	Burt	Londonderry
Town Parks	120	Raphoe	Clonleigh	Strabane
Townparks	295	Tirhugh	Kilbarron	Ballyshannon
Treanamullin	188	Raphoe	Stranorlar	Stranorlar
Treanavinny	165	Raphoe	Leck	Letterkenny
Treanbeg	229	Kilmacrenan	Conwal	Letterkenny
Treanboy	155	Raphoe	Convoy	Stranorlar
Treanfasy (or Glasalt)	1,448	Inishowen East	Donagh	Inishowen
Treankeel	567	Raphoe	Conwal	Stranorlar
Treansallagh	297	Raphoe	Taughboyne	Strabane
Treantaboy	901	Raphoe	Convoy	Stranorlar
Treantagh	249	Raphoe	Taughboyne	Strabane
Treantaghmucklagh	352	Raphoe	Taughboyne	Strabane
Trillick	444	Inishowen West	Fahan Lower	Inishowen
Trimragh	324	Raphoe	Leck	Letterkenny
Tromaty	586	Inishowen East	Moville Upper	Inishowen
Tromaty	432	Inishowen West	Muff	Inishowen
Trumman East	832	Tirhugh	Drumhome	Donegal
Trumman West	270	Tirhugh	Drumhome	Donegal
Trumman West Barr	344	Tirhugh	Drumhome	Donegal
Trusk	1,326	Raphoe	Donaghmore	Stranorlar
Tuckmill Hill & Scahill	118	Banagh	Inver	Donegal
Tullagh	711	Inishowen West	Clonmany	Inishowen
Tullagh	1,109	Kilmacrenan	Mevagh	Millford
Tullaghacullion	176	Banagh	Killybegs Upper	Glenties
Tullaghcullion	66	Tirhugh	Donegal	Donegal
Tullaghobegly Irish	2,448	Kilmacrenan	Tullaghobegly	Dunfanaghy
Tullaghobegly Scotch	1,425	Kilmacrenan	Tullaghobegly	Dunfanaghy
Tullanascreen	135	Kilmacrenan	Conwal	Letterkenny
Tullanree	581	Inishowen East	Donagh	Inishowen
Tullinlagan	141	Banagh	Inver	Donegal
Tullinlough	156	Banagh	Inver	Donegal
Tullinteane	1,011	Banagh	Killaghtee	Donegal
Tully	88	Tirhugh	Kilbarron	Ballyshannon
Tully	195	Tirhugh	Donegal	Donegal
Tully	129	Raphoe	Raymoghy	Letterkenny
Tully	166	Kilmacrenan	Clondavaddog	Millford
Tully Beg	1,024	Boylagh	Inishkeel	Glenties
Tully Beg	72	Inishowen West	Clonea	Inishowen
Tully Beg	135	Kilmacrenan	Gartan	Letterkenny
Tully Beg	240	Kilmacrenan	Tullyfern	Millford
Tully Hall	72	Kilmacrenan	Tullyfern	Millford
Tully More	632	Boylagh	Inishkeel	Glenties
Tully More	110	Inishowen East	Clonea	Inishowen
Tully More	110	Kilmacrenan	Gartan	Letterkenny
Tully More	159	Kilmacrenan	Tullyfern	Millford
Tully Mountain	135	Kilmacrenan	Tullyfern	Millford
Tullyally	1,062	Inishowen East	Moville Upper	Inishowen
Tullyannan	218	Raphoe	Allsaints	Londonderry
Tullyannan Glebe	148	Raphoe	Allsaints	Londonderry
Tullyard	1,108	Boylagh	Inishkeel	Glenties
Tullyard	130	Raphoe	Urney	Strabane
Tullyarvan	828	Inishowen West	Fahan Lower	Inishowen
Tullybogly	176	Raphoe	Raymoghy	Letterkenny
Tullybrook (or Tullyleague)	138	Tirhugh	Drumhome	Donegal
Tullycarn	161	Tirhugh	Templecarn	Donegal
Tullychullion	189	Kilmacrenan	Conwal	Letterkenny
Tullycleave Beg	243	Boylagh	Inishkeel	Glenties
Tullycleave More	770	Boylagh	Inishkeel	Glenties
Tullyconnell	295	Kilmacrenan	Clondavaddog	Millford
Tullycumber	253	Banagh	Inver	Donegal
Tullydonnell Lower	146	Raphoe	Raphoe	Strabane
Tullydonnell Upper	214	Raphoe	Raphoe	Strabane
Tullydush Lower	454	Inishowen West	Fahan Lower	Inishowen
Tullydush Upper	722	Inishowen West	Fahan Lower	Inishowen
Tullyearl	188	Tirhugh	Drumhome	Donegal
Tullygallan, Tullywee (or and Oughtnadrin Barr)	1,434	Tirhugh	Drumhome	Donegal
Tullygallan	167	Tirhugh	Drumhome	Donegal
Tullygay	766	Kilmacrenan	Conwal	Letterkenny
Tullyhonour	1,019	Raphoe	Conwal	Stranorlar
Tullyhonwar	247	Boylagh	Killybegs Lower	Glenties
Tullyhorky	329	Tirhugh	Kilbarron	Ballyshannon
Tullyillan	79	Boylagh	Templecrone	Glenties
Tullyillan Island	3	Boylagh	Templecrone	Glenties
Tullylark	198	Tirhugh	Templecarn	Donegal
Tullyleague (or Tullybrook)	138	Tirhugh	Drumhome	Donegal
Tullyloskan	128	Tirhugh	Donegal	Donegal
Tullymore	302	Tirhugh	Kilbarron	Ballyshannon
Tullymornin	55	Tirhugh	Drumhome	Donegal
Tullynabratilly	974	Inishowen East	Clonmany	Inishowen
Tullynadall	117	Kilmacrenan	Clondavaddog	Millford
Tullynaglack	122	Banagh	Inver	Donegal
Tullynaglaggan	856	Boylagh	Inishkeel	Glenties
Tullynagreana	882	Banagh	Inver	Donegal
Tullynaha	277	Banagh	Inver	Donegal
Tullynavinn	894	Inishowen East	Moville Upper	Inishowen
Tullyowen	152	Raphoe	Taughboyne	Strabane
Tullyrap	166	Raphoe	Taughboyne	Strabane
Tullytrasna	138	Banagh	Inver	Donegal
Tullytrasna	808	Raphoe	Kilteevoge	Stranorlar
Tullyvinny	174	Raphoe	Raphoe	Strabane
Tullyvoos	257	Banagh	Inver	Donegal
Tullywee	167	Tirhugh	Drumhome	Donegal
Tullywee (or Tullygallan)	1,434	Tirhugh	Drumhome	Donegal
Ture	1,165	Inishowen West	Muff	Londonderry
Twomilestone	60	Tirhugh	Kilbarron	Ballyshannon
Tyleford	21	Raphoe	Clonleigh	Strabane
Umfin Island	17	Kilmacrenan	Tullaghobegly	Dunfanaghy
Umgall	461	Inishowen East	Clonca	Inishowen
Umlagh	403	Kilmacrenan	Mevagh	Millford
Ummerafad	216	Kilmacrenan	Clondahorky	Dunfanaghy
Ummerawirrinan	197	Banagh	Glencolumbkille	Glenties
Umrycam	645	Inishowen West	Fahan Lower	Inishowen
Umrycam	314	Kilmacrenan	Clondavaddog	Millford
Umuskan	401	Banagh	Kilcar	Glenties
Unshinagh Lower	94	Raphoe	Clonleigh	Strabane
Unshinagh Upper	80	Raphoe	Clonleigh	Strabane
Urbal	145	Banagh	Killaghtee	Donegal
Urbaldeevan	660	Boylagh	Inishkeel	Glenties
Urbalreagh	545	Inishowen East	Clonea	Inishowen
Urbalshinny	19	Tirhugh	Drumhome	Donegal
Urbalshinny	104	Kilmacrenan	Tullyfern	Millford
Urrismenagh	1,564	Inishowen East	Clonmany	Inishowen
Veagh	400	Raphoe	Raymoghy	Letterkenny
Warrentown	443	Kilmacrenan	Gartan	Letterkenny
Warrentown Mountn North	380	Kilmacrenan	Gartan	Dunfanaghy
Warrentown Mountn South	425	Kilmacrenan	Gartan	Letterkenny
Welchtown	465	Raphoe	Kilteevoge	Stranorlar
Whitecastle	109	Inishowen East	Moville Upper	Inishowen
Whitehill	58	Tirhugh	Donegal	Donegal
Whitehill	258	Kilmacrenan	Conwal	Letterkenny
Whitehill	422	Kilmacrenan	Gartan	Letterkenny
Whitehill	267	Raphoe	Taughboyne	Strabane
Whitehill	68	Raphoe	Donaghmore	Stranorlar
Whitehouse	112	Raphoe	Killea	Londonderry
Wilson's Fort (or Killynure)	356	Raphoe	Convoy	Stranorlar
Windyhall	209	Kilmacrenan	Conwal	Letterkenny
Winnyhaw	265	Raphoe	Raphoe	Strabane
Winterhill	141	Banagh	Killymard	Donegal
Wood	41	Raphoe	Clonleigh	Strabane
Wood Island	39	Raphoe	Clonleigh	Strabane
Woodhill	110	Kilmacrenan	Clondahorky	Dunfanaghy
Woodhill	62	Banagh	Killybegs Lower	Glenties
Woodhill	149	Raphoe	Raymoghy	Letterkenny
Woodland	205	Kilmacrenan	Aghanunshin	Letterkenny
Woodlands	287	Raphoe	Taughboyne	Strabane
Woodpark	92	Raphoe	Leck	Letterkenny
Woodquarter	682	Kilmacrenan	Kilmacrenan	Millford
Woodtown	142	Kilmacrenan	Conwal	Letterkenny
