= Disappearance of Mary Boyle =

Ireland's longest missing child case

Mary Boyle
- Boyle one week before her disappearance
- Born: 14 June 1970; Sparkhill, Birmingham, England, UK
- Disappeared: 18 March 1977 (aged 6); Cashelard, Ballyshannon, Ireland
- Status: Missing for 49 years, 5 months and 22 days

Mary Boyle (born 14 June 1970) was a six-year-old Irish girl who disappeared on the County Donegal-County Fermanagh border on 18 March 1977. To date, her disappearance is the longest missing child case in the Republic of Ireland. The investigation into her disappearance has been beset by allegations of political intervention and police incompetence.

== Disappearance ==
Mary Boyle was last seen at 3:30pm on 18 March 1977 near her grandparents' rural farm in Cashelard, near Ballyshannon, County Donegal. The family, including Boyle's mother Ann, father Charlie, older brother Paddy and twin sister Ann, had gone to her maternal grandparents' house on Saint Patrick's Day from their home in Kincasslagh in The Rosses, further up the coast.

Boyle was playing outside with her siblings and two cousins when her uncle left to return a ladder to another farm, 400 yards (370 m) across the hillside. She followed her uncle until they reached a small pool of water that was too deep for her to get through. Whether by her own decision or by her uncle's instruction, Boyle turned around halfway into the journey saying she was going back to her grandparents' house. Her return journey should not have lasted longer than five minutes, whilst her uncle stayed at the neighbours for thirty minutes for a chat.

After discovering that Boyle had disappeared, her family instituted searches of the local area and questioned passers-by if they had seen the girl. One fisherman was quoted as saying that he had seen Boyle being put into a red car and then driven away, although he later corrected this in a BBC podcast by saying he had not actually seen Boyle, but just a suspicious red car. Many of the bogs in the area were drained and scoured in an effort to find the girl. Her twin sister, Ann, had stated that Boyle was eating a packet of crisps at the time of her disappearance and if she had fallen into a bog, the packet would have floated to the surface.

== Investigations ==
The Gardaí started a search of the surrounding area and drained a lake behind her grandparents' house. They also created a filmed reconstruction of the disappearance in which Ann was used as a stand-in for her twin sister. In 2008, the Irish public broadcaster RTÉ broadcast a documentary programme about the case. Over the intervening years, the performer Margo, a friend of and relation to the family, has funded searches on the surrounding hillsides in an effort to try and locate Boyle's body. Police searches have also taken place since 1977, with the latest taking place in 2016 when Gardaí launched a new investigation. However, no evidence has been found.

The investigation into Boyle's disappearance has attracted some publicity because of allegations of political interference which centred around the accusation that a politician phoned the Gardaí and told them to not question or detain their main suspect. Margo was said to have walked up to the politician who was accused of making the call in 1977 and asked if he had done so. According to Margo, he said "[that it] was untrue and called me a bare-faced liar." The length of time that Boyle has been missing, and allegations of official involvement, led The Guardian to label the case "Ireland's Madeleine McCann." Boyle's disappearance is now the longest-running missing child case in modern Irish history, and despite the publicity it attracts, it has not been debated in the Dáil. The case was raised by Lynn Boylan MEP in the European Parliament, where she highlighted the lack of direction in the investigation.

In 2018, relatives and supporters of Boyle's family held a silent protest outside the coroner's office in Stranorlar. The protest was intended to pressure the coroner to hold an inquest into Boyle's death which would allow key witnesses to be interviewed on public record for the first time. Boyle's twin sister Ann was among the group, which handed in a petition containing more than 10,000 signatures demanding that an inquest be held. In March 2018, Gardaí issued a request for information regarding the case and stated that the investigation was still live.

In 2016, controversial media personality Gemma O'Doherty produced a documentary titled Mary Boyle: The Untold Story, which explores several possible causes for her disappearance. In the documentary, Mary's sister Ann posits that Boyle was sexually abused and then murdered. The film came under some criticism by the people interviewed for the programme. Both of the retired Gardaí sergeants who talked onscreen deny that any political pressure was brought to bear on their investigation; one interviewing officer said he was told to "ease off" when questioning one of the suspects in the case, but this was by a senior officer in the room at the time of the suspect's interview. The film led to O'Doherty being sued for defamation by Fianna Fáil politician Sean McEniff for damages of €75,000, although McEniff was never mentioned by name in the film. In 2019, after McEniff's death, a judge granted his estate leave to continue the case.

== Suspects ==
The initial suspect, questioned soon after Boyle disappeared, was released without charge. Other suspects have been questioned in relation to the disappearance; Brian McMahon was taken in for questioning by Gardaí in October 2014 but was released without charge the following day. McMahon later went on public record denying any involvement in the disappearance and stating that local people knew he could not have been involved.

Robert Black, a Scottish serial killer of children, was also proposed as a suspect when it was revealed that he was a cross-border van driver who often visited County Donegal as part of his job and could have been in the area at the time of Boyle's disappearance. Black was known in the area and had been charged by Gardaí for after-hours drinking. His van was identified outside a pub in Annagry at the time of Boyle's disappearance. A witness later claimed that they had heard crying and whimpering from the rear of the van. However, by the time of O'Doherty's documentary, it was widely believed that Black could not have been responsible.

Ann and several other relatives of Boyle publicly claim they believe they know what happened to the girl and who is responsible for her disappearance. This has caused tension and a division within the family, with Ann's mother publicly admonishing her daughter in 2016; calling her public appeals "...the most ridiculous carry on I ever seen in my life."

== Aftermath ==
Boyle's father died in a fishing accident off the coast of Donegal in 2005. In 2011, Margo released the single "The Missing Mary Boyle" to raise funds for a new search. Due, in part, to Ann's public accusations, the Boyle family remain divided.

== See also ==
- List of people who disappeared mysteriously (1970s)
- Disappearance of Philip Cairns – 1986 disappearance of Irish schoolboy
