= Loch an Iúir =

Village in County Donegal, Ireland

Loch an Iúir Loughanure
- Village
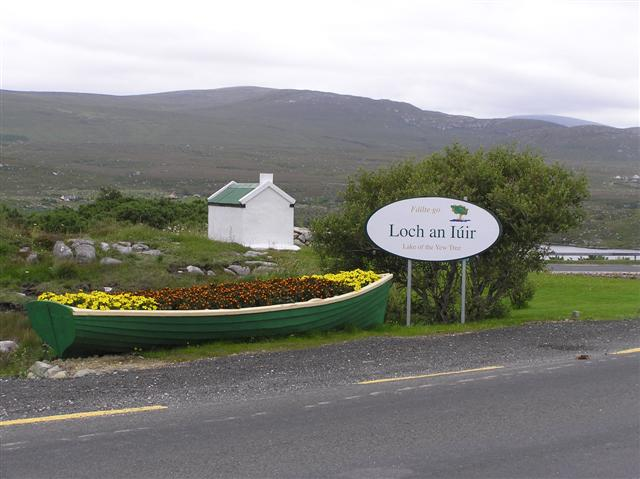

- Location in Ireland
- Coordinates: 54°59′53″N 8°17′29″W
- Country: Ireland
- Province: Ulster
- County: County Donegal
- Barony: Boylagh

Population (2022)
  - Total: 412
- Time zone: UTC+0 (WET)
  - Summer (DST): UTC-1 (IST (WEST))
- Irish Grid Reference: B810169

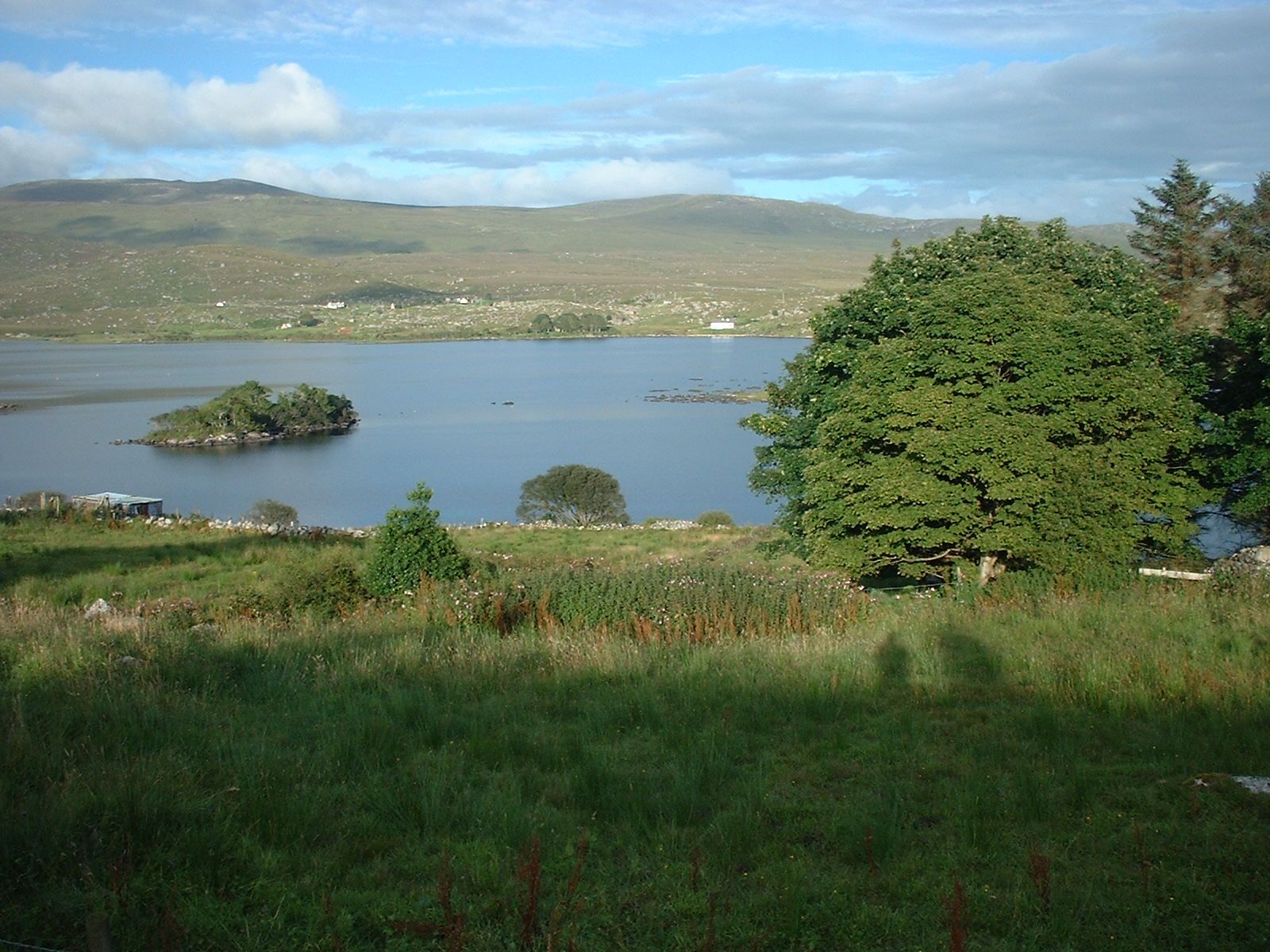
Loch an Iúir (Lake of the Yew Tree), with Oilean Iúir island at left

Loch an Iúir (Irish for 'lake of the yew'; pronounced [ˌl̪ˠɔx ən̠ʲ ˈuːɾʲ]), anglicised as Loughanure, is a village and townland in The Rosses, a district in the west of County Donegal in Ireland. The village is in the Gaeltacht (Irish-speaking region), being halfway between Gweedore and Dungloe, with the N56 road passing through the village. According to the 2016 census, 37% of the population spoke Irish on a daily basis outside the education system. The village of Loughanure lies within the Barony of Boylagh.

== Amenities ==
There is a traditional public house and restaurant known as Casadh an tSúgáin at the corner of the main road and the Annagry road. There is also a petrol service station with a convenience store opposite the Coláiste Mhuire Irish language college building. The Donegal Pens (a pen maker), featured on Dragon's Den, also operates in the village.

During the summer months, an Irish language college operates allowing youths to stay in or near the village and learn Irish for two weeks (Course A) or three weeks (Course B & C).

== Education ==
The local primary school is a gaelscoil (Irish language school) called Scoil Eoin Pol with 20 pupils. The nearest secondary school is Rosses Community School in Dungloe. There is also a school for secondary school students in the summer called Colaiste Mhuire Loch an Iuir formed in 1945.

On 19 April 2024, Scoil Eoin Pol was given the green light to provide additional classrooms for special needs.

== Transport ==
The village is serviced by TFI Local Link routes 271 Burtonport/Letterkenny, 992 Crolly/Dungloe and 966 Falcarragh/Dungloe.

== Notable people ==
- Niall Ó Dónaill (1908–1995), Irish language lexicographer and translator. His best known work is his Foclóir Gaeilge–Béarla (Irish–English Dictionary).

== See also ==
- List of populated places in Ireland
