= Niall Ó Dónaill =

Irish lexicographer

- Born: 27 August 1908; Ailt an Eidhinn, Loughanure, County Donegal, Ireland
- Died: February 10, 1995 (aged 86); Dublin, Ireland
- Occupation: Irish language lexicographer
- Spouse(s): Sorcha Ní Ghallchóir, Na Rosa, County Donegal, Ireland

Niall Ó Dónaill (27 August 1908 – 10 February 1995) was an Irish language lexicographer from Ailt an Eidhinn, Loughanure, County Donegal, Ireland. He was the oldest of the six children of Tarlach Ó Dónaill and Éilis Nic Ruairí from Grial, Loughanure. They had a little land and a few cows. His father, Tarlach, would spend June to November working for a farmer in Scotland and died when Niall was 13 years old. Ó Dónaill himself spent summers working in the tunnels in Scotland.

During his time at university, he spent his summers teaching at Coláiste Bhríde, Rann na Feirste.

Ó Dónaill is most famous for his work as editor of the 1977 Irish-English dictionary Foclóir Gaeilge-Béarla, which is still widely used today.

He received his education at Scoil Loch an Iúir in Loughanure before gaining a scholarship to St Eunan's College in Letterkenny. Another scholarship took him to University College Dublin to study Irish, English and History. In June 1982 he was awarded a D.Litt. by Trinity College Dublin.

Ó Dónaill wrote the book Bruigheann Féile which is based on stories of pastimes in the Gaeltacht town Loughanure and its surrounding area. His book Na Glúnta Rosannacha was first published in 1952.

He was awarded Gradam an Oireachtais at Oireachtas na Gaeilge in 1980.

Ó Dónaill died in 1995.

== Bibliography ==
Dictionary

- 1977 – Foclóir Gaeilge-Béarla – An Irish-English dictionary known as Foclóir Uí Dhónaill

Books

- 1934 – Bruighean feille – A collection of short stories and historical events in Loughanure
- 1937 – Beatha Sheáin Mhistéil – The life of John Mitchel
- 1951 – Forbairt na Gaeilge
- 1952 – Na Glúnta Rosannacha – A history of The Rosses and the story of the O'Donnell dynasty

Translations

- 1932 – Scairt an dúthchais (The Call of the Wild by Jack London);
- 1932 – Ise (She: A History of Adventure by H. Rider Haggard);
- 1935 – Máire (Marie by H. Rider Haggard);
- 1935 – Cineadh an fhásaigh (The Kindred of the Wild by Charles G. D. Roberts);
- 1935 – Mac rí na hÉireann (The King of Ireland's Son by Padraic Colum);
- 1936 – An chloch órtha (The Talisman by Walter Scott);
- 1936 – Roibeart Emmet (Robert Emmet by Raymond Postgate);
- 1937 – An Ministir Ó Ceallaigh (Parson Kelly by A.E.W. Mason and Andrew Lang);
- 1938 – Commando (Commando by Deneys Reitz);
- 1938 – Maighistir Bhaile na Trágha (The Master of Ballantrae by Robert Louis Stevenson)
- 1939 – An tOllphéist (Juggernaut by Alice Campbell);
- 1946 – Seachrán na nAingeal (The Demi-Gods by James Stephens);
- 1958 – Dhá choinneal do Mhuire (Two Candles for Mary, a religious publication by H.B. Zimmerman)
- 1996 (posthumous) – Cathair Phrotastúnach (Protestant City, a book about Belfast by Denis Ireland)
- Unpublished – An Bealach chun na Róimhe (The Path to Rome by Hilaire Belloc)
