= Owey Island =

Island in County Donegal, Ireland

Native name: Uaigh
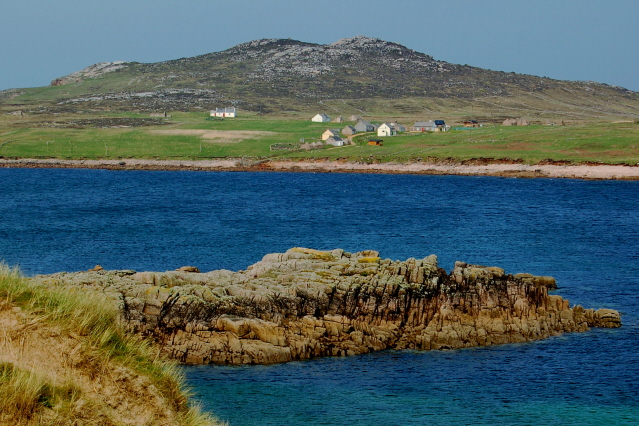

- Location within island of Ireland

Geography
- Location: Atlantic Ocean
- Coordinates: 55.0547°N 8.4508°W
- Area: 1.214 km^{2} (0.469 sq mi)
- Highest elevation: 102 m (335 ft)
- Highest point: Moylemore

Administration
- Ireland
- Province: Ulster
- County: Donegal

Demographics
- Population: 0 (seasonally occupied) (2021)

Owey Island (Irish: Uaigh, meaning 'cave') is an island off the west coast of County Donegal, Ireland.

== Geography ==
The island is around 120 hectares (300 acres) in area. It lies off the Donegal coast near Kincasslagh. The island's highest hill, Moylemore, has a summit elevation of 102 m. The buildings of the island are located on its southern part, the northern part being rocky and exposed to winds. On Owey there is no mains electricity or public water supply.

== Demographics ==
Historical population

Year	Pop.	±%
1841	94	—
1851	118	+25.5%
1861	127	+7.6%
1871	130	+2.4%
1881	141	+8.5%
1891	139	−1.4%
1901	137	−1.4%
1911	152	+10.9%

Year	Pop.	±%
1926	143	−5.9%
1936	125	−12.6%
1946	105	−16.0%
1951	106	+1.0%
1956	99	−6.6%
1961	95	−4.0%
1966	76	−20.0%
1971	51	−32.9%

Year	Pop.	±%
1979	0	−100.0%
1981	0	0.00%
1986	0	0.00%
1991	0	0.00%
1996	0	0.00%
2002	0	0.00%
2006	27	—
2011	0	−100.0%

Source: Central Statistics Office. "CNA17: Population by Off Shore Island, Sex and Year". CSO.ie.

The table reports data taken from Discover the Islands of Ireland (Alex Ritsema, Collins Press, 1999) and the Census of Ireland. Owey Island was full-time inhabited up to the mid-1970s. Later on, it had only part-time residents, mainly at summer. Most of them own old cottages inherited by ancestors who used to permanently live in the island.

== History ==
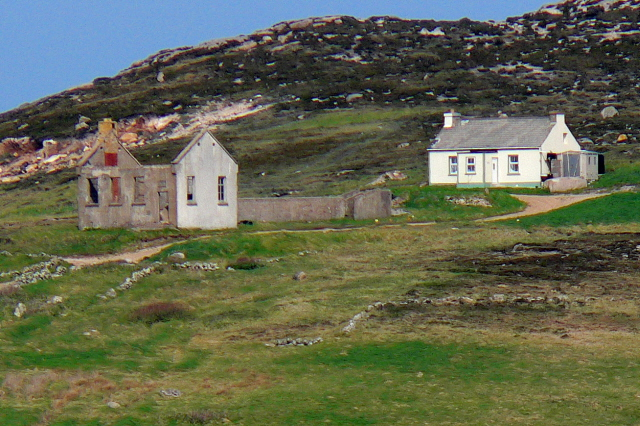
Abandoned schoolhouse; the new house at the right appears to be in use seasonally

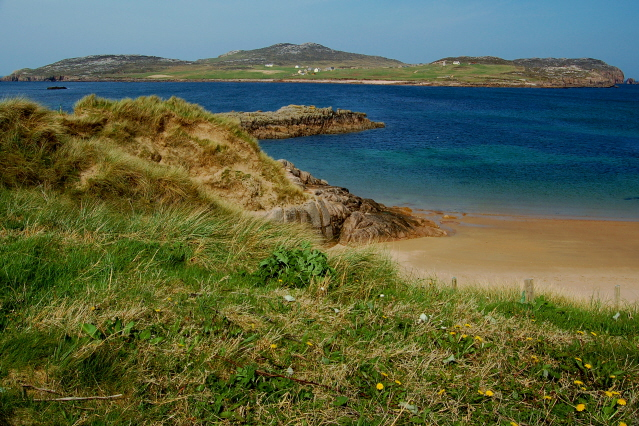
Overall view from the neighbouring Cruit Island

Plenty of fish in the waters surrounding the island and the land that, fertilized with seaweed, was suitable for growing vegetables, allowed a simple lifestyle to more than 100 people. Turf was used to heat the homes; some of the islanders used it also to heat the equipment to produce single malt and liquors.

Owey formerly had a post office and a school, which closed in 1971; its remains are still there. It had just one teacher in charge of the primary education of all ages, while for secondary education children went to the mainland.

== See also ==
- List of islands of Ireland
