= Pat "the Cope" Gallagher =

Irish politician (born 1948)

Pat "the Cope" Gallagher TD
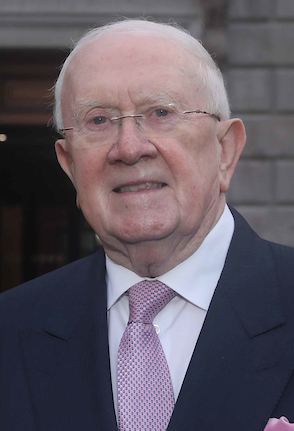
- Gallagher in 2024

Teachta Dála
- Incumbent
- Assumed office November 2024
- In office February 2016 – February 2020
- Constituency: Donegal
- In office May 2002 – 4 June 2009
- In office June 1981 – June 1997
- Constituency: Donegal South-West

Leas-Cheann Comhairle of Dáil Éireann
- In office 7 July 2016 – 10 February 2020
- Ceann Comhairle: Seán Ó Fearghaíl
- Preceded by: Michael P. Kitt
- Succeeded by: Catherine Connolly

Minister of State
- 2007–2008: Health and Children
- 2006–2007: Transport
- 2004–2006: Communications, Marine and Natural Resources
- 2002–2004: Environment, Heritage and Local Government
- 1993–1994: Arts, Culture and the Gaeltacht
- 1992–1993: Marine
- 1989–1993: Gaeltacht
- 1987–1989: Marine

Member of the European Parliament
- In office 1 July 2009 – 20 May 2014
- Constituency: North-West
- In office 1 July 1994 – 30 June 2002
- Constituency: Connacht–Ulster

Personal details
- Born: Patrick Gallagher; 10 March 1948 (age 78) Burtonport, County Donegal, Ireland
- Party: Fianna Fáil
- Spouse: Ann Gillespie (m. 1989)
- Education: University College Galway
- Website: Fianna Fáil website

Patrick Gallagher (Irish: Pádraig Ó Gallchóir; born 10 March 1948) is an Irish Fianna Fáil politician who has been a Teachta Dála (TD) for the Donegal constituency since the 2024 general election, and previously from 1981 to 1997, 2002 to 2009, 2016 to 2020. He served as Leas-Cheann Comhairle of Dáil Éireann from 2016 to 2020 and as a Minister of State from 1987 to 1994 and from 2002 to 2008. He also served as a Member of the European Parliament (MEP) from 1994 to 2002 and from 2009 to 2014.

== Background ==
Gallagher was born in Burtonport, a fishing port in The Rosses in the west of County Donegal. He is the grandson of Paddy 'the Cope' Gallagher, of the Irish Co-Operative movement. He was educated at Dungloe Secondary School – Rosses Community School, Coláiste Éinde in Salthill and at University College Galway (UCG), where he graduated with a Bachelor of Commerce in 1970. He worked as a fish exporter until 1982, becoming involved in local politics in 1979.

== Family ==
His nickname 'The Cope' refers to his family connection to The Cope agricultural cooperative which operates in The Rosses area of west Donegal. This name is used in his profile on the Fianna Fáil website and on the European Parliament website. Gallagher was a member of the European Parliament's Committee on Fisheries and also served as chair of the delegation for relations with Switzerland, Iceland and Norway and to the European Economic Area (EEA) Joint Parliamentary Committee.

Gallagher married Ann Gillespie in 1989. Ann and her sister, Eibhlin, both served almost 10 years of a 15-year sentence for conspiracy and explosive charges. In 1974, the sisters were visiting a house in Manchester when a bomb being made there exploded. Gillespie maintains her innocence, saying police used evidence from a discredited scientist, Frank Skuse, but does not wish to reopen the case. In 2005, Gillespie's solicitor Gareth Peirce stated that she believed the case could have been successfully re-opened.

== Political career ==
Gallagher was first elected to Dáil Éireann at the 1981 general election, retaining his seat until retiring at the 1997 general election. Gallagher was appointed Minister of State at the Department of Marine from 12 March 1987 to 12 July 1988. He was appointed Minister of State at the Department of the Gaeltacht in July 1987, serving in that post until 11 February 1992 and again in the same post from 13 February 1992 until 12 January 1993. He was appointed Minister of State at the Department of the Arts, Culture and the Gaeltacht on 14 January 1993.

In 1994, he was elected to the European Parliament as an MEP for the Connacht–Ulster constituency, and was re-elected at the 1999 European Parliament election. During his period in Europe, Gallagher was a member of a number of committees including Fisheries, Economics and Monetary and Industry and Energy.

He returned to domestic politics to successfully contest the 2002 general election, and was appointed Minister of State at the Department of the Environment and Local Government in June 2002. In Taoiseach Bertie Ahern's reshuffle in 2004, he was appointed Minister of State at the Department of Environment and Local Government and at the Department of Communications, Marine and Natural Resources from 29 September 2004 to 14 February 2006. Following a period in this role, Gallagher was appointed as Minister of State at the Department of Transport from 14 February 2006 where he served until 14 June 2007. From 20 June 2007 to 12 May 2008, he served as Minister of State at the Department of Health and Children with special responsibility for Health Promotion and Food Safety. He was not re-appointed after Brian Cowen became Taoiseach in May 2008.

He was elected as an MEP for the North-West constituency at the 2009 European Parliament election. Immediately thereafter, Gallagher replaced Brian Crowley as the head of Fianna Fáil's European delegation; this promotion came in the aftermath of Crowley publicly attacking the party's decision to join the European Liberal Democrat and Reform Party. Gallagher was a member of the European Parliament's Committee on Fisheries.

Gallagher lost his seat at the 2014 European Parliament election.

In the 2016 general election, he ran alongside sitting TD Charlie McConalogue as the two Fianna Fáil candidates in the new five-seat Donegal constituency. Gallagher was elected on the 11th count, after McConalogue was elected on the first count. He lost his seat at the 2020 general election, with Pádraig Mac Lochlainn winning back the seat Gallagher had won at his expense in 2016.

In September 2024, Gallagher was selected to contest the 2024 general election for the Donegal constituency, along with Charlie McConalogue.

At the 2024 general election, Gallagher was elected to the Dáil. He is the oldest TD in the 34th Dáil.

Following Fianna Fáil's disastrous presidential election campaign in 2025, senior TDs Pat 'the Cope' Gallagher, Willie O'Dea and Seán Ó Fearghaíl issued a statement criticising the leadership's handling of the campaign and its aftermath, with reference to "the top-down autocratic style of politics" within the internal culture of the party.

Political offices
New office	Minister of State at the Department of the Marine; 1987–1989	Succeeded by Michael J. Noonan
Preceded by Denis Gallagher	Minister of State at the Department of the Gaeltacht; 1989–1994	Succeeded by Himself as Minister of State at the Department of Arts, Culture and the Gaeltacht
Preceded by Michael J. Noonan	Minister of State at the Department of the Marine; 1992–1993	Succeeded by Gerry O'Sullivan
Preceded by Himself as Minister of State at the Department of the Gaeltacht	Minister of State at the Department of Arts, Culture and the Gaeltacht; 1993–1994	Succeeded by Donal Carey
Preceded by Dan Wallace	Minister of State at the Department of the Environment, Heritage and Local Government; 2002–2004	Succeeded by Batt O'Keeffe
Preceded by John Browne	Minister of State at the Department of Communications, Marine and Natural Resources; 2004–2006	Succeeded by John Browne
Preceded by Ivor Callely	Minister of State at the Department of Transport; 2006–2007	Office vacant
Preceded by Seán Power	Minister of State at the Department of Health and Children; 2007–2008	Succeeded by Mary Wallace

Dáil	Election	Deputy (Party)	Deputy (Party)	Deputy (Party)
17th	1961	Joseph Brennan (FF)	Cormac Breslin (FF)	Patrick O'Donnell (FG)
18th	1965	Joseph Brennan (FF)	Cormac Breslin (FF)	Patrick O'Donnell (FG)
19th	1969	Constituency abolished. See Donegal–Leitrim		

Dáil	Election	Deputy (Party)	Deputy (Party)	Deputy (Party)
22nd	1981	Pat "the Cope" Gallagher (FF)	Clement Coughlan (FF)	James White (FG)
23rd	1982 (Feb)	Pat "the Cope" Gallagher (FF)	Clement Coughlan (FF)	Dinny McGinley (FG)
24th	1982 (Nov)	Pat "the Cope" Gallagher (FF)	Clement Coughlan (FF)	Dinny McGinley (FG)
24th	1983 by-election	Pat "the Cope" Gallagher (FF)	Cathal Coughlan (FF)	Dinny McGinley (FG)
25th	1987	Pat "the Cope" Gallagher (FF)	Mary Coughlan (FF)	Dinny McGinley (FG)
26th	1989	Pat "the Cope" Gallagher (FF)	Mary Coughlan (FF)	Dinny McGinley (FG)
27th	1992	Pat "the Cope" Gallagher (FF)	Mary Coughlan (FF)	Dinny McGinley (FG)
28th	1997	Tom Gildea (Ind.)	Mary Coughlan (FF)	Dinny McGinley (FG)
29th	2002	Pat "the Cope" Gallagher (FF)	Mary Coughlan (FF)	Dinny McGinley (FG)
30th	2007	Pat "the Cope" Gallagher (FF)	Mary Coughlan (FF)	Dinny McGinley (FG)
30th	2010 by-election	Pearse Doherty (SF)	Mary Coughlan (FF)	Dinny McGinley (FG)
31st	2011	Pearse Doherty (SF)	Thomas Pringle (Ind.)	Dinny McGinley (FG)
32nd	2016	Constituency abolished. See Donegal		

Dáil	Election	Deputy (Party)	Deputy (Party)	Deputy (Party)	Deputy (Party)	Deputy (Party)	Deputy (Party)	Deputy (Party)	Deputy (Party)
2nd	1921	Joseph O'Doherty (SF)	Samuel O'Flaherty (SF)	Patrick McGoldrick (SF)	Joseph McGinley (SF)	Joseph Sweeney (SF)	Peter Ward (SF)	6 seats 1921–1923	
3rd	1922	Joseph O'Doherty (AT-SF)	Samuel O'Flaherty (AT-SF)	Patrick McGoldrick (PT-SF)	Joseph McGinley (PT-SF)	Joseph Sweeney (PT-SF)	Peter Ward (PT-SF)	6 seats 1921–1923	
4th	1923	Joseph O'Doherty (Rep)	Peadar O'Donnell (Rep)	Patrick McGoldrick (CnaG)	Eugene Doherty (CnaG)	Patrick McFadden (CnaG)	Peter Ward (CnaG)	James Myles (Ind.)	John White (FP)
4th	1924 by-election	Joseph O'Doherty (Rep)	Peadar O'Donnell (Rep)	Patrick McGoldrick (CnaG)	Eugene Doherty (CnaG)	Patrick McFadden (CnaG)	Denis McCullough (CnaG)	James Myles (Ind.)	John White (FP)
5th	1927 (Jun)	Frank Carney (FF)	Neal Blaney (FF)	Daniel McMenamin (NL)	Eugene Doherty (CnaG)	Michael Óg McFadden (CnaG)	Hugh Law (CnaG)	James Myles (Ind.)	John White (FP)
6th	1927 (Sep)	Frank Carney (FF)	Neal Blaney (FF)	Archie Cassidy (Lab)	Eugene Doherty (CnaG)	Michael Óg McFadden (CnaG)	Hugh Law (CnaG)	James Myles (Ind.)	John White (FP)
7th	1932	Frank Carney (FF)	Neal Blaney (FF)	Brian Brady (FF)	Eugene Doherty (CnaG)	Daniel McMenamin (CnaG)	James Dillon (Ind.)	James Myles (Ind.)	John White (CnaG)
8th	1933	Joseph O'Doherty (FF)	Neal Blaney (FF)	Brian Brady (FF)	Hugh Doherty (FF)	Daniel McMenamin (CnaG)	James Dillon (NCP)	James Myles (Ind.)	Michael Óg McFadden (CnaG)
9th	1937	Constituency abolished. See Donegal East and Donegal West							

Dáil	Election	Deputy (Party)	Deputy (Party)	Deputy (Party)	Deputy (Party)	Deputy (Party)
21st	1977	Hugh Conaghan (FF)	Joseph Brennan (FF)	Neil Blaney (IFF)	James White (FG)	Paddy Harte (FG)
21st	1980 by-election	Hugh Conaghan (FF)	Clement Coughlan (FF)	Neil Blaney (IFF)	James White (FG)	Paddy Harte (FG)
22nd	1981	Constituency abolished. See Donegal North-East and Donegal South-West				

Dáil	Election	Deputy (Party)	Deputy (Party)	Deputy (Party)	Deputy (Party)	Deputy (Party)
32nd	2016	Pearse Doherty (SF)	Pat "the Cope" Gallagher (FF)	Thomas Pringle (Ind.)	Charlie McConalogue (FF)	Joe McHugh (FG)
33rd	2020	Pearse Doherty (SF)	Pádraig Mac Lochlainn (SF)	Thomas Pringle (Ind.)	Charlie McConalogue (FF)	Joe McHugh (FG)
34th	2024	Pearse Doherty (SF)	Pádraig Mac Lochlainn (SF)	Charles Ward (100%R)	Charlie McConalogue (FF)	Pat "the Cope" Gallagher (FF)
