= Paddy "the Cope" Gallagher =

Irish co-operator (1871–1966)

Paddy Gallagher
- Pádraig Ó Gallchóir
- Born: Patrick Gallagher; 25 December 1871; Cleendra, County Donegal, Ireland
- Died: 24 June 1966 (aged 94); Dungloe, County Donegal, Ireland
- Organization: Templecrone Agricultural Co-operative Society
- Movement: Co-operative
- Spouse: Sally Gallagher (m. 1898; died 1948)
- Relatives: Pat "the Cope" Gallagher (grandson)

Paddy "The Cope" Gallagher (Irish: Pádraig Ó Gallchóir; 25 December 1871 – 24 June 1966) was the founder of The Cope (officially called the Templecrone Agricultural Co-operative Society). A businessman and campaigner for West Donegal, he was born in Cleendra, Templecrone, part of The Rosses in the west of County Donegal, Ireland.

At an early age, he began work as a hired boy working as a farm labourer, first in County Donegal and then as a potato picker (or potato gatherer) in Scotland. It was this hard work, with its long hours and poor pay, he was later to say, that inspired him to found a cooperative movement back home in County Donegal. His co-op was opposed by local vested interests and he had to buy his own boats to do his importing. He also helped to coordinate the local fishing and textile co-operatives, allowing such workers to swap their produce for goods in his local co-operative shops. He wrote an autobiography, published in 1939, called Patrick Gallagher: My Story.

Gallagher was the grandfather of the politician Pat "the Cope" Gallagher. An image of Gallagher was featured on an Irish postage stamp issued in 2006.

== Bibliography ==
*Patrick Gallagher. My story with foreword by E.P. McDermott Dungloe; Templecrone Co-operative Society, [1944?]. 328 p. : ill. ; 21 cm.
