= Crolly =

Gaeltacht village in County Donegal, Ireland

Croithlí
- Village
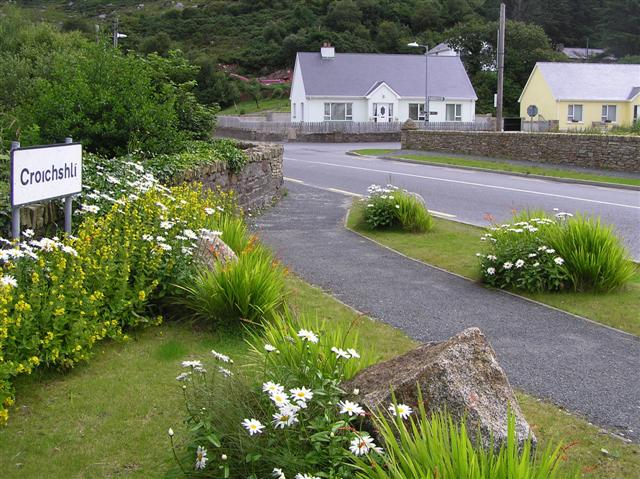
- Signage on the N56 at Crolly

- Location in Ireland
- Coordinates: 55°01′09″N 8°18′44″W
- Country: Ireland
- Province: Ulster
- County: County Donegal
- Baronies: Kilmacrenan and Boylagh

Government
  - Dáil Éireann: Donegal
- Elevation: 70 m (230 ft)
- Time zone: UTC+0 (WET)
  - Summer (DST): UTC-1 (IST (WEST))
- Irish Grid Reference: B808187
- Croithlí is the only official name. The anglicised spelling Crolly, which is still widely used, no longer has any official status.

Croithlí or Croichshlí (anglicised as Crolly) is a village in the Gaeltacht parishes and traditional districts of Gweedore (Gaoth Dobhair) and The Rosses (Na Rossan) in the west of County Donegal in Ulster, the northern province in Ireland. The two 'districts' are separated by the Crolly River (also known as the Gweedore River). It has one convenience shop/restaurant and petrol station and one public house, Páidí Óg's. Crolly is located in two baronies: the Gweedore part of the village is in the Barony of Kilmacrenan, while The Rosses part of the village is in the barony of Boylagh, the Crolly River being the boundary between the two baronies.

== Etymology ==
The official name of the village is Croithlí. This is taken to come from the Old Irish Craithlidh, meaning shaking bog or quagmire. Croichshlí, the less used spelling, means the hanging or crooked way. This most likely refers to how the road twists around the hills.

== Features ==
The village sits at the base of several large hills, among them Án Grógan Mór and Cnoc na bhFaircheach. These hills are remote and sparsely populated. They extend deep into The Rosses.

The Crolly Stone (known in Irish as Cloch Mhór Léim An tSionnaigh, or the Large Rock Of The Foxes Leap), an erratic left during the Ice Age, is reputed to be the largest boulder in Ireland.

The Crolly River, which flows from Loughanure to an estuary known locally as An Ghaoth, is known for its fishing. The Crolly Waterfall is also nearby. Crolly Bridge also indicates the point where the two parishes, and the two traditional districts, meet.

== Irish language ==
As the village is located on the border of The Rosses and Gaoth Dobhair, both districts within the West Donegal Gaeltacht, the Irish language is to be heard and most residents are bilingual. During the summer students stay in the village to learn Irish.

== Amenities ==
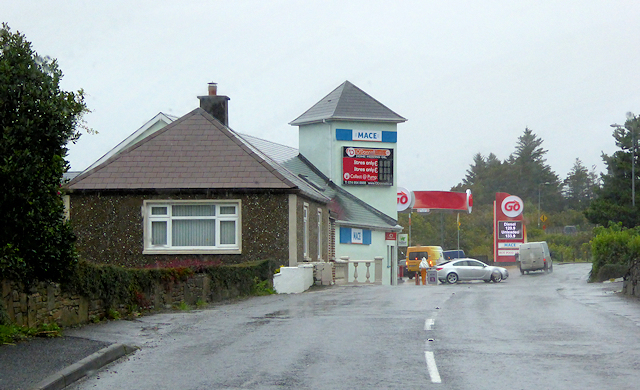
Petrol station in Crolly

There is one petrol station/shop (known locally as Stephen Anns) and one pub (Páidí Ógs) in the area. Leo's Tavern is a short walk from the village in the neighbouring townland of Meenaleck, with another pub, Teach Tessie, opposite the tavern. There are two caravan parks in the area and a glamping site is located near Leo's Tavern in Meenaleck.

Since 2018 there has been a local whiskey distillery called "Croithlí Distillery" located in the former Crolly factory.

There's one Catholic church, known locally as 'the Chapel', for the area located in Meenaweel. As there is no school in the village, children usually attend Scoil Phadraig Dobhair, in the townland of Dobhar, or Scoil Naomh Duigh in Anagaire.

== Crolly Dolls ==
The Crolly Factory opened in 1939, and started making the renowned Crolly Dolls. The early dolls were handmade with a soft-filled body, a strong head and arms and legs. Their clothes were made from local fabrics and knitted vestments. Soft toys for boys, like teddy bears, were also made at the factory.

The original factory closed in the 1970s. This was a major blow to the local economy. However, in 1993, the popularity of the dolls was recognised and a smaller company was reopened. The Crolly Doll is sold all over the world.

== Folklore ==
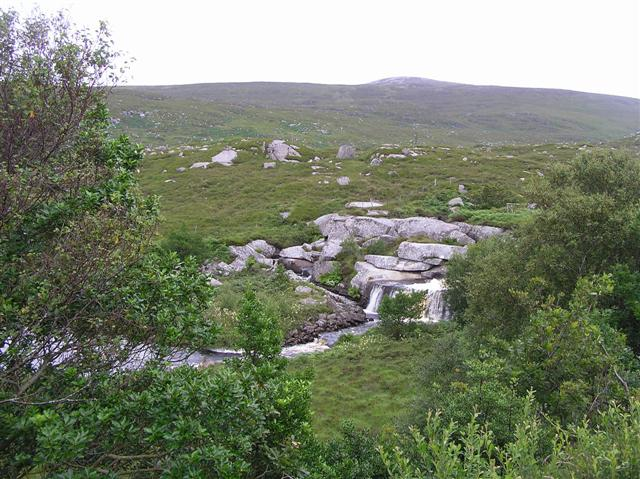
Crolly Waterfall

A large stone in the area, known as Cloch Mhór Léim An tSionnaigh, is referenced in the townland's folklore. The boulder's origin is attributed to Fionn mac Cumhaill who is reputed to have thrown it at Diarmuid and Grainne during his pursuit of them. In some versions, Diarmuid and Grainne are sleeping by the Crolly Waterfall and he misses, in others they are on top of Errigal and the stone bounces off the tip of the mountain. Another folktale suggests that, when the most beautiful (or sometimes reddest) girl in Ireland passes under the stone's shadow, it will topple. According to local legend, if one can successfully throw three stones on top of it, they are granted a wish.

== Monuments ==
In 2016, a 1916 monument was erected beside Paddy Ógs in Crolly by the Crolly Commemoration Committee commemorating both the 1916 Easter Rising and those who died during the War of Independence.

There is also a monument erected beside Leo's Tavern in Meenaleck for part-time resident and Provisional IRA Volunteer Caoimhín Mac Brádaigh, who was killed during the Milltown cemetery attack by loyalist Michael Stone on the 1988 Gibraltar Three funeral at Milltown cemetery in West Belfast.

== See also ==
- List of towns and villages in the Republic of Ireland
- List of populated places in the Republic of Ireland
- List of towns and villages in Northern Ireland
- Crolly railway station
