= Mullaghduff =

Mullaghduff may refer to:

- Mullaghduff, County Cavan
- Mullaghduff, County Donegal
