= Neil Plunkett Boyle =

Anti-Treaty IRA soldier (born 1898)

Neil 'Plunkett' Boyle
- Niall 'Pluincéad' Ó Baoighill
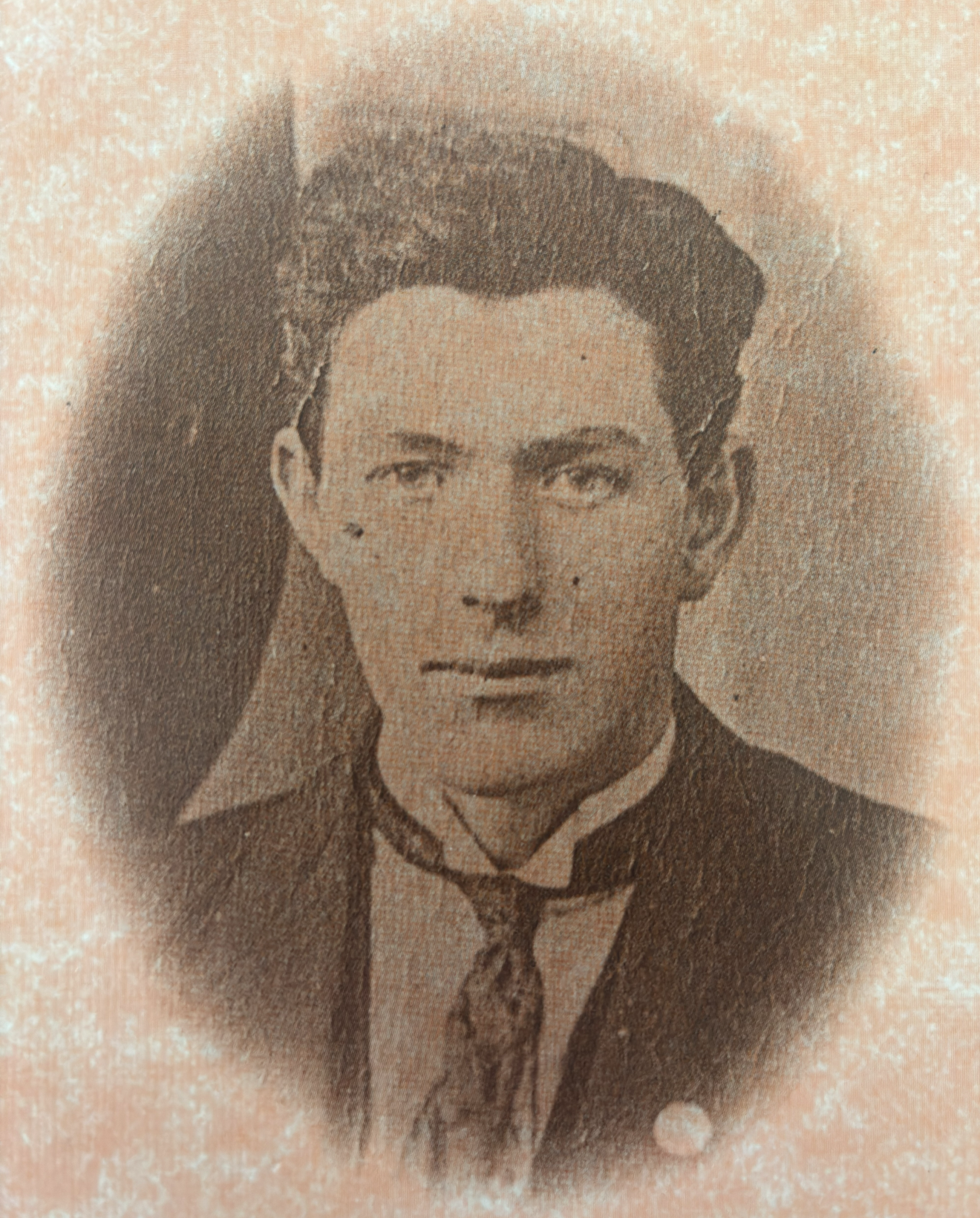
- Born: Neil Boyle; 1898; Lackenagh, County Donegal, Ireland
- Died: 15 May 1923 (aged 24–25); Knocknadruce, County Wicklow, Ireland
- Cause of death: Summary execution
- Burial place: Kincasslagh graveyard
- Military career
- Paramilitaries: Irish Republican Army (1919–1922); Anti-Treaty IRA (1922–1923)
- Rank: Commandant
- Nicknames: Plunkett, Ned
- Units: B Company, 2nd Battalion, 1st Scottish Brigade (1919–1922); 3rd Battalion, 2nd Dublin Brigade (1922–1923)
- Conflicts: Irish War of Independence; Irish Civil War

Neil 'Plunkett' Boyle (Irish: Niall Pluincéad Ó Baoighill; 1898 – 15 May 1923) was a commandant in the Anti-Treaty IRA from County Donegal.

== Early life ==
Boyle was born in Lackenagh, near Burtonport, County Donegal, in 1898. His interest in Irish history, particularly Joseph Plunkett in the 1916 Easter Rising, gained him the nickname 'Plunkett'. Boyle's father died when he was 19, and his mother was a devout Irish nationalist who influenced him greatly.

In 1919, aged 21, Boyle left his job on the Lough Swilly Railway after run-ins with the Royal Irish Constabulary (RIC) due to the Irish Transport and General Workers' Union (IGTWU) position of refusing to carry British forces at the time. As a result of this, he moved to Newmains in Scotland to work in a coal mine in Stepps outside Glasgow.

== Military career ==
While in Newmains, he joined B Company, 2nd Battalion, Scottish No. 1 Brigade of the Irish Republican Army (IRA). In his role in the Scottish Brigade of the IRA, he was involved in procuring and transporting weapons to the IRA in Ireland. In 1920, he was apprehended by police and charged with possession of explosives, for which he was sentenced to five years penal servitude in Peterhead Prison. In 1922, he was released as part of an amnesty in the Anglo-Irish Treaty and returned to County Donegal.

Following the treaty, Boyle joined the Anti-Treaty IRA in the ensuing Irish Civil War. Several months after his return to Ireland, he was arrested again and imprisoned in an internment camp in Newbridge, County Kildare. He escaped from the camp in October 1922, using a sewage drain, and escaped to Dublin. In Dublin, Boyle was appointed commandant of the 3rd Battalion, Dublin No. 2 Brigade and took up duty in County Wicklow in November that year.

== Death ==
Despite a ceasefire order in April 1923, Boyle and his flying column were surrounded at a safe house in Knocknadruce near Valleymount in the Wicklow Mountains by the National Army on 15 May 1923. While they were surrendering, Boyle was summarily executed, being the last member of the IRA to be killed during the civil war. He is buried in Kincasslagh graveyard.

In 2022, a memorial was erected in Mullaghduff, County Donegal to commemorate the Anti-Treaty 'Rosses Martyrs', consisting of him and three others (Owen Boyle and Captain Con Boyle of the IRA and Mary McBride of Cumann na mBan).
