= The Cope =

Consumer co-operative in Ireland

- Type: Consumer co-operative
- Industry: Shopping Centre
- Founded: 1906
- Headquarters: Dungloe, County Donegal, Ireland
- Revenue: €16 Million
- Number of employees: 110
- Website: TheCope.ie

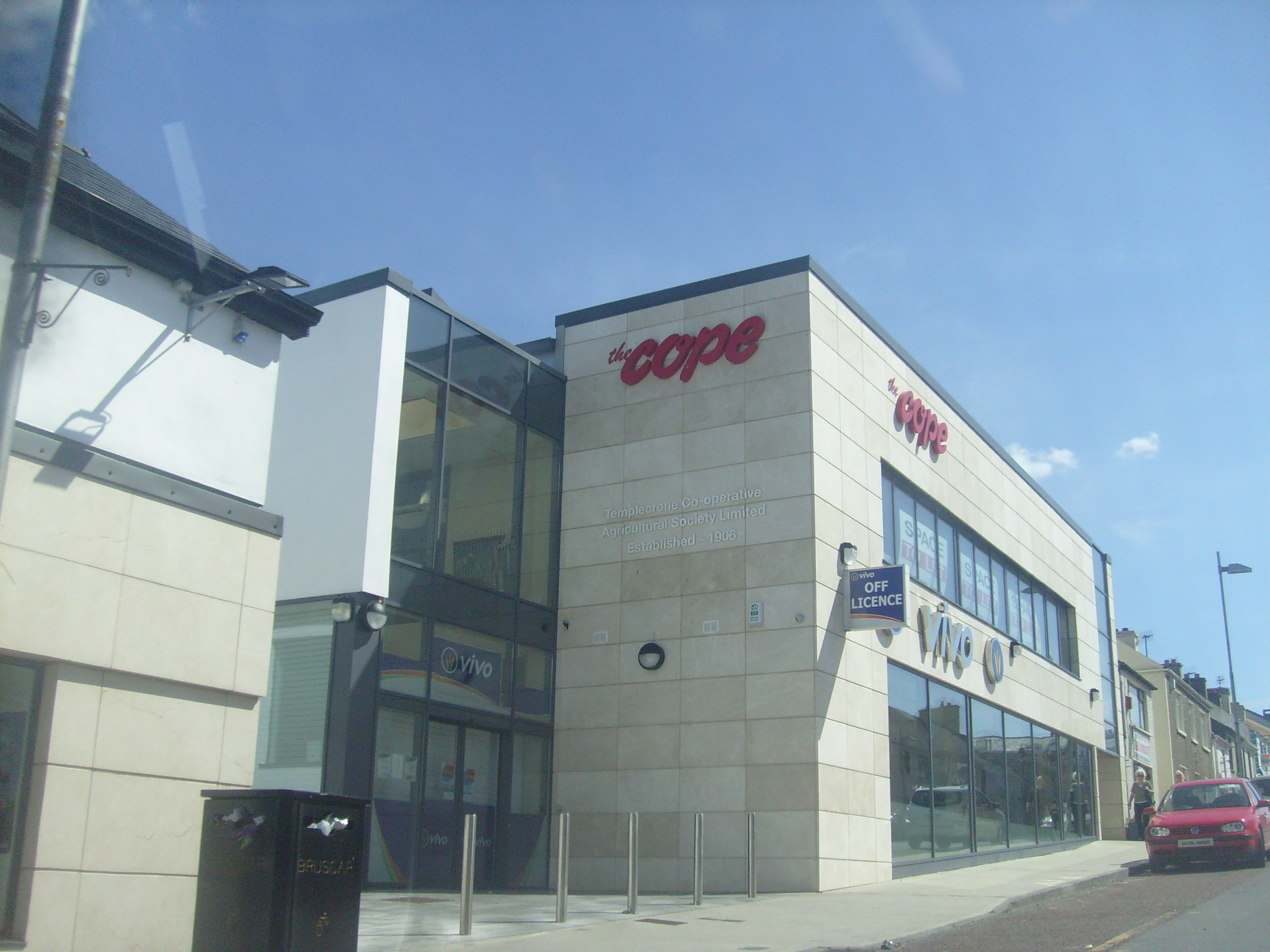
The main Cope store, in Dungloe, County Donegal.

The Cope, or the Templecrone Agricultural Co-operative Society is a co-operative retail chain indigenous to The Rosses area of County Donegal in Ireland. Founded in 1906, it has a number of normal supermarkets as well as a full department store, a builders merchants and an agricultural division.

The name comes from the inability of one of the founder shareholders to say Co-Op - as he could pronounce Cope, the name The Cope was adopted. For the same reason, some people use the term to refer to the group in the U.K. named The Co-operative Group.

Outside of Donegal, the name is perhaps best known for being the semi-official nickname of a local politician Pat "the Cope" Gallagher, who is a former Minister of State. His family were connected to the foundation of the co-operative. The founder of the chain, Patrick Gallagher (grandfather of the above, and known as Paddy "the Cope"), featured on a 48c Irish stamp released on 16 January 2006, depicted in front of the group's first Dungloe store.

The supermarket section of its flagship Dungloe department store was destroyed in a fire in April 2006, although a reduced supermarket service was resumed within two weeks from elsewhere on the site. Construction of a new supermarket began in January 2007 and has since been completed. Initially co-branded as a Vivo store, and latterly a Eurospar, it has since returned to only Cope branding.

The Cope has branches in the town of Dungloe, as well as Annagry, Falcarragh and Kincasslagh villages. They formerly had branches in Burtonport and Narin, but they have been closed; with the former branch in Lettermacaward now operated privately. The Narin branch was re-opened on its original site for Summer 2019 only.

The Dungloe store is a full service department store, with the Falcarragh branch also carrying some homewares and hardware in addition to the food business. The Dungloe and Kincasslagh stores host the An Post post office for their communities, while the separate Dungloe hardware/agricultural store carries Topline Hardware franchise branding.
