= Lough Anure =

Lake in County Donegal, Ireland

- Loch an Iúir (Irish)
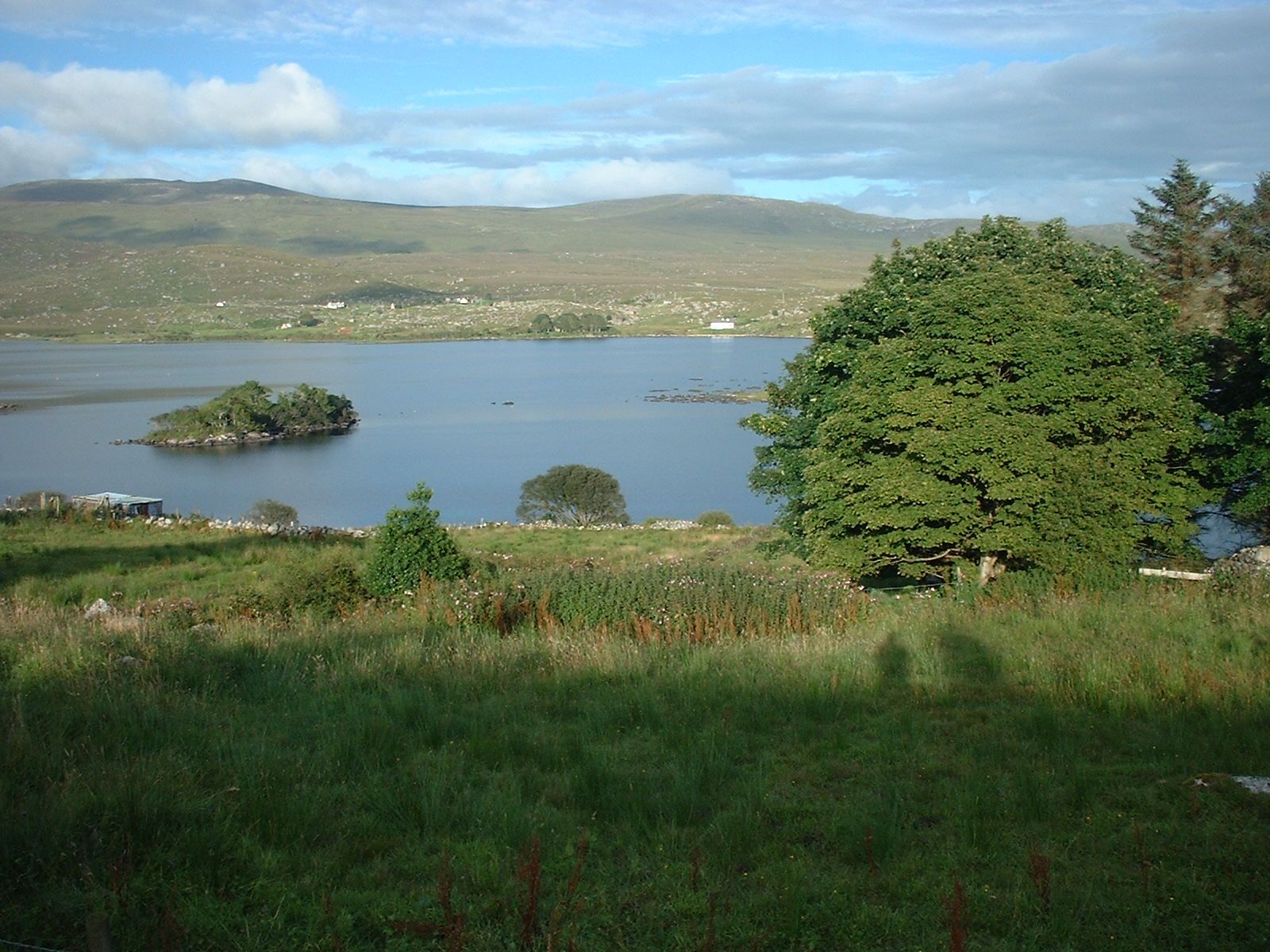

- Location in Ireland
- Location: County Donegal
- Coordinates: 54.996°N 8.282°W
- Primary outflows: River Crolly
- Catchment area: 37.29 km^{2} (14.4 sq mi)
- Basin countries: Ireland
- Surface area: 1.59 km^{2} (0.61 sq mi)
- Average depth: 2 m (7 ft)
- Max. depth: 12 m (39 ft)
- Surface elevation: 36 m (118 ft)
- Islands: Trairagh

Lough Anure (Irish: Loch an Iúir, meaning 'lake of the yew') is a freshwater lake in the northwest of County Donegal, Ireland.

== Geography and hydrology ==
Lough Anure is about 8 kilometres (5 mi) northeast of Dungloe. It is the largest lake in the Rosses region of the county. The lake drains to the north via the River Crolly (also known as the Gweedore River).

== Natural history ==
Fish species in Lough Anure include brown trout, common minnow, salmon and the critically endangered European eel. Brown trout are the most abundant. Salmon are not always present in the lake and the 2020 fish stock survey recorded only a single specimen.

== See also ==
- List of loughs in Ireland
