= Lough Meela =

Lake in County Donegal, Ireland

- Loch Míle (Irish)
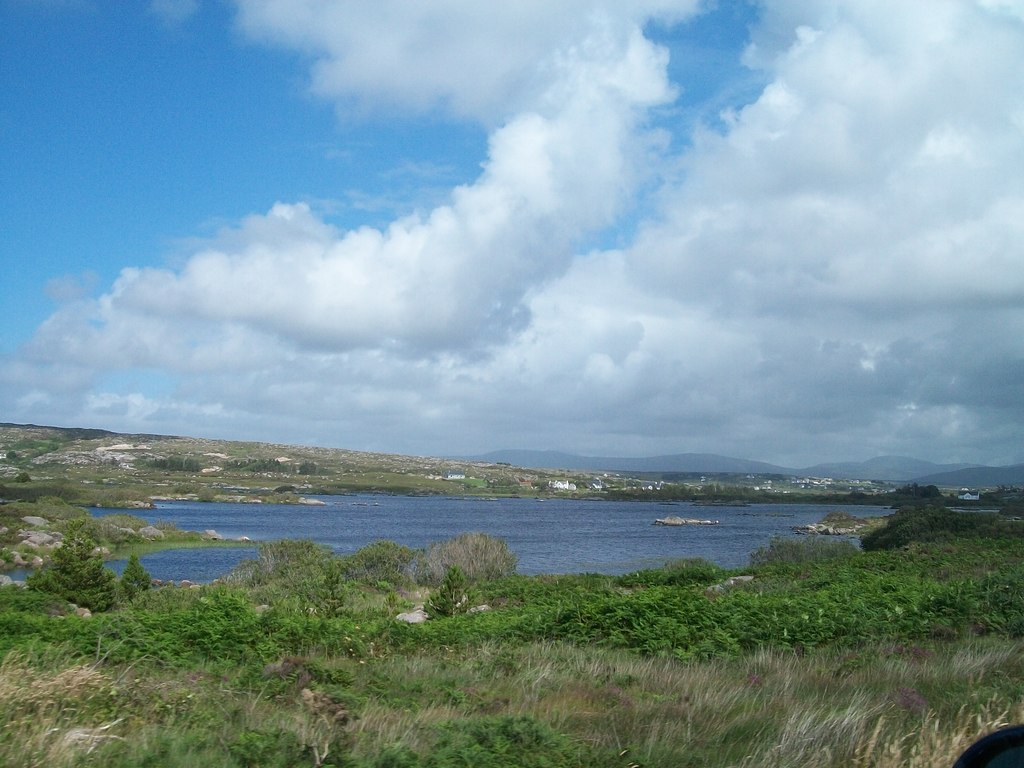

- Location in Ireland
- Location: County Donegal
- Coordinates: 54°57′58″N 8°24′13″W
- Catchment area: 9.52 km^{2} (3.7 sq mi)
- Basin countries: Ireland
- Max. length: 1.2 km (1 mi)
- Max. width: 0.6 km (0.4 mi)
- Surface area: 0.57 km^{2} (0.22 sq mi)
- Surface elevation: 3 m (9.8 ft)
- Islands: 2

Lough Meela (Irish: Loch Míle) is a freshwater lake in the northwest of Ireland. It is located in The Rosses area of County Donegal.

== Geography ==
Lough Meela is located about 5 kilometres (3 mi) northwest of Dungloe and 3 km (2 mi) southeast of Burtonport, on the R259 road. It measures about 1 km (0.6 mi) long north–south and 0.5 km (0.3 mi) wide.

== Natural history ==
Fish species in Lough Meela include sea trout, brown trout and flounder. The lake is part of The Rosses Fishery.

== See also ==
- List of loughs in Ireland
