= The Rosses =

Region of western County Donegal, Ireland

Coordinates: 54°59′04″N 8°24′33″W

The Rosses Na Rosa
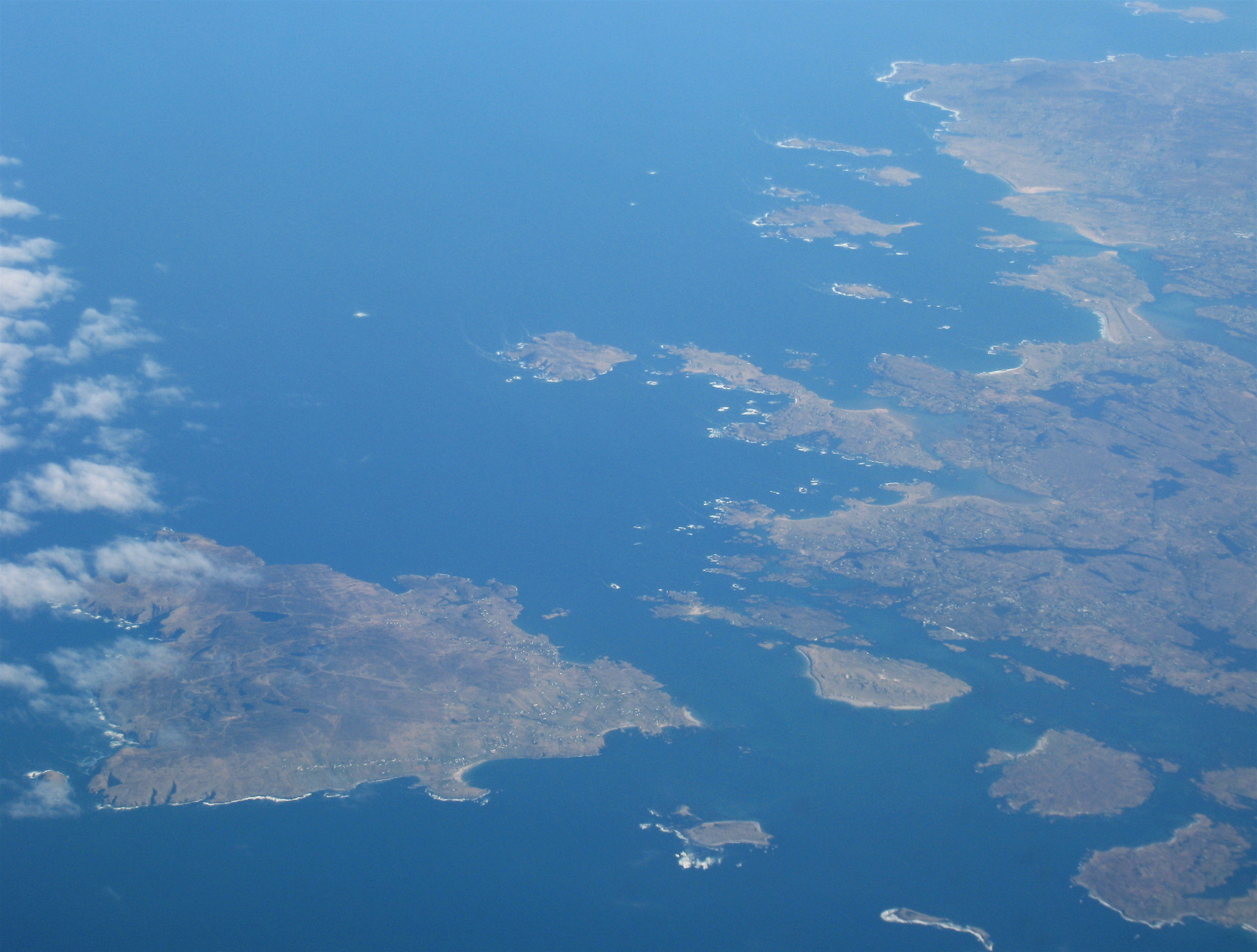
- Aerial view of the northwest of the Rosses

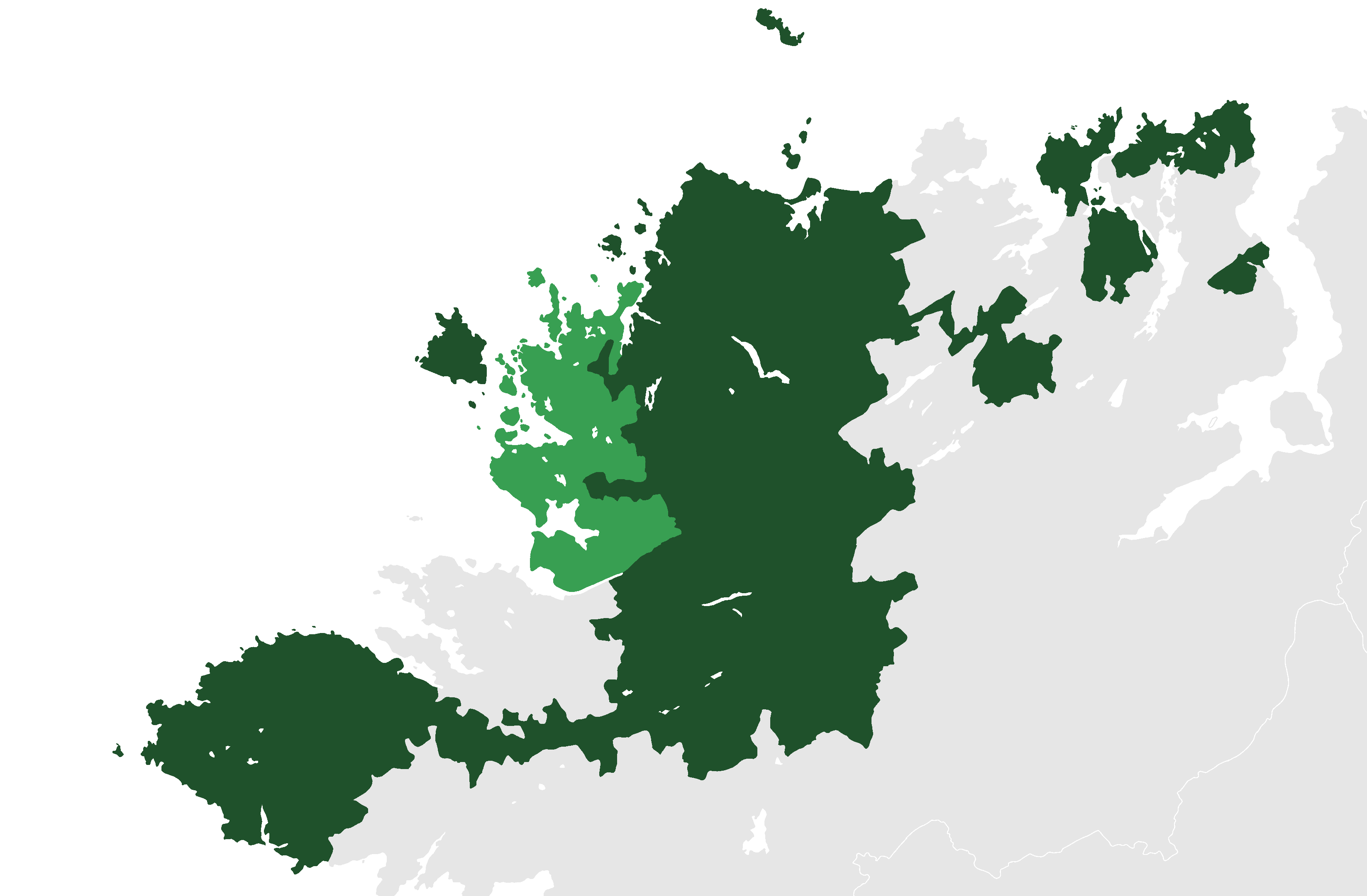
- Coordinates: 54.96792, -8.34724
- Country: Ireland
- Province: Ulster
- County: County Donegal
- Barony: Boylagh
- Principal settlement: Dungloe

Government
  - Local authority: Donegal CC
  - Local electoral area: Glenties
  - Dáil constituency: Donegal
  - EP constituency: Midlands–North-West

Area
  - Total: 314 km^{2} (121 sq mi)
- Time zone: UTC±0 (WET)
  - Summer (DST): UTC+1 (IST)
- Eircode routing keys: F94 (primarily)
- Telephone area codes: 074

The Rosses (officially known by its Irish language name, Na Rosa; in the genitive case Na Rosann) is a traditional district in the west of County Donegal, Ireland. The Rosses has a population of over 7,000 centred on the town of Dungloe, which acts as the educational, shopping and civic centre for the area. Defined by physical boundaries in the form of rivers, as well as history and language use, the area has a distinctive identity, separate from the rest of County Donegal. The extensive district lies between the parish and district of Gweedore to the north and the town of Glenties to the south. A large part of the Rosses is in the Gaeltacht (Irish-speaking region). The Rosses, Cloughaneely and Gweedore, known locally as "the three parishes", with 16,000 Irish speakers, together form a social and cultural region different from the rest of the county, with Gweedore serving as the main centre for socialising and industry. Gaeltacht an Láir is another Irish-speaking area.

== Irish language ==
The following is a list of electoral divisions in the area with the percentage that speak Irish:

1. An Clochán Liath (1,785) (15%)
2. Anagaire (2,138) (55%)
3. Árainn Mhór (529) (62%)
4. Inis Mhic an Doirn (1,410) (9%)
5. An Duchoraidh (78) (34%)
6. Leitir Mhic an Bhaird (650) (19%)
7. An Machaire (615) (15%)
8. Cro Bheithe (170) (60%)

== Culture ==
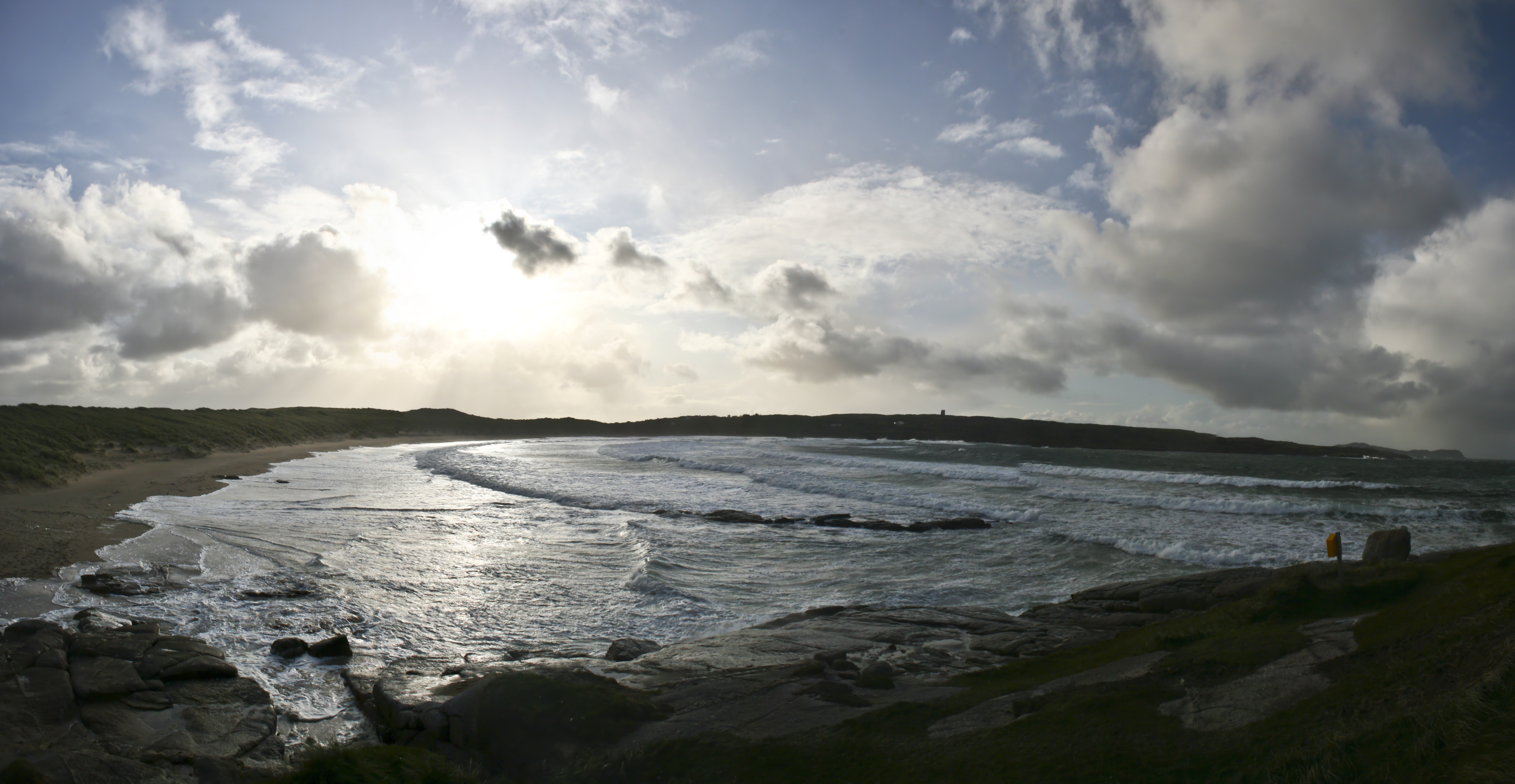
Mullaghderg Beach, the Rosses

Once a predominantly Irish-speaking area, over recent generations English has become increasingly common. Irish is still used extensively in some areas including parts of the island of Arranmore, the townland of Ranafast and the village of Annagry. In some areas, like the hills around Dungloe, around Loughanure and in pockets of Doochary and Lettermacaward, the Irish language is predominant.

The area fields a number of sports teams, both in soccer and Gaelic football. Keadue Rovers from the lower Rosses have traditionally been the area's strongest soccer team, and there are also teams in Arranmore (Arranmore United F.C.) and in Maghery (Strand Rovers F.C.). An Clochán Liath have traditionally been the strongest in Gaelic football, winning seven County Championships between 1930 and 1958. There are also teams in Mullaghderg (Naomh Muire), and in Lettermacaward (Na Rossa).

There is a strong tradition of songwriting in the area, Seán McBride (1906–1996) from Cruit Island wrote the popular song "The Homes of Donegal".

There are connections between the people of the Rosses and Scotland, Glasgow in particular, due to the economic need for emigration in the past and the strong ties forged over the generations as a result. Many people from the Rosses, in common with people from other parts of County Donegal, have also settled in the City of Derry, especially since the late 1840s.

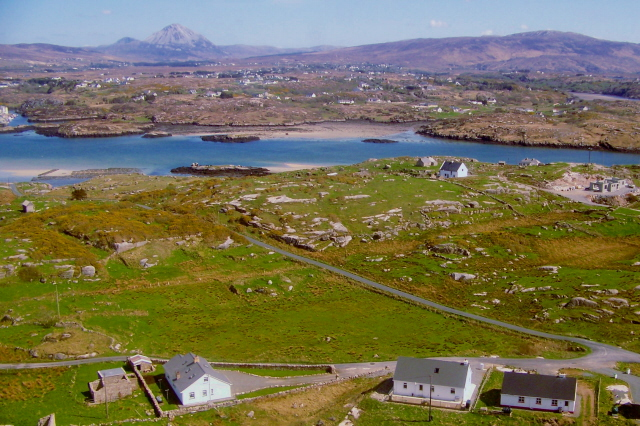
An aerial view of Carrickfin and Ranafast, with Errigal in the background

== Geography ==
The area is bounded by the River Gweebarra to the south, the Gweedore River (known locally as the Crolly River) to the north, the Derryveagh Mountains and the Gweebarra River (Doochary Bridge) to the east and the Atlantic Ocean to the west. The name comes from "Ros", the Irish word for headland. The area presents a rocky barren landscape, studded with a myriad of lakes and inlets of the sea. Lakes include Lough Anure, Lough Craghy, Dunglow Lough and Lough Meela.

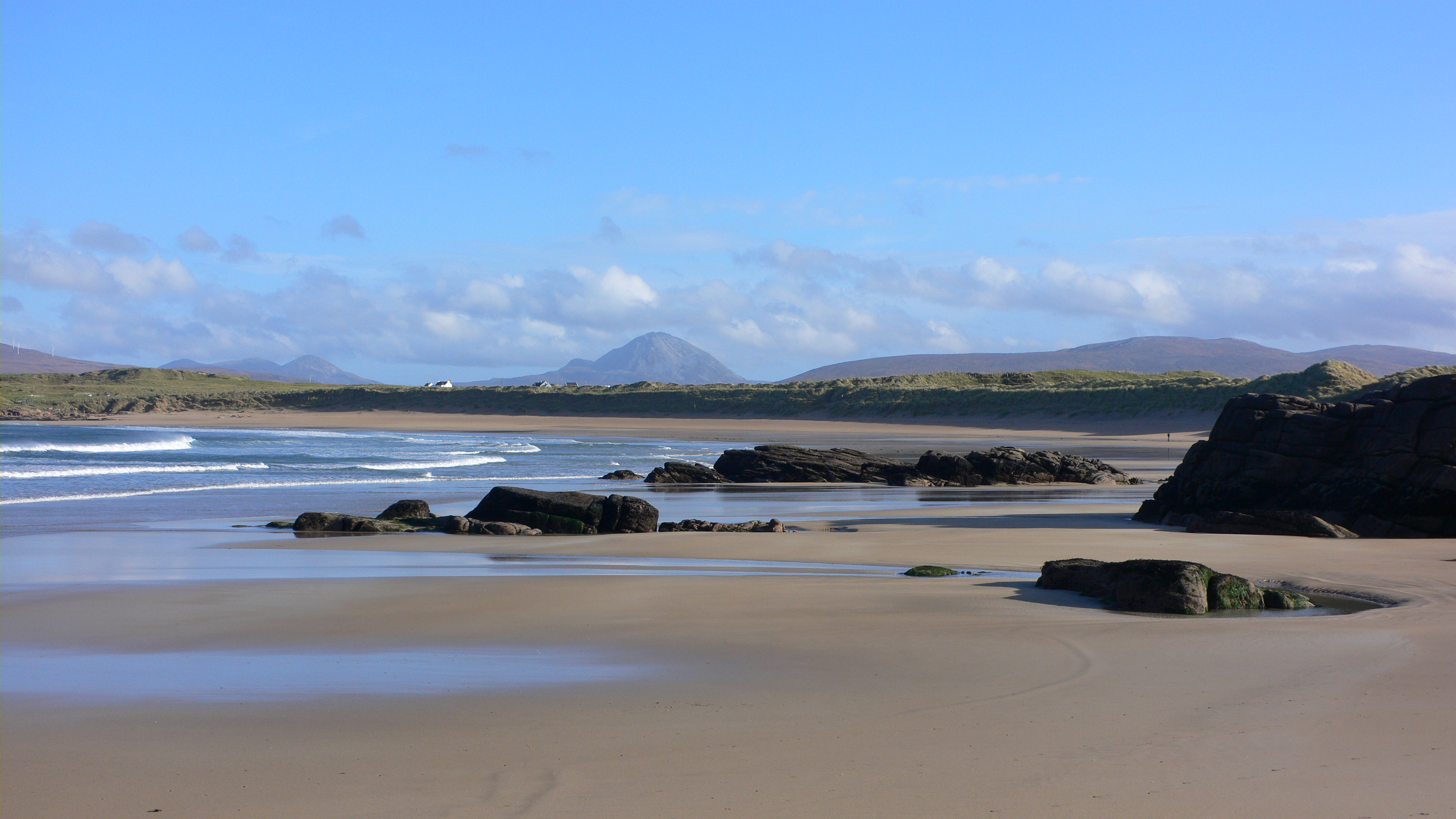
Mullaghderg beach

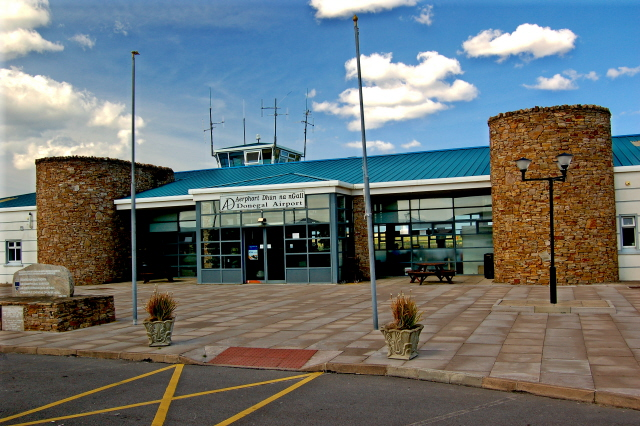
Donegal International Airport

== Transport ==
County Donegal's only airport is in the Rosses at Carrickfinn. The district's principal roads are the N56 and R259.

== History ==
The Rosses has been inhabited since ancient times, and the church of St Crona in Termon near Dungloe has been dated to the 6th century AD. It was the site of a monastery founded by St. Crona, a cousin of the Royal Saint called Columcille, founder of the monastic settlement at Iona, and was the centre of the parish of Templecrone.

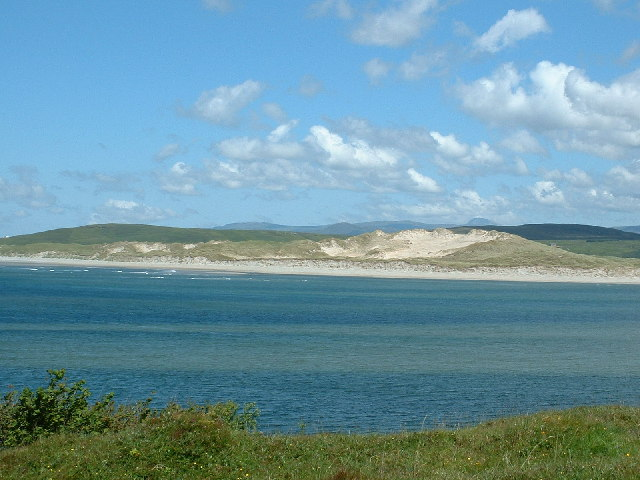
Sand dunes near Leitir

In the late 1580s, a number of ships from the Spanish Armada sank off or landed off its coast.

== Economy ==
Historically the Rosses has relied heavily on hospitality, tourism and the fishing industry as the mainstays of its economy. The area has its own indigenous supermarket chain called The Cope which has been quite successful. There is very little manufacturing industry in the Rosses apart from a few companies located in Dungloe.

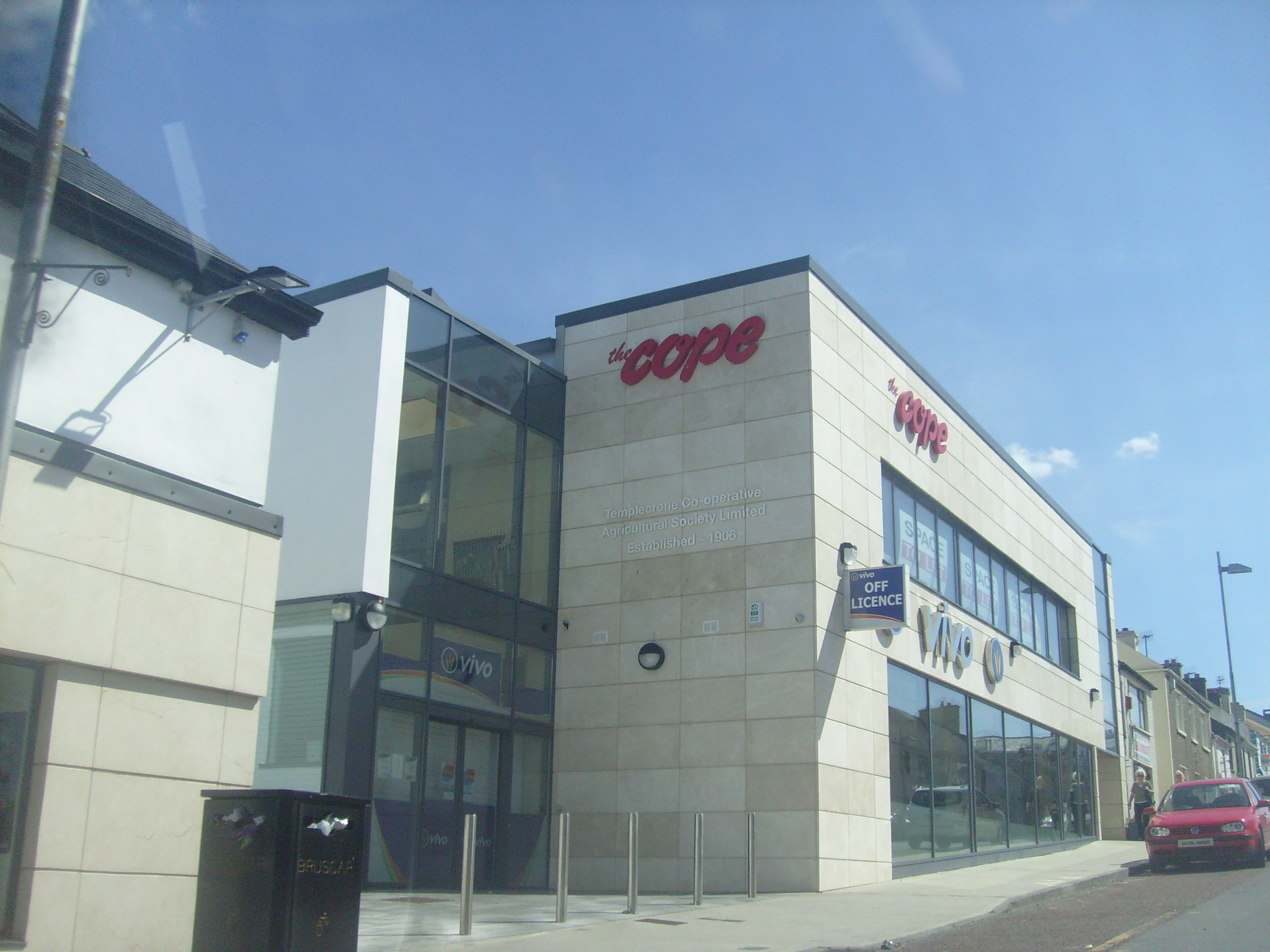
The Cope is a cooperative indigenous to the area, with two major stores in Dungloe (one of which is pictured) and several others around other parts of the Rosses.

== Tourism ==
The area claims a large proportion of Donegal's tourist income, due to its renowned scenery and its many festivals, including the Mary From Dungloe International Festival. There is a very strong tradition of marching bands emanating from the region; the area boasts many All-Ireland championship bands in all grades and disciplines.

== Notable people ==
- Declan Bonner, member of 1992 All-Ireland winning Donegal team
- Packie Bonner, former Ireland and Celtic goalkeeper
- Neil Plunkett Boyle, Irish revolutionary and Military commander
- Tony Boyle, 1992 All Star and member of 1992 All-Ireland winning Donegal team
- Joseph Duffy, UFC mixed martial artist
- Pat "the Cope" Gallagher, former TD and former MEP
- Adrian Hanlon, member of 2012 All-Ireland winning Donegal panel
- Seosamh Mac Grianna, author
- Carl McHugh, footballer for Motherwell
- Niall Ó Dónaill, lexicographer
- Daniel O'Donnell, singer
- Margo, singer
- Peadar O'Donnell, socialist and author
- Séamus Ó Grianna, author
- Adrian Sweeney, 2003 All Star footballer
- Joseph Sweeney, 1916 rising veteran, Irish Revolutionary, Military Commander, former TD

=== Bands ===
- Goats Don't Shave, folk band
- Skara Brae, folk band

== Townlands ==
- Acres
- Annagry (Anagaire)
- Arlands
- Belcruit
- Braade (An Bhráid)
- Burtonport (Ailt an Chorráin)
- Carrickfinn (Carraig Fhinne or Carraig Fhinn)
- Cloughlass
- Crickamore
- Crolly (Croithlí, half of which is situated in Gweedore)
- Derrynamansher (Doire na Mainséar)
- Doochary (An Dúchoraidh)
- Drumnacart Mountain Pasture
- Dungloe (An Clochán Liath)
- Keadue (Céideadh)
- Kerrytown
- Kincasslagh (Cionn Caslach)
- Lackenagh
- Lettermacaward/Leitir (Leitir Mhic an Bhaird)
- Loughanure (Loch an Iúir)
- Maghery (An Mhachaire)
- Meenagowan (Min A Ghabhann)
- Meenaleck
- Meenbanad
- Mullaghduff (Mullach Dubh)
- Ranafast (Rann na Feirste)
- Roshine
- Tullyillion

== Islands ==
- Arranmore (Árainn Mhór)
- Cruit (An Chruit)
- Eighter (An tÍochtar)
- Inishal (Inis Saille)
- Inishcoo (Inis Cú)
- Inishfree (Inis Fraoigh)
- Inishkeeragh (Inis Caorach)
- Owey (Oileán Uaighe)
- Rutland (Inis Mhic an Doirn)
