= Mullaghduff, County Donegal =

Gaeltacht townland in County Donegal, Ireland

Mullaghduff An Mullach Dubh
- Townland
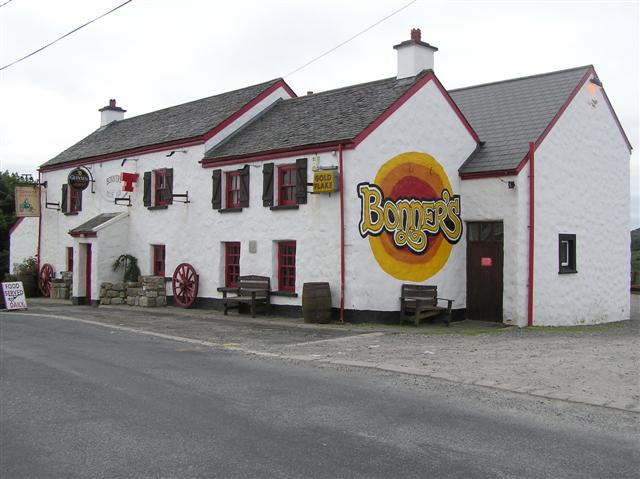
- Bonner's Bar pub in Mullaghduff

- Location in Ireland
- Coordinates: 55°02′13″N 8°20′26″W
- Country: Ireland
- Province: Ulster
- County: County Donegal

Government
  - Dáil Éireann: Donegal
  - EU Parliament: Midlands–North-West
- Time zone: UTC+0 (WET)
  - Summer (DST): UTC-1 (IST (WEST))
- Area codes: 074 95, +000 353 74 95
- Irish Grid Reference: B777203

Mullaghduff (Irish: An Mullach Dubh) is a townland in northwest County Donegal, Ireland. It forms part of the greater Rosses region and is officially in the Gaeltacht, however, English is the predominantly spoken language today.

== Etymology ==
The name Mullaghduff is an anglicisation of the Irish placename 'An Mullach Dubh', which means 'The Black Hilltop'; which possibly derives from the blackish soil which covers the nearby hills.

== Music and sport ==
Mullaghduff is home to the marching band Buíonn Cheoil Mhullach Dubh (Mullaghduff Band), founded in 1881, which includes the "Old Band" and the "Wee Band" founded 1986 with their first appearance on St Patricks day 1988. They have won the All Ireland Fleadh – Marching Band Competition fourteen times.

Mullaghduff is also home to Glasgow Celtic's first sod of turf, which was cut in April 1995 and placed in Celtic Park. In June 1996, a small plaque which is along the road was unveiled by Celtic Captain Paul McStay.

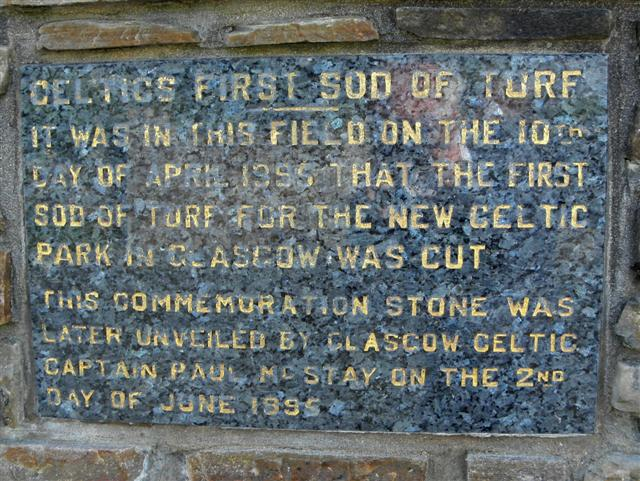
Commemorative plaque for the sod of turf taken from Mullaghduff for Celtic Park.

== Memorials ==
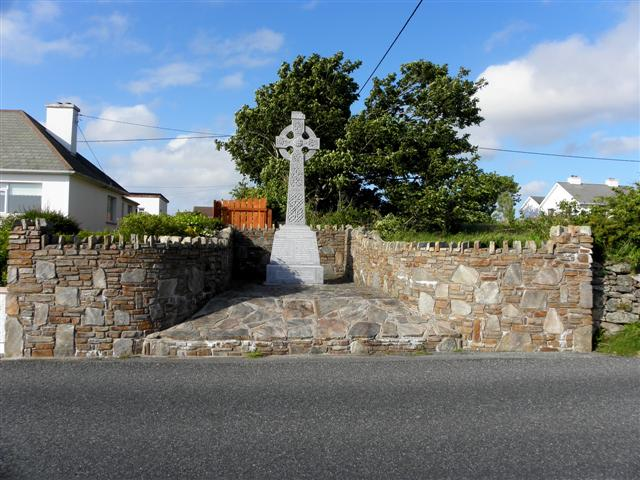
Memorial for the Ballymanus Mine Disaster in Mullaghduff

There is a memorial near to the Community Centre dedicated to 14 young men killed in the 1943 Ballymanus Mine Disaster, when local men aided by young teenagers attempted to bring an unexploded naval mine ashore the nearby beach when it exploded after hitting a rock.

In 2022, a memorial was erected at Mullaghduff Community Centre to commemorate the 100th anniversary of 3 IRA members (Neil Plunkett O'Boyle, Owen Boyle and Con Boyle) and 1 Cumann na mBan member (Mary McBride) from the area, coined the 'Rosses Martyrs', that fought in the Irish War of Independence and then either died or were killed during the Irish Civil War. Neil Plunkett O'Boyle was the last Anti-Treaty IRA member to be killed during the civil war

== Religion ==
The predominant religion in Mullaghduff is Roman Catholicism and it is part of the parish of Kincasslagh. The nearest churches that serve parishioners are St. Mary's Church in Kincasslagh and St. Mary's Star of the Sea in Annagry.
