= Coláiste Bhríde =

- Rann na Feirste; County Donegal; Ireland

Information
- Established: 1912; 113 years ago
- Key people: Lorcan Ó Muireadhaigh
- Language: Irish

Coláiste Bhríde is an Irish language college in Rann na Feirste, County Donegal. It was originally founded in 1912 in Omeath but Fr Lorcán Ó Muireadhaigh moved it to the Donegal Gaeltacht in August 1926.

People to have visited or attended the college include Phil Coulter, Éamon de Valera, Bernadette Devlin McAliskey, Paul Brady, Pádraig MacNamee, Tomás Ó Fiaich and T. K. Whitaker.

RTÉ Raidió na Gaeltachta aired a special programme about the college in May 2020, with the college breaking from 94 years of opening at its Donegal headquarters due to the COVID-19 pandemic.
