= Lettermacaward =

Gaeltacht village in County Donegal, Ireland

Leitir Mhic an Bhaird
- Village
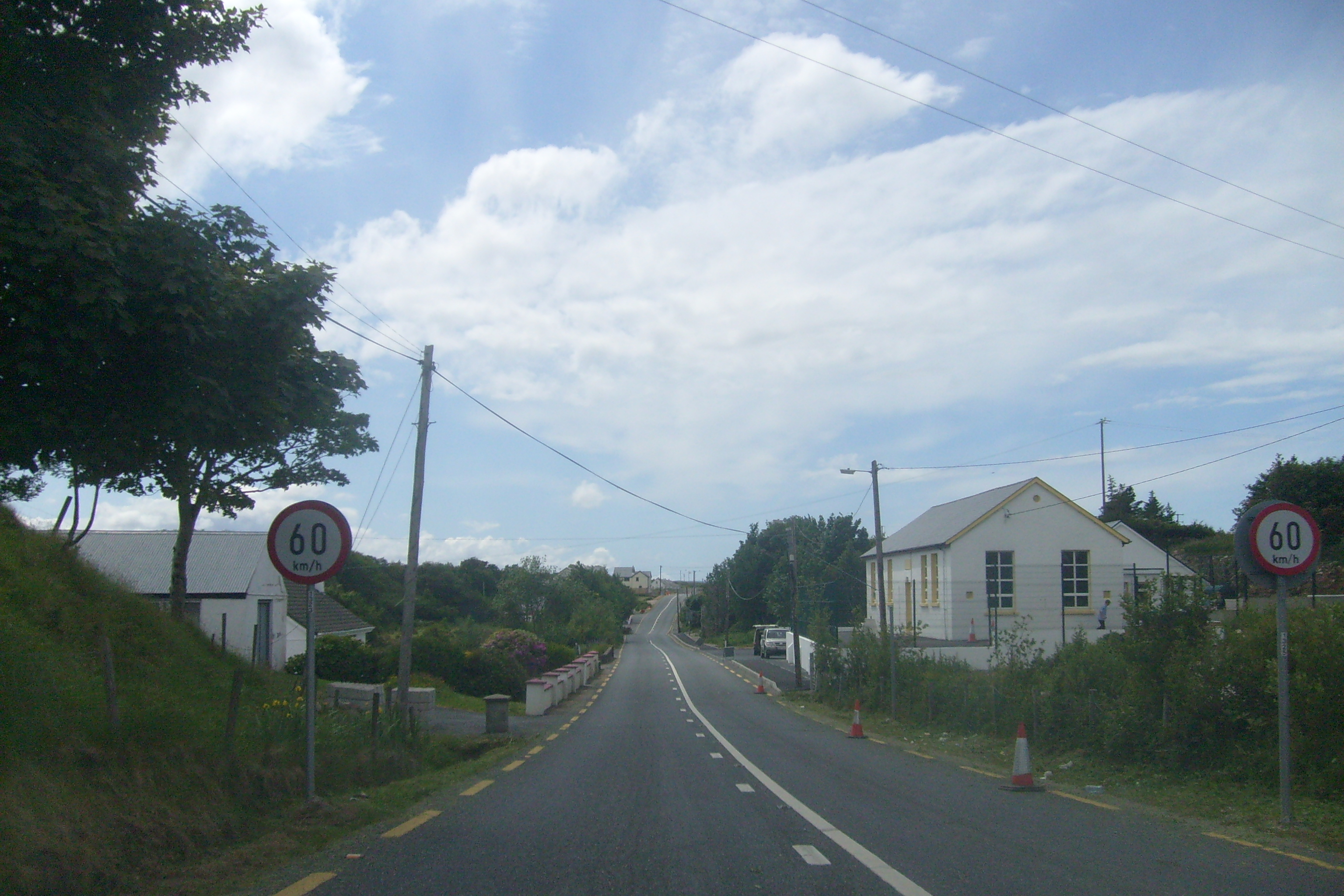

- Location in Ireland
- Coordinates: 54°51′20″N 8°18′33″W
- Country: Ireland
- Province: Ulster
- County: County Donegal
- Elevation: 78 m (256 ft)
- Irish Grid Reference: G818944
- Leitir Mhic an Bhaird is the only official name. The anglicized spelling Lettermacaward has no official status.

Leitir Mhic an Bhaird or Leitir Mhic a' Bhaird (anglicised as Lettermacaward) is a Gaeltacht village in the Rosses region of County Donegal, Ireland. The village, known colloquially as Leitir (pronounced letcher), is between the larger towns of Glenties and Dungloe. It is also a civil parish in the historic barony of Boylagh. The village has two shops, a family run service station and three 3 pubs.

== Irish language ==
There are approximately 650 people living in the Leitir Mhic an Bhaird ED and 19% Irish speakers.

== Sport ==
The local Gaelic games club is Na Rossa.

== Civil parish of Lettermacaward ==
The civil parish contains the village of Lettermacaward.

=== Townlands ===
The civil parish contains the following townlands:

- Befflaght
- Bellanaboy (also known as Derrynacarrow East)
- Boyoughter
- Commeen
- Cor
- Derryleconnell Far
- Derryleconnell Near
- Derrynacarrow
- Derrynacarrow East (also known as Bellanaboy)
- Derrynagrial
- Derrynanaspol
- Dooey
- Farragans
- Galwolie
- Glebe
- Longfield
- Madavagh
- Meenacarn
- Meenagowan
- Ranny
- Stranasaggart
- Toome

== See also ==
- List of populated places in Ireland
