= Alexander Campbell (suspected Molly Maguire) =

Irish tavern owner and criminal (died 1877)

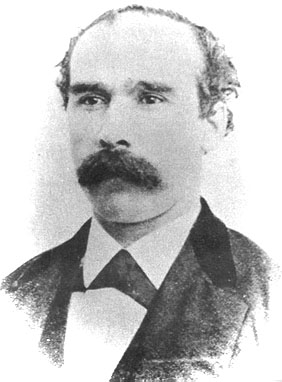
- Alexander Campbell
- Born: c. 1833; Dungloe, County Donegal, Ireland
- Died: 1877 (aged 43–44); Mauch Chunk, Pennsylvania, U.S.
- Cause of death: Execution by hanging

Alexander Campbell (c. 1833 – June 21, 1877) was a tavern owner, who, with three other convicted Molly Maguires, was hanged for the murders of two mine operatives.

Campbell proclaimed his innocence to the end, and in doing so, slapped a muddy handprint on the wall of his prison cell, declaring the mark would remain forever as a sign of his innocence. Legend has it that despite many attempts to remove it, including building a new wall, the mark still remains today.

== Life ==
Campbell was born in Dungloe, County Donegal, Ireland around 1833. In 1868, he emigrated to the United States, where he began operating a tavern in the eastern Pennsylvania town of Tamaqua. Campbell later moved to Storm Hill in Lansford, where he served as a recruiter for the Ancient Order of Hibernians. He became a hotel owner, and liquor distributor, and was allegedly a member of the Mollies. This was a term used in the Pennsylvanian coal mining counties Carbon and Schuylkill by miners, mainly Irish immigrants, to describe those who took part in organized labor movements and violently resisted conscription.

== Crime and punishment ==
The Molly Maguires were generally seen, outside their circle of supporters, as murderers, terrorists, and foreign agitators. In 1877, along with three other men (Michael Doyle, John Donahue and Edward Kelly), Campbell was convicted of the murders of John P. Jones and Morgan Powell, but he admitted to only being an accessory. Evidence collected was presented by a single detective from the Pinkerton Agency.

The convicts were taken to Carbon County Jail, and Campbell was assigned to cell #17. For days they were forced to listen to the noise made whilst the gallows were being built, outside in the courtyard. On the morning of execution, the courtyard was packed with people. The convicts kept their dignity, but when the guards went to fetch Campbell, he tried one last time to proclaim his innocence. When they refused to let him go, he put his hand in the dirt, and marked the wall with it, stating the mark would remain forever as a sign of his innocence. All four men were then hanged.

== The handprint ==
The handprint Campbell left is still there today, although the wall has been washed, painted over, and, according to some versions, even knocked down and replaced. A forensic scientist who examined the handprint with infrared photography in the 1990s concluded that it had never been painted over, and stated that the history of Campbell's execution suggests a right hand print on the wall, rather than the left hand print that is currently visible. The prison is listed on the National Register of Historic labor conflicts.

== Pennsylvania legislature ==
Both branches of the Pennsylvania legislature have passed resolutions (House Resolution No. 527, Session of 2005, and Senate Resolution No. 235 Session of 2006) asserting that the trial of Campbell and the three other accused Molly Maguires was "inherently unconstitutional."

== In popular culture ==
The story of Campbell's handprint was also featured in the second season of Beyond Belief: Fact or Fiction, in a segment named "The Wall".
