= Margo (singer) =

Irish singer (born 1951)

- Margo in concert.

Background information
- Also known as: "The Queen of Country and Irish"
- Born: Margaret Catherine O'Donnell; 6 February 1951 (age 75); County Donegal, Ireland
- Genres: Country
- Occupation: Singer
- Instrument: Vocals
- Years active: 1964–present
- Website: Official website

Margo (born Margaret Catherine O'Donnell; 6 February 1951) is an Irish singer. She rose to prominence during the 1960s in the Irish country music scene and has had a long career since.

== Background ==
Margo was brought up in the small village of Kincasslagh, in The Rosses area of County Donegal, Ireland. She grew up in a Catholic family, with her parents Francis and Julia (née McGonagle) O'Donnell, and her siblings: John (the eldest), Kathleen, James; and the youngest Daniel, who is also a singer. Her father died of a heart attack when she was seventeen.

== Career ==
Margo started performing country music at a young age in 1964 with a local showband, The Keynotes. She recorded her first single in 1968, "Bonny Irish Boy/Dear God", and followed this with a second single, "If I Could See the World Through the Eyes of a Child/Road By the River", released in 1969. In the next five decades, Margo sold over 1 million records, and performed with Johnny Cash, Loretta Lynn and Dolly Parton. She presented several TV shows for RTÉ in the 1970s and has collected a number of awards during her career. Her albums usually include covers of popular country music hits from the 1960s and 1970s. Her 2019 album "Old and New" contains original tribute songs to two of her greatest influences, Liz Anderson and Jean Shepard. She has recorded a number of songs written by Liz Anderson and also a number written by Dolly Parton and on her album Margo and Friends she duets with Parton on "God's Coloring Book".

== Personal life ==
Margo is sister to Irish singer Daniel O'Donnell, who got his start with Margo's band in the early 1980s while attending college in Galway. Margo was named "2007 Donegal Person Of The Year" and spent most of 2007 travelling Ireland acting as an ambassador to the county. She is a resident of Castleblayney, County Monaghan.

Since 1977, she has been active in the search for Mary Boyle, a distant relative from Kincasslagh, who went missing at age six near Ballyshannon, County Donegal. In 2011, she released the single "The Missing Mary Boyle" to raise funds for a new search for the missing girl.

In 2015, Margo wrote a memoir, Margo: Queen of Country & Irish: The Promise and the Dream that was published by The O'Brien Press.

== Discography ==
Studio albums

- Margo and the Country Folk (with the Country Folk) (1970)
- From Margo with Love (1971)
- Country Lovin' (1972)
- At Home in Ireland (1974)
- The Girl from Donegal (1975)
- Yes! Mr. Peters (with Larry Cunningham) (1976)
- A Toast to Claddagh (1977)
- A Toast from an Irish Colleen (1981)
- Ireland Must Be Heaven (1982)
- The Irish Songs I Love to Sing (Note: The Irish Songs I Love to Sing was reissued as The Girl from Donegal in the UK in May 1988 with four additional tracks.) (1984)
- Margo Now (1987)
- A Trip Through Ireland (Note: A Trip Through Ireland was reissued in August 2010 under the title Ireland’s Where I Call Home.) (1989)
- Ireland on My Mind (1992)
- New Beginnings (1994)
- Old Friends of Mine (Note: Old Friends of Mine was included as a bonus CD with the 2006 DVD Margo’s Ireland. When the album was reissued digitally it was re-titled Margo’s Ireland.) (1995)
- Old Friends Share Old Memories (Note: Old Friends Share Old Memories was reissued in 2002 under the title The Way Old Friends Do.) (with Philomena Begley) (1996)
- The Highway of My Life: Shade of the Family Tree (1998)
- I'm Still Here (2002)
- Parcel of Dreams (2006)
- Stories in Song (2010)
- The World Through My Eyes (2012)
- The Promise and the Dream (2014)
