= The Homes of Donegal =

The Homes of Donegal is an Irish ballad written by songwriter Seán McBride in 1955. It has been performed by a number of singers, including Paul Brady.

McBride was a native of Cruit Island which is in The Rosses area of north-west County Donegal. He was a school teacher at St. Baithin's Primary School in the village of St Johnston (East Donegal) for most of his life. He died at the age of 90 in August 1996 and is buried on his native Cruit Island.

McBride only wrote the lyrics; the actual air itself may be 150 or more years old. There are many songs which use a similar melody, including a song called "The Faughan Side", which may have inspired the melody for the "Homes of Donegal".
