= Doochary =

Gaeltacht village in County Donegal, Ireland

An Dúbh Choraidh Doochary
- Village
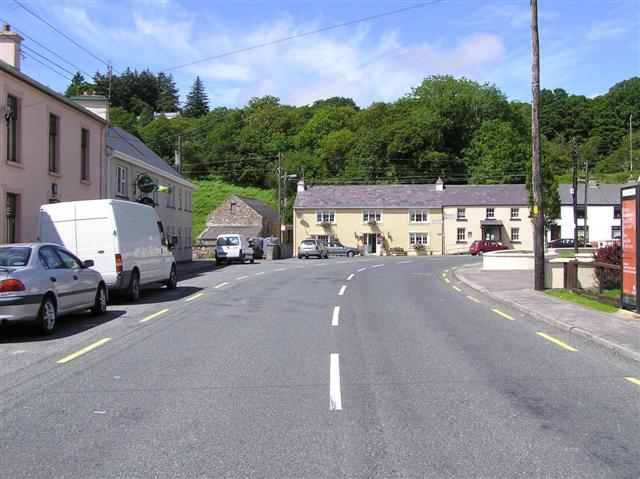

- Location in Ireland
- Coordinates: 54°54′22″N 8°12′29″W
- Country: Ireland
- Province: Ulster
- County: County Donegal
- Barony: Boylagh
- District: The Rosses
- Time zone: UTC+0 (WET)
  - Summer (DST): UTC-1 (IST (WEST))
- An Dúbh Choraidh is the only official name. The anglicised spelling Doochary has no official status.

An Dúbh Choraidh or An Dúcharaidh (anglicised as Doochary), meaning "the black weir", is a small village in the Rosses district in the west of County Donegal in Ulster, the northern province in Ireland. Doochary is within the Gaeltacht, meaning the Irish language is the main language used there. Doochary was awarded the Tidy Towns award in 1997.

== See also ==
- List of towns and villages in the Republic of Ireland
