= Cruit Island =

Island in County Donegal, Ireland

Cruit Island An Chruit
- Populated place
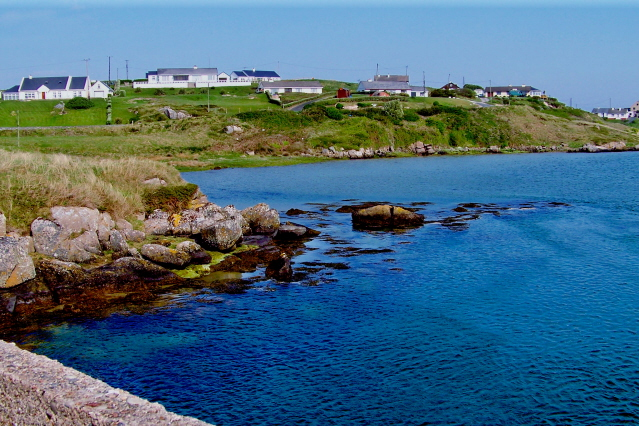
- South side of the island

- Location in Ireland
- Coordinates: 55°01′53″N 8°25′03″W
- Country: Ireland
- Province: Ulster
- County: County Donegal
- Barony: Boylagh
- District: The Rosses

Population (2022)
  - Total: 92
- Time zone: UTC+0 (WET)
  - Summer (DST): UTC-1 (IST (WEST))
- Irish Grid Reference: B847228

Cruit Island (Irish: An Chruit or Oileán na Cruite) is a small inhabited island in the Rosses district in the west of County Donegal in Ulster, the northern province in Ireland. It is linked to the mainland by a bridge.

== Culture ==
Cruit Island has a strong musical heritage. Seán McBride (Irish: Seán Mac Giolla Bhride), a native of Cruit who spent most of his life both living in and working as a teacher in St. Johnston in East Donegal, wrote the Irish ballad The Homes of Donegal in 1955. The song Thíos Cois na Trá Domh originates from the island and remains a popular song in the Donegal Gaeltacht to this day.

== Demographics ==
Historical population

Year	Pop.	±%
1841	258	—
1851	252	−2.3%
1861	260	+3.2%
1871	273	+5.0%
1881	286	+4.8%
1891	252	−11.9%
1901	245	−2.8%
1911	255	+4.1%
1926	237	−7.1%

Year	Pop.	±%
1936	279	+17.7%
1946	172	−38.4%
1951	151	−12.2%
1956	135	−10.6%
1961	107	−20.7%
1966	86	−19.6%
1971	69	−19.8%
1979	84	+21.7%
1981	83	−1.2%

Year	Pop.	±%
1986	89	+7.2%
1991	77	−13.5%
1996	70	−9.1%
2002	61	−12.9%
2006	53	−13.1%
2011	85	+60.4%
2016	60	−29.4%
2022	92	+53.3%

Source: Central Statistics Office. "CNA17: Population by Off Shore Island, Sex and Year". CSO.ie.
