= Ranafast =

Gaeltacht village in County Donegal, Ireland

Ranafast Irish: Rann na Feirste Rinnafarset
- Village
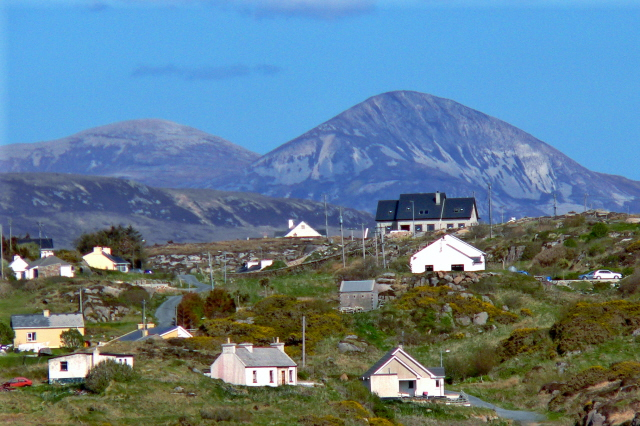
- A view of Ranafast

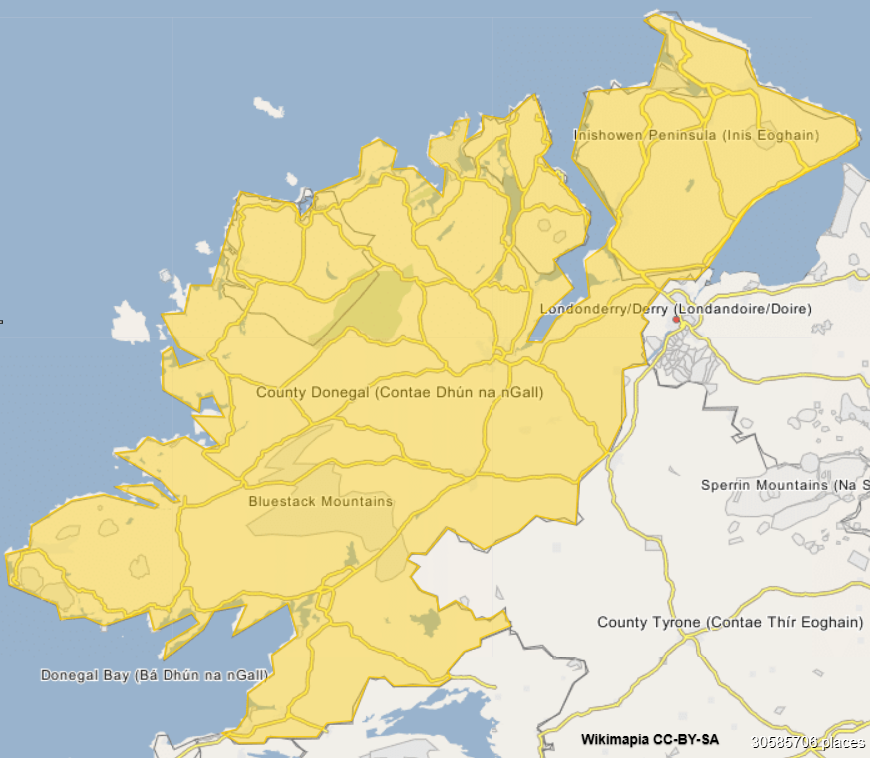
- Location within County Donegal Location within Ireland
- Coordinates: 55°02′04″N 8°18′22″W
- Country: Ireland
- Province: Ulster
- County: County Donegal
- Barony: Boylagh

Government
  - Dáil constituency: Donegal

Population
  - Total: 350
- Irish Grid Reference: B847228
- Rann na Feirste is the only official name. The anglicised spellings Rannafast and Rinnafarset have no official status.

Ranafast or Rinnafarset, officially only known by its Irish name Rann na Feirste (IPA: [ˌɾˠaːn̪ˠ n̪ˠə ˈfʲɛɾˠʃtʲə]), is a Gaeltacht village and townland in the Rosses district in the west of County Donegal in Ulster, the northern province in Ireland.

== Name ==
Ranafast, or sometimes Rannafast or Rinnafarset, is the anglicised version of the area's original and official name Rann na Feirste.

== Language ==
Ranafast is a Gaeltacht area, therefore the Irish language is the predominantly spoken language. According to the 2016 census 90.4% of the population of Ranafast could speak Irish and 66.6% of the population spoke Irish daily outside the education system.

== Arts and culture ==
The writers Séamus Ó Grianna and Seosamh Mac Grianna were born in Ranafast.

The storyteller and writer, Mici (Sheáin Néill) Ó Baoill, was from Ranafast.

== Education ==
There is a primary gaelcoil, Scoil Naisiunta Olibhear Pluinceid (Oliver Plunkett National School), located in the village.

Coláiste Bhríde is an Irish-language Gaeltacht College that was established in the village by Fr Lorcán Ó Muireadhaigh in August 1926. The college was formerly based in Omeath, County Louth from 1912-1926. A number of notable people have attended the college including T. K. Whitaker, Éamon de Valera, Bernadette McAliskey, Phil Coulter, and Cardinal Tomás O Fiaich.

== See also ==
- List of towns and villages in the Republic of Ireland
