= Lorcán Ó Muireadais =

Lorcán Ó Muireadhaigh (1883–1941) was an Irish Roman Catholic priest, Irish language educator and nationalist activist. Another Gaelicisation of his name (as per the Ulster Biography) is Lorcan Ó Muireadhaigh.

He was born Laurence Patrick Murray in Carlingford, County Louth in 1883. He was educated locally and at St Patrick's College, Armagh, before going to Maynooth Seminary in 1901. Ó Muireadhaigh wrote articles for the Louth Archaeological Journal and Irisleabhar Maighe Nuadhat. He travelled as a student to St Paul, Minnesota in the United States, was ordained priest there in 1910, and became a mathematics teacher at the College of St Thomas. Following the foundation of Omeath Irish College in 1912, he spent every summer teaching in the Omeath Gaeltacht.

In 1917 he lost his position at the College of Saint Thomas for refusing to take an oath of allegiance, and returned to Ireland as stoker on a ship because the British Embassy refused him a visa. In 1918 he was appointed curate in the parish of Clonfeacle, where he taught Gaelic and Irish dancing. In 1921 he became Religious Inspector for schools; he remained in that position for the next sixteen years.

In 1924 he established the Gaelic monthly, An tUltach (The Ulsterman). In 1925 he founded St. Brigid's College in Ranafast, County Donegal.

In 1926 he established the Gaelic League Provisional Council for the nine counties of Ulster and County Louth. He was an active supporter of the Gaelic Athletic Association and served as a team coach. His publications include Ceolta Omeith (1920; a collection of songs) and Pota Cnuasaigh (1924).
