= Kincasslagh =

Gaeltacht village in County Donegal, Ireland

Cionn Caslach Kincasslagh
- Village
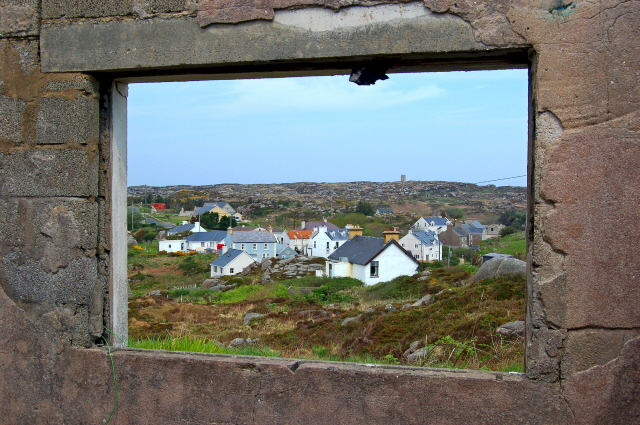
- A view of Cionn Caslach village

- Location in Ireland
- Coordinates: 55°02′13″N 8°20′26″W
- Country: Ireland
- Province: Ulster
- County: County Donegal
- Barony: Boylagh

Government
  - Dáil Éireann: Donegal

Population
  - Rural: 41
- Time zone: UTC+0 (WET)
  - Summer (DST): UTC-1 (IST (WEST))
- Area code: 074 95, +00 353 74 95
- Irish Grid Reference: B738189
- Website: www.kincasslagh.net
- Cionn Caslach is the only official name. The anglicised spelling Kincasslagh has no official status.

Cionn Caslach (anglicised as Kincasslagh) is a small Gaeltacht seaside village in The Rosses district in the west of County Donegal in Ulster, the northern province in Ireland. Despite only having a population of just over 40 people, the village has attracted much international attention due to the success of local singer Daniel O'Donnell.

== Name ==
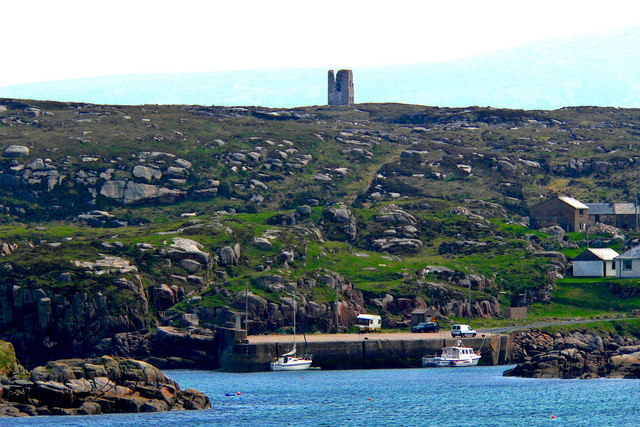
Kincasslagh Peninsula and pier

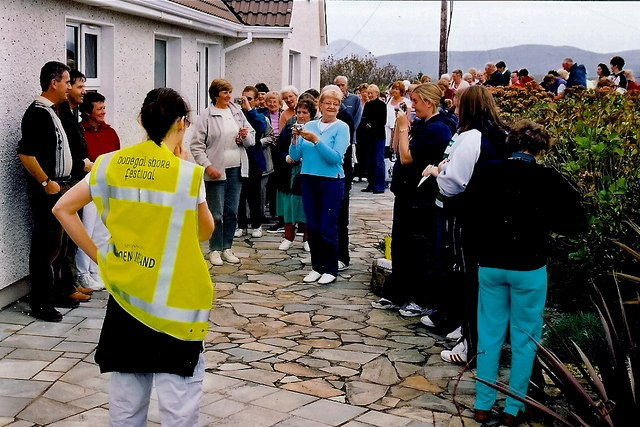
Fans meeting Daniel O'Donnell at his annual 'tea party', at his mother's residence in Kincasslagh

The Irish and official name for Kincasslagh is Cionn Caslach or Ceann Caslach, which means head of the small inlet. Due to its status as a Gaeltacht village, all roadsigns to and in the village itself are in the Irish language.

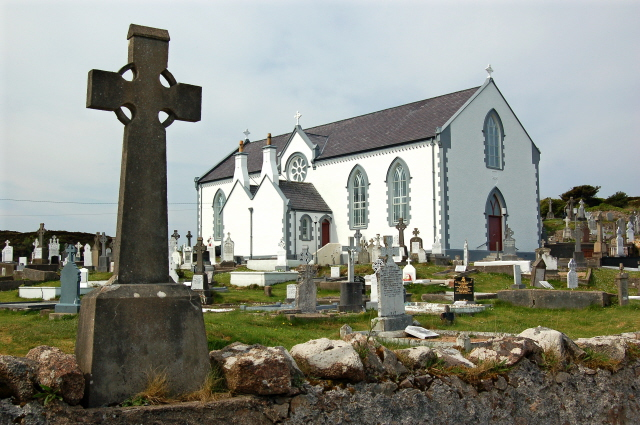
St. Mary's Church, known locally as 'the Chapel', the local Catholic place of worship

== Language ==
Kincasslagh is in a Gaeltacht district which means the official language of the area is Irish. However, the use of the language has been in decline since the 1950s. There are very few Irish-speakers in Kincasslagh today, much like neighbouring villages Mullaghduff and Burtonport.

== History ==
Kincasslagh has a long history of emigration, much like the rest of West Donegal. In the 1950s and 1960s, a large number of locals left the area to work in countries such as Great Britain (England and especially Scotland), the USA and Australia.

== Education ==
The local primary school is the Irish language Scoil Náisiúnta Béal na Cruite with 39 pupils, and the nearest secondary school is Rosses Community School in Dungloe.

== Local amenities ==
There is only one public house in the village Iggy's, and the one grocery shop, The Cope, is part of a cooperative retail chain indigenous to the area. The Viking House is the nearest hotel to the village, which was once owned by singer Daniel O'Donnell. Kincasslagh is also the nearest village to Cruit Island, which boasts a very popular golf course.

== Sport ==
The local Gaelic Athletic Association (GAA) team is Naomh Mhuire CLG which covers the greater Lower Rosses area. The local soccer team is Keadue Rovers.

== Arts ==
Kincasslagh is probably best known for being the birthplace of singers Margo and Daniel O'Donnell. The village played host to Daniel's annual tea party which he held at his mother's home as part of the Donegal Shore Festival, which drew thousands of fans each year. The village was used as a location for the film American Women / The Closer You Get.

== Transport ==
Kincasslagh is situated five kilometres from Donegal International Airport. Kincasslagh Road railway station, five kilometres south, was open from 1913 until 1940 when the Derry and Lough Swilly Railway closed the line due to financial difficulties.

== See also ==
- List of towns and villages in Ireland
