= Annagry =

Village in County Donegal, Ireland

Anagaire Annagry
- Village
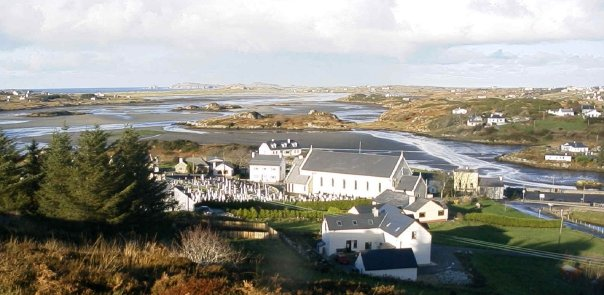

- Location in Ireland
- Coordinates: 55°01′09″N 8°18′44″W
- Country: Ireland
- Province: Ulster
- County: County Donegal
- Barony: Boylagh

Government
  - Dáil Éireann: Donegal
- Elevation: 70 m (230 ft)

Population (2022)
  - Total: 309
- Time zone: UTC+0 (WET)
  - Summer (DST): UTC-1 (IST (WEST))
- Area codes: 074 95, +000 353 74 95
- Irish Grid Reference: B808187
- Anagaire is the only official name. The anglicised spelling Annagry has no official status.

Anagaire (anglicised as Annagry) is a village in The Rosses district in County Donegal, Ireland. As of 2022, the population was 309.

== Name ==
The Irish and official name for Annagry is Anagaire, which in turn derives from Áth na gCoire meaning "ford of the cauldrons".

== Language ==
There are 2,354 people living in the Anagaire ED and 55% of them are native Irish speakers. Annagry is in the Gaeltacht region which means the official language of the area is Irish. However, the use of the language has been in decline since the 1930s. Despite this, it has an Irish language college in the summer months which runs courses for students from English-speaking areas of the country, Coláiste na Rosann.

== History ==
Annagry has a long history of emigration, much like the rest of County Donegal. In the 1950s, a large number of locals left the area to work in other countries.

== Education ==
The local primary school is Scoil Náisiúnta Dhubhthaigh with 144 pupils, and the nearest secondary school is Rosses Community School in Dungloe.

== Sport ==
The local Gaelic Athletic Association (GAA) team is CLG Naomh Muire which serves the Lower Rosses area. Football (also known as soccer) is also popular in the village.

== Transport ==
Annagry is one mile from Donegal Airport (Carrickfinn Airport) which has daily flights to Dublin and four flights a week to Glasgow, which are operated by Aer Lingus and Loganair respectively. Annagry is also serviced by a TFI Local Link route from Crolly to Dungloe (Route 992).

== Amenities ==
In the first week of June, the annual 'Annagry Festival' takes place. Sharkey's Bar has been run by the Sharkey family since 1888. The Caisleáin Óir hotel (formerly Jack's Bar) and Duffy's Bar are also public houses in Annagry. There is also a branch of the Cope supermarket chain in the village.

There is also a business centre in Annagry that contains a pharmacy, Post Office, and a hair salon, alongside some office spaces located above.

The local chapel for the Annagry parish is the Saint Mary's Star of the Sea church, located near Caisleáin Óir.

== See also ==
- List of populated places in the Republic of Ireland
- List of towns and villages in Northern Ireland
