= Boylagh =

Boylagh Baollaigh (Irish)
- Barony
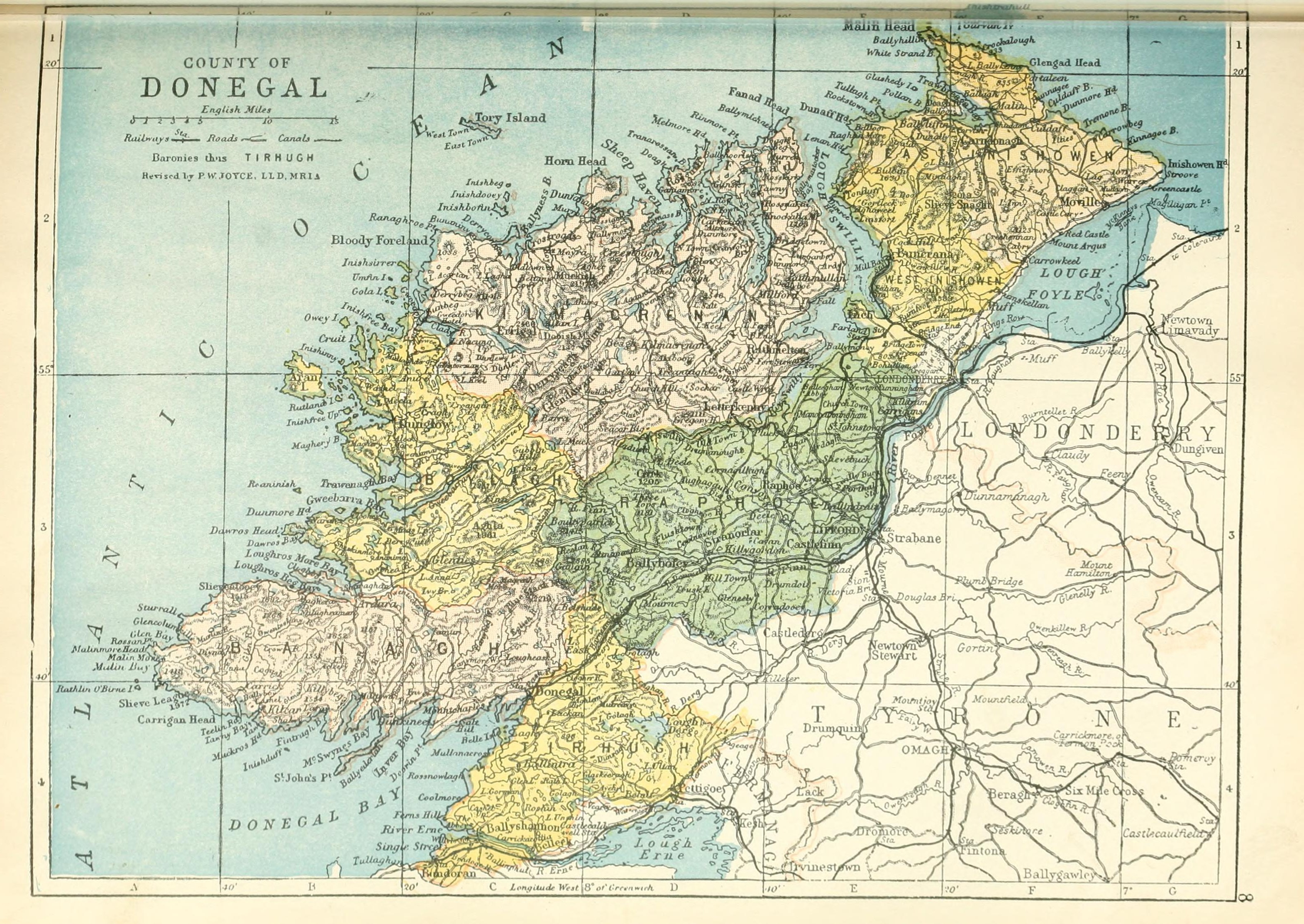
- Barony map of County Donegal, 1900; Boylagh is in the west, coloured yellow.

- Location within Ireland
- Coordinates: 54°54′N 8°12′W
- Sovereign state: Ireland
- Province: Ulster
- County: Donegal

Area
  - Total: 717.46 km^{2} (277.01 sq mi)

Boylagh (Irish: Baollaigh (Note: Boylagh)) is a historic barony in County Donegal in Ireland. Patrick Weston Joyce said the name Boylagh comes from the territory of the O'Boyles. It was created along with Banagh when the former barony of Boylagh and Banagh was split in 1791 by an Act of the Parliament of Ireland.

Boylagh is bordered by the baronies of Kilmacrenan to the north east, Rapboe South to the east, and Banagh to the south; to the north and west is the Atlantic Ocean.

== Civil parishes ==
The barony contains the following civil parishes:

- Inishkeel (also partly in barony of Banagh)
- Killybegs Lower (also partly in barony of Banagh)
- Lettermacaward
- Templecrone

== Towns and villages ==
Settlements in the barony include Annagry, Burtonport, Doochary, Dungloe, Glenties, Kilrean, Lettermacaward, Portnoo, and Ranafast. Other features include the island of Arranmore.

== Features ==
The barony is thus described in the Parliamentary Gazetteer of 1846:

It includes the district of the Rosses in the north, and 12 inhabited islands, besides islets and insulated rocks, off the west coast. The estuaries of the Guidore and the Guibarra, the bays of Dungloe and Tyrenagh, and numerous unnavigable sandy marine inlets, cut its seaboard into a constant and intricate series of variously outlined peninsulae. A great undulating plain or champaign territory of granite constitutes its western district, and exhibits an irksome and almost uniform surface of dark peat, dotted with loughlets or ponds, and slightly variegated with patches of tillage around the cabins. Crovehy, whose summit has an altitude of 1,033 feet above sea-level, is the highest ground in this wild and dreary tract, and the small and utterly sequestered village of Dunglow, is almost the only apology for a town. The eastern district is a mass or congeries of uplands, cloven by glens and ravines This barony comprehends part of the parishes of Inniskeel and Lower Killybegs, and the whole of the parishes of Lettermacward and Templecroan; and its chief villages are Glenties and Dungloe.
