= Dungloe =

Gaeltacht town in County Donegal, Ireland

An Clochán Liath Dungloe
- Town
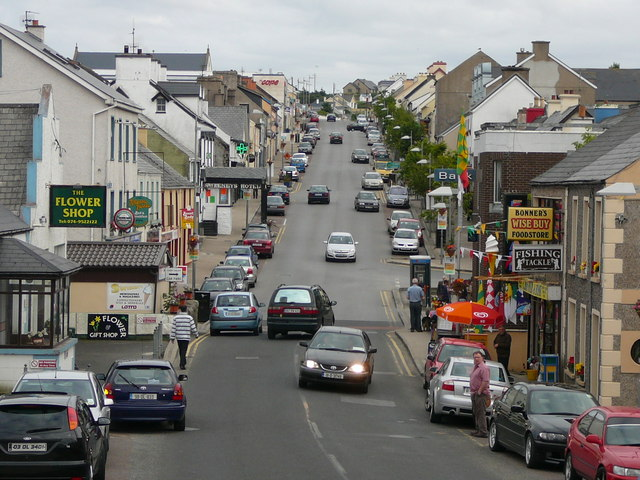
- Main Street

- Location in Ireland
- Coordinates: 54.952°N 8.358°W
- Country: Ireland
- Province: Ulster
- County: County Donegal
- Barony: Boylagh
- Dáil Éireann: Donegal
- Elevation: 16 m (52 ft)

Population (2022)
  - Total: 1,247
- Dialing code: 074, +000 353 74
- Irish Grid Reference: B766115
- As this is officially a Gaeltacht town, the Irish An Clochán Liath is the only official name. However, the name 'Dungloe' remains in widespread use.

An Clochán Liath, known in English as Dungloe or Dunglow (/dʌnˈloʊ/ dun-LOH) and formerly as Cloghanlea, is a small town on the west coast of County Donegal, Ireland. It is the main town in The Rosses district and the largest in the Donegal Gaeltacht (Irish-speaking region). It developed as a town in the mid 18th century, and now serves as the administrative and retail centre for the west of County Donegal, and in particular The Rosses, with the only mainland secondary school for the area.

== Name ==
The Irish name of the town, An Clochán Liath, is the only official name. It means "the grey stepping-stones", referring to the stepping stones that were once used to cross the river where the town stands, before the bridge was built in 1782. This Irish name was anglicised as "Cloghanlea".

The English name of the town is "Dungloe" or "Dunglow". This is believed to come from Irish Dún gCloiche, meaning "stone fort". It replaced Cloghanlea as the town's English name in the late 18th century. Dungloe was originally the name of a ruined fort (dún) at Cloghglass, several miles north, where a monthly fair had been held. When the Dungloe fair moved to the growing town at Cloghanlea, its name also transferred to the town.

== Irish language ==
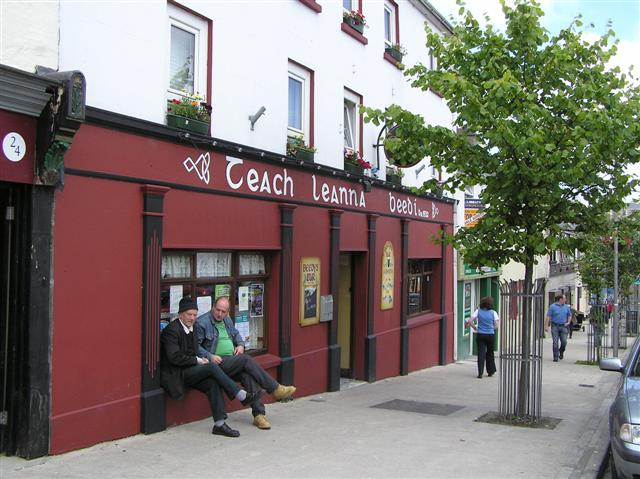
Teach Leanna Beedi

Historically, the town was almost wholly Irish-speaking. It remained a majority-Irish speaking town into the 20th century, and thus was included in the Gaeltacht, the designated Irish-speaking regions of Ireland.

By 2015, the Comprehensive Linguistic Survey of the Gaeltacht (revised) found that only 21.4% of the population still spoke Irish on a daily basis, despite being within the Gaeltacht. Nevertheless, there are Irish-speaking areas outside the town, and Irish is to be heard regularly in the town.

== Facilities and amenities ==
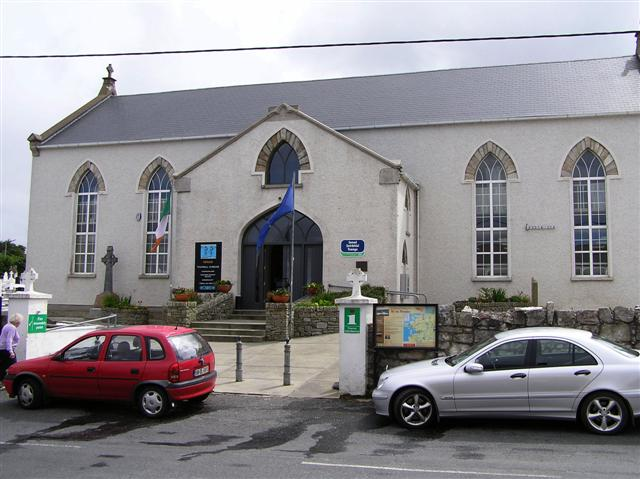
Dungloe Library

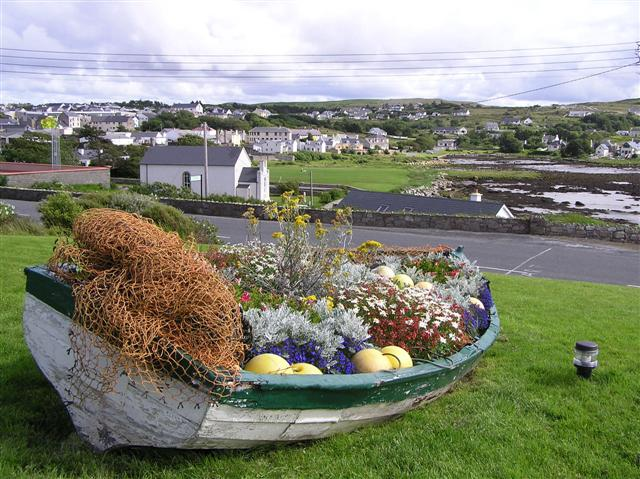
At Ostan Na Rosann Hotel

Dungloe is home to the Dungloe District Court, which covers the west and south-west areas of County Donegal. The local council offices are situated in the Public Services Centre on the Gweedore Road, including an Intreo centre, Citizens Information centre and Donegal County Council office.

There is a Garda station, Donegal County Council office, and a fire station, located on the Main Street. Also, there are several convenience stores, supermarkets, cafes, pubs and restaurants. The town is the headquarters of The Rosses' indigenous supermarket chain, The Cope.

The Dungloe Community Hospital campus also contains a hospital, mental health services and a day centre for the elderly.

A visitor centre to Daniel O'Donnell was opened in 2012 in the town's former National Irish Bank building. The visitor centre closed in 2019.

== Tourism ==
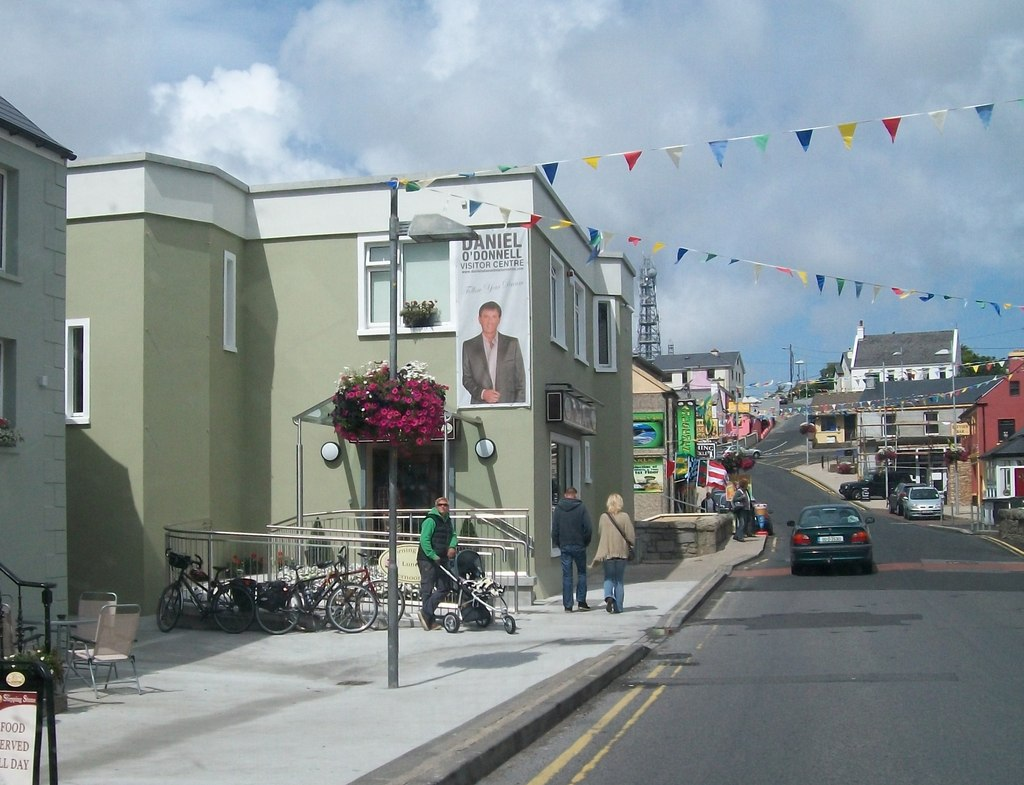
"Wee Daniel's" Visitor Centre, Dungloe

The town attracts tourists during July and August when the annual Mary From Dungloe International Festival takes place. It was founded in the 1960s and it has attracted 'special guests' over the years including Daniel O'Donnell, Cliff Richard, Gay Byrne and Sharon Shannon. Dungloe Bay and its surrounding hills have also attracted tourists to Dungloe. There is also a festival dedicated to the socialist writer Peadar O'Donnell in Dungloe each autumn. A little to the north of the town is the site of the ancient church of Templecrone.

== Transport ==
The town is serviced by a regional Bus Éireann route and several TFI Local Link routes, as well as a number of private bus companies, both of which provide a link to national Bus Éireann routes through Donegal Town and Letterkenny, and to the north of the county and Derry also.

In 1903, the town was linked, through Dungloe railway station, to the Londonderry and Lough Swilly Railway. However, the station was closed on 3 June 1940 as part of a process that saw the closure of all railways in the county. The company continued to provide coach services to the town via the Lough Swilly Bus Company in the aftermath of the closure of the railways; however, this ended in April 2014.

== Religion ==
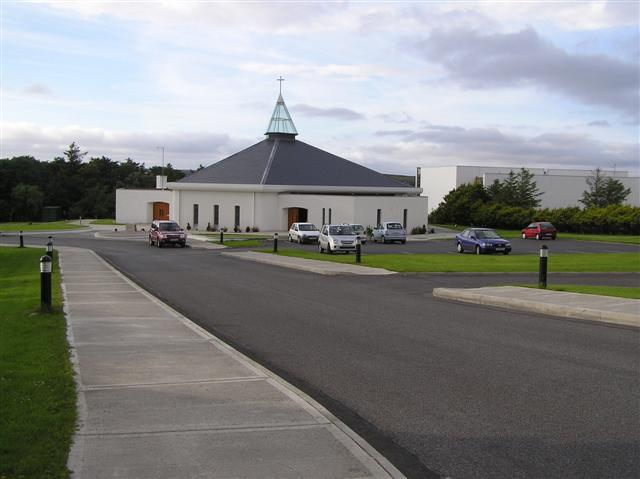
Dungloe Catholic Church

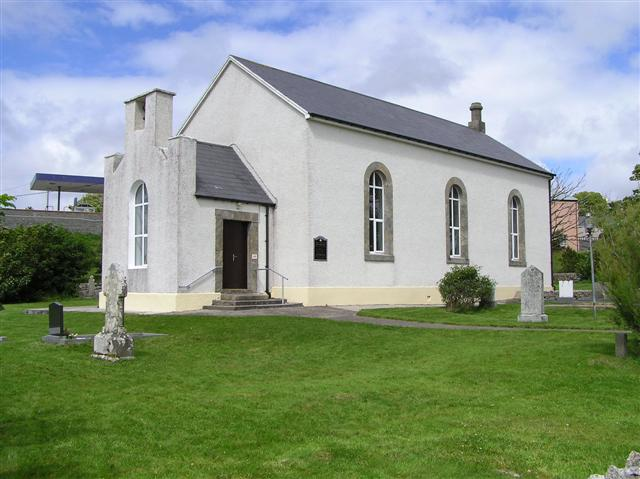
St Crone's Church of Ireland Church.

By the standards of a rural Gaeltacht area, Dungloe has a significant Protestant minority, many of whom are Presbyterian. This is a result of the Plantation of Ulster in the seventeenth century. However, the town has a large Catholic majority.

== In popular culture ==
Dungloe is mentioned in FX series Sons of Anarchy as the source of the motorcycle club's weapons from the True IRA, a fictional representation of the Real IRA.

The song Mary from Dungloe by Emmet Spiceland.

== People ==
- Tony Boyle (born 1970) – All-Ireland winning Gaelic footballer
- Alexander Campbell (1833–1877) – American businessman
- Paddy "the Cope" Gallagher (1871–1966) – businessman
- John O'Donnell (1910–1954) – Gaelic footballer
- Peadar O'Donnell (1893–1986) – republican Marxist
- Adrian Sweeney (born 1976) – All-Star Gaelic footballer
- Goats Don't Shave, Irish folk group

== See also ==
- List of towns and villages in the Republic of Ireland
- List of towns and villages in Northern Ireland
