= Ulster Irish =

Irish language dialect

- Donegal Irish • Ulster Gaelic
- Gaeilg Uladh
- Pronunciation: [ˈɡeːlʲəc ˌʊlˠuː]
- Ethnicity: Irish; Ulstermen
- Language family: Indo-European: Celtic; Insular Celtic; Goidelic; Irish; Ulster Irish
- Early forms: Primitive Irish: Old Irish; Middle Irish; Early Modern Irish
- Dialects: Western (Donegal); Eastern † (Including Antrim dialect †)
- Writing system: Latin (Irish alphabet); Irish Braille

Language codes
- ISO 639-3: –
- Glottolog: done1238
- The Gaeltachtaí

- Percentage of population in each administrative area (Counties in Republic of Ireland and District council areas in Northern Ireland) in Ulster who claims to have some knowledge of and who use Irish daily.

Ulster Irish (endonym: Gaeilg Uladh or Irish: Gaeilic Uladh, Standard Irish: Gaeilge Uladh) is the variety of Irish spoken in the province of Ulster. It has much in common with Scottish Gaelic and Manx. Within Ulster there have historically been two main sub-dialects: West Ulster and East Ulster. The Western dialect is spoken in parts of County Donegal and was once spoken in parts of neighbouring counties, hence the name 'Donegal Irish'. The Eastern dialect was spoken in most of the rest of Ulster and northern parts of counties Louth and Meath.

== History ==
Ulster Irish was the main language spoken in most of Ulster from the earliest recorded times even before Ireland became a jurisdiction in the 1300s. Since the Plantation, Ulster Irish was steadily replaced by English and Ulster Scots, largely as a result of incoming settlers. The Eastern dialect died out in the 20th century, but the Western lives on in the Gaeltacht region of County Donegal. In 1808, County Down natives William Neilson and Patrick Lynch (Pádraig Ó Loingsigh) published a detailed study on Ulster Irish. Both Neilson and his father were Ulster-speaking Presbyterian ministers. When the recommendations of the first Comisiún na Gaeltachta were drawn up in 1926, there were regions qualifying for Gaeltacht recognition in the Sperrins and the northern Glens of Antrim and Rathlin Island. The report also makes note of small pockets of Irish speakers in northwest County Cavan, southeast County Monaghan, and the far south of County Armagh. However, these small pockets vanished early in the 20th century while Ulster Irish in the Sperrins survived until the 1950s and in the Glens of Antrim until the 1970s. The last native speaker of Rathlin Irish died in 1985.

According to Innti poet and scholar of Modern literature in Irish Louis de Paor, Belfast Irish, "a new urban dialect", of Ulster Irish, was "forged in the heat of Belfast during The Troubles" and is the main language spoken in the Gaeltacht Quarter of the city. The same dialect, according to de Paor, has been used in the poetry of Gearóid Mac Lochlainn and other radically innovative writers like him.

== Phonology ==
=== Consonants ===
The phonemic consonant inventory of Ulster Irish (based on the dialect of Gweedore) is as shown in the following chart (see International Phonetic Alphabet for an explanation of the symbols). Symbols appearing in the upper half of each row are velarized (traditionally called "broad" consonants) while those in the bottom half are palatalized ("slender"). The consonants /h, n, l/ are neither broad nor slender.

Consonant phonemes	Labial					Coronal						Dorsal				Glottal
Consonant phonemes	Bilabial		Labio- dental		Labio- velar	Dental		Alveolar		Alveolo- palatal		Palatal		Velar		Glottal
Plosive	pˠ pʲ	bˠ bʲ				t̪ˠ	d̪ˠ			ṯʲ	ḏʲ	c	ɟ	k	ɡ	
Fricative/ Approximant			fˠ fʲ	vʲ	w			sˠ		ʃ		ç	j	x	ɣ	h
Nasal		mˠ mʲ					n̪ˠ		n		ṉʲ		ɲ		ŋ	
Tap									ɾˠ ɾʲ							
Lateral approximant							l̪ˠ		l		ḻʲ					

Some characteristics of the phonology of Ulster Irish that distinguish it from the other dialects are:

- /w/ is always the approximant [w]. In other dialects, fricative [vˠ] is found instead of or in addition to [w]. No dialect makes a phonemic contrast between the approximant and the fricative, however.
- There is a three-way distinction among coronal nasals, /n̪ˠ, n, ṉʲ/, and laterals, /l̪ˠ, l, ḻʲ/, as there is in Scottish Gaelic, and there is no lengthening or diphthongization of short vowels before these sounds and /m/. Thus, while ceann "head" is /cɑːn/ in Connacht and /caun/ in Munster, in Ulster it is /can̪ˠ/ (compare Scottish Gaelic /kʲaun̪ˠ/)
- ⟨n⟩ is pronounced as if it is spelled ⟨r⟩ (/ɾˠ/ or /ɾʲ/) after consonants other than ⟨s⟩. This happens in Connacht and Scottish Gaelic as well.
- /x/ is often realised as [h] and can completely disappear word finally, hence unstressed -⟨ach⟩ (a common suffix) is realised as [ax], [ah], or [a]. For some speakers /xt/ is realised as [ɾˠt].

=== Vowels ===
The vowels of Ulster Irish are as shown on the following chart. These positions are only approximate, as vowels are strongly influenced by the palatalization and velarization of surrounding consonants.

The vowels transcribed ⟨æː, ʌ, ɤ, ɔː⟩ correspond to /aː, ɔ, ʊ, oː/ respectively

The long vowels have short allophones in unstressed syllables and before /h/. In addition, Ulster has the diphthongs /ia, ua, au/.

- Before /x/, where an unstressed schwa is found in other dialects, Ulster has [a] with secondary stress (identical to /aː/), e.g. feargach /ˈfʲaɾˠəɡa(x)/ "angry" and iománaíocht /ˈɔmˠaːnˠiaxt̪ˠ/ "hurling".
- /aː/ is more fronted in Ulster than Connacht and Munster (where it is [ɑː]), as [aː] or even [æː~ɛ̞ː] preceding slender consonants. Unstressed ⟨eoi⟩ and ⟨ói⟩ merge with ⟨ái⟩ as /aː/ ([æ~ɛ̞]).
- Stressed word final ⟨(e)aith⟩, ⟨oith⟩, and /ah, ɔh/ preceding a syllable containing /iː/ tend to represent /əih/. For example /mˠəih/ maith "good" and /ˈkəihiːɾʲ/ cathaoir "chair", in contrast to /mˠah/ and /ˈkahiːɾʲ/ found in other regions.
- Stressed ⟨(e)adh(a(i))⟩, ⟨(e)agh(a(i))⟩, as well as ⟨ia⟩ after an initial ⟨r⟩, represent /ɤː/ which generally merges with /eː/ in younger speech.
- /eː/ has three main allophones: [eː] morpheme finally and after broad consonants, [ɛə] before broad consonants, [ei] before slender consonants.
- Stressed ⟨eidh(e(a))⟩ and ⟨eigh(e(a))⟩ represent /eː/ rather than /əi/ which is found in the other dialects.
- /iː/ before broad consonants merges with /iə/, and vice versa. That is, /iə/ merges with /iː/ before slender consonants.
- ⟨ao⟩ represents [ɯː] for many speakers, but it often merges with /iː/ especially in younger speech.
- ⟨eo(i)⟩ and ⟨ó(i)⟩ are pronounced [ɔː], unless beside ⟨m, mh, n⟩ where they raise to [oː], the main realisation in other dialects, e.g. /fˠoːnˠ ˈpˠɔːkə/ fón póca "mobile phone".
- Stressed ⟨(e)abha(i)⟩, ⟨(e)obh(a(i))⟩, ⟨(e)odh(a(i))⟩ and ⟨(e)ogh(a(i))⟩ mainly represent [oː], not /əu/ as in the other dialects.
- Word final unstressed ⟨(e)adh⟩ represents /uː/, not /ə/ as in the other dialects, e.g. /ˈsˠauɾˠuː/ for samhradh "summer".
- Word final /əw/ ⟨bh, (e)abh, mh, (e)amh⟩ and /əj/ ⟨(a)idh, (a)igh⟩ merge with /uː/ and /iː/, respectively, e.g. /ˈl̠ʲanˠuː/ leanbh "baby", /ˈdʲaːnˠuː/ déanamh "make", /ˈsˠauɾˠiː/ samhraidh "summer (gen.)" and /ˈbˠalʲiː/ bailigh "collect". Both merge with /ə/ in Connacht, while in Munster, they are realised [əvˠ] and [əɟ], respectively.
- According to Ó Dochartaigh (1987), the loss of final schwa "is a well-attested feature of Ulster Irish", e.g. [fˠad̪ˠ] for /fˠad̪ˠə/ fada "long".

==== East Ulster and West Ulster ====
Differences between the Western and Eastern sub-dialects of Ulster included the following:

- In West Ulster and most of Ireland, the vowel written ⟨ea⟩ is pronounced [a] (e.g. fear [fʲaɾˠ]), but in East Ulster it was pronounced [ɛ] (e.g. fear /fʲɛɾˠ/ as it is in Scottish Gaelic (/fɛɾ/). J. J. Kneen comments that Scottish Gaelic and Manx generally follow the East Ulster pronunciation. The name Seán is pronounced [ʃɑːnˠ] in Munster and [ʃæːnˠ] in West Ulster, but [ʃeːnˠ] in East Ulster, whence anglicized spellings like Shane O'Neill and Glenshane.
- In East Ulster, ⟨th, ch⟩ in the middle of a word tended to vanish and leave one long syllable. William Neilson wrote that this happens "in most of the counties of Ulster, and the east of Leinster".
- Neilson wrote /w/ was [vˠ], especially at the beginning or end of a word "is still retained in the North of Ireland, as in Scotland, and the Isle of Man", whereas "throughout Connaught, Leinster and some counties of Ulster, the sound of [w] is substituted". However, broad ⟨bh, mh⟩ may become [w] in the middle of a word (for example in leabhar "book").

== Morphology ==
=== Initial mutations ===
Ulster Irish has the same two initial mutations, lenition and eclipsis, as the other two dialects and the standard language, and mostly uses them the same way. There is, however, one exception: in Ulster, a dative singular noun after the definite article is lenited (e.g. ar an chrann "on the tree") (as is the case in Scottish and Manx), whereas in Connacht and Munster, it is eclipsed (ar an gcrann), except in the case of den, don and insan, where lenition occurs in literary language. Both possibilities are allowed for in the standard language.

=== Verbs ===
Irish verbs are characterized by having a mixture of analytic forms (where information about person is provided by a pronoun) and synthetic forms (where information about number is provided in an ending on the verb) in their conjugation. In Ulster and North Connacht the analytic forms are used in a variety of forms where the standard language has synthetic forms, e.g. molann muid "we praise" (standard molaimid, muid being a back formation from the verbal ending -mid and not found in the Munster dialect, which retains sinn as the first person plural pronoun as do Scottish Gaelic and Manx) or mholfadh siad "they would praise" (standard mholfaidís). The synthetic forms, including those no longer emphasised in the standard language, may be used in short answers to questions.

The 2nd conjugation future stem suffix in Ulster is -óch- (pronounced [ah]) rather than -ó-, e.g. beannóchaidh mé [bʲan̪ˠahə mʲə] "I will bless" (standard beannóidh mé [bʲanoːj mʲeː]).

Some irregular verbs have different forms in Ulster from those in the standard language. For example:

- (gh)níom (independent form only) "I do, make" (standard déanaim) and rinn mé "I did, made" (standard rinne mé)
- tchíom [t̠ʲʃiːm] (independent form only) "I see" (standard feicim, Southern chím, cím (independent form only))
- bheiream "I give" (standard tugaim, southern bheirim (independent only)), ní thabhram or ní thugaim "I do not give" (standard only ní thugaim), and bhéarfaidh mé/bheirfidh mé "I will give" (standard tabharfaidh mé, southern bhéarfad(independent form only))
- gheibhim (independent form only) "I get" (standard faighim), ní fhaighim "I do not get"
- abraim "I say, speak" (standard deirim, ní abraim "I do not say, speak", although deir is used to mean "I say" in a more general sense.)

=== Particles ===
In Ulster the negative particle cha (before a vowel chan, in past tenses char - Scottish Gaelic/Manx chan, cha do) is sometimes used where other dialects use ní and níor. The form is more common in the north of the Donegal Gaeltacht. Cha cannot be followed by the future tense: where it has a future meaning, it is followed by the habitual present. It triggers a "mixed mutation": /t/ and /d/ are eclipsed, while other consonants are lenited. In some dialects however (Gweedore), cha eclipses all consonants, except b- in the forms of the verb "to be", and sometimes f-:

Ulster	Standard	English
Cha dtuigim	Ní thuigim	"I don't understand"
Chan fhuil sé/Cha bhfuil sé	Níl sé (contracted from ní fhuil sé)	"He isn't"
Cha bhíonn sé	Ní bheidh sé	"He will not be"
Cha phógann muid/Cha bpógann muid	Ní phógaimid	"We do not kiss"
Chan ólfadh siad é	Ní ólfaidís é	"They wouldn't drink it"
Char thuig mé thú	Níor thuig mé thú	"I didn't understand you"

In the Past Tense, some irregular verbs are lenited/eclipsed in the Interrogative/Negative that differ from the standard, due to the various particles that may be preferred:

Interrogative	Negative	English
An raibh tú?	Cha raibh mé	"I was not"
An dtearn tú?	Cha dtearn mé	"I did not do, make"
An dteachaigh tú?	Cha dteachaigh mé	"I did not go"
An dtáinig tú?	Cha dtáinig mé	"I did not come"
An dtug tú?	Cha dtug mé	"I did not give"
Ar chuala tú?	Char chuala mé	"I did not hear"
Ar dhúirt tú?	Char dhúirt mé	"I did not say"
An bhfuair tú?	Chan fhuair mé	"I did not get"
Ar rug tú?	Char rug mé	"I did not catch, bear"
Ar ith tú?	Char ith mé	"I did not eat"
Ar chígh tú/An bhfaca tú?	Chan fhaca mé	"I did not see"

== Syntax ==
The Ulster dialect uses the present tense of the subjunctive mood in certain cases where other dialects prefer to use the future indicative:

Suigh síos anseo ag mo thaobh, a Shéimí, go dtugaidh (dtabhairidh, dtabhraidh) mé comhairle duit agus go n-insidh mé mo scéal duit.
Sit down here by my side, Jamie, till I give you some advice and tell you my story.

The verbal noun can be used in subordinate clauses with a subject different from that of the main clause:

Ba mhaith liom thú a ghabháil ann.
I would like you to go there.

== Lexicon ==
The Ulster dialect contains many words not used in other dialects—of which the main ones are Connacht Irish and Munster Irish—or used otherwise only in northeast Connacht. The standard form of written Irish is now An Caighdeán Oifigiúil. In other cases, a semantic shift has resulted in quite different meanings attaching to the same word in Ulster Irish and in other dialects. Some of these words include:

- ag déanamh is used to mean "to think" as well as "to make" or "to do", síleann, ceapann and cuimhníonn is used in other dialects, as well as in Ulster Irish.
- amharc or amhanc (West Ulster), "look" (elsewhere amharc, breathnaigh and féach; this latter means rather "try" or "attempt" in Ulster)
- barúil "opinion", southern tuairim - in Ulster, tuairim is most typically used in the meaning "approximate value", such as tuairim an ama sin "about that time". Note the typically Ulster derivatives barúlach and inbharúla "of the opinion (that...)".
- bealach, ród "road" (southern and western bóthar and ród (cf. Scottish Gaelic rathad, Manx raad), and bealach "way"). Note that bealach alone is used as a preposition meaning "towards" (literally meaning "in the way of": d'amharc sé bealach na farraige = "he looked towards the sea"). In the sense "road", Ulster Irish often uses bealach mór (lit. "big road") even for roads that aren't particularly big or wide.
- bomaite, "minute" (elsewhere nóiméad, nóimint, neómat, etc., and in Mayo Gaeltacht areas a somewhat halfway version between the northern and southern versions, is the word "móiméad", also probably the original, from which the initial M diverged into a similar nasal N to the south, and into a similar bilabial B to the north.)
- cá huair, "when?" (Connacht cén uair; Munster cathain, cén uair)
- caidé (cad é) atá?, "what is?" (Connacht céard tá; Munster cad a thá, cad é a thá, dé a thá, Scottish Gaelic dé tha)
- cál, "cabbage" (southern gabáiste; Scottish Gaelic càl)
- caraidh, "weir" (Connacht cara, standard cora)
- cluinim, "I hear" (southern cloisim, but cluinim is also attested in South Tipperary and is also used in Achill and Erris in North and West Mayo). In fact, the initial c- tends to be lenited even when it is not preceded by any particle (this is because there was a leniting particle in Classical Irish: do-chluin yielded chluin in Ulster)
- doiligh, "hard"-as in difficult (southern deacair), crua "tough"
- druid, "close" (southern and western dún; in other dialects druid means "to move in relation to or away from something", thus druid ó rud = to shirk, druid isteach = to close in) although druid is also used in Achill and Erris
- eallach, "cattle" (southern beithíoch = "one head of cattle", beithígh = "cattle", "beasts")
- eiteogaí, "wings" (southern sciatháin)
- fá, "about, under" (standard faoi, Munster fé, fí and fá is only used for "under"; mar gheall ar and i dtaobh = "about"; fá dtaobh de = "about" or "with regard to")
- falsa, "lazy" (southern and western leisciúil, fallsa = "false, treacherous") although falsa is also used in Achill and Erris
- faoileog, "seagull" (standard faoileán)
- fosta, "also" (standard freisin)
- Gaeilg, Gaeilig, Gaedhlag, Gaeilic, "Irish" (standard and Western Gaeilge, Southern Gaoluinn, Manx Gaelg, Scottish Gaelic Gàidhlig) although Gaeilg is used in Achill and was used in parts of Erris and East Connacht
- geafta, "gate" (standard geata)
- gairid, "short" (southern gearr)
- gamhain, "calf" (southern lao and gamhain) although gamhain is also used in Achill and Erris
- gasúr, "boy" (southern garsún; garsún means "child" in Connemara)
- girseach, "girl" (southern gearrchaile and girseach)
- gnóitheach, "busy" (standard gnóthach)
- inteacht, an adjective meaning "some" or "certain" is used instead of the southern éigin. Áirithe also means "certain" or "particular".
- mothaím is used to mean "I hear, perceive" as well as "I feel" (standard cloisim) but mothaím generally refers to stories or events. The only other place where mothaím is used in this context is in the Irish of Dún Caocháin and Ceathrú Thaidhg in Erris but it was a common usage throughout most of northern and eastern Mayo, Sligo, Leitrim and North Roscommon
- nighean, "daughter" (standard iníon; Scottish Gaelic nighean)
- nuaidheacht, "news" (standard nuacht, but note that even Connemara has nuaíocht)
- sópa, "soap" (standard gallúnach, Connemara gallaoireach)
- stócach, "youth", "young man", "boyfriend" (Southern = "gangly, young lad")
- tábla, "table" (western and southern bord and clár, Scottish Gaelic bòrd)
- tig liom is used to mean "I can" as opposed to the standard is féidir liom or the southern tá mé in ann. Tá mé ábalta is also a preferred Ulster variant. Tig liom and its derivatives are also commonly used in the Irish of Joyce Country, Achill and Erris
- the word iontach "wonderful" is used as an intensifier instead of the prefix an- used in other dialects.

Words generally associated with the now dead East Ulster Irish include:

- airigh (feel, hear, perceive) - but also known in more southern Irish dialects
- ársuigh, more standardized ársaigh (tell) - but note the expression ag ársaí téamaí "telling stories, spinning yearns" used by the modern Ulster writer Séamus Ó Grianna.
- coinfheascar (evening)
- corruighe, more standardized spelling corraí (anger)
- frithir (sore)
- go seadh (yet)
- márt (cow)
- práinn (hurry)
- toigh (house)
- tonnóg (duck)

In other cases, a semantic shift has resulted in quite different meanings attaching to the same word in Ulster Irish and in other dialects. Some of these words include:

- cloigeann "head" (southern and western ceann; elsewhere, cloigeann is used to mean "skull")
- capall "mare" (southern and western láir; elsewhere, capall means "horse")

== Notable speakers ==
Some notable Irish singers who sing in the Ulster Irish dialect include Maighread Ní Dhomhnaill, Mairéad Ní Mhaonaigh, Róise Mhic Ghrianna, Máire Ní Bhraonáin (aka Moya Brennan of the band Clannad), Moya's sister Eithne Ní Bhraonáin (aka Enya), and Pádraigín Ní Uallacháin.

Notable Ulster Irish writers include Micí Mac Gabhann, Seosamh Mac Grianna, Peadar Toner Mac Fhionnlaoich, Cosslett Ó Cuinn, Niall Ó Dónaill, Séamus Ó Grianna, Brian Ó Nualláin, Colette Ní Ghallchóir and Cathal Ó Searcaigh.

== See also ==
- Irish language
- Gaeltacht
- Irish language in Northern Ireland

== Bibliography ==
- Hamilton, John Noel (1974). A Phonetic Study of the Irish of Tory Island, Co. Donegal. Studies in Irish Language and Literature. Vol. 3. Belfast: Institute of Irish Studies, Queen's University of Belfast.
- Hodgins, Tom (2013). Dea-Chaint John Ghráinne agus a chairde (in Irish). Baile Átha Cliath: Coiscéim.
- Hughes, A. J. (2009). An Ghaeilge ó Lá go Lá - Irish Day by Day. Belfast: Ben Madigan Press. ISBN 978-0-9542834-6-9. (book & 2 CDs in the Ulster dialect)
- —— (2016). Basic Irish Conversation and Grammar - Bunchomhrá Gaeilge agus Gramadach. Belfast: Ben Madigan Press. ISBN 978-0-9542834-9-0. (book & 2 CDs in the Ulster dialect)
- Hughes, Art (1994). "Gaeilge Uladh". In McCone, Kim (ed.). Stair na Gaeilge (in Irish). Maigh Nuad: Roinn na Sean-Ghaeilge, Coláiste Phádraig.
- Lucas, Leslie W. (1979). Grammar of Ros Goill Irish, Co. Donegal. Studies in Irish Language and Literature. Vol. 5. Belfast: Institute of Irish Studies, Queen's University of Belfast.
- Lúcás, Leaslaoi U. (1986). de Bhaldraithe, Tomás (ed.). Cnuasach focal as Ros Goill. Deascán Foclóireachta (in Irish). Vol. 5. Baile Átha Cliath: Acadamh Ríoga na hÉireann.
- Mac Congáil, Nollaig (1983). Scríbhneoirí Thír Chonaill (in Irish). Baile Átha Cliath: Foilseacháin Náisiúnta Teoranta.
- Mac Maoláin, Seán (1933). Cora Cainnte as Tír Ċonaill (in Irish). Baile Áṫa Cliaṫ: Oifig Díolta Foillseaċáin Rialtais.
- Ní Chasaide, Ailbhe (1999). "Irish". Handbook of the International Phonetic Association. Cambridge University Press. pp. 111–16. ISBN 0-521-63751-1.
- Ó Baoill, Colm (1978). Contributions to a Comparative Study of Ulster Irish & Scottish Gaelic. Studies in Irish Language and Literature. Vol. 4. Belfast: Institute of Irish Studies, Queen's University of Belfast.
- Ó Baoill, Dónall P. (1996). An Teanga Bheo: Gaeilge Uladh (in Irish). Institiúid Teangeolaíochta Éireann. ISBN 0-946452-85-7.
- Ó Corráin, Ailbhe (1989). A Concordance of Idiomatic Expressions in the Writings of Seamus Ó Grianna. Belfast: Institute of Irish Studies, Queen's University of Belfast.
- Ó Dónaill, Niall (1977). Foclóir Gaeilge-Béarla. Dublin: Oifig an tSoláthair.
- Ó Dochartaigh, Cathair (1987). Dialects of Ulster Irish. Studies in Irish Language and Literature. Vol. 7. Belfast: Institute of Irish Studies, Queen's University of Belfast.
- Ó Duibhín, Ciarán (1997). "The Irish Language in County Down". In Proudfoot, L J (ed.). Down: History & Society. Geography Publications.
- Ó hAirt, Diarmuid, ed. (1993). "Cnuasach Conallach: A Computerized Dictionary of Donegal Irish" (in Irish). Archived from the original on 14 June 2022.
- Ó hEochaidh, Seán (1955). Sean-chainnt Theilinn (in Irish). Baile Átha Cliath: Institiúid Ard-Léighinn Bhaile Átha Cliath.
- Uí Bheirn, Úna M. (1989). de Bhaldraithe, Tomás (ed.). Cnuasach Focal as Teileann. Deascán Foclóireachta (in Irish). Vol. 8. Baile Átha Cliath: Acadamh Ríoga na hÉireann.
- Wagner, Heinrich (1959). Gaeilge Theilinn: Foghraidheacht, Gramadach, Téacsanna (in Irish). Baile Átha Cliath: Institiúid Árd-Léinn Bhaile Átha Cliath.
- —— (1958). Linguistic Atlas and Survey of Irish Dialects. Vol. I. Introduction, 300 maps. Dublin: Dublin Institute for Advanced Studies. ISBN 0-901282-05-7.
- ——; Ó Baoill, Colm (1969). Linguistic Atlas and Survey of Irish Dialects. Vol. IV. The Dialects of Ulster and the Isle of Man, Specimens of Scottish Gaelic Dialects, Phonetic Texts of East Ulster Irish. Dublin: Dublin Institute for Advanced Studies. ISBN 0-901282-05-7.

== Literature ==
- Hodgins, Tom (2007). 'Rhetoric of Beauty': An Slabhra gan Bhriseadh - Filíocht, Seanchas agus Cuimhní Cinn as Rann na Feirste (in Irish). Baile Átha Cliath: Coiscéim. [Rannafast]
- Mac a' Bhaird, Proinsias (2002). Cogar san Fharraige. Scéim na Scol in Árainn Mhóir, 1937-1938 (in Irish). Baile Átha Cliath: Coiscéim. [folklore, Arranmore Island]
- Mac Cionaoith, Maeleachlainn (2005). Seanchas Rann na Feirste: Is fann guth an éin a labhras leis féin (in Irish). Baile Átha Cliath: Coiscéim. [folklore, Rannafast]
- Mac Cumhaill, Fionn (1974). Gura Slán le m'Óige (in Irish). Baile Átha Cliath: Oifig an tSoláthair. [novel, the Rosses]
- —— (1997). Na Rosa go Brách (in Irish). Baile Átha Cliath: An Gúm. [novel, the Rosses]
- —— (1998). Slán Leat, a Mhaicín. Úrscéal do Dhaoine Óga (in Irish). Baile Átha Cliath: An Gúm. [novel, the Rosses]
- Mac Fhionnlaoich, Seán (1983). Scéal Ghaoth Dobhair (in Irish). Baile Átha Cliath: Foilseacháin Náisiúnta Teoranta. [local history, Gweedore]
- Mac Gabhann, Micí; Ó hEochaidh, Seán (1959). Ó Conluain, Proinsias (ed.). Rotha Mór an tSaoil (in Irish). Baile Átha Cliath: Foilseacháin Náisiúnta Teoranta. [autobiography, Ulster]
- Mac Giolla Domhnaigh, Gearóid; Stockman, Gearóid, eds. (1991). Athchló Uladh (in Irish). Comhaltas Uladh. [folklore, East Ulster: Antrim, Rathlin Island]
- Mac Giolla Easbuic, Mícheál, ed. (2008). Ón tSeanam Anall: Scéalta Mhicí Bháin Uí Bheirn (in Irish). Indreabhán: Cló Iar-Chonnachta. [Kilcar]
- Mac Grianna, Seosamh (1936). Pádraic Ó Conaire agus Aistí Eile (in Irish). Baile Átha Cliath: Oifig Díolta Foillseacháin Rialtais. [essays, the Rosses]
- —— (1940). Mo Bhealach Féin agus Dá mBíodh Ruball ar an Éan (in Irish). Baile Átha Cliath: Oifig an tSoláthair. [autobiography, unfinished novel, the Rosses]
- —— (1969). An Druma Mór (in Irish). Baile Átha Cliath: Oifig an tSoláthair. [novel, the Rosses]
- MacLennan, Gordon W. (1997). Harrison, Alan; Crook, Máiri Elena (eds.). Seanchas Annie Bhán: The Lore of Annie Bhán (in Irish and English). Translated by Harrison, Alan; Crook, Máiri Elena. Seanchas Annie Bhán Publication Committee. ISBN 1898473846. [folklore, Rannafast]
- —— (1940). Ó Cnáimhsí, Séamus (ed.). Mám as mo mhála (in Irish). Baile Átha Cliath: Oifig an tSoláthair. [short stories]
- Mac Meanman, Seán Bán (1989). —— (ed.). Cnuasach Céad Conlach (in Irish). Baile Átha Cliath: Coiscéim. [folklore]
- —— (1990). —— (ed.). An Chéad Mhám (in Irish). Baile Átha Cliath: Coiscéim. [short stories]
- —— (1992). —— (ed.). An Tríú Mám (in Irish). Baile Átha Cliath: Coiscéim. [essays]
- Mac Seáin, Pádraig (1973). Ceolta Theilinn. Studies in Irish Language and Literature. Vol. 1. Belfast: Institute of Irish Studies, Queen's University of Belfast.
- McGlinchey, Charles; Kavanagh, Patrick (2002). Kavanagh, Desmond; Mac Congáil, Nollaig (eds.). An Fear Deireanach den tSloinneadh (in Irish). Galway: Arlen House. [autobiography, Inishowen]
- Ní Bhaoill, Róise, ed. (2010). Ulster Gaelic Voices: Bailiúchán Doegen 1931 (in Irish and English). Béal Feirste: Iontaobhas Ultach.
- Nic Aodháin, Medhbh Fionnuala, ed. (1993). Báitheadh iadsan agus tháinig mise (in Irish). Baile Átha Cliath: Coiscéim. [legends, Tyrconnell]
- Nic Giolla Bhríde, Cáit (1996). Stairsheanchas Ghaoth Dobhair (in Irish). Baile Átha Cliath: Coiscéim. [history, folklore, memoirs, the Rosses]
- Ó Baoighill, Pádraig (1993). An Coileach Troda agus scéalta eile (in Irish). Baile Átha Cliath: Coiscéim. [short stories, the Rosses]
- —— (1994). Cuimhní ar Dhochartaigh Ghleann Fhinne (in Irish). Baile Átha Cliath: Coiscéim. [biography, essays, the Rosses]
- —— (1994). Óglach na Rosann : Niall Pluincéad Ó Baoighill (in Irish). Baile Átha Cliath: Coiscéim. [life story, the Rosses]
- —— (1998). Nally as Maigh Eo (in Irish). Baile Átha Cliath: Coiscéim. [biography, the Rosses]
- —— (2000). Gaeltacht Thír Chonaill - Ó Ghleann go Fánaid (in Irish). Baile Átha Cliath: Coiscéim. [local tradition, the Rosses]
- ——; Ó Baoill, Mánus, eds. (2001). Amhráin Hiúdaí Fheilimí agus Laoithe Fiannaíochta as Rann na Feirste (in Irish). Muineachán: Preas Uladh.
- —— (2001). Srathóg Feamnaí agus Scéalta Eile (in Irish). Baile Átha Cliath: Coiscéim. [short stories, the Rosses]
- —— (2003). Ceann Tìre/Earraghàidheal: Ár gComharsanaigh Ghaelacha (in Irish). Baile Átha Cliath: Coiscéim. [travel book]
- —— (2004). Gasúr Beag Bhaile na gCreach (in Irish). Baile Átha Cliath: Coiscéim.
- ——, ed. (2005). Faoi Scáth na Mucaise: Béaloideas Ghaeltachtaí Imeallacha Thír Chonaill (in Irish). Baile Átha Cliath: Coiscéim.
- Ó Baoill, Dónall P., ed. (1992). Amach as Ucht na Sliabh (in Irish). Vol. 1. Cumann Staire agus Seanchais Ghaoth Dobhair.
- ——, ed. (1996). Amach as Ucht na Sliabh (in Irish). Vol. 2. Cumann Staire agus Seanchais Ghaoth Dobhair i gcomhar le Comharchumann Forbartha Ghaoth Dobhair. [folklore, Gweedore] [folklore, Gweedore]
- Ó Baoill, Micí Sheáin Néill (1956). Mag Uidhir, Seosamh (ed.). Maith Thú, A Mhicí (in Irish). Béal Feirste: Irish News Teoranta. [folklore, Rannafast]
- Ó Baoill, Micí Sheáin Néill (1983). Ó Searcaigh, Lorcán (ed.). Lá De na Laethaibh (in Irish). Muineachán: Cló Oirghialla. [folklore, Rannafast]
- Ó Colm, Eoghan (1971). Toraigh na dTonn (in Irish). Baile Átha Cliath: Foilseacháin Náisiúnta Teoranta. [memoirs and local history, Tory Island/Magheroarty]
- Ó Cuinn, Cosslett (1990). Ó Canainn, Aodh; Watson, Seosamh (eds.). Scian A Caitheadh le Toinn : Scéalta agus amhráin as Inis Eoghain agus cuimhne ar Ghaeltacht Iorrais (in Irish). Baile Átha Cliath: Coiscéim. [folklore, Tír Eoghain]
- Ó Donaill, Eoghan (1940). Scéal Hiúdaí Sheáinín (in Irish). Baile Átha Cliath: Oifig an tSoláthair. [biography, folklore, the Rosses]
- Ó Donaill, Niall (1942). Seanchas na Féinne (in Irish). Baile Átha Cliath: Oifig an tSoláthair. [mythology, the Rosses]
- —— (1974). Na Glúnta Rosannacha (in Irish). Baile Átha Cliath: Oifig an tSoláthair. [local history, the Rosses]
- Ó Duibheannaigh, John Ghráinne (2008). An áit a n-ólann an t-uan an bainne (in Irish). Béal Feirste: Cló na Seaneagliase. ISBN 978-0-9558388-0-4. [Rannafast] (book & 1 CD in the Ulster dialect)
- Ó Gallachóir, Pádraig (2008). Seachrán na Mic Uí gCorra (in Irish). Baile Átha Cliath: Coiscéim. [novel]
- Ó Gallchóir, Tomás (1996). Séimidh agus Scéalta Eile (in Irish). Baile Átha Cliath: Coiscéim. [the Rosses]
- Ó Grianna, Séamus (1924). Caisleáin Óir (in Irish). Sráid Bhaile Dúin Dealgan: Preas Dhún Dealgan. [novel, the Rosses]
- —— (1942). Nuair a Bhí Mé Óg (in Irish). Baile Átha Cliath: Clólucht an Talbóidigh. [autobiography, the Rosses]
- —— (1961). Cúl le Muir agus Scéalta Eile (in Irish). Baile Átha Cliath: Oifig an tSoláthair. [short stories, the Rosses]
- —— (1968). An Sean-Teach (in Irish). Baile Átha Cliath: Oifig an tSoláthair. [novel, the Rosses]
- —— (1976). Cith is Dealán (in Irish). Corcaigh: Cló Mercier. [short stories the Rosses]
- —— (1983). Tairngreacht Mhiseoige (in Irish). Baile Átha Cliath: An Gúm. [novel, the Rosses]
- —— (1993). Cora Cinniúna (in Irish). Baile Átha Cliath: An Gúm. ISBN 1-85791-0737. [short stories, the Rosses]
- —— (2002). Mac Congáil, Nollaig (ed.). Castar na Daoine ar a Chéile. Scríbhinní Mháire (in Irish). Vol. 1. Baile Átha Cliath: Coiscéim. [novel, the Rosses]
- —— (2003). — (ed.). Na Blianta Corracha. Scríbhinní Mháire (in Irish). Vol. 2. Baile Átha Cliath: Coiscéim. [the Rosses]
- Ó Laighin, Donnchadh C. (2004). An Bealach go Dún Ulún (in Irish). Baile Átha Cliath: Coiscéim. ISBN 978-1-9024208-2-0. [Kilcar]
- Ó Muirgheasa, Énrí (1907). Seanfhocla Uladh (in Irish). Baile Átha Cliath: Connradh na Gaedhilge. [folklore]
- Ó Searcaigh, Cathal (1993). An Bealach 'na Bhaile. Indreabhán: Cló Iar-Chonnachta.
- —— (2004). Seal i Neipeal (in Irish). Indreabhán: Cló Iar-Chonnachta. ISBN 1902420608. [travel book, Gortahork]
- Ó Searcaigh, Séamus (1945). Laochas: Scéalta as an tSeanlitríocht (in Irish). Baile Átha Cliath: An Gúm. [mythology, the Rosses]
- —— (1997). Beatha Cholm Cille (in Irish). Baile Átha Cliath: An Gúm. [the Rosses]
- Ua Cnáimhsí, Pádraig (1997). Grae, Micheál (ed.). Idir an Dá Ghaoth: Scéal Mhuintir na Rosann (in Irish). Baile Átha Cliath: Sáirséal Ó Marcaigh. ISBN 0-86289-073-X. [local history, the Rosses]
