= Aoife Ní Bhriain =

Irish violinist

- Born: Aoife Mairead O'Brien; Bayside, Dublin, Ireland
- Genres: Classical; Folk; Traditional Irish
- Occupations: Musician; TV Presenter
- Instruments: J.B. Vuillaume violin (c. 1850); J. Manthey violin (c. 2010); S. Rørlien Hardanger fiddle (2018); J.A Vigneron bow (c. 1900)
- Years active: 2010s–present
- Label: Independent
- Spouse: Patrick Flanaghan (m. 2022)
- Parents: Mick O'Brien (father); Fidelma O'Brien (mother)
- Relatives: Dinny O'Brien (grandfather); John O'Brien (uncle); Donncha Ó Briain (uncle)

Aoife Mairead O'Brien (Irish: Aoife Máiréad Ní Bhriain) is an Irish violinist from North Dublin. She plays musical genres including classical, traditional, jazz and contemporary music. She has received awards in both the classical and traditional world, including a Gradam Ceoil TG4 Musical Collaboration Award for her work with the Goodman Trio, and a RTÉ Radio 1 Folk Award for Best Folk Instrumentalist. Aoife has been described as "one of the most versatile musicians of her generation" and "an exceptionally talented and multifaceted violinist".

== Early life ==
Aoife Ní Bhriain was born into a musical family in Bayside, a suburb of North Dublin, Ireland. Her father, Mick O'Brien, is an uilleann piper and schoolteacher from a well-known traditional Irish music family in Artane, Dublin. In 2023, he was awarded the highest accolade in traditional Irish music: the Gradam Ceoil TG4 Musician of the Year. Aoife's mother, Fidelma O'Brien, is a banjo player and music teacher, who comes from a large family of Irish dancers and musicians. Her mother taught music to many of the children on their street, Verbena Grove, which produced musicians included the Lyons brothers of The Bonny Men and the Peat family who are cousins of Radie Peat of Lankum.

Inspired by her neighbour Joanne Peat, Aoife began learning fiddle at just 2 years of age, as well as learning to play the concertina. Aoife has two younger siblings, Ciara who plays the fiddle, viola and harp, and Cormac who plays the fiddle and cello. Many of Aoife's extended family were also traditional players, including her maternal grandfather, Don (drums), paternal grandfather, Dinny O'Brien (button accordion), and her uncles, John O'Brien (uilleann pipes), Donncha Ó Briain (tin whistle) and Tom and Andrew O'Brien (fiddle).

Aoife went on to study classical violin at the Young European Strings School of Music with teachers Maria Kelemen and Ronald Masin. She also studied with Maeve Broderick at the Royal Irish Academy of Music in Dublin. In 2006, Aoife studied under Prof. Constantin Serban in the Conservatoire de la Région in Nantes, France where she completed her Diplôme d'Etudes Musicales (DEM) in violin performance.

In 2009, Aoife completed her Leaving Certificate at Gaelcholáiste Reachrann, an Irish-speaking secondary school in Donaghmede, North Dublin. Aoife studied for her bachelor's degree under the supervision of Prof. Mariana Sîrbu in Leipzig. She then studied for her master's degree with Prof. Carolin Widmann at the Hochschule fur Musik und Theater, Leipzig, graduating with first-class honours in 2018.

== Career ==
As a traditional Irish musician, Aoife has been involved in numerous solo and collaborative projects. She has performed with artists such as fiddle player Martin Hayes and Scottish singer Julie Fowlis. She is part of the Goodman Trio, along with her father and Emer Mayock (flute) with whom she has explored music that originated in the southwest of Ireland in the mid-nineteenth century, collected by musicologist Canon James Goodman. Aoife has recorded two albums with the Goodman Trio: Tunes from the Goodman Manuscripts (2013), for which they received a Gradam Ceoil TG4 Musical Collaboration Award in 2014, and More Tunes from the Goodman Manuscripts (2021).

In 2021, Aoife was featured on the Drawing from the Well series hosted by the Irish Traditional Music Archive, where she spoke about her work transcribing the work of Dublin fiddler and influence Tommy Potts. In 2023, Aoife released a collaborative album with Welsh harpist Catrin Finch, Double You, which topped the World Music Charts Europe in December 2023. In 2024, Aoife was honoured for her contribution to Irish traditional music, winning the Best Folk Instrumentalist at the RTÉ Radio 1 Folk Awards.

== Instruments ==
Aoife plays a 19th-century violin by Jean-Baptiste Vuillaume (Guarneri reproduction) made in Paris, France, c. 1850 (on loan) and a Jürgen Manthey violin made in Leipzig, Germany, c. 2010 (purchased through the Music Network Music Capital Scheme). Her bow is a Joseph Arthur Vigneron bow made in Paris, France, c. 1900 (purchased through an award from Music Network Ireland). Aoife also plays a Hardanger fiddle made by Sigvald Rørlien in the Ole Bull Academy, Vossevangen, Norway in 2018 and features drawings by Wiebke Lüders.

== Personal life ==
In 2022, Aoife married oboist Patrick Flanaghan who is Principal Cor Anglais with the Royal Philharmonic Orchestra and teaches Cor Anglais at the Royal Academy of Music and the Royal Welsh College of Music & Drama. In 2024, they collaborated with the Orlando Philharmonic Orchestra String Quartet, to perform a program that combines their backgrounds in classical and Irish music.

== Discography ==
Albums

- Tunes from the Goodman Manuscripts (with Goodman Trio) (2013)
- Five Seasons (with Birkin Tree) (2019)
- Landscapes, Knives & Glue: Radiohead's Kid A Recycled (with Wooden Elephant) (2021)
- More Tunes from the Goodman Manuscripts (with Goodman Trio) (2021)
- Double You (with Catrin Finch) (2023)
- Cosán Casta (with Cormac McCarthy) (2025)

Guest appearances

- Irish Minimalism (by Dave Flynn) (2021)

== Awards and nominations ==
Aoife has won various competitions and awards in the classical genre, including the Prix D'Or for exceptional students from the Conservatoire de Pays de la Loire, Nantes in 2006, the Camerata Ireland Young Musician of the Year Award in 2011, Campus Internazionale da Musica, Pontino Festival Young Musician Award, 2nd Prize at the Marie Cantagrill International Violin Competition in 2014, 3rd Prize at the Vasco Abadjiev International Violin Competition in 2015 as well as qualifying for the semi finals of the International Johann Sebastian Bach Competition in 2022.

Aoife's traditional Irish music performances have won her seven All Ireland titles at the Fleadh Cheoil, The Fiddler of Dooney in 2009, the Bonn Óir Seán Ó Riada in 2010, various Feis Ceoil awards, a Gradam Ceoil TG4 award with the Goodman Trio in 2014, a Next Generation Award from the Arts Council of Ireland and an RTÉ Radio 1 Folk Award for Best Folk Instrumentalist in 2024.

=== Gradam Ceoil TG4 ===
Year	Nominee / work	Award	Result
2014	Goodman Trio	Musical Collaboration Award	Won

=== RTÉ Radio 1 Folk Awards ===
Year	Nominee / work	Award	Result
2024	Aoife Ní Bhriain	Best Folk Instrumentalist	Won
