= Antrim Irish =

Dialect of the Irish language

- Antrim Gaelic; East Ulster Irish; East Ulster Gaelic
- Gaedhilc
- Native to: Ireland
- Region: Ulster
- Ethnicity: Irish people
- Extinct: February 1983, with the death of Séamus Bhriain Mac Amhlaig (Glens Dialect); 2012, with the death of Alex Morrison (Rathlin Dialect)
- Language family: Indo-European: Celtic; Insular Celtic; Goidelic; Ulster Irish; Antrim Irish
- Early forms: Proto-Indo-European: Proto-Celtic; Proto-Goidelic; Primitive Irish; Old Irish; Middle Irish; Early Modern Irish; Modern Irish
- Dialects: Rathlin Island †; Glens †
- Writing system: Latin (Irish alphabet); Irish Braille

Language codes
- ISO 639-3: –
- Glottolog: None
- County Antrim

The Antrim dialect is an extinct dialect of Ulster Irish formerly spoken in County Antrim. There are two confirmed sub-dialects of Antrim Gaelic: The Glens dialect and the Rathlin dialect. There is evidence to assume that Antrim Irish as it was spoken in South Antrim could have been linguistically distinct enough to form its own sub-dialect, due to the possible influence of the separate kingdom of Clann Aodha Buidhe that formed what is now South County Antrim and North County Down . The linguistic records, however, are sparse, and are almost exclusively literary or poetic sources which do not fully reflect local speech.

The Glens dialect became extinct in February 1983 following the death of Séamus Bhriain Mac Amhlaig.

The Rathlin Dialect became extinct in 2012, following the death of Alex Morrison.

Since the dialect survived into the 20th century, it is well attested in records such as the Doegen Recordings.

== Features of the Glens dialect ==
The Glens dialect shows many features typical of Scottish Gaelic (Gàidhlig) while retaining a majority of Irish features too.

=== Grammar and Vocabulary ===
Some examples of Scottish Influence in grammar and vocabulary are: the use of Bhá (standard Irish Bhí also used) as the past tense form of the verb 'Bí' (to be); the exclusive use of cha(n) or char as the negative form of the verb Bí, alongside copula forms cha (dual), chan (mhaith liom), char (mhaith liom), charbh (fhéidir) and so on; the use of the negative present-habitual tense to express the negative future tense, such as cha bhím (standard Irish ní bheidh); the use of anns an / anns a' for 'in the' (standard Irish sa, san and Ulster Irish ins an) and the use of ann an (standard Irish i(n)) as in ann an Íle 'in Islay'. There are more not here listed.

Some examples of shared words between Antrim Irish and Scottish Gaelic are: air folamh, 'away' (Sc. Gaelic air folbh) chan urra 'can't help (doing something)' (Sc. Gaelic chan urrainn 'cannot'), glé mhaith 'very good' (Sc. Gaelic glè mhath), tol 'going' (Sc. Gaelic dol, standard Irish dul), caoinnigh 'to expose to sun to dry' (Sc. Gaelic caoinnich). The main source of Glens vocabulary comes from words provided by Aoidhmhín mac Gréagóir in the second edition of Dineen's Foclóir Gaedhilge agus Béarla (1927).

=== Phonology ===
The phonology of Antrim Gaelic is distinguished by the following main characteristics: the raising of ai (standard Irish pronunciation: [ɑ]) to [ɛ]; ao realised as [ö] (as in Islay Gaelic); aoi realised as [I:] and diphthongised as in naoi; ea historically realised as [ɛ] as seen in placenames (Benmore from Irish Beann mór 'big cliff'); final á and í shortened, as seen in the local pronunciation of cailean (standard Irish cailín) or tógáil (pronounced similar to tógail); the reduction of final -(a)idh, to the irrational vowel [ə] or an extremely short -ee; and the pronunciation of ai after a palatal consonant as [ɔ] as in Barra.

=== Distinction from West Donegal Irish ===
The main characteristics distinguishing Glens Irish from Donegal Irish, were as follows, according to Nils Holmer in his book On some relics of the Irish dialect spoken in the Glens of Antrim: (1) the pronunciation of ai after a palatal consonant as [ɔ]; (2) the long sound of ao is still [ʎ:] (or ö); (3) the sound of io and oi (which may be called the short ao-sound) is a very wide e-sound (normally [ɛ] or [E]); (4) no marked distinction exists between a wide and a narrow o sound; (5) the pronunciation of short ea as ɛ before d, s and g; (6) the lengthening of originally short ea to éa (not eá, as in Donegal); (7) the disappearance of intervocalic th (whereas th unvoices an adjoining r or n, as in Donegal).

Recordings of Glens Irish, such as those recorded by Wilhelm Doegen and Karl Tempel, give us a clearer understanding of these phonological changes.

== Features of the Rathlin dialect ==
The Rathlin dialect is markedly more 'Scottish' than any other Gaelic dialect in Ireland, and it was debated for a long time whether the Rathlin dialect was in fact an Irish or Scottish dialect. Scholars now tend to agree that the Irish language as it was spoken in Rathlin Island was an Irish dialect heavily influenced by the neighbouring Scottish dialects in Argyll and Innse Gall.

=== Grammar and Vocabulary ===
The clearest distinguishing characteristic of Rathlin Irish is that plurals are formed in the typically Scottish manner of adding -(e)an to the end of nouns. Certain masculine nouns share similar conjugation patterns to both Irish Gaelic and Scottish Gaelic, such the change from each (singular) to eich (plural). Other features that show Scottish influence are the appearance of gon robh (standard Irish go raibh) and gos leor (standard Irish, go leor) and the formation of the negative past tense with cha do (standard Irish níor), for example cha d'fhuair mé (standard Irish ní bhfuair).

Rathlin and Glens Irish were both mutually intelligible with one another, as shown by the around 300 words provided by Aoidhmhín mac Gréagóir in Dineen's second edition of Foclóir Gaedhilge agus Béarla (1927) that are listed as words from 'Antrim and Rathlin'. There were a number of Rathlin peculiarities listed by mac Gréagóir, however, such as: cha b'urrainn 'could not' (Glens cha b'urra, Sc. Gaelic cha b'urrainn), coltach 'similar' (Sc. Gaelic coltach), cosaigh 'to walk' (Glens siúil, Sc. Gaelic coisich); and many more not here listed.

=== Relation to Glens Irish ===
As per the list related above, in regards to the distinction between Glens Irish and West Donegal Irish, Nils M. Holmer states that Rathlin Irish agrees with Glens Irish on four of the seven points, i.e., points 3, 5, 6 and 7.

== Conservation and Protection ==
Antrim Irish, in the Glens and in Rathlin, was subject to a heavy conservation and protection effort that was led by the committee of Feis na nGleann, who organised the yearly celebration of Gaelic culture, language and heritage that was held in Cushendall by the same name. The founders of the Feis were: Miss Barbara McDonnell, Monavart, Cushendall (President); Miss Ada McNeill, Cushendun (Secretary) (a close friend and colleague of another Gaelic conservationist, Margaret Dobbs); Daniel McAllister, Mill Street, Cushendall (Assistant Secretary); Francis Joseph Bigger, 'Ard Righ', Belfast (Treasurer); and Joseph Duffy (Treasurer).

Also to feature prominently in the conservation were: Rose Maud Young (Irish Róis Ní Ógáin), a wealthy Protestant aristocrat from Galgorm Castle in Ballymena who provided invaluable linguistic research to various Irish-language editorials, such as Conradh na Gaeilge's An Claidheamh Soluis; Aoidhmhín mac Gréagóir, a linguist and folklorist who was based in Ligoniel in Belfast and who provided over 300 words to Rev. Patrick S. Dineen for the second edition of his acclaimed dictionary Foclóir Gaedhilge agus Béarla. Also heavily involved in the revival, and remembered fondly by locals, was An tAthair Domhnaill Ó Tuathail (Father O'Toole), who is remembered as 'the founder of The Phrase Method (Irish Modh na Ráidhte)'.

Alongside the celebrations of history and culture, linguistic studies were also created, the most important of which were the two books On some relics of the Irish dialect spoken in the Glens of Antrim and The Irish language in Rathlin Island by Swedish linguist Nils Holmer.

Feis na nGleann continues to this day alongside the language and learning festival Éigse na nGlinntí.
