= Lil Nic Dhonnchadha =

Irish teacher, scholar, and Irish language activist

- Born: Lilian Nic Dhonnchadha; 9 October 1891; Belfast, County Antrim, Ireland
- Died: 9 March 1984 (aged 89); Dublin

Lil Nic Dhonnchadha (9 October 1891 – 9 March 1984) was an Irish language scholar and language activist.

== Early life and education ==
Lilian Nic Dhonnchadha was born in Belfast on 9 October 1891. Her parents were Séamus Mac Donnchadha, a customs and excise officer, and Georgina Ffolliott L'Amie, a teacher. She had 3 surviving sisters. When she was a year old, the family moved to Holywood, County Down, and later moved to Coleraine, County Londonderry when she was 6. Nic Dhonnchadha's father started teaching her Irish when she was 12, but she recalled her father giving her an Irish grammar book when she was sick with the measles at age 4. She read books by Norma Borthwick, Séamus Ó Dubhghaill, and Pádraig Ó Séaghdha. In Coleraine, her father taught adults and children Irish at the local catholic national school having been given permission by the parish priest. The author Séamas Ó Dubhghaill and a travelling Irish teacher known as a timire, Tomás Bán Ó Concheanainn, regularly visited her family home.

She attended a kindergarten in Coleraine and a private Presbyterian school run by the Irwin sisters in Castlerock, County Londonderry, later moving to the girls' intermediate school in Ballymoney. The family moved to Rathgar, Dublin in 1907, where she was enrolled in Alexandra College, where she was taught by Máire Ní Chinnéide. With her father, she joined the Craobh na gCúig gCúigí branch of Conradh na Gaeilge, becoming an active promoter of Irish. In 1910, she was one of the first 10 women to enter Trinity College Dublin (TCD) as an undergraduate to study Celtic studies, French and German. She funded her education there through prizes and scholarships such as a sizarship and the Burke memorial prize. She travelled to Germany and France during her time at university, and was an active member of the Elizabethan society, debating and sitting on the committee. In 1914 she graduated with a first class honours degree.

== Career ==
Nic Dhonnchadha's first job was in Mercer's girls' secondary school, Castleknock, County Dublin, where she taught for 6 months. She then moved to Alexandra College and to Coláiste Moibhí in 1933. In 1934 she became principal of Coláiste Moibhí until 1951. After this she taught Irish in TCD for 3 years. She was a widely published Irish-language scholar. Among her first pieces appearing in Béaloideas, was "Scéal na bhfathach", in 1928. In 1932 she published her edition of a thesis on fever in Revue Celtique xlix. She wrote an edition of the story "Altram tige da medar" from Leabhar fhear muighe which she adapted as a radio drama that was broadcast twice in July 1958 on Radio Éireann. She published two fasciculi (viii, xviii) on the Royal Irish Academy's manuscript catalogues. Her essays appeared in An tUltach, as well as Irish and English articles, reviews and letters in Focus, a Protestant journal, from 1959 to 1963.

Nic Dhonnchadha was active in Cumann Gaelach na hEaglaise from 1936, an organisation for members of the Church of Ireland who worshipped in Irish. She later served as the organisation's secretary. Around this time she had begun work on a new Irish translation of the Book of common prayer for An Gúm, which was eventually published in 1965. Her Leabhar iomann, a book of 77 hymns in Irish, was published in 1961. In 1970 she edited Rev. Cosslett Quin's New testament, published by the Hibernian Bible Society. She also served on a wide number of committees including the Arts Council of Ireland and the Radio Éireann advisory council. She founded the Protestant Fellowship with Caitlín Ní Dhomhnaill, a social club for Protestant Irish speakers, in the 1950s.

Nic Dhonnchadha was also interviewed for RTÉ television programmes including An fear agus a scéal (May 1962), Trom agus éadrom, and a special edition of Féach (1979). On 20 March 1970, she was presented with Gradam seachtain na Gaeilge by Conradh na Gaeilge for her service to Ireland and the Irish language. After injuring herself from a fall in 1983, her health worsened, and she died on 9 March 1984. She is buried at Howth cemetery.
