= Árainn Mhór =

Árainn Mhór may refer to:

- Arranmore, County Donegal
- Inishmore, County Galway
