= Rose Young =

Rose Young may refer to:

- Rose Emmet Young (1869–1941), American fiction and editorial writer, and advocate for the suffrage movement
- Rose Maud Young (1866–1947), Irish writer, scholar and collector of Irish songs
