= Abadjiev =

Abadjiev or Abadzhiev, Bulgarian: Абаджиев is a masculine occupational Bulgarian surname, a producer of hodden, its feminine counterpart is Bulgarian: Абаджиева, Abadjieva or Abadzhieva. Notable people with the surname include:

- Ivan Abadzhiev (1932–2017), Bulgarian weightlifter and coach
- Vasco Abadjiev (1926–1978), Bulgarian violinist
- Lilia Abadjieva (born 1966), Bulgarian theatre director
- Borislav Abadzhiev (born 1963), Bulgarian boxer
- Ivan Abadzhiev (1932–2017), Bulgarian weightlifter
- Stefan Abadzhiev (born 1934), Bulgarian footballer
