= Dooney =

Dooney is a surname. Notable people with the surname include:

- Kevin Dooney (born 1993), Irish runner
- Michael Dooney, American comic book writer and artist and toy designer
- Roy Dooney (born 1958), Irish runner and father of Kevin
- Tom Dooney (born 1939), New Zealand sprint canoeist

== See also ==
- Dooney & Bourke, an American fashion accessory company
- The Fiddler of Dooney, an 1899 poem by William Butler Yeats
