= Bible translations into Irish =

Irish translations of the Bible

Translations of the Bible into Irish were first printed and published in the 17th century: the New Testament, the Tiomna Nuadh, in 1602, the Old Testament, the Sean Thiomna, in 1685, and the entire Bible, the Bíobla (Old and New Testaments combined) in 1690.

Scottish Gaels used Irish translations, particularly Bedell's translation until about the 1760s, when they received their own translations.

== Early retellings ==
Prior to the translation of the Bible into Irish, retelling parts of the story was more common. One example of this is the tenth-century Saltair na Rann, an account of the Creation and the lives of Adam and Eve.

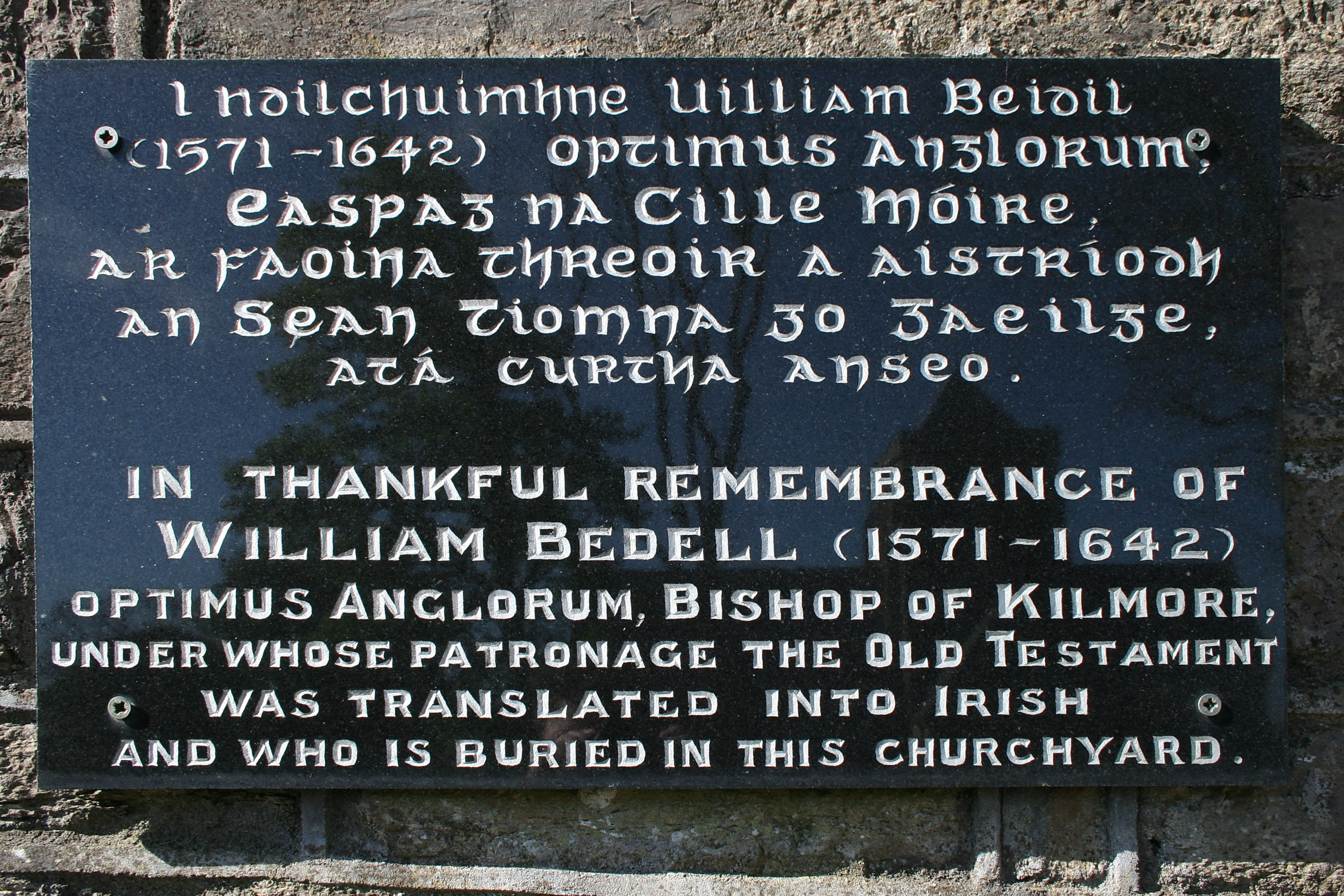
Plaque on a gate pillar of the graveyard beside Kilmore Cathedral, County Cavan

== Walsh, Daniel and Bedell's version ==
After the Tudor reconquest of Ireland, the established Church of Ireland attempted to consolidate the Reformation in Ireland, with little success among the Gaelic Irish. The first translation of the New Testament (Tiomna Nuadh) was begun by Nicholas Walsh, Bishop of Ossory, who worked on it until his untimely death in 1585. The work was continued by John Kearney (Treasurer of St. Patrick's, Dublin), his assistant, and Dr. Nehemiah Donellan, Archbishop of Tuam, and it was finally completed by William O'Domhnuill (William Daniel, Archbishop of Tuam in succession to Donellan). The Irish New Testament was printed in 1602 and was reprinted in 1681. The entire Bible (Old and New Testaments combined) was first published in 1690.

The work of translating the Old Testament was undertaken by William Bedell (1571–1642), Bishop of Kilmore, who completed his translation within the reign of Charles I. However, the Old Testament was not published in Irish until 1685, in a revised version by Narcissus Marsh (1638–1713), Archbishop of Dublin.

In 1817 the British and Foreign Bible Society published an edition of ‘An Biobla Naomhta’. It was printed in London in Roman typeface, and included the Bedell Old Testament and the O’Donnell New Testament. It is sometimes called the Bedel or Bedell version.

| Translation | John (Eoin) 3:16 |
|---|---|
| An Bíobla Naomhtha (Bedel version, from reprint in 1817) | Oír is mar so do ghrádhuigh Día an domhan, go dtug sé a éinghein Meic fein, ionnus gidh bé chreideas ann, nach rachadh sé a mugha, achd go mbeith an bheatha shiorruidhe aige. (In today's form: Óir is mar seo do ghráigh Dia an domhan, go dtug sé a aonghin Mic féin, ionas gibé chreideas ann, nach rachadh sé amú, ach go mbeadh an bheatha shíoraí aige.) |

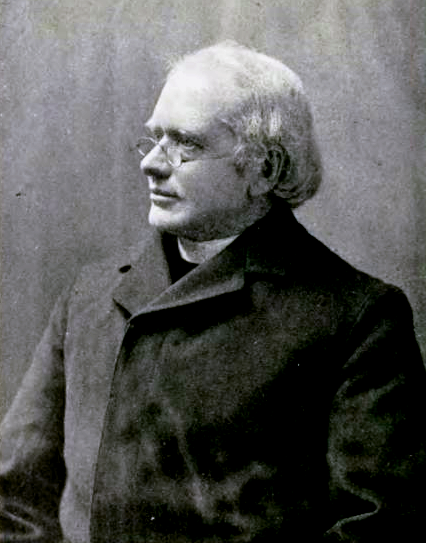
Peadar Ua Laoghaire

== Peadar Ua Laoghaire translation ==
Peadar Ua Laoghaire (Peter O’Leary) was a Catholic priest and great scholar. He was born in 1839 and died in March 1920. He spoke Munster Irish and wrote much literature in the Irish language. He translated the whole Bible and some of it was published by Brún agus Ó Nóláin. The 4 Gospels were published in 1915, Acts in 1921. He translated the New Testament from the Vulgate with reference to the Greek, and translated the Old Testament from the Septuagint. The unpublished manuscripts are at Maynooth University.

== Joynt translation ==
In 1951, the Hibernian Bible Society published a translation of the New Testament into Irish made by Earnán De Siúnta (Ernest Edwin Joynt, "An Buachaillín Buidhe") a Methodist active in the Gaelic League, and based on the 1602 translation.

== Translation by Pádraig Mac Giolla Cheara ==
An Scrioptúir Naoṁṫa - na ceiṫre soiscéil agus gníoṁarṫa na n-Abstal (The Holy Scriptures - The 4 Gospels and Acts of the Apostles) was first translated into Irish Gaelic by Pádraig Mac Giolla Cheara. It was published in 1943 by Comhaltas Uladh of Belfast and Dundalk. It got the Imprimatur from Cardinal Joseph MacRory, Archbishop of Armagh, Primate of All Ireland. He later produced a second edition of the Acts of the Apostles rendered into the revised modern Irish grammar and spelling in 1961.

== Ó Cuinn New Testament 1970 ==
In 1970 the New Testament (Tiomna Nua) was translated by Church of Ireland minister Cosslett Ó Cuinn (1907-1995), after he took up the post of professor of Biblical Greek at Trinity College, Dublin in 1961. It is based on the Revised Standard Version (RSV) in English and the original Greek. It has a distinct Ulster dialect. It was published in 1970 by Cumann Gaelach na hEaglaise (Irish Guild of the Church of Ireland) with the assistance of the Hibernian Bible Society (now called the National Bible Society of Ireland). He also translated the Book of Psalms which is in the Church of Ireland Book of Common Prayer, published in 1965.

== Maynooth Bible 1981 ==
The Irish Roman Catholic bishops established a commission in 1945 to plan the publication of an Irish-language New Testament, and a steering committee in 1966 to publish a complete Bible. Books were published individually in various forms by An Sagart, a Catholic publisher established at Saint Patrick's College, Maynooth by Pádraig Ó Fiannachta, from the Gospel of Luke in 1964 until 1977. Ó Fiannachta and Coslett Ó Cuinn were among the translators. A complete version, revised from the originals and edited by Ó Fiannachta, was published as An Bíobla Naofa in 1981. This is now available online. In 2014 an edition of the New Testament and Psalms was published with revised proper names.

| Translation | John (Eoin) 3:16 |
|---|---|
| An Bíobla Naofa (The Holy Bible, 1981 Catholic translation) | Óir ghráigh Dia an domhan chomh mór sin gur thug sé a Aonghin Mic uaidh i dtreo, gach duine a chreideann ann, nach gcaillfí é ach go mbeadh an bheatha shíoraí aige. |
