= Mici (disambiguation) =

Mici, also known as Mititei, is a Romanian food.

Mici may also refer to:

== People ==
- Gledi Mici (born 1991), football player
- Mici Erdélyi (1910–1994), Hungarian actress
- Mici Haraszti (1882–1964)
- Micí Mac Gabhann (1865–1948)

== Places ==
Many Romanian toponyms have include the word Mici..
