= Róise Mhic Ghrianna =

Irish-language singer and storyteller

- Born: 13 March 1879; Sheskinarone, County Donegal
- Died: 6 April 1964 (aged 85); Arranmore

Róise Mhic Ghrianna, known primarily as Róise Rua (13 March 1879 – 6 April 1964) was a traditional Irish-language singer and storyteller.

== Early life and family ==
Róise Mhic Ghrianna was born Róise Ní Cholla in Sheskinarone, near Dungloe, County Donegal on 13 March 1879. She was one of five children of Tomas Ó Colla, farmer, and his wife, Maighréad. Maighréad's father was Seán Hiúdaí Mac an Bhaird, who was a noted musician. Mhic Ghrianna's father died when she was four years old. Her mother married Antain Ó Gallchóir two years later, and the family moved to his home on Arranmore. Antain Ó Gallchóir was a butcher and also known as the last great storyteller on the island. The island was Irish-speaking, but her schooling was through English at Leabgarrow school. From age 9, Mhic Ghrianna spent every spring on Inishkeeragh, harvesting kelp and doing housework. After she left school, she worked in The Laggan, in Glenmornan, County Tyrone and later on the banks of Lough Swilly for three years all together. Following this she travelled between Ireland and Scotland picking potatoes.

Mhic Ghrianna married Séamas Mac Grianna, a local from Arranmore she had known since childhood, when she was 29. From his father, the couple received half of his farm, around three acres on which they built a small cottage. Mhic Ghrianna lived in this house until her death. Her husband worked in Scotland annually from May to December. During this time Mhic Ghrianna kept a small farm, with a donkey and a cow. From 1934, her husband collected the dole, making creels and baskets for extra income.

== Singing and storytelling ==
Mhic Ghrianna was visited by Rev. Cosslett Ó Cuinn in 1940, when he transcribed some of her stories and songs. This recognition gave her some confidence as a traditional singer and seanchaí as up to this point her only audience was her husband. Padraig Ua Cnáimhsí, the principal of the school in Arranmore, visited her in 1951 when he transcribed 70 of her songs. He told the Irish Folklore Commission and Radio Éireann about Mhic Ghrianna, who sent Seán Ó hEochaidh and Proinsias Ó Conluain respectively. Ó Conluain's recordings of her from 1953 were broadcast on Radio Éireann in a programme about Mhic Ghrianna's life. She was also visited by Séamus Ennis when he was working for the BBC folklore commission in the 1950s.

== Legacy ==
Mhic Ghrianna died 6 April 1964. The Ó Conluain recordings from 1953 were later edited by Cathal Goan. The resulting work was released as an album by RTÉ with an accompanying booklet called Róise na nAmhrán: songs of a Donegal woman. Ua Cnáimhsí wrote her life story, Róise Rua, which was published in 1983, in Irish. The book won a prize at the 1983 Oireachtas na Gaeilge in Dublin. A translation of the book to English by JJ Keaveny, titled "Roise Rua: An Island Memoir" was published in 2009.

An annual music, singing and dance festival in her honour, Féile Róise Rua, has been held on Arranmore since 2019, and has been featured on RTÉ's Other Voices

In 2025, Mhic Ghrianna was inducted into the RTÉ Radio 1 Folk Awards Hall of Fame.
