= Bible translations into Gaelic =

Bible translations into Gaelic may refer to:

- Bible translations into Irish
- Bible translations into Scottish Gaelic
