= Emma Langford =

Irish singer (born 1989)

- Born: 3 November 1989 (age 36); Limerick, Ireland
- Occupation: Musician
- Known for: Folk music

Emma Langford is an Irish folk singer-songwriter from Caherdavin, a northern suburb of Limerick City.

She released her debut album, Quiet Giant, in 2017 – for which she received the Best Emerging Artist award at the inaugural RTÉ Radio 1 Folk Awards. In 2019 she embarked on an international tour, making her US debut at the Milwaukee Irish Fests.

In 2019, she became the first ever recipient of the Dolores O'Riordan Bursary – an award created in memory of the singer from Limerick to promote creative arts projects in the city.

Langford released her second album, Sowing Acorns, in 2020. All of the proceeds from the first single from this album, ‘Mariana’ were donated to Safe Ireland, a charity focused on protecting women and children from domestic violence. Langford collaborated with Belfast poet and actor Vanessa Ifediora on her single Sowing Acorns.

She has been nominated for Best Folk Singer at the RTÉ Radio 1 Folk Awards 2020.

Langford also curates the Limerick Lady Festival, an initiative which aims to promote female musicians to tackle the issue of gender imbalance in the music industry. The Festival has also inspired a podcast called The Limerick Lady Podcast, which Langford presents alongside Ann Blake, where they discuss issues around gender, art and representation.

She holds a BA in voice and dance from the University of Limerick, and has also completed an MA at the same institution.

In October 2021, it was announced that Langford has been included on the longlist for the 64th Annual Grammy Awards in two categories; Album of the Year and Song of the Year.

Langford was diagnosed with autism at the age of 32.

== Awards and nominations ==
=== RTÉ Radio 1 Folk Awards ===
Year	Nominee / work	Award	Result
2017	Emma Langford	Best Emerging Artist	Won
2020	Emma Langford	Best Folk Singer	Nominated

=== Grammy Awards ===
Year	Nominee / work	Award	Result
2021	Emma Langford, Sowing Acorns	Album of the Year	Longlisted
2020	Emma Langford, Birdsong	Song of the Year	Longlisted
