= Inishcoo =

Island in County Donegal, Ireland

Native name: Inis Cú
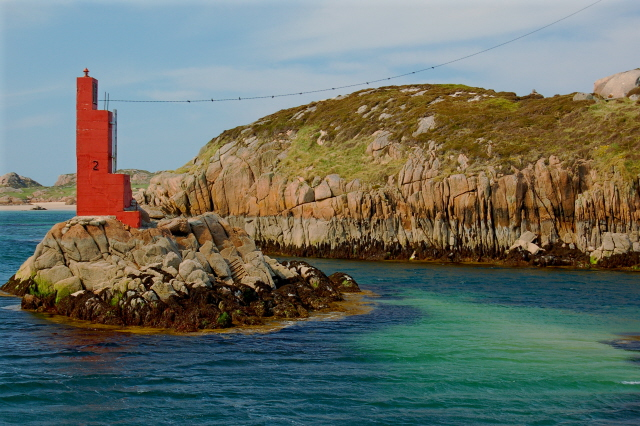
- View of the NW end of Inishcoo

- Location within island of Ireland

Geography
- Location: Atlantic Ocean
- Coordinates: 54°59′13″N 8°27′50″W
- Area: 0.50 km^{2} (0.19 sq mi)

Administration
- Ireland
- Province: Ulster
- County: Donegal

Inishcoo (Irish: Inis Cú) is a small island and a townland off the coast of County Donegal, Ireland. The closest town on the mainland is Burtonport.

== Geography ==
The island is located around 1.5 km East of Arranmore and South-West of the small island of Eighter. A footbridge connects the two islets, both known for pleasant sandbeaches. The inner part of Inishcoo is mainly rocky (granite) and bears a small lake.

== History ==
A small community used to live on Inishcoo in the first part of the 20th century. Some of the old houses are used as holiday homes; the biggest is a former coast-guard building in the south-western part of the island.

Historical population

Year	Pop.	±%
1841	37	—
1851	18	−51.4%
1861	47	+161.1%
1871	44	−6.4%
1881	11	−75.0%
1891	5	−54.5%
1901	6	+20.0%
1911	9	+50.0%

Year	Pop.	±%
1926	12	+33.3%
1936	7	−41.7%
1946	6	−14.3%
1951	4	−33.3%
1956	2	−50.0%
1961	3	+50.0%
1966	0	−100.0%
1971	0	0.00%

Year	Pop.	±%
1979	0	0.00%
1981	0	0.00%
1986	0	0.00%
1991	0	0.00%
1996	0	0.00%
2002	0	0.00%
2006	0	0.00%

Source: Central Statistics Office. "CNA17: Population by Off Shore Island, Sex and Year". CSO.ie.

== Photo gallery ==
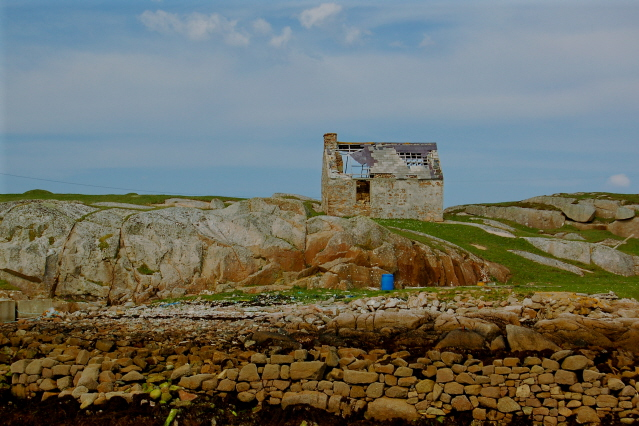
A derelict building on Inishcoo

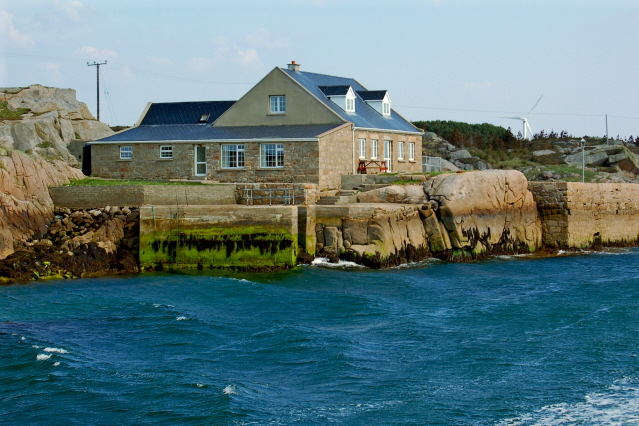
Another house as seen from the Arranmore ferry

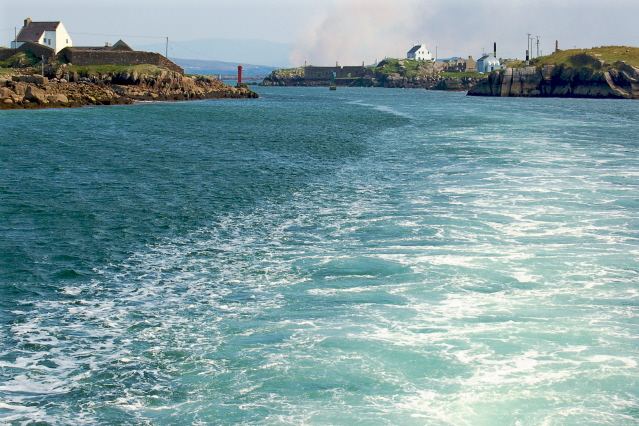
The channel dividing Rutland from Inishcoo (on the left)

== See also ==
Media related to Inishcoo at Wikimedia Commons

- List of islands of Ireland
