= Eighter Island =

Island in County Donegal, Ireland

Native name: An tÍochtar
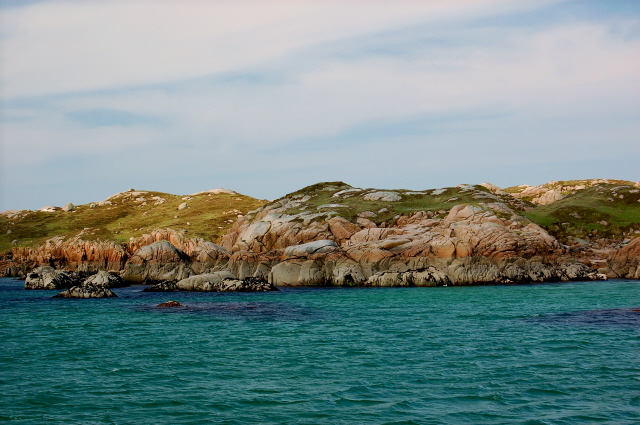
- View of the NW end of Eighter Island

- Location within island of Ireland

Geography
- Location: Atlantic Ocean
- Coordinates: 54°59′30″N 8°28′27″W
- Area: 0.24 km^{2} (0.093 sq mi)

Administration
- Ireland
- Province: Ulster
- County: Donegal

Demographics
- Population: 0 (2011)

Eighter Island (Irish: An tÍochtar) is a small island and a townland off the coast of County Donegal, Ireland. The closest town on the mainland is Burtonport.

== Geography ==
The island is located around one km east of Arranmore and North-West of Inishcoo, another small island divided by narrow channels from Rutland and the mainland. A footbridge connects the two islets, both known for pleasant sandbeaches. The inner part of Eighter Island is mainly rocky and the most convenient landing sites are in the southern part of it.

== History ==
A small community used to live on Eighter Island in the first part of the 20th century, but today the island is uninhabited. Some of the old houses are used as holiday homes, mostly concentrated in the south-eastern part of the island.

In 28 July 1989, 6 University of Edinburgh students travelling back to the island in a dinghy were involved in a boating accident, from which only 2 survived.

Historical population

Year	Pop.	±%
1841	59	—
1851	57	−3.4%
1861	39	−31.6%
1871	29	−25.6%
1881	34	+17.2%
1891	35	+2.9%
1901	43	+22.9%
1911	40	−7.0%

Year	Pop.	±%
1926	24	−40.0%
1936	17	−29.2%
1946	15	−11.8%
1951	14	−6.7%
1956	17	+21.4%
1961	5	−70.6%
1966	0	−100.0%
1971	0	0.00%

Year	Pop.	±%
1979	0	0.00%
1981	0	0.00%
1986	0	0.00%
1991	0	0.00%
1996	0	0.00%
2002	0	0.00%
2006	0	0.00%

Source: Central Statistics Office. "CNA17: Population by Off Shore Island, Sex and Year". CSO.ie.

== See also ==
- List of islands of Ireland
