= Cosslett Ó Cuinn =

Irish priest and translator

The Rev. Canon Cosslett Quin, in Irish Cosslett Ó Cuinn (Derriaghy, County Antrim, 27 February 1907 – 6 December 1995) was a priest of the Church of Ireland who translated the New Testament into Irish.

Quin was born to Charles Edward Quin, rector of Derriaghy, and Edith Isobel Waddell. He studied at Campbell College, Belfast, and later at Trinity College Dublin, where he received his Bachelor of Divinity in Theology in 1940.

Quin was a poet, theologian, critic, biblical scholar, member of the ecumenical movement, and a scholar of the Irish language. During his studies, he developed a strong interest in Ulster Irish, and often visited the Irish-speaking Gola Island and Derrybeg. He also published articles in Éigse: A Journal of Irish Studies on the dialects of Irish spoken on Rathlin Island and in County Kilkenny. Quin compiled the folklore of native Irish speakers from the islands of Tory and Arranmore off the coast of County Donegal, including Róise Mhic Ghrianna. Quin spoke 12 languages.

While working in Belfast and Inishowen in 1931, Quin was promoted to the post of deacon. In 1961, he was appointed professor of Biblical Greek at Trinity College, and began work on a new translation of the New Testament. He also translated the Book of Psalms, the Prayer Book of the Church of Ireland and the Apocrypha into Irish, as well as theological works by Walter Eichrodt and Rome and Canterbury: A Biblical and Free Catholicism by Emmanuel Amand de Mendieta.

Although it was unusual in his lifetime for Protestants to hold leading positions in the Irish language movement, Quin was for a time President of Oireachtas na Gaeilge. He was made a canon of St Patrick's Cathedral in 1966, before retiring from the ministry in 1971.

== Publications (selected) ==
- 1951 The Ten Commandments: a theological exposition. London: Lutterworth
- 1954 At the Lord's Table: a theological and devotional commentary on the Holy Communion Service according to the Anglican Rite of 1662. London: Lutterworth
- 1970: Tiomna Nua: ár dTiarna agus ár Slánaitheora Íosa Chríost;an Canónach Oirmh. Cosslett Ó Cuinn, a d'aistrigh ón Revised Standard Version agus ón nGréigis. Baile Átha Cliath: Cumann Gaelach na hEaglaise
- 1984: Leabhar urnaí malairt leagain 1984: orthaí le haghaidh Domhnaí, príomhlaethanta naofa agus séasúr; de réir nósanna Eaglais na hÉireann Baile Átha Cliath: Cumann Gaelach na hEaglaise (selections from the Alternative Prayer Book)
