= Liffey Light Orchestra =

Irish musical group

- Origin: Dublin, County Dublin, Ireland
- Genres: Prog rock; Celtic fusion
- Years active: 1974–present
- Labels: Legal Records
- Members: Paul Egan; Anthony Drennan; Mick O'Brien; Robbie Harris; David Agnew; Philip Begley; John McCullough
- Past members: Brian Dunning; Tommy Keyes
- Website: liffeylight.com

The Liffey Light Orchestra is a musical group based in Dublin, Ireland, known originally for its performances of the music of English composer and multi-instrumentalist Mike Oldfield, including the first live performance of his Ommadawn in 1977. From 1976 into the 1980s it regularly performed Oldfield’s Tubular Bells and other pieces. The Liffey Light Orchestra is now primarily a recording group, performing music composed by its founder Paul Egan, which blends progressive rock and folk influences along with Irish traditional music. A 2020 review in Hot Press compared Egan's music to that of fellow Irish composers Bill Whelan and Shaun Davey.

== History ==
The Liffey Light Orchestra was founded in Dublin, Ireland, in 1974 as a pit band for shows at Dublin University Players, the drama society at Trinity College Dublin (TCD). In 1976, it expanded to perform Tubular Bells for the first time outside the United Kingdom in a week-long sell-out run of concerts at TCD. In 1977, it expanded its repertoire to include Ommadawn, which it performed for the first time on 1 May 1977. It subsequently added the music of Jean-Michel Jarre, performing his Oxygène as part of the 1978 Dublin Theatre Festival. It continued playing live into the 1980s.

The band resumed playing in the 2000s as a studio group, releasing a series of albums: Filaments (2011), Le French Album (2017), Lekeila (2020), and Jigs and Other Stories (2025).

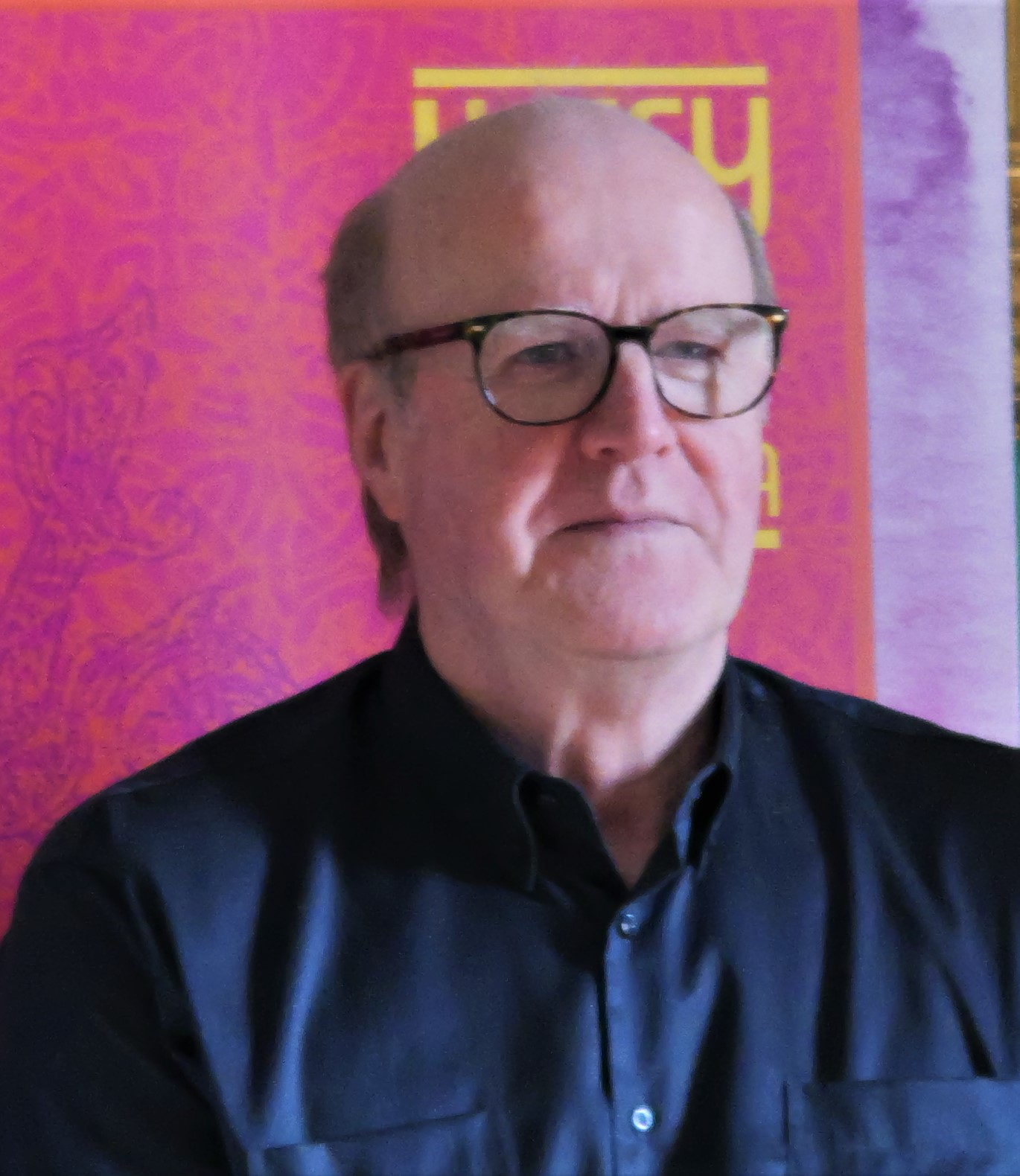
Paul Egan at the launch of Jigs and Other Stories

== Members ==
The Liffey Light Orchestra has featured a number of musicians who have played a role in shaping the group's sound. These include:

- Anto Drennan, guitar, a founding member of the group and performer on all the group's albums
- Mick O'Brien, uilleann pipes and whistles
- Robbie Harris, bodhrán and other percussion
- Brian Dunning, flute, piccolo, and
- David Agnew, oboe and recorder.

== Musical style and influence ==
The Liffey Light Orchestra's musical style is heavily influenced by Mike Oldfield's works, including his early album Tubular Bells and Ommadawn.

== Discography ==
Filaments

- Released: 2011
- Format: CD
- Label: Legal Records
- Writer: Paul Egan
- Producer: Paul Egan
- Tracks: Sixteen
- Bonus tracks: Two
- Singles: O Together, released 2011

Le French Album

- Released: 2017
- Format: CD
- Label: Legal Records
- Writer: Paul Egan
- Producer: Paul Egan

Lekeila

- Released: 2020
- Format: CD
- Label: Legal Records
- Writer: Paul Egan
- Producer: Paul Egan

Jigs and Other Stories

- Released: 2025
- Format: CD
- Label: Legal Records
- Writer: Paul Egan
- Producer: Paul Egan
