= RTÉ Radio 1 Folk Awards =

Irish folk music awards

- Awarded for: Best in Irish folk music
- Country: Ireland
- Presented by: RTÉ Radio 1
- First award: 2018; 8 years ago
- Website: rte.ie/folkawards

Television/radio coverage
- Network: RTÉ

The RTÉ Radio 1 Folk Awards are annual awards presented by RTÉ Radio 1 to celebrate the best in Irish folk music. The awards were established in 2018 and include recipients such as Martin Hayes, Emma Langford, Declan O'Rourke, Moya Brennan, Andy Irvine, Saint Sister, Steve Cooney, Lisa O'Neill and Lankum.

== History ==
On 1 May 2018 at a launch in Vicar Street, Dublin, RTÉ Radio 1 announced that it would host the inaugural RTÉ Radio 1 Folk Awards at Vicar Street on 25 October of that year, with the event being broadcast live on RTÉ Radio 1 on the night. The RTÉ Radio 1 Folk Awards were to be the first dedicated folk awards held in Ireland, with nine awards categories showcasing and honouring the richness and diversity of folk music talent in Ireland. This would be held in addition to TG4's annual Gradam Ceoil awards, the premier award event in traditional Irish music.

RTÉ Radio 1 later put out a call for designers and craftspeople to design and produce the trophies for the winners at the inaugural RTÉ Radio 1 Folk Awards. The competition invited candidates to create a series of nine commissions, one for each of the awards categories. The purpose of this competition was to promote and highlight the talent and skills of the craft and design sector and to build a collection of unique awards that reflect the diversity of Ireland's rich talent and heritage through folk music, craft and design. Three candidates were shortlisted based on their work and a statement describing how they would incorporate the heritage of Irish folk music into their design. The winner of the commission, artist Fiona Mulholland was invited to discuss the work as part of RTÉ Radio 1's Arena programme. The award is in the shape of a guitar pick. According to Mulholland, the guitar pick is an universal symbol for guitar playing, and reminiscent of flower petals, in line with the Harvest theme. The awards are 35 centimetres tall and 14 centimetres wide.

The inaugural awards ceremony was hosted in front of a live audience at a packed-out Vicar Street. The visual theme for the awards ceremony was Harvest, inspired by folk heritage, nostalgia and an autumnal palette. The ceremony included performances by artists such as Andy Irvine, Lankum and Saint Sister. In addition to the Vicar Street event, RTÉ Radio 1 produced a five-part feature series on folk music with the support of the Broadcasting Authority of Ireland, which were broadcast in the run up to the awards night.

The Folk Awards has been hosted every year by RTÉ presenter John Creedon with co-presenter Ruth Smith for the first four awards ceremonies, and is broadcast live on RTÉ Radio 1 or can be streamed on the RTÉ Radio Player. While the awards ceremony is not broadcast live on television, the entire show is filmed and the highlights can be streamed on YouTube or RTÉ Player. In 2019, highlights from the awards ceremony were televised for the first time, broadcast at a later date on RTÉ One.

In 2020, the prizes were announced at a special live event from RTÉ Radio studios, Dublin due to the COVID-19 pandemic and included a special video message from President of Ireland, Michael D. Higgins.

In November 2021 The Folk Awards returned to being held in front of a live audience in Vicar Street, Dublin. In 2023 The Folk Awards moved from being held in November a date in February. In 2026 it returned to the November date. There was no award ceremony in 2024.

== Selection ==
The nominees shortlist is announced annually in September and is selected by a judging panel of 40 people, among them musicians, promoters, broadcasters, journalists, bloggers and venue owners. The Best Folk Album award was previously chosen by RTÉ Radio 1 listeners through The John Creedon Show and Simply Folk with Ruth Smith.

== Hall of Fame ==
A posthumous 'Hall of Fame' award is presented annually to celebrate past legends of the Irish folk world.

=== Inductees ===
- 2026 inductee: Dolores Keane
- 2025 inductee: Róise Rua
- 2023 inductee: Séamus Ennis
- 2022 inductee: Paddy Moloney
- 2021 inductee: Sarah Makem
- 2020 inductee: Frank Harte
- 2019 inductee: Margaret Barry
- 2018 inductee: Tom Munnelly and John Reilly

== Lifetime Achievement Award ==
The Lifetime Achievement Award is made annually by the Executive Steering Committee of the RTÉ Radio 1 Folk Awards to a living artist who has made a significant contribution to Irish folk music over many years.

=== Inductees ===
- 2026 inductee: Tommy Sands
- 2025 inductee: Dónal Lunny
- 2023 inductee: Tríona Ní Dhomhnaill
- 2022 inductee: Mary Black
- 2021 inductee: Christy Moore
- 2020 inductee: Steve Cooney
- 2019 inductee: Moya Brennan
- 2018 inductee: Andy Irvine

== Award winners ==
=== 2026 ===
- Best Folk Singer: Barry Kerr
- Best Folk Instrumentalist: Ultan O'Brien
- Best Folk Group: Beoga
- Best Emerging Artist: Rua Rí
- Best Folk Album: It's Not Going To Be Okay - Joshua Burnside
- Best Original Folk Track: "The Curlew's Cry" – Barry Kerr
- Best Traditional Folk Track: "De May Bush" – Macdara Yeates
- Lifetime Achievement Award: Tommy Sands
- Hall of Fame: Dolores Keane

Host: John Creedon Venue: Vicar Street, Dublin

=== 2025 ===
- Best Folk Singer: Ríoghnach Connolly
- Best Folk Instrumentalist: Alannah Thornburgh
- Best Folk Group: Landless
- Best Emerging Artist: Róis
- Best Folk Album: Fíoruisce - The Legend of the Lough – John Spillane
- Best Original Folk Track: "Caoine" – Róis
- Best Traditional Folk Track: "Welcome Home, Gráinne" – Natalie Ní Chasaide & Iarfhlaith Ó Domhnaill
- Lifetime Achievement Award: Dónal Lunny
- Hall of Fame: Róise Rua

Host: John Creedon Venue: Vicar Street, Dublin

=== 2023 ===
- Best Folk Singer: Eoghan Ó Ceannabháin
- Best Folk Instrumentalist: Aoife Ní Bhriain
- Best Folk Group: Lankum
- Best Emerging Artist: Séamus and Caoimhe Uí Fhlatharta
- Best Folk Album: False Lankum – Lankum
- Best Original Folk Track: "Anáil na hOíche" – Eoghan Ó Ceannabháin
- Best Traditional Folk Track: "Seán Gabha" – Piaras Ó Lorcáin and Bláth na hÓige
- Lifetime Achievement Award: Tríona Ní Dhomhnaill
- Hall of Fame: Séamus Ennis

Host: John Creedon Venue: Vicar Street, Dublin

=== 2022 ===
- Best Folk Singer: Muireann Nic Amhlaoibh
- Best Folk Instrumentalist: Cormac Begley
- Best Folk Group: the olllam
- Best Emerging Artist: Cathal Ó Curráin
- Best Folk Album: Nine Waves - Ye Vagabonds
- Best Original Folk Track: "Róisín Dubh" - Muireann Nic Amhlaoibh & the Irish Chamber Orchestra
- Best Traditional Folk Track: "I'm a Rover" – Ye Vagabonds
- Lifetime Achievement Award: Mary Black
- Hall of Fame: Paddy Moloney

Host: John Creedon Venue: Vicar Street, Dublin

=== 2021 ===
- Best Folk Singer: John Francis Flynn
- Best Folk Instrumentalist: Caoimhín Ó Fearghail
- Best Folk Group: Ye Vagabonds
- Best Emerging Artist: John Francis Flynn
- Best Folk Album: Solas an Lae – Eoghan Ó Ceannabháin and Ultan O'Brien
- Best Original Folk Track: "Chain Reaction" – Mick Flannery & Susan O'Neill
- Best Traditional Folk Track: "I'm a Rover" – Ye Vagabonds
- Lifetime Achievement Award: Christy Moore
- Hall of Fame: Sarah Makem

Hosts: John Creedon and Ruth Smith
Venue: Vicar Street, Dublin

=== 2020 ===
- Best Folk Singer: Radie Peat
- Best Folk Instrumentalist: Steve Cooney
- Best Folk Group: Lankum
- Best Emerging Folk Act: Not awarded
- Best Folk Album: Ceol Ársa Cláirsí: Tunes of the Irish Harpers for Solo Guitar – Steve Cooney
- Best Original Folk Track: "Baby Talk" – Mick Flannery & SON
- Best Traditional Folk Track: "Eleanor Plunkett" – Steve Cooney
- Lifetime Achievement Award: Steve Cooney
- Hall of Fame: Frank Harte

Hosts: John Creedon and Ruth Smith
Venue: RTÉ Radio studios, Dublin

=== 2019 ===
- Best Folk Singer: Iarla Ó Lionáird
- Best Folk Instrumentalist: Zoë Conway
- Best Folk Group: Ye Vagabonds
- Best Emerging Folk Act: Saint Sister
- Best Folk Album: The Hare’s Lament – Ye Vagabonds
- Best Original Folk Track: "Rock the Machine" – Lisa O'Neill
- Best Traditional Folk Track: "The Foggy Dew" – Ye Vagabonds
- Lifetime Achievement Award: Moya Brennan
- Hall of Fame: Margaret Barry

Hosts: John Creedon and Ruth Smith
Venue: Vicar Street, Dublin

=== 2018 ===
- Best Folk Singer: Radie Peat
- Best Folk Instrumentalist: Martin Hayes
- Best Folk Group: Lankum
- Best Emerging Folk Act: Emma Langford
- Best Folk Album: Haven – We Banjo 3
- Best Original Folk Track: "Along the Western Seaboard" – Declan O'Rourke
- Best Traditional Folk Track: "Bean Dubh A’ Ghleanna" – Muireann Nic Amhlaoibh
- Lifetime Achievement Award: Andy Irvine
- Hall of Fame: Tom Munnelly and John Reilly

Hosts: John Creedon and Ruth Smith
Venue: Vicar Street, Dublin

== See also ==
- Gradam Ceoil TG4
- BBC Radio 2 Folk Awards
- Scots Trad Music Awards
