= Mick O'Brien (musician) =

Irish musician (born 1961)

- Born: 26 March 1961 (age 65); Ireland
- Origin: Dublin
- Instruments: Uilleann pipes, flute, tin whistle
- Member of: Liffey Light Orchestra

Mick O'Brien (born March 26, 1961) is an Irish musician.

== Life ==
Born in Dublin, Ireland, Mick began his musical education on the uilleann pipes in the renowned Thomas Street Pipers Club in Dublin. His father Dinny O'Brien, a traditional "box" player, was also a constant source of tunes and inspiration. He also played for a time with Riverdance.

Mick recorded his first LP with his family when he was 13 years old. He later joined Na Píobairí Uilleann, an organisation founded to promote piping, where he absorbed hundreds of tunes and refined his technique. His playing can be heard on numerous recordings with artists such as The Dubliners, Frankie Gavin and the RTÉ Concert Orchestra.

Mick has toured extensively and given master classes throughout Europe and North America. His highly acclaimed solo CD of traditional Irish music; "May Morning Dew" was released in 1996.

In 2003, Mick released Kitty Lie Over along with fiddler Caoimhín Ó Raghallaigh. It was named No.1 Traditional Album of 2003 and one of the best of the entire decade by Earle Hitchner in the Irish Echo.

2011 saw the release of Mick's second album with Caoimhín Ó Raghallaigh. The new album is named Deadly Buzz Aoibhinn Crónán.

Mick is former a teacher in St Davids C.B.S in Artane Dublin, where he taught Geography and Irish, among other subjects. Mick also looked after the hurlers of the school.

Mick has worked with several Irish composers including Michael Holohan, Linda Buckley and Dave Flynn.

He premiered the first ever set of Études for Uilleann Pipes in 2011 at the Masters of Tradition Festival in Bantry. They were composed for him by Dave Flynn.

Mick also teaches on the first two year uillean pipes making course in Ireland.

In 2023, he was awarded was named Musician of the Year at the Gradam Ceoil TG4 Awards, considered to be the foremost recognition given to traditional Irish musicians.

== Pipes and whistles ==
Mick's concert pitch uilleann pipes were built by William Rowsome in 1921, with a new chanter and extra A/G drone made by Alain Froment, who also made Mick's Bb, B, and C sets. His whistles were made by Mike Burke in the USA.

== Discography ==
=== Solo ===
- 1996: May Morning Dew
- 1999: The Ancient Voice Of Ireland - Haunting Irish Melodies In The Tradition Of Titanic

=== WIth Donncha Ó Briain ===
- 1979: Ceol ar an bhFeadóg Stáin. Irish Traditional Music On Tin Whistle (re-released 2011)

=== With Caoimhín Ó Raghallaigh ===
- 2003: Kitty Lie Over
- 2011: Deadly Buzz

=== With Emer Mayock and Aoife Ní Bhriain ===
- 2013: Tunes From The Goodman Manuscripts
- 2021: More Tunes From The Goodman Manuscripts

=== With RTÉ Contempo Quartet, Boyne Chamber Orchestra, Michael Holohan ===
2018: The Road to Lough Swilly

=== WIth Dave Flynn, Breanndán Begley, ConTempo Quartet, IMO Quartet ===
2021: Irish Minimalism

=== With the Liffey Light Orchestra ===
- 2011: Filaments
- 2020: Lekeila
- 2025: Jigs and Other Stories

=== With John Sheahan ===
- 2020 Flirting Fiddles (1 track)

=== Compilations ===
Unknown: Hal Roach & Friends (plays on 1 track)
