= Ballintra, Arranmore =

Townland in County Donegal, Ireland

Coordinates: 54.997°N 8.517°W

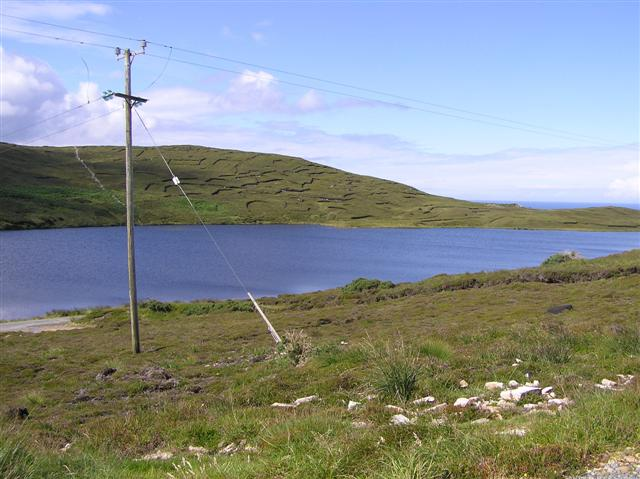
Loch an Chamhánaigh (Lough Shore) in Ballintra townland

Baile an tSratha (anglicised as Ballintra) is a townland on the Gaeltacht island of Arranmore in County Donegal, Ireland. Translated to the English language, Ballintra means "road to the beach". The townland is in the historic barony of Boylagh.
