= Róis =

Irish singer-songwriter from County Fermanagh

- Born: Rose Connolly; 1999/2000; County Fermanagh, Northern Ireland
- Genres: Keening; folk; sean-nós; avant-garde jazz; electronica
- Occupations: Singer-songwriter, composer
- Years active: 2019–present
- Label: Domino
- Website: roismusic.ie

Rose Connolly (born 1999/2000), known mononymously as Róis ([ɾˠoːʃ] ROE-sh, lit. 'rose', often capitalised RÓIS) is a composer, singer and multi-instrumentalist from County Fermanagh, Northern Ireland. She is known for singing in a keening (Irish: caoineadh) style, a traditional Irish lament.

== Early life ==
Róis was raised in Newtownbutler, a village in the south-east of County Fermanagh. She grew up around Irish traditional music in her family; her grandfather played the bagpipes and her father played the accordion. Her older brothers introduced her to electronic and alternative music as a child, including Daft Punk and Nirvana. She later studied music at the Royal Irish Academy of Music and the Royal Conservatory of The Hague.

== Career ==
Róis' first album was Uisce agus Bean (lit. 'Water and woman'), released in 2023. She cites Meredith Monk, Marina Herlop, Daniela Lalita and Hatis Noit as inspirations.

Her second album Mo Léan (lit. 'My sorrow') was released in 2024 and was nominated for the Choice Music Prize. The Guardian gave it four stars out of five, saying that "Connolly fills [keening] with new, startling life, mixing the ancient with synthesis, distortion and drones." In September 2026 she signed to Domino Recording Company.

== Personal life ==
Róis did not grow up speaking Irish, and began learning the language while studying at the Hague Conservatory. Upon returning to Ireland, she intensified her study of Irish, and uses it in her daily life. In 2024 she stated "someday I would like to live my life completely through Irish, especially when creating art."

Róis is based in Dublin.

== Discography ==
=== EPs ===
- Uisce agus Bean (2023)
- Mo Léan (2024)

=== Singles ===
- "Caoine" (2024)
- "Feel Love" (2024)
- "Did ye ever get The Ride at The Wake House?" (with hhH) (2025)
- "Port na h-Eala" (2026)

== Awards and nominations ==
Award	Year	Recipient(s)	Category	Result	Ref.
Choice Music Prize	2024	Mo Léan	Irish Album of the Year	Shortlist	
RTÉ Radio 1 Folk Awards	2025	"Caoine"	Best Original Folk Track	Won	
RTÉ Radio 1 Folk Awards	2025	Róis	Best Emerging Artist	Won	
Northern Ireland Music Prize	2025	Mo Léan	Album of the Year	Won	
Northern Ireland Music Prize	2025	Róis	Live Act of the Year	Won	
Northern Ireland Music Prize	2025	"Caoine"	Single of the Year	Shortlist	
Northern Ireland Music Prize	2026	Róis	Live Act of the Year	Pending	
