= Rose Maud Young =

Irish poet

- Duanaire Gaedhilge Róis Ní Ógáin
- Born: 30 October 1866; Ballymena, County Antrim, Ireland
- Died: 28 May 1947 (aged 80); Cushendun, County Antrim, Northern Ireland
- Other names: Rose Mabel Young; Róis Ní Ógáin
- Occupation: writer

Rose Maud Young (30 October 1865 – 28 May 1947) was an Irish writer, scholar and collector of Irish songs, best known for her work to preserve the Irish Language.

== Life and career ==
Young was born in Galgorm Castle, Ballymena, County Antrim, daughter and seventh of twelve children born to Grace Charlotte Savage, and John Young who was a prosperous unionist and high sheriff. Despite his position he was a believer in tenant rights. Her younger sister was the writer Ella Young and her brother Willie Young was secretary of the Ulster Unionist League. Young was educated by governesses until 1884 before completing training as a teacher through Cambridge University. Young also attended Gaelic League classes in 1903 in London while visiting her sister who was living in the city at the time. After visiting the Bodleian Library she became committed to the study of the Irish Language.

In the early 1900s, Young returned to Ireland and continued her study of the Irish language in Belfast at Seán Ó Catháin's Irish college and in County Donegal at Coláiste Uladh in Gort an Choirce. Young also stayed in Dublin and became friends with members of the Gaelic League and met Margaret Dobbs. Young worked with Dobbs on the Feis na nGleann (The Glens Festival), a gathering dedicated to the Irish language. Young was not involved in nationalism though she was strongly supportive of creating and maintaining a sense of "Irishness" through language and culture. She was also a friend and patron of Roger Casement. She also worked with Ellen O'Brien and contributed to O'Brien's book The Gaelic Church. Young kept meticulous diaries. Young became interested in Rathlin Island and the Gaelic spoken there.

She was friends with and lived with Margaret Dobbs. Rose Young is buried in the Presbyterian churchyard at Ahoghill, County Antrim.

== Bibliography ==
- Duanaire Gaedhilge (1921)
- Duanaire Gaedhilge a Do (1927)
- Duanaire Gaedhilge a Trí (1933)
