= Arranmore =

Island in County Donegal, Ireland

Árainn Mhór Arranmore
- Island
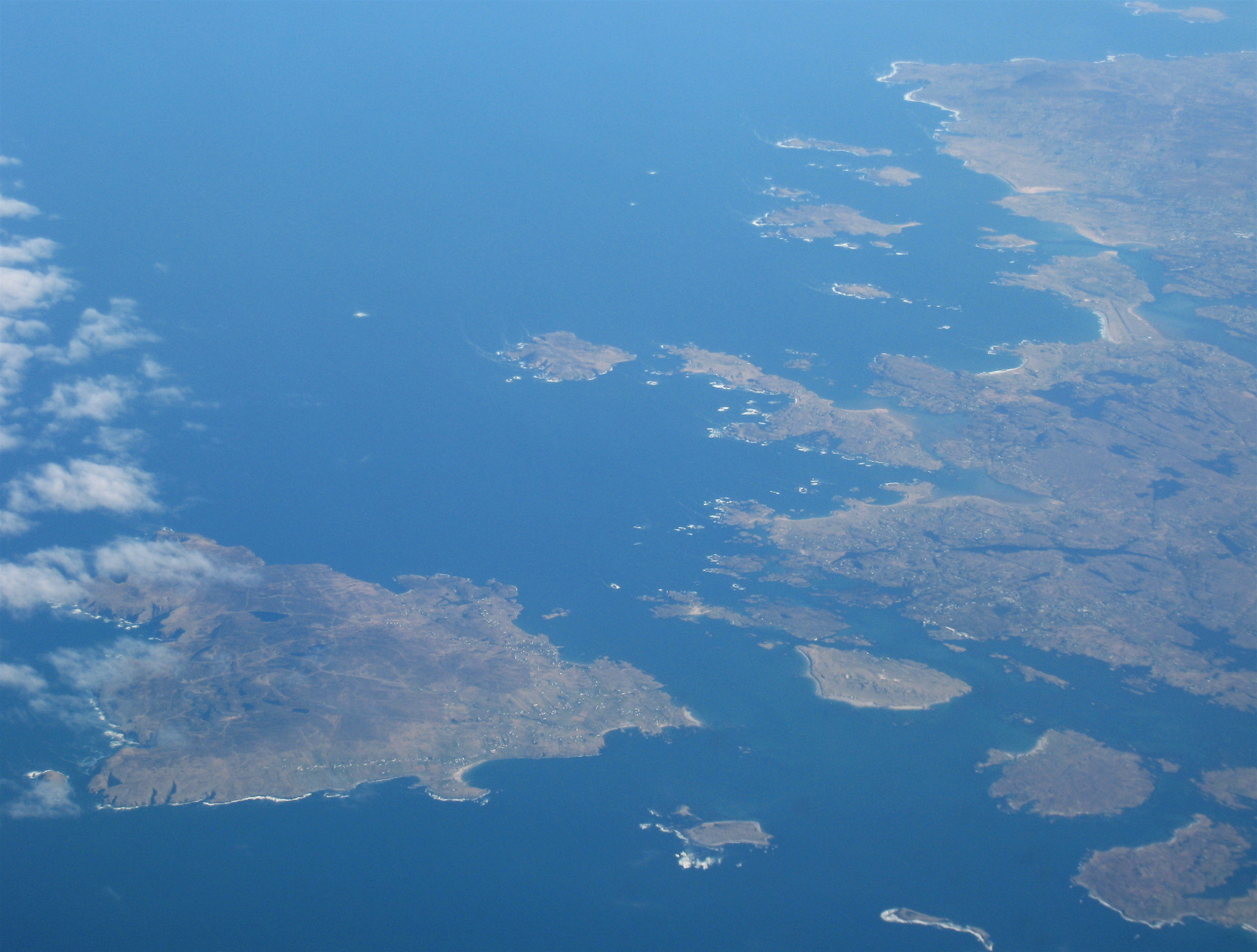
- Aerial view of Arranmore (left)

- Location in Ireland
- Coordinates: 54°59′22″N 8°31′51″W
- Country: Ireland
- Province: Ulster
- County: County Donegal
- Barony: Boylagh
- District: The Rosses

Government
  - Dáil Éireann: Donegal

Area
  - Total: 22 km^{2} (8.5 sq mi)

Population (2022)
  - Total: 478
  - Density: 22/km^{2} (56/sq mi)
- Time zone: UTC+0 (WET)
  - Summer (DST): UTC-1 (IST (WEST))
- Irish Grid Reference: B665155
- Árainn Mhór is the only official name. The anglicised spelling 'Arranmore' has no official status.

Árainn Mhór (English name: Arranmore) is an island off the west coast of County Donegal in the north-west of Ulster, the northern province in Ireland. It is the county's largest inhabited island, with a population of 478 in 2022, but has had a gradually falling native population since the 1990s. Its main settlement is Leabgarrow. The island is part of the Gaeltacht, with most of the inhabitants speaking Ulster Irish.

It is also known in English as Aran Island (not to be confused with the Aran Islands off Galway Bay or the Scottish Isle of Arran). In Irish it was traditionally called Árainn; the adjective mór (large) was added fairly recently. It was also sometimes called Árainn Uí Dhomhnaill, 'Aran of the O'Donnells'.

== Appeal to foreigners ==
In 2019, islanders wrote open letters to the United States and Australia, asking people to consider moving to the island. They encouraged both populations to come to the less crowded island and enjoy "time for living". In 2022, following the 2022 Russian invasion of Ukraine, the island became a refuge for Ukrainian refugees who were resettled in Ireland.

== Irish language ==
As of 2016 there were 469 people living on Arranmore, of which 62% were native Irish speakers. During the summer, students of all ages from all over Ireland travel to the island for a 3-week holiday. It is a very popular way of meeting new people and also learning the Irish language. Students attend school during the day and play games and ceilí dance in the evenings. They are taught about the Irish language through Irish. Irish must be spoken at all times. The college on Arranmore is known as Coláiste Árainn Mhóir, meaning the College of Arranmore.

== Location ==
Traditional housing on Arranmore

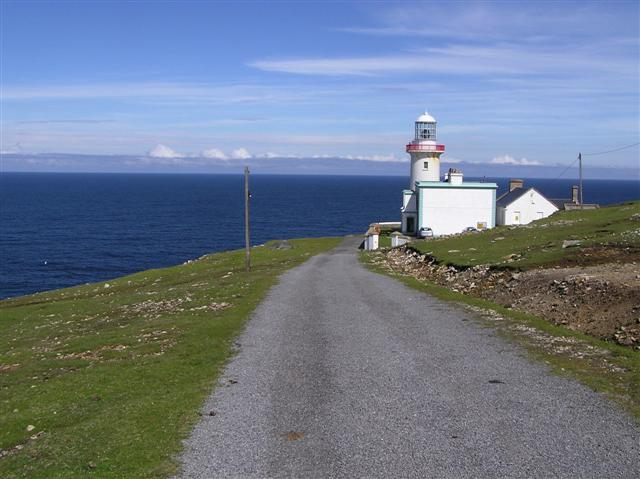
Arranmore Lighthouse

The island lies 5 km (3 mi) off Burtonport, a small coastal village in The Rosses. The island is served by two ferry services, which operate between Arranmore and Burtonport on the mainland.

The two operators make use of bow-loading vessels either custom built for their use, or previously built for the Scottish ferry operator Caledonian MacBrayne (CalMac), allowing both to carry passengers, cars, and heavy-goods vehicles.

== Habitation ==
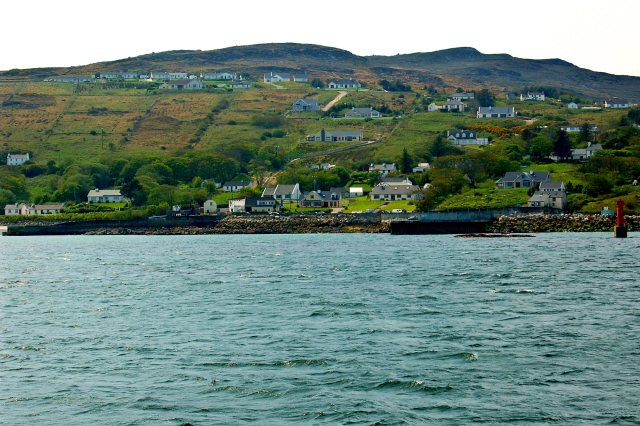
Leabgarrow.

Most of the population lives along the southern and (comparatively sheltered) eastern coast, where the main village, Leabgarrow (Irish: Leadhb Gharbh), is located. The island has been settled since pre-Celtic times, and the few remaining signs of early settlement include a promontory fort to the south of the island and shell middens dotted along the beaches. Its position near the Atlantic shipping lanes was exploited, with a coast guard station and a lighthouse positioned on the most north-westerly point, and a World War II monitoring post.

The permanent population is 478, but this rises to well over 1,000 during the summer. A large proportion of the housing stock is holiday homes, with both native islanders and their descendants, as well as nonlocals. Due to the long decline in population, in 2019, the local government began trying to entice Americans and Australians to move to the island.

Historical population

Year	Pop.	±%
1841	1,431	—
1851	1,166	−18.5%
1861	1,223	+4.9%
1871	1,174	−4.0%
1881	1,163	−0.9%
1891	1,103	−5.2%
1901	1,308	+18.6%
1911	1,533	+17.2%
1926	1,390	−9.3%

Year	Pop.	±%
1936	1,414	+1.7%
1946	1,344	−5.0%
1951	1,249	−7.1%
1956	1,131	−9.4%
1961	948	−16.2%
1966	847	−10.7%
1971	773	−8.7%
1979	825	+6.7%
1981	803	−2.7%

Year	Pop.	±%
1986	735	−8.5%
1991	596	−18.9%
1996	602	+1.0%
2002	543	−9.8%
2006	522	−3.9%
2011	514	−1.5%
2016	469	−8.8%
2022	478	+1.9%

Source: Central Statistics Office. "CNA17: Population by Off Shore Island, Sex and Year". CSO.ie.

== Infrastructure and economy ==
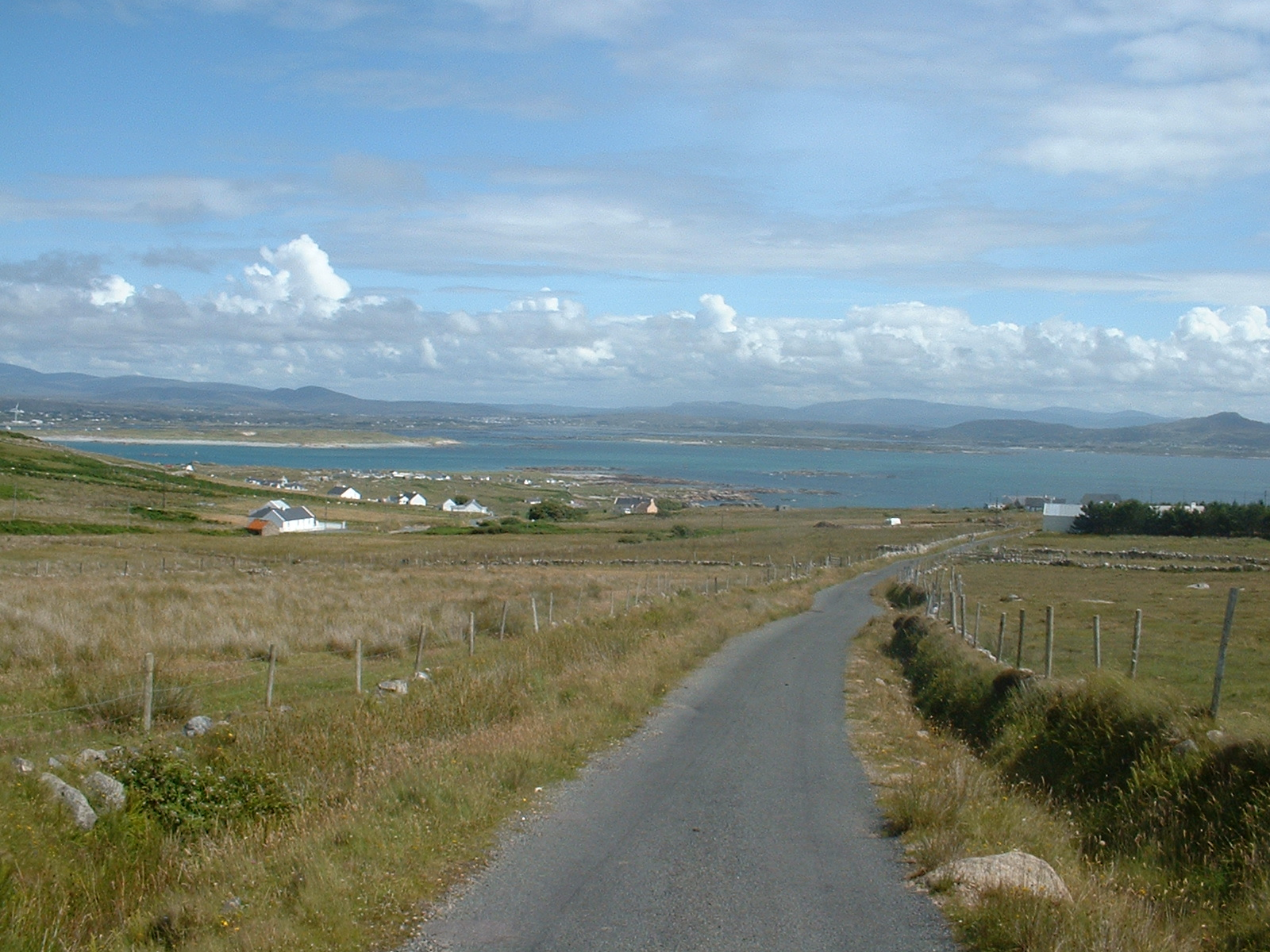
View of Donegal mainland from Arranmore.

The island was the first offshore island in Ireland to get electricity from the Rural Electrification Scheme, run by the E.S.B., in 1957, but was amongst the last places in the country to get universally reliable piped water (in 1973–75) and an automatic phone exchange (in 1986). It went directly from a manual switchboard to an ISDN-enabled system, which had to be upgraded within weeks due to massive demand for consumer phone lines, as the previous exchange had been limited to issuing numbers to business ventures only, and only had 47 internal lines.

It relies mostly on tourism for its income (fishing was the island's mainstay up to the 1980s but is no longer a significant industry), as well as the traditional Gaeltacht summer schools. In recent years, a local development co-op has encouraged the development of other industries on the island, such as a call centre and teacher training for Irish teachers. The island's many lakes provide rod fishing opportunities.

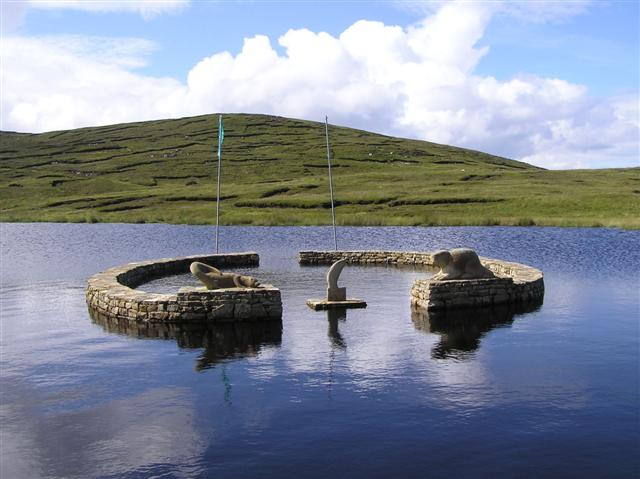
A sculpture at Lough Thoir

A co-working facility was opened in 2019 in partnership with 3 Ireland, providing high-speed internet access which the island did not previously have. 3 have produced a major marketing campaign "The Island" based on this.

Fibre to the home broadband connections have been available via National Broadband Ireland operators since September 2025.

The island has an An Post post office. Despite the population falling below the 500 level which An Post's 2018 review required, all island post offices have been retained.

=== Emergency Services ===
The island has had a based fire engine since the 1980s. A new fire station was built and supplied with a purpose-built fire engine designed for smaller roads in 2005, but has since been deemed sub-standard with a modern station required.

The Royal National Lifeboat Institution (RNLI) station on the island is equipped with the largest class of vessel the service has, a Severn class lifeboat. There has been an RNLI presence on the island since 1883, with the station having moved from Aphort to Leabgarrow and most recently to a purpose-built station at Poolawaddy in 1997, which itself was replaced completely with a more modern structure in 2024..

The crews of the station have been involved in some major rescues over the years, including that of the SS Stolwijk, for which the crew received medals from both the RNLI and the Dutch state. A monument to this rescue was unveiled in 2017.

A helipad was constructed in Aphort in the early 2000s which can land a Sikorsky S-92 aircraft as used by the Irish Coast Guard.

A HSE and previously North Western Health Board ambulance has been based at Arranmore Health Centre for a similar length of time; but has frequently been inoperable. Second-hand vehicles were cascaded to the Health Centre in 2009 and again in 2015 to restore service. Patients are transferred to either the RNLI Lifeboat or Irish Coast Guard helicopter at Leabgarrow or Aphort as required; or can be brought by ferry in non-urgent cases.

=== Arranmore transmitter ===
The Arranmore Island transmitter is a relay Saorview site used by 2RN and Highland Radio to provide coverage to the island and much of The Rosses which are shielded by mountains from the main transmissions. Two towers exist, the smaller of which belongs to Highland Radio, and the significantly larger to 2RN. The EIRP of the Saorview multiplexes are, at 4 kW, amongst the highest of any relay station. The site is 125 metres (410 feet) above sea level, with the 2RN antenna standing at 45 metres (148 feet). FM radio services are also carried.

Three Ireland and Vodafone Ireland have LTE equipment on the 2RN mast, with Eir (telecommunications) having 3G equipment.

==== Services ====
FM radio

- 89.6Mhz - RTÉ Radio 1
- 91.8Mhz - RTÉ 2FM
- 94.0Mhz - RTÉ Raidió na Gaeltachta
- 95.2Mhz - Highland Radio
- 99.2Mhz - RTÉ Lyric FM
- 104.0Mhz - iRadio

Saorview

- 655.25Mhz - Multiplex 2
- 679.25Mhz - Multiplex 1

== Twinning ==
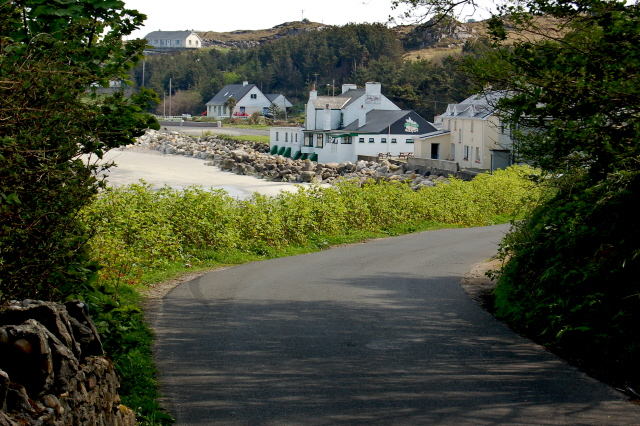
Main coastal road to Aphort.

The island is twinned with Beaver Island, an island in northern Lake Michigan where a large number of former residents gathered after being evicted from Arranmore in the mid-1800s. There are still today a number of families on Beaver Island that trace their roots to Arranmore. A monument to the twinning has been placed in the island's main reservoir.

== Cultural references ==
"The Storm Keeper's Island" by Catherine Doyle (Whose grandparents lived in Arranmore) is set here. It is fictional however.

The Donegal band Goats Don't Shave released a track entitled Arranmore on their 1994 album "Out In The Open", which references the island's history of emigration and the North West Donegal "Tunnel Tigers", many of which came from Arranmore

== Places and villages on Arranmore Island ==
- Aphort
- Plohogue
- Fallagowan
- Ballintra
- Ballard
- Illion
- Leabgarrow (main settlement)
- Leabrannagh
- Pollawaddy
- Scraigatoke
- Torries
- Rannagh Park

== Notable people ==
- Anna Ní Ghallachair, academic
- Róise Rua (died 1964), singer
- Mike Gallagher (died 1984), footballer
- Charles Ward (born 1977) - Irish politician

== See also ==
- Lighthouses in Ireland
- List of RNLI stations
- Eighter Island
- Inishcoo
- Rutland Island
