= Valentin Iremonger =

Irish poet and diplomat

Valentin Iremonger (14 February 1918 – 22 May 1991) was an Irish diplomat and poet.

He was born on Valentine's Day in Sandymount, Dublin and was educated by the Christian Brothers in Synge Street CBS and at Coláiste Mhuire, which he attended on scholarship. In 1946 Iremonger started working as a civil servant, in the Department of Education, but quickly moved to the Department of External Affairs. In April 1948 he married Sheila Manning, an actress at the Abbey Theatre with a common interest in Gaelic drama. Iremonger went on to serve as Irish Ambassador to Sweden, Norway, Finland, India, Luxembourg and Portugal.

His poetry collections include One Recent Evening (1944, with Robert Greacen and Bruce Williamson), On the Barricades (1944, with Robert Greacen and Bruce Williamson) Reservations (1950), Horan's Field and Other Reservations (1972), and Sandymount (1988). In 1945 he won the Æ Memorial Prize for a manuscript collection of poems. He was poetry editor of the literary magazine Envoy from 1949 to 1951.

He also produced translations from the Irish language, including Dialann Deoraí by Dónall Mac Amhlaigh, (An Irish Navvy, 1964); and Rotha Mór an tSaoil by Micí Mac Gabhann (The Hard Road to Klondike, 1973), and a translation of the German poet Rilke (Beatha Mhuire /sraith dhánta Ghearmáinise le Rainer Maria Rilke, 1990). A radio play, Wrap Up My Green Jacket was broadcast by the BBC.

He edited, with Robert Greacen, Contemporary Irish Poetry (1949); and Irish Short Stories (1960).
