= Seán Ó hEochaidh =

Irish folklorist (1913–2002)

Seán Ó hEochaidh (9 February 1913 – 18 January 2002) was an Irish folklorist.

== Biography ==
A native of Teelin, County Donegal, Ó hEochaidh worked as a fisherman in his youth. Despite a basic education, from an early age he made a written record of the oral folklore of his area. In 1935, Séamus Ó Duilearga of the Irish Folklore Commission appointed Ó hEochaidh to be full-time folklore collector for the Gaeltacht area of Donegal. Besides keeping written records, Ó hEochaidh recorded stories and songs on wax cylinders. In some cases, all his powers of persuasion were needed, as some viewed his 56 lb Ediphone as the work of the Devil. Up to a dozen cylinders could be recorded in the course of a single day, all of which he painstakingly transcribed in meticulous handwriting by night. He once estimated that he spoke to at least one thousand five hundred people.

His detailed obituary in The Guardian concurred, noting that 'His is the largest collection of Irish folklore ever compiled by one individual.'

During the 1960s, at the invitation of his friend, Professor Heinrich Wagner, he and others briefly guest lectured at Queen's University, Belfast, in the Department of Celtic Studies. With the dissolution of the Irish Folklore Commission in 1971, he joined the Department of Irish Folklore at University College, Dublin (UCD). In 1988, he received an honorary doctorate in Celtic literature from University College, Galway (UCG). The following year, he was made President of the Oireachtas, the Gaelic cultural festival held yearly in different locations. In 1989, it was held in Ó hEochaidh's native Glencolmcille in the south-west of County Donegal. In 1995, he was named Donegal Person of the Year.

== Publications ==
Ó hEochaidh's published work included an edition of the autobiography of his father-in-law, Micí Mac Gabhann (1865–1948), published in 1959 as Rotha Mór an tSaoil. It won an Irish book award.

It was in 1973 translated by Valentin Iremonger as The Hard Road to Klondike (1973).

With Máire Mac Néill and Séamas Ó Catháin, he produced Síscéalta ó Thír Chonaill ("Fairy Legends From Donegal") in 1978.

== Personal life ==
His wife, Anna Ní Gabhann, died in 1996. He was survived by his brother Tomás and sister Cáit.
