= Leabgarrow =

Gaeltacht village in County Donegal, Ireland

Coordinates: 54°59′16″N 8°30′10″W

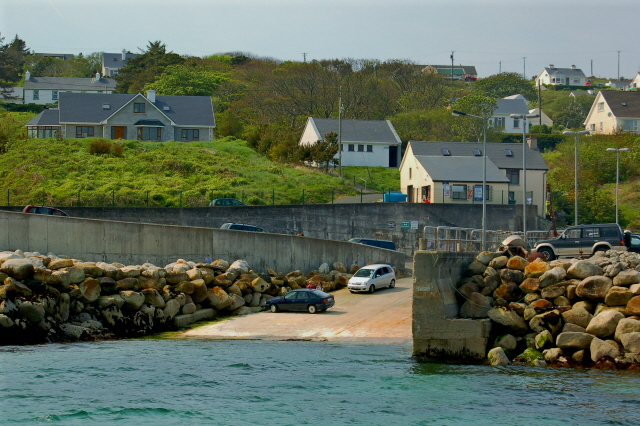
Leabgarrow harbour.

An Leadhb Gharbh (anglicized as Leabgarrow) is a Gaeltacht village on Arranmore Island, which is to the west of County Donegal about three miles from Burtonport. The island's post office, secondary school and ferry port are located in Leabgarrow. Leabgarrow also hosts a cafe and numerous pubs and bars.

The islands co-working facility intended for remote workers is located in Leabgarrow.

== See also ==
- List of towns and villages in Ireland
