= Colette Ní Ghallchóir =

Irish poet

Colette Ní Ghallchóir (born 1950, County Donegal, Ireland) is an Irish poet.

== Works ==
- Idir dhá Ghleann, Baile Átha Cliath, Coiscéim, 1999
- An Chéad Chló, Gallimh, Cló Iar Chonnachta
