= The Fiddler of Dooney =

The Fiddler of Dooney

When I play on my fiddle in Dooney,
Folk dance like a wave of the sea;
My cousin is priest in Kilvarnet,
My brother in Mocharabuiee.

I passed my brother and cousin:
They read in their books of prayer;
I read in my book of songs
I bought at the Sligo fair.

When we come at the end of time
To Peter sitting in state,
He will smile on three old spirits,
But call me first through the gate;

For the good are always the merry,
Save by an evil chance,
And the merry love the fiddle,
And the merry love to dance:

And when the folk there spy me,
They will all come up to me,
With 'Here is the fiddler of Dooney!'
And dance like a wave of the sea.
-W.B. Yeats

"The Fiddler of Dooney" is a poem by William Butler Yeats first published in 1892.

The word "Dooney" refers to Dooney Rock, a small hill overlooking Lough Gill near Sligo.

== Influences ==
The poem gives its name to a fiddle competition held annually in County Sligo, first held in 1975.

The poem is set to music by Angelo Branduardi (on Branduardi canta Yeats, 1986).

== See also ==
- List of works by William Butler Yeats
