= Micí Mac Gabhann =

Irish author (1865–1948)

- Born: 22 November 1865; Doire Chonaire, Cloughaneely, County Donegal, Ireland
- Died: 29 November 1948 (aged 83); An Caiseal, Cloughaneely, County Donegal, Ireland
- Occupation: Seanchaí
- Spouse: Máire Dixon

Micí Mac Gabhann (22 November 1865 – 29 November 1948) was a seanchaí and memoirist from the County Donegal Gaeltacht. He is best known for his posthumously published Irish diaspora memoir Rotha Mór an tSaoil (1959). It was dictated to his folklorist son-in law Seán Ó hEochaidh and polished for publication by Proinsias Ó Conluainn. The account won wide praise and was translated into English by Valentin Iremonger as The Hard Road to Klondike (1962).

== Life ==
=== Early life ===
Micí Mac Gabhann was born "in a little thatched cottage" near the Atlantic Ocean in the townland of Derryconnor on 22 November 1865. His parents' names were Tomás Mac Gabhann and Bríd Ní Chanainn.

As a boy, he witnessed the pervasive making of poitin by local families, the resulting violence between local residents and law enforcement, and the imprisonment of his own father for poitin-making.

Despite the fact that he had spent some time attending the district school at Magheraroarty, Mac Gabhann lamented that he never knew enough English to understand the teacher. He later attributed his education to local resident Sean Johnny, who had attended a hedge school as a youth and who taught Mac Gabhann and other local boys according to the same method.

=== The Hiring Fairs ===
In May 1874, the Mac Gabhann family had become so destitute that a widowed Bríd brought her 8-year-old son to a hiring fair in Letterkenny. There, wealthy farmers and landowners "were looking for boys that would herd and give a bit of service around and for bigger boys that would help with the agricultural work." After bargaining through an interpreter, a landowner from Glenveagh bought Micí until the following November in return for the sum of £1 paid to his mother. As he said a brief and painful farewell to her, Micí noticed that his mother, "was tightening up her face as though a dagger was going through her heart."

Micí later recalled, "I was on my way to the Lagan. The people of Cloghaneely at that time called anywhere eastwards, from Muckish Mountain to County Armagh, 'The Lagan'. That part of the country hadn't got a very good reputation in our neighborhood. When anyone referred to the Lagan it meant slavery, struggle, extortion, and work from morning till night. All the stories I had heard about it were wheeling around in my mind as the horse was trotting up the street of Letterkenny."

During his months herding cattle near Glenveagh, Mac Gabhann befriended many local residents, learned a considerable amount of English, and listened to stories about the mass evictions decreed in 1861 by landowner Captain John George Adair. In November 1874, he completed his indenture and returned home.

In May 1875, Micí and his mother returned to the Letterkenny hiring fair. After spending the night in a ceilidh house and listening to a fairy tale that adapted the concept of the Rota Fortunae from Roman mythology into Irish folklore and which he would always remember, Micí was hired out to "Sam Dubh", an Ulster Scots farmer from Drumoghill townland, where he lived and worked until November.

Micí had been told growing up that the Ulster Scots people have, "no lore and no superstitions", and was shocked to find that many Presbyterians in Drumoghill believed every bit as firmly in ghosts and in, "the little people", as the Irish Catholic population of Donegal. Particularly fascinating to Micí was Billy Craig, an Ulster Scots seanchaí. Billy Craig told Micí that the fairies of Connaught had once declared war on the fairies of Ulster. Shortly before the battle, the fairies of Ulster had visited a local woman named Curly Mary and told her that, if they were defeated, the water from her well would be the color of blood. When Curly Mary's well water ran red with blood the next morning, she knew that the "little people" of Ulster had been defeated. Since then, according to Billy Craig, the "little people", had never again been seen in Drumoghill or anywhere else in Ulster.

=== Scotland ===
By the time that he was fifteen, Mac Gabhann had spent five or six seasons being hired out to various different masters and mistresses in, "The Lagan." Shortly before St. Patrick's Day, 1880, however, Micí and a young male relative named Conal Eileen made the decision to leave Cloghaneely for Scotland. As their fathers would not be going with them, Micí and Conal decided to gather supplies for the journey in secret and leave the village during the celebrations for the Feast Day. At that time, departing for Scotland was very common among the young people of Cloghaneely and both Micí and Conal knew that once they were not found in the morning, it would be easily guessed where they had gone.

== Legacy ==
- A bronze sculpture, The Hiring Fair, by artist Maurice Harron, is inspired by the book and was installed at Market Square in Letterkenny in 1994.
- In 2002, Mac Gabhann's "St. Patrick’s Day in the Klondike" was read aloud in Irish, Welsh, and English at Cardiff, for the St. Patrick's Day Ceremony of Remembrance and Reflection, at the Wales National Great Famine Memorial, Cathays Cemetery.
- A culture night was also held at Mac Gabhann's house, near Magheraroarty, in September 2013.
