= Vasco Abadjiev =

Bulgarian virtuoso violinist (1926-1978)

Vasco Abadjiev making his international debut in 1932 in Vienna at the age of 6

Vasco Abadjiev (Bulgarian: Васко Абаджиев, Vasko Abadzhiev) (14 January 1926 – 14 December 1978) was a Bulgarian virtuoso violinist. He was the son of Nikola Abadjiev, a violin professor at the Sofia Conservatory, and Lala Piperova, a pianist.

== Biography ==
Abadijev was born in Sofia, then part of the Kingdom of Bulgaria.

A child prodigy, as early as June 1932, at the age of six, he played in Vienna before the jury of the first international competition in violin. The six-year-old child became the sensation of the contest and was one of the youngest violinists to make his international debut in the twentieth century. By the age of nine, Abadjiev already had a secondary school diploma, and in 1936 he left for Brussels, Belgium with his parents. There, in 1937, he received the Special Prize.

In May 1938 he was awarded the First Prize and gold medal at the VI International violin competition in Liège. He also received the first prize of the Brussels conservatoire and a gold medal from King Leopold III, whom he visited in the palace. At 13 years old he graduated from the Brussels conservatoire with the highest distinction, and commenced a concert tour around Belgium, Germany, France, Italy, Denmark and Sweden.

At the beginning of World War II, the Abadjiev family settled in Berlin, where Vasco perfected playing the violin and piano, composition, and counterpoint. He gave concerts under the conductor's baton of Wilhelm Furtwängler, Karl Böhm, Heinz Bongartz, Hermann Abendroth, Willem Mengelberg and other famous conductors, and played in numerous ensembles for chamber music or solo concerts. The harsh war and post-war years affected the extremely sensitive mentality of Vasco Abadjiev. After the death of his father in 1947 he spared considerable time for composition and chamber music.

From 1952 to 1956 he lived with his mother almost exclusively in Bulgaria, where he gave many concerts, recitals and concerts with orchestras and in 1952 was honoured with the highest distinction for culture in Bulgaria, the Dimitrov Award 1st degree. He resettled in Germany with his mother after 1956. After the death of his beloved mother in 1965, his life was plagued with sadness and tragedy. He was involved in a car accident, had numerous illnesses, financial problems and suffered from loneliness. On 14 December 1978 Abadjiev was found dead on the city railway in Hamburg.

Many of Abadjiev's performances and records belong in the Golden Fund of the Bulgarian National Radio. He was especially noted for his interpretations of compositions by Bach and Paganini. In 2009, the Bulgarian novelist Margarit Abadjiev wrote a biographical novel about the life of Abadjiev entitled Shakona pasion.
