= Margaret Dobbs =

Irish scholar and playwright

- Born: Margaret Emmeline Conway Dobbs; 19 November 1871; Dublin, Ireland
- Died: 2 January 1962 (aged 90); Portnagolan House, Cushendall, County Antrim, Northern Ireland
- Occupations: writer, scholar

Margaret Emmeline Dobbs (19 November 1871 – 2 January 1962) was an Irish scholar and playwright, best known for her work to preserve the Irish language.

== Life and career ==
Dobbs was born at 41 Lower Leeson Street in Dublin on 19 November 1871, the fourth child to barrister Conway Edward Dobbs and Sara Mulholland. Her father was Justice of the Peace for County Antrim, High Sheriff for Carrickfergus in 1875 and High Sheriff for County Louth in 1882. The family spent time living in Dublin where Dobbs was born. She attempted to learn Irish. However, when her father died in 1898 her mother moved the family back to Glenariff. Her mother was Sarah Mulholland, daughter of St Clair Kelvin Mulholland Eglantine, Co. Down.

Dobbs was interested in learning Irish and found it easier to learn in Donegal where it was still spoken. Her first teacher was Hugh Flaitile. She attended the Irish College at Cloughaneely in the Donegal Gaeltacht. She brought the idea of promoting the language to the Glens of Antrim and her circle of friends. Dobbs was one of the small number of Protestant women interested in the Gaelic revival.

1904 saw the "Great Feis" in Antrim and Dobbs was a founder member of the Feis na nGleann committee and later a tireless literary secretary. In 1946, the Feis committee decided to honour her by presenting her with an illuminated address. It can be seen today at Portnagolan House with its stained glass windows commemorating a great Irishwoman. During her speech she said: ‘Ireland is a closed book to those who do not know her language. No one can know Ireland properly until one knows the language. Her treasures are hidden as a book unopened. Open the book and learn to love your language’.

Dobbs wrote seven plays, published by Dundalgan Press in 1920, though only three were performed. The Doctor and Mrs McAuley won the Warden trophy for one-act plays at the Belfast festival in 1913. However her plays were generally not a success and after 1920 she never wrote another. She continued to work on historical and archaeological studies and her articles were published in the Ulster Journal of Archaeology, in a German magazine for Celtic studies, in the French Revue Cletique and in the Irish magazine Eriu.

Roger Casement was a good friend and although Dobbs never made her political opinions known she contributed to his defence costs when he was accused of treason. Although her political views were not clearly known Dobbs had been a member of the Gaelic League and in the executive of Cumann na mBan.

She died at her home, Portnagolan House, Cushendall, on 2 January 1962.
