= Cumann Gaelach na hEaglaise =

Irish Guild of the Church of Ireland

- Formation: 1916
- Type: Irish language, Church of Ireland
- Website: www.gaeleaglais.ie

Cumann Gaelach na hEaglaise (English: Irish Guild of the Church of Ireland) is the Irish language society of the Church of Ireland. The society was founded in 1914, with aims to:

- promote the preservation of the spirit of the ancient Celtic Church within the Church of Ireland, and provide a focus for members of the church inspired by Irish ideals,
- promote the use of the Irish language within the church,
- collect hymns and other appropriate spiritual material of Irish origin,
- promote the use of Irish music and art in the church.

The society provided a bilingual service book to allow Irish and English to be used in parallel.
