= Irish language (disambiguation) =

The Irish language is a modern Goidelic language spoken in Ireland, also known as Irish Gaelic or Gaeilge. Irish language may also refer to:

- Hiberno-English, the dialect of English written and spoken in Ireland
- Languages of Ireland, an overview of languages spoken in Ireland, including Northern Ireland and the Republic of Ireland
- Languages of Northern Ireland, an overview of languages spoken in Northern Ireland
- Shelta, a mixed English/Irish cant spoken by Irish Travellers
