= Languages of Northern Ireland =

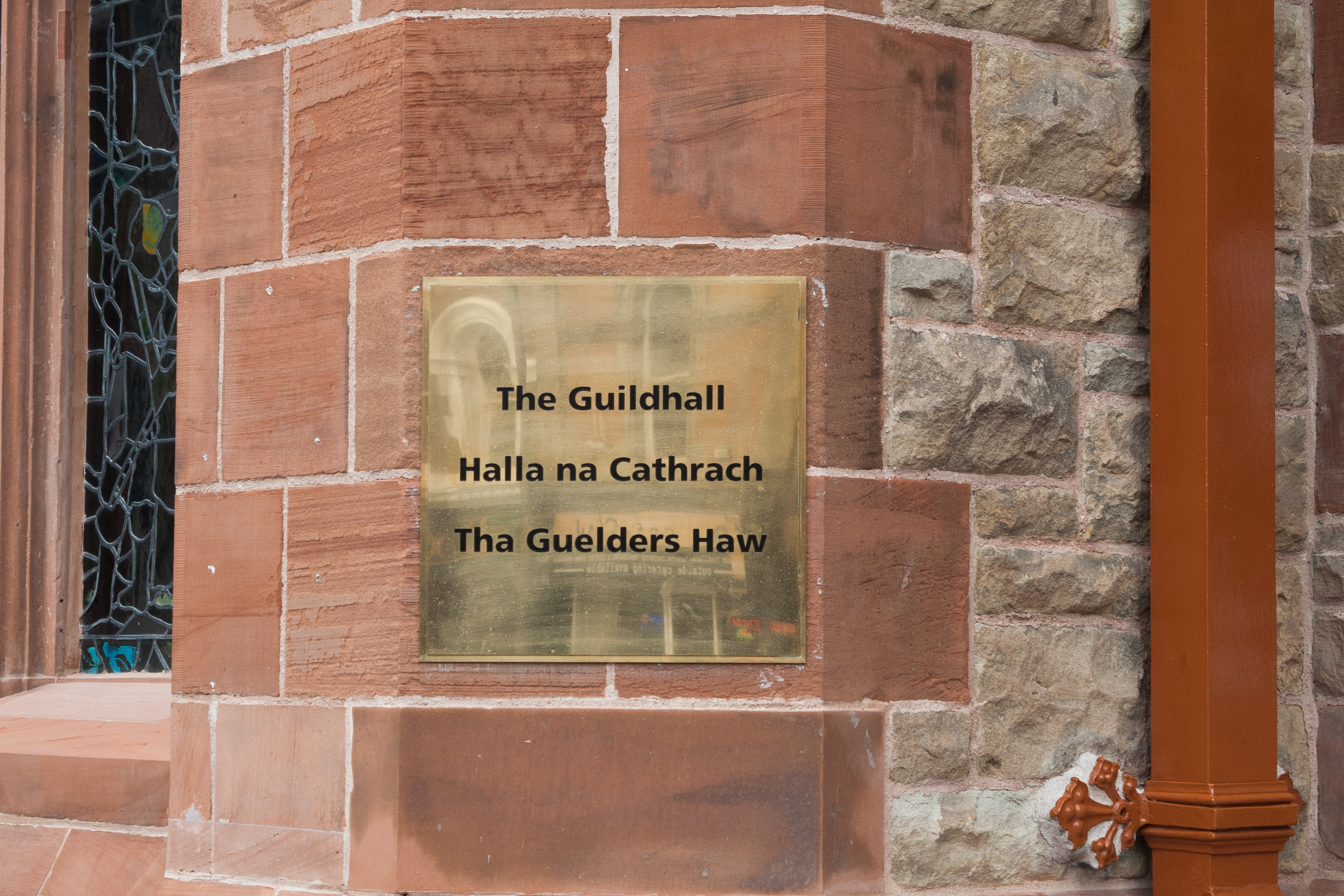
- Sign in English, Irish and Scots at Derry Guildhall
- Official: English, Irish
- National: English (99.17%)
- Vernacular: Ulster English, Hiberno-English, Ulster Irish
- Minority: Irish (0.3% main usage, 12% knowledge), Ulster Scots (8% knowledge)
- Immigrant: Polish (1.1% main usage), Lithuanian (0.5% main usage), Romanian (0.3% main usage)
- Signed: Northern Ireland Sign Language, British Sign Language, Irish Sign Language
- Keyboard layout: QWERTY

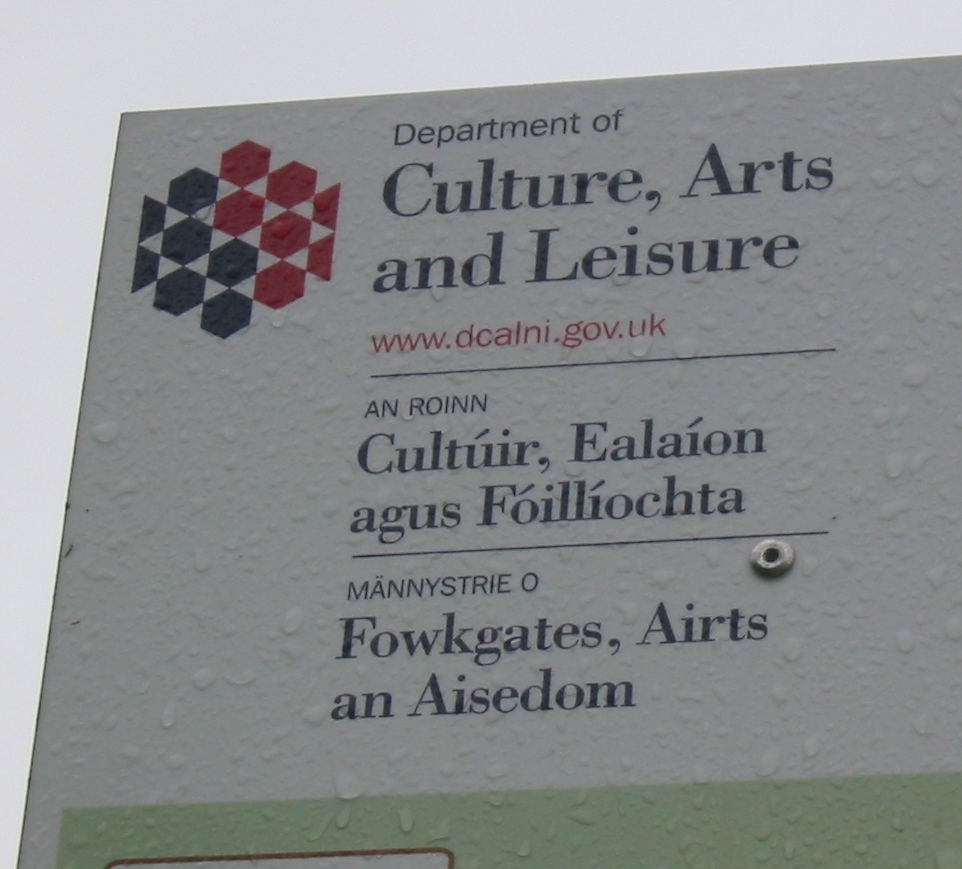
The brand identity of the now dissolved Department of Culture, Arts and Leisure in Northern Ireland as shown on this sign is displayed in English, Irish, and Ulster Scots

English and Irish are the co-official languages of Northern Ireland. English is by far the most spoken, and the de facto national language of Northern Ireland; it occurs in various forms, including Ulster English and Hiberno-English. Irish is an official language of Northern Ireland since 2022, and the local variety of Scots, known as Ulster Scots, has official minority status, with services in the language provided by public authorities. Northern Ireland Sign Language and Irish Sign Language have also been recognised with minority status since 29 March 2004.

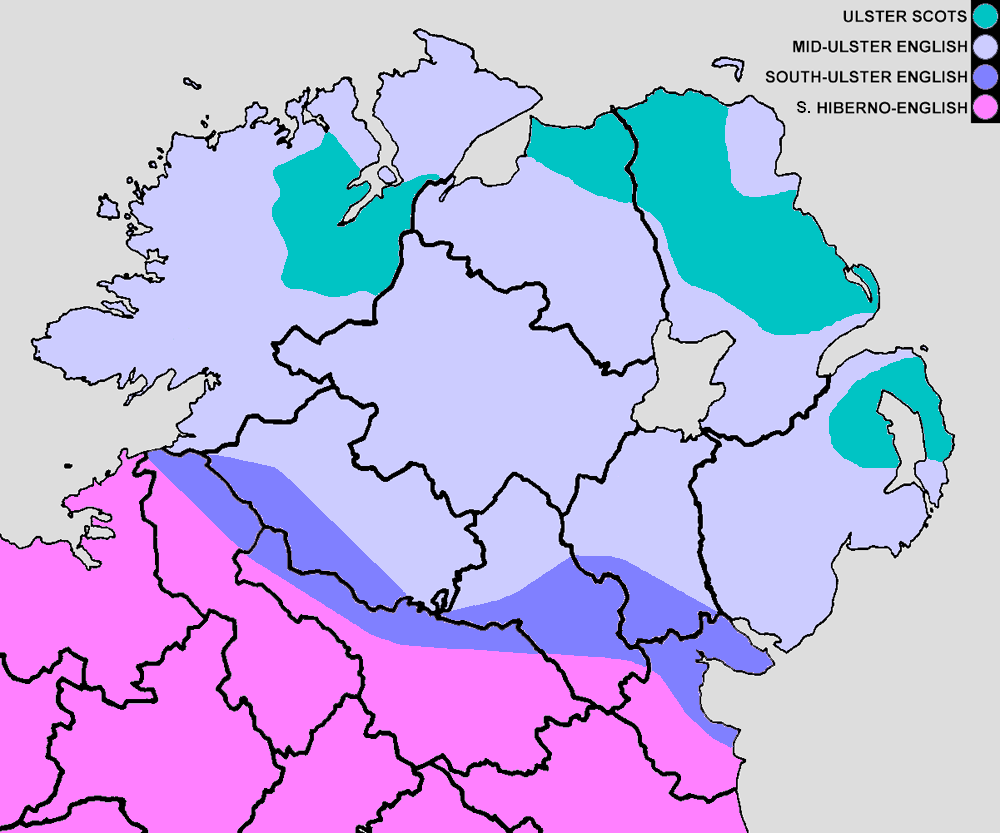
Approximate boundaries of the current and historical English/Scots dialects in Ulster. Mid-Ulster English is in light blue. Ulster Scots (green) is no longer spoken in that entire area. The Irish-speaking Gaeltacht is not shown.

Before legislation passed in 2022 that allowed the use of Irish in courts, the Administration of Justice (Language) Act (Ireland) 1737 also officially prohibited the use of languages other than English in legal proceedings, though this act is now repealed.

The Irish used in Northern Ireland is primarily of the Ulster Irish dialect, with An Caighdéan (the standardised written Irish of the Republic of Ireland) rarely encountered.

Under the Good Friday Agreement, Irish and Ulster Scots (an Ulster dialect of the Scots language, sometimes known as Ullans), are recognised as "part of the cultural wealth of Northern Ireland". Two all-island bodies for the promotion of these were created under the Agreement: Foras na Gaeilge, which promotes the Irish language, and the Ulster Scots Agency, which promotes the Ulster Scots dialect and culture. These operate separately under the aegis of the North/South Language Body, which reports to the North/South Ministerial Council.

The British government in 2001 ratified the European Charter for Regional or Minority Languages. Irish (in Northern Ireland) was specified under Part III of the Charter, with a range of specific undertakings in relation to education, translation of statutes, interaction with public authorities, the use of placenames, media access, support for cultural activities and other matters. A lower level of recognition was accorded to Ulster Scots, under Part II of the Charter.

The earliest linguistic records from what is now Northern Ireland are of Primitive Irish, from about the 5th century AD. Languages spoken in Iron Age Ireland before then are now irretrievable, although there are some claims of traces in toponymy, including in Northern Ireland. Shelta, a mixed language spoken by Irish Travellers (Rilantu Mincéirí), is also native to Ireland.

== English ==
The dialect of English spoken in Northern Ireland shows influence from the lowland Scots language.

== Irish ==
Percentage of people aged 3+ claiming to have some ability in Irish in the 2011 census

The Irish language (Irish: an Ghaeilge), or Gaelic, is a native language of the island of Ireland. It was spoken predominantly throughout what is now Northern Ireland before the Ulster Plantations in the 17th century and most place names in Northern Ireland are anglicised versions of a Gaelic name. Today, the language is associated with Irish nationalism (and thus with the Catholic community). However, in the 19th century, the language was seen as a common heritage, with Ulster Protestants playing a leading role in the Gaelic revival.

In the 2021 census, 12.4% of the population (from age 3 up) of Northern Ireland claimed some knowledge of Irish, up from 11% in 2011. 0.3% claimed to use it at home, up from 0.2% in 2011. In a survey in 1999, 1% of respondents said they spoke it as their main language at home.

The dialect generally spoken in Northern Ireland, Ulster Irish or Donegal Irish, is the one closest to Scottish Gaelic (which developed into a separate language from Irish Gaelic in the 10th century). Some words and phrases are shared with Scots Gaelic, and the extinct dialects of east Ulster – those of Rathlin Island and the Glens of Antrim – were very similar to the dialect of Argyll, one of the parts of Scotland nearest to Northern Ireland.

Use of the Irish language in Northern Ireland today is politically sensitive. Since 2022 the languages holds official status in a manner similar to the Welsh-English bilingual status in Wales, though the erection by some district councils of bilingual street names in both English and Irish, invariably in predominantly nationalist districts, is resisted by some unionists who claim that it creates a "chill factor" and thus harms community relationships. Before the intervention of Westminster in 2022 to make Irish an official language, efforts by members of the Northern Ireland Assembly to legislate for some official uses of the language failed to achieve the required cross-community support.

== Ulster Scots ==
Percentage of people aged 3+ claiming to have some ability in Ulster Scots in the 2011 census

Ulster Scots comprises varieties of the Scots language spoken in Northern Ireland. For a native English speaker, "[Ulster Scots] is comparatively accessible, and even at its most intense can be understood fairly easily with the help of a glossary."

Along with the Irish language, the Good Friday Agreement recognised the dialect as part of Northern Ireland's unique culture and the St Andrews Agreement recognised the need to "enhance and develop the Ulster Scots language, heritage and culture". The language is officially recognised as a minority language in Northern Ireland, and public authorities must provide services in the language.

Approximately 2% of the population claim to speak Ulster Scots. The number speaking it as their main language in their home is low, with only 0.9% of 2011 census respondents claiming to be able to speak, read, write and understand Ulster-Scots. 8.1% professed to have "some ability" however.

== Sign languages ==
The most common sign language in Northern Ireland is Northern Ireland Sign Language (NISL). However, since, in the past, Catholic families tended to send their deaf children to schools in Dublin where Irish Sign Language (ISL) is commonly used. ISL is still common among many older deaf people from Catholic families.

Irish Sign Language (ISL) has some influence from the French family of sign language, which includes American Sign Language (ASL). NISL takes a large component from the British family of sign language (which also includes Auslan) with many borrowings from ASL. It is described as being related to Irish Sign Language at the syntactic level while much of the lexicon is based on British Sign Language (BSL) and American Sign Language.

As of March 2004 the British Government recognises only British Sign Language and Irish Sign Language as the official sign languages used in Northern Ireland.

== Immigrant languages ==
At the 2001 census, Chinese was the most widely spoken immigrant language in Northern Ireland, with Arabic and Portuguese also spoken by a significant number of people. However, an influx of people from recent EU accession states significantly increased numbers of speakers of languages from these countries. In the 2011 census, Polish was the most widely spoken immigrant language, followed by Lithuanian.

== Extinct languages ==
None of these languages were spoken by a majority of the population, but are of historical interest, giving loan words to Ulster Scots, Irish and Hiberno-English.

=== Latin ===
Latin was introduced by the early Christians by c.500. It remained a church language, but also was the official language after the Norman conquest in 1171. It was used by the Roman Catholic church for services until the Vatican II reforms in 1962–65.

=== Norman language ===
Norman settlers introduced the Norman or Anglo-Norman language during the Norman invasion of Ireland of 1169. From it derived "Law French", that continues to be used today for certain legal purposes in both jurisdictions on the island.
