= Verb framing =

Concept in linguistics

In linguistics, verb-framing and satellite-framing are typological descriptions of a way that verb phrases in a language can describe the path of motion or the manner of motion, respectively. Only some languages make the distinction.

== Manner and path ==
The manner of motion refers to a type of distinct motion described by a particular verb, such as running, tumbling, sliding, walking, and crawling. The path of motion refers to the direction of the movement, such as movement into, out of, and across. The two concepts may be encoded in the verb as part of its root meaning or encoded in a separate particle associated with the verb (a "satellite"). Manner or path may also not be expressed at all.

Languages are considered verb-framed or satellite-framed based on how the motion path is typically encoded. English verbs use particles to show the path of motion ("run away", "go out", "fall down"), and its verbs usually show manner of motion; thus, English is a satellite-framed language. Most verbs that are exceptions in English are derived from Latin such as "exit", "ascend", and "enter".

All Germanic languages are satellite-framed languages. Accordingly, "to go out" is hinausgehen in German, uitgaan in Dutch, and gå ut in Swedish in which gehen / gaan / gå are equivalents of "to go", and hinaus / uit / ut are equivalents of "out". In that manner, Germanic languages can form all kinds of compounds, even less manifest ones like (German) hinaustanzen "to dance out".

On the other hand, Romance languages are predominantly verb-framed. Spanish, for example, makes heavy use of verbs of motion like entrar, salir, subir, bajar ("go in", "go out", "go up", "go down"), which directly encode motion path and may avoid the manner of motion or express it in a complement of manner (typically a participle): entró corriendo "he/it ran in", literally "he/it entered running"; salió flotando "he/it floated out", literally "he/it exited floating".

The terms "verb framing" and "satellite framing" are not restricted to Romance and Germanic languages, respectively. Many other languages can be assigned to one of the two systems. For example, verb framing is used in Turkish, Hebrew and Arabic (in the last example, dakhala rākiḍan means "he entered running", with the perfect form dakhala meaning "he entered" and the participle rākiḍan meaning "running"). Satellite framing is common in Greek.

Some languages use both strategies. For example, Persian is chiefly verb-framed but also has such compounds as dar-āmadan (درآمدن, "to come in") from dar ("in") and āmadan ("to come").

== Examples from English and French ==
The Romance languages, such as French, are normally verb-framed, and the Germanic languages, such as English, are satellite-framed. To express motion events, English typically expresses manner in the verb, and French typically expresses path in the verb and either avoid the manner of motion completely or express it in a complement of manner. For example, "He ran into the room" is routinely translated as 'Il entra dans la pièce en courant' ("he entered the room running"). That means that the verb itself normally does not express manner in French, as opposed to what is generally the case in English, and that if manner is expressed, it is expressed in a complement (or, more precisely, an adjunct) of manner: en courant ("running").

The question remains of whether to express manner. It is not always easy to know, but manner is generally left unexpressed when it can be considered to be self-evident and inferred from the context. Expressing the manner then tends to sound unnatural. Thus, "He ran into the room" can be translated as Il entra dans la pièce en courant because it is slightly unusual to run into a room and so manner should be mentioned. However, translating "He walked into the room" as Il est entré dans la pièce à pied ("on foot") or en marchant ("walking") is distinctly odd because it calls unintended attention to the usual way in which one enters a room and is akin to saying in English "he entered the room walking."

Only in a case in which walking would be considered unusual or notable, such as in talking about a crippled person, can the fact that he "walked" into the room be considered to be relevant. Likewise, saying "I'm flying to London" is normal in English, but saying Je vole ("I'm flying") in French for the same situation is odd because the verb is not one for which manner should be normally expressed in the first place, and flying is also a common way to travel to London from France. However, the formulation "Je m'envole pour Londres" ("I'm taking off for London") can also be found, as a more figurative expression.

This means that the choice of complement, particularly the choice of the preposition, may also be affected. In English, the particle or the prepositional phrase (the "satellite") has the path expressed by the use of a dynamic preposition: "(walk) into (the room)", "(fly) to (London)." However, in French, the verb normally expresses the path. A preposition like à ("to, at, in") is ambiguous between a static reading (Je suis à Paris, "I'm in Paris") and a dynamic reading (Je vais à Paris, "I'm going to Paris"). If the verb is dynamic and expresses directed motion (motion with an intrinsic direction), à can express movement (Je vais à Paris). If not, as is the case for instance with voler ("to fly"), which expresses manner of motion but not directed motion, à tends to receive a static, not a dynamic, interpretation: je vole à Paris would mean something like "I'm flying IN Paris." not "I'm flying TO Paris.", or could even be misconstrued as "I am stealing in Paris", due to homophony of the two verbs. Using the same structure in French as directly translated from English may be doubly misleading, as both the verb and the preposition are unusual: Je vais à ("I'm going to") or Je suis en route ("I am on my way") vers/pour Paris ("towards/for Paris") are much clearer in meaning.

== Opposition and its limitations ==
Although languages can generally be classified as "verb-framed" and "satellite-framed", it is not a mutually-exclusive classification. Languages may use both strategies, as is the case in English with the Latinate verbs such as "enter", "ascend" and "exit". The existence of equipollently-framed languages has been pointed out in which both manner and path are expressed in verbs (Slobin 2004), which could be true of Chinese, for instance.

Many Indigenous languages of the Americas, such as the extinct Atsugewi, do not select verbs of motion based on path or manner. Instead, verbs of motion are specific to the kind of object that is moving or being moved.

== Sources ==
- Croft, W. Croft Abstracts. Retrieved December 1, 2005 from the University of Manchester, Linguistics and English Language Web site: http://lings.ln.man.ac.uk/Info/staff/WAC/WACabst.html.
- Slobin, D. (2004). The many ways to search for a frog: linguistic typology & the expression of motion events. In S. Strömqvist & L. Verhoeven eds. Relating Events in Narrative. Vol 2, 219-257. Mahwah, NJ: LEA.
- Slobin D. (2005), Linguistic representations of motion events: What is signifier and what is signified?, in C. Maeder, O. Fischer, & W. Herlofsky (Eds.) (2005) Iconicity Inside Out: Iconicity in Language and Literature 4. Amsterdam/Philadelphia: John Benjamins.
- Talmy, L. (1991). Path to realization: A typology of event conflation. Berkeley Working Papers in Linguistics, 480-519.
- Talmy, L. (2000). Toward a cognitive semantics. Volume 1: Concept structuring systems. Volume 2: Typology and process in concept structuring. Cambridge, MA: MIT Press.
- Vinay, J.-P., Darbelnet J., 1958 (2004), Stylistique comparée du français et de l'anglais, Paris, Didier.
