= An Caighdeán Oifigiúil =

Written standard of Irish language

An Caighdeán Oifigiúil (pronounced [ənˠ ˌkəidʲaːn̪ˠ ˈɛfʲɪɟuːlʲ], lit. 'The Official Standard'), often shortened to An Caighdeán, is a written variety of the Irish language that is used as the standard or state norm for the spelling and the grammar of the language. It is used in official publications, and is the form taught in most schools in the Republic of Ireland. The standard is based on the three Gaeltacht dialects: Connacht Irish, Munster Irish and Ulster Irish. In Northern Ireland and County Donegal, the Ulster dialect, (Gaedhilg Uladh) is used extensively alongside the standard form in primary and secondary schools.

The Caighdeán Oifigiúil was first published in 1958 by combining spelling reforms—which were promulgated in 1945 to 1947—with grammar standards, which were published in 1953. Revised editions were published in 2012 and 2017. Since 2013, the Houses of the Oireachtas Commission, through the translation department, has been responsible for periodic updates to the standard, with reviews at least once every seven years.

== History ==
From the creation of the Irish Free State in December 1922, successive governments were committed to promoting the Irish language, with separate teaching materials in each of the three living vernacular dialects. Official publications were often issued with Irish translations, including the texts of all acts of the Oireachtas (parliament). The Oireachtas established Rannóg an Aistriúcháin (the Translation Branch) for this work, and that branch developed ad hoc conventions to reconcile the different dialect forms and to avoid favouring a single dialect in its output. When Taoiseach Éamon de Valera instigated a new constitution, which was adopted in 1937, he established a committee to propose spelling reforms for the "popular edition" of the Irish-language text. (Note: The "popular edition" is the one distributed to the public, as opposed to the formally "enrolled edition", which is a physical document used by the Supreme Court and uses the unreformed spellings.)

The committee was unable to agree, but one member, T. F. O'Rahilly, sent his notes to de Valera, who forwarded them to Rannóg an Aistriúcháin, which developed a system circulated within the civil service in 1945 and revised in 1947.

The first edition was reprinted regularly between 1960 and 2004; there were minor revisions in 1960 and 1979. A revised edition was published in 2012 both online and in hardcopy. Among the changes to be found in the revised version are, for example, various attempts to bring the recommendations of the Caighdeán closer to the spoken dialect of Gaeltacht speakers, including allowing further use of the nominative case where the genitive would historically have been found.

The context influencing the differences between dialects has changed over time. On one hand, the shrinking of the Irish-speaking areas over the past two centuries means that although there was once a continuum of dialects from one end of the country to the other, the dialects are now each geographically isolated. On the other hand, national TV and radio stations have increased certain types of mixing between the dialects in recent decades, reducing the differences.

== Characteristics ==
Its development had three purposes. One was to create a standard written form that would be mutually intelligible between speakers of the various dialects. Another was to simplify Irish spelling by removing many silent letters that had existed in Classical Irish. The last was to create a uniform and less complicated grammar, which should provide less of a hindrance to learners and thus combat the decline of the language.

The building blocks of the Caighdeán come from the three main dialects, namely Ulster Irish, Munster Irish, and Connacht Irish. The standard is described by Mícheál Ó Siadhail as being "to an extent based on a 'common core' of all Irish dialects, or the most frequent forms, and partly on random choice".

A side effect of simplifying the spelling was that the language's similarity to Scottish Gaelic was reduced. For example, while pre-Caighdeán Irish had separate spellings for the three words "bay" (bádh), "sympathy" (báidh), and "drowning" (bádhadh), the Caighdeán replaced all three with bá. The older forms resembled the Scottish Gaelic words bàgh, bàidh, and bàthadh.

=== Pronunciation and silent letters ===
The Caighdeán is a grammar and spelling guide, and makes no recommendations regarding pronunciation. However, the standardised orthography does aim to represent current pronunciation, and letters have been removed when they are no longer pronounced in any dialect. For example, beiriú replaced beirbhiughadh, and urú replaced urdhubhadh.

Though the standardising committee sought to eliminate silent letters, they also had a principle of retaining old forms if their spellings were reflected in any of the extant dialects. For example, if ⟨mh⟩ is silent in Ulster and Connacht, but pronounced in Munster, the ⟨mh⟩ ought to be kept. There are many examples of this principle being neglected. The standardised spelling of words such as "trá", "bá, or "pá", for example, might seem natural to a Connacht speaker; whereas the old spellings–"tráigh", "báigh", "páigh"–better reflect the Ulster and Munster pronunciations.

== Sources ==
- Litriú na Gaeilge – Lámhleabhar An Chaighdeáin Oifigiúil (in Irish). Dublin: Stationery Office / Oifig an tSoláthair. 1947.
- Gramadach na Gaeilge agus Litriú na Gaeilge – An Caighdeán Oifigiúil (in Irish). Dublin: Stationery Office / Oifig an tSoláthair. 1958.
- Nic Pháidín, Caoilfhionn (2008). "Corpus planning for Irish – dictionaries and terminology" (PDF). A New View of the Irish Language. Dublin: Cois Life. pp. 93–107. ISBN 978-1-901176-82-7.
- Ó Baoill, Dónall P. (1988). "Language planning in Ireland: the standardization of Irish". International Journal of the Sociology of Language. 1988 (70): 109–126. doi:10.1515/ijsl.1988.70.109. ISSN 0165-2516. S2CID 201713622.
- Ó Cearúil, Micheál; Ó Murchú, Máirtín (1999). "Script and Spelling". Bunreacht na hÉireann: a study of the Irish text (PDF). Dublin: Stationery Office. pp. 27–41. ISBN 0-7076-6400-4. Archived from the original (PDF) on 21 July 2011.
- Ó hIfearnáin, Tadhg (2009). "Irish-speaking society and the state" (PDF). In Ball, M; Müller, N (eds.). The Celtic Languages (2nd ed.). London: Routledge. pp. 539–586. ISBN 978-0415422796.
- Ó hIfearnáin, Tadhg; Ó Murchadha, Noel P (2011). "The Perception of Standard Irish as a Prestige Target Variety" (PDF). In Kristiansen, Tore; Coupland, Nikolas (eds.). Standard languages and language standards in a changing Europe. Standard Language Ideology in Contemporary Europe. Vol. 1. Oslo: Novus Press. pp. 97–104. ISBN 978-8270996599.
- Ó Siadhail, Mícheál (1981). "Standard Irish Orthography: An Assessment". The Crane Bag. 5 (2: Irish Language and Culture: An tEagrán Gaelach). Richard Kearney: 71–75. ISSN 0332-060X. JSTOR 30060637.
- Uíbh Eachach, Vivian, ed. (August 2012). Gramadach na Gaeilge: An Caighdeán Oifigiúil (PDF) (in Irish) (Caighdeán Athbhreithnithe ed.). Oireachtas. ISBN 9781406425765. Archived from the original (PDF) on 3 June 2013.
