= Cronaniv Burn =

Small river in County Donegal in Ulster, Ireland

- Etymology: Irish: Abhainn Chró Nimhe, meaning 'Poisoned Glen River'
- Native name: Abhainn Chró Nimhe (Irish)

Location
- Country: Ireland
- Province: Ulster
- County: County Donegal
- Barony: Kilmacrenan
- District: Gaoth Dobhair

Physical characteristics
- Source
  - location: Derryveagh Mountains
- Mouth
  - location: Devlin River, flowing into Dunlewey Lough
  - coordinates: 55°00′58″N 8°06′35″W

Basin features
- River system: Clady River (Irish: An Chláidigh), which flows into the Crolly River (Gweedore River) beside Bunbeg Quay

The Cronaniv Burn (Irish: Abhainn Chró Nimhe, meaning 'Poisoned Glen River'; the English name of the burn probably comes from the version Cró na Nimhe, meaning 'Hollow / Glen of the Poison') is a burn or small river that flows through the Poisoned Glen in Gaoth Dobhair, a district in the north-west of County Donegal in Ulster, the northern province in Ireland. In the Ulster Scots dialect, a 'burn' is a stream or small river.

== Course ==
The Cronaniv Burn is quite a short burn. It rises in the mountains at the southern end of the Poisoned Glen (Irish: Cró Nimhe), these mountains being part of the Derryveagh Mountains. It then flows in a north-westerly direction for its entire course. The burn flows through the Poisoned Glen, flowing along the middle of the glen's floor. It flows along the southern edge of Dunlewey (Irish: Dún Lúiche), a village at the foot of Errigal (Irish: An Earagail). The burn then flows into the Devlin River (Irish: Abhainn Dhuibhlinne), joining that river very near its mouth, on the southern edge of Dunlewey. The Devlin River then flows on for a few hundred yards, flowing into Dunlewey Lough (Irish: Loch Dhún Lúiche), the river emptying into the south-eastern end of the lough.

Near the mouth of the Cronaniv Burn, beside where the burn meets the Devlin River, sits the ruins of Dunlewey Church of Ireland Church. This former church, located on the southern outskirts of Dunlewey, was built in the neo-Gothic style in the early 1850s. The building was formerly a 'chapel of ease' for the Church of Ireland Parish of Tullaghobegley. The church was finally closed in 1955, when its roof was removed, and has been derelict ever since.
