= R251 road (Ireland) =

Road in Ireland

R251 road
- Bóthar R251
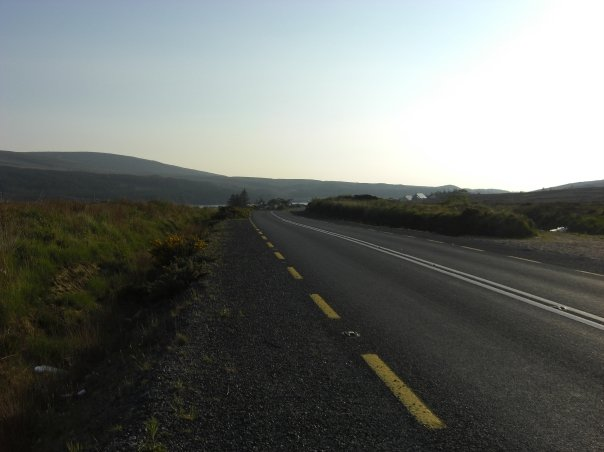

Major junctions
- From: R250 at Doon Glebe, County Donegal
- To: N56 at Caoldroim Uachtarach

Location
- Country: Ireland

Highway system
- Roads in Ireland; Motorways; Primary; Secondary; Regional
← R250	→ R252

The R251 road is a regional road in Ireland. It is located entirely in County Donegal and runs in a northerly then westerly direction from its junction with the R250 road west of Letterkenny to the N56 east of Gweedore. The route is very scenic: it passes Glenveagh, skirts around the base of Errigal and offers excellent views of the Derryveagh Mountains.

== See also ==
- Roads in Ireland
- Motorways in Ireland
- National primary road
- National secondary road
