= Dunlewey Lough =

Lake in County Donegal, Ireland

- Loch Dhún Lúiche (Irish)
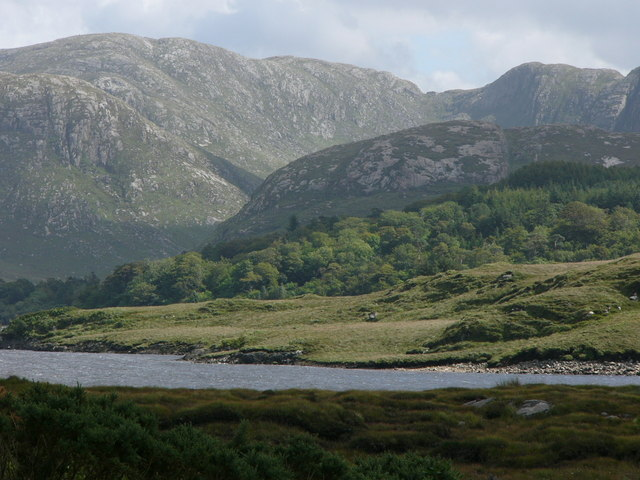
- View from lake north shore

- Location in Ireland
- Location: Dunlewey, County Donegal
- Coordinates: 55.0227°N 8.1321°W
- Primary outflows: Clady River (Irish: An Chláidigh)
- Catchment area: 35.96 km^{2} (13.88 sq mi)
- Basin countries: Ireland
- Surface area: 1.1 km^{2} (0.42 sq mi)
- Surface elevation: 61 m (200 ft)
- Islands: Oilean Gráinne

Dunlewey Lough, or Dunlewy Lough (Irish: Loch Dhún Lúiche), is a lake in County Donegal, Ireland. It lies at the foot of Errigal and beside the village of Dunlewey (or Dunlewy). It is separated from the larger Lough Nacung Upper, to the west, by a narrow strip of land. The Cronaniv Burn, which flows through the Poisoned Glen, flows into the Devlin River very near where that river flows into Dunlewey Lough. The Devlin River flows into the south-eastern end of the lough, on the southern edge of Dunlewey village.

There are the remains of a crannóg (a fortified lake dwelling) on the lake. This may be the source of the name Dún Lúiche, which means "Lugh's fort". There is a modern wooden sculpture of Lugh, an ancient Irish god, on the lakeshore.

On the lakeshore there is also tourist centre, called the Lakeside Centre or Ionad Cois Locha, which offers boat trips of the lake, and where they tell folk tales of a witch that is said to have lived in the big house in the forest across the lake.

== See also ==
- List of loughs in Ireland
- Poisoned Glen
