= Breac House =

General information
- Location: County Donegal, Ireland
- Coordinates: 55.19341°N 7.98561°W
- Opened: 2017

Design and construction
- Architect: MacGabhann

Website
- breac.house

Breac House is a boutique hotel in County Donegal, Ireland.

The hotel is on Horn Head peninsula near Dunfanaghy and overlooks Killahoey Strand, Sheephaven Bay, and Muckish Mountain. It opened in 2017.

== Property ==
The hotel has four guest rooms; three were part of the original design and a fourth was added during the COVID-19 shutdowns. Owners Cathrine Burke and Niall Campbell live onsite.

Designed by Letterkenny architecture firm MacGabhann to recall a traditional longhouse, the house was designed to blend with its surroundings. The grounds include a traditional Irish sweathouse with a grass roof.

In April of 2023 the hotel was included in the Irish Sunday Times' list of ten great hotels of Ireland and the Evening Standard named it to their list of the world's most sustainable hotels.
