= Earagail Arts Festival =

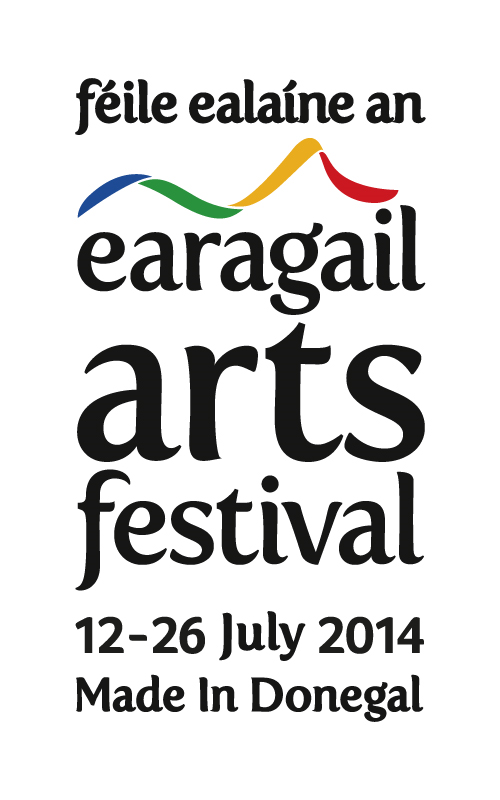
- Earagail Arts Festival logo
- Genre: Arts
- Dates: June/July
- Locations: County Donegal, Ireland
- Years active: 1988 - present
- Website: www.eaf.ie

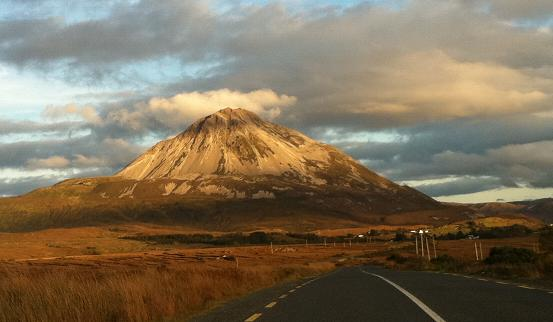
The festival is named after the Errigal mountain.

The Earagail Arts Festival (Irish: Féile Ealaíne na hEaragaile) is an annual festival which takes place in County Donegal, Ireland, every June or July. The festival began in June 1988.

The Festival includes parades, street performances and numerous plays, musical concerts and comedy acts in towns and villages across County Donegal. Letterkenny is at the centre of the festival with various venues such as An Grianán Theatre, Letterkenny Regional Cultural Centre and Donegal County Museum in the town hosting events. Many events take place in other towns and villages throughout Donegal, including Ballybofey, Gweedore, Inishowen, Falcarragh and Creeslough.

It also runs events in tourist attractions around Donegal itself. Drive-in movies at Downings Beach and at Ards Forest Park have been sell-outs in past years and the natural landscape of Glenveagh, Errigal, the Muckish and Aghla mountains, Tory Island and Magheraroarty Beach all form regular backdrops to the festival programme.

== Festivals ==
=== Acts ===
The line-up for the 2001 festival included The Undertones, Richard Thompson, John Herald, Johnny Vegas, Phil Kay, Louis de Paor, The Wrigley Sisters, Dan Crary and Beppe Gambetta.

The line-up for the 2002 festival included Mory Kanté, Lambchop, Gail Davies, Hazel O'Connor and Adam Hills.

The line-up for the 2003 festival included Roy Hargrove, Mickey Harte, The Revs, Cathal Ó Searcaigh and Henry McCullough.

The line-up for the 2004 festival included David Strassman, Bob Geldof and Andy Irvine.

The line-up for the 2005 festival included The Saw Doctors, Kathryn Williams, Richie Havens and Pierce Turner.

The line-up for the 2006 festival included John Nee, Joanna MacGregor, Eddi Reader, Ukulele Orchestra of Great Britain and Kíla.

The line-up for the 2007 festival included The Skatalites, Patrick Street, Seth Lakeman, Declan O'Rourke and the RTÉ Vanbrugh Quartet.

The 2008 festival was officially launched at the Grill Music Venue. The line-up for the festival included Dave Geraghty, Altan, Donal Lunny, Liam Ó Maonlaí and Lisa Hannigan.

The 2009 Festival was launched in The Ramada Encore Hotel (now The Station House Hotel) on the Oldtown Road in Letterkenny. Launched on 2 June, it ran from 4 to 19 July. Highlights included The Festival Carnival Parade and Village Fete in Letterkenny on 12 July, Quarterdeck, The Stunning, Mary Black, The Henry Girls, Bassekou Kouate and The Hot 8 Brass Band.

The line-up for 2010's festival included Diving Comedy, Duke Special, The Villagers, Jerry Fish and The Pyros.

The 2012 festival featured We Cut Corners, LUXe, Love All, Dave Alvin and Bui Bolg.

The 2013 festival was the Earagail Arts Festival's 25th birthday. It included Josh Ritter, Backyard Devils, Clannad, Altan, Fidil, The Henry Girls & An Cosan Glas, Out to Lunch, In Their Thousands and LUXe.

The 2014 festival will feature Sharon Shannon, Frances Black and Mary Coughlan, Bombino, Eduardo Niebla, Melting Pod, Fishamble, LUXe, North West Opera, IMRAM, Dante or Die, and many other performances, exhibitions, workshops and drive-in films.

=== Funding ===
In 2011, the Arts Festival was principally funded by The Arts Council, Donegal County Council and Fáilte Ireland. Additional funders included British Council Ireland, Office of Public Works, Údarás na Gaeltachta, Donegal Local Development, Department of community, Equality and Gaeltacht Affairs, European Union, Ealaín na Gaeltachta Teoranta, Leader +, Donegal County Council Public Art Programme and Letterkenny Town Council. The 2011 festival was also supported by sponsors.
