= R257 road (Ireland) =

Regional road in Ireland

Coordinates: 55.062207°N 8.300626°W

R257 road
- Bóthar R257
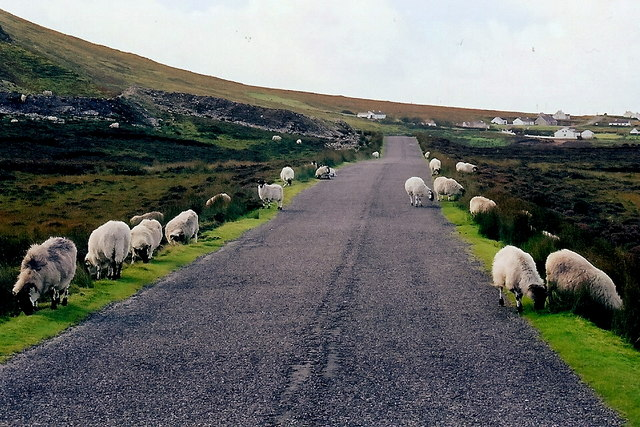
- Sheep grazing by the R257 in Meenaclady

Route information
- Length: 25.8 km (16.0 mi)

Major junctions
- From: N56 Gort a' Choirce
- Crosses Owentully River, Owenwillin River, Yellow River, Glen River, Owencronahulla River and Clady River; Passes through Derrybeg; Crosses Catheen River; R258 Bunbeg
- To: N56 Dore (north of Crolly)

Location
- Country: Ireland

Highway system
- Roads in Ireland; Motorways; Primary; Secondary; Regional

The R257 road is a regional road in Ireland, located in County Donegal. It is a scenic route, skirting around the edge of the Bloody Foreland.
