= John Nee =

Irish actor (born 1959)

Little John Nee
- Little John Nee on stage in Letterkenny
- Born: Glasgow, Scotland
- Occupation: Writer/Performer/Musician
- Years active: 1976–present

John Nee (born 1959; Irish: Seán Ó Nia), more commonly known by his stage name Little John Nee, is an Irish storyteller, writer, performer and musician based in Galway on Ireland's West Coast. Nee was born in Glasgow in 1959. He returned to Letterkenny, in County Donegal, with his family when he was twelve. It was here that he began performing in punk bands, such as Joe Petrol and the Petrol Bombs and Hemlock. He lived in London during the late seventies where he continued to perform, taking inspiration from the growing punk movement. Nee returned to Ireland in 1982, and since then has employed a variety of media, including street performance, theatre, radio, poetry, music, live-streaming and installation art, to pioneer his own unique style of storytelling. He is the author of a book of haikus "The Apocalypse Came on a Friday", as well as numerous one-man shows, including "The Derry Boat" (1998), "Limavady My Heart’s Delight" (2006), "Dead Rooster Blues" (2008) and "Radio Rosario" (2017). In 2016 Nee was elected a member of Aosdána. He works both as a solo artist and collaboratively.

== Early life ==
Nee's family are from Oldtown, Letterkenny, County Donegal. His mother, Mary (died 8 August 2004), was from Corravaddy and his father, Dick (died 9 August 2009), was from Cullion. He had two brothers, Charlie and Jim, both of whom are dead, and two sisters Susan (Oldtown resident) and Anna (Glasgow resident).

Born in Glasgow, Nee spent childhood summers in Letterkenny before the family returned to his parents' home in Oldtown Letterkenny to live, shortly after Nee turned twelve. He was educated at St Eunan's College in the town until he was expelled. While in his first year at the school, he and Hugo Devlin formed a band, Stable Rock. The English glam rock band Slade had formed in 1966 and spent time being known as Ambrose Slade before dropping the "Ambrose" part in 1969. Nee, Devlin and their band (which featured Shaun Deehan and Martin McDaid) then decided to call themselves Ambrose. McDaid entered them into a competition at St Conal's Hospital, with their name being taken as "Ambro"; they finished in second position. Nee was also a member of the band Hemlock along with fellow St Eunan's students, the Macklin brothers (Colm and Padraig), Brian O'Shea and George Cullen. During summers Nee toured the dancehalls of Donegal with Hemlock, supporting the likes of Philomena Begley and her Ramblin’ Men

== Career ==
=== Early career ===
Nee moved to London in 1977 where he worked on building sites, while living in squats in Islington and Stoke Newington. It was during this period that he developed one of his first performance personas, the punk beat poet, The Zen Mc Gonagal, performing guest spots at the Dalston Junction Alternative Cabaret. Nee returned to Dublin in 1982 where he continued performing The Zen Mc Gonagal as a street performer on Dublin's Grafton Street. This evolved into a performance as Charlie Chaplin, Nee becoming one of Grafton Street's most iconic characters during the mid-eighties. Four years later Nee relocated to Barna in Galway where he joined Macnas, the well-known street performance group, and began performing with Anet Moore as the Barna Boot Co. Nee also worked with the Grapevine Arts Touring Co. and the Pooka Children's Theatre, writing a series of children's plays in the early nineties such as The Ballygroovy Ave.

=== Stage ===
Nee was given his stage name by his father who was a Little Richard fan. He founded the first punk band in County Donegal in 1976. They were known as Joe Petrol and the Petrol Bombs. He also spent some time as a labourer on the building sites in London where he began performing at Dalston Junction Alternative Cabaret at The Crown&Castle.

Nee later moved to Dublin and began performing Charlie Chaplin on Grafton Street. He was involved in performances with the Grapevine Touring Theatre. He then became a member of Galway's newly formed Macnas. In 1986 he took up position in a caravan in Barna.

His first one-man show, The Derry Boat, was about migrant labourers and had him perform as multiple characters. The Earagail Arts Festival commissioned this in 1988. Nee was nominated for the Helen Hayes Award for his performance in The Derry Boat. During the early-1990s, Nee did work in children's theatre (writing directing and performing).

Galway Arts Festival performances include The Ballad of Jah Kettle (2000), Donde Esta Jesus Fahy (2001) and Country and Irish (2002). The Scottish Touring Theatre Consortium and Cumbernauld Theatre commissioned Salt O The Earth in 2003. Earagail Arts Festival commissioned Rural Electric in 2004. Axis Theatre Ballymun commissioned The Mental in 2005; this featured a character called Joe Boyle who ended up in St Conal's Hospital and referenced Seosamh Mac Grianna who spent three decades there. In 2005, Nee also toured with Star of Stage, Screen, and Street Corners. In August 2007, Nee announced his obsession with the ukulele while on RTÉ Radio 1 presenter Dave Fanning's show, Drivetime with Dave. He played a tune which he recorded with his band while in Letterkenny. In 2010, in a Barabbas Theatre Company production called "The Singing Irish Clown", Nee portrayed Johnny Patterson, the 19th-century clown discovered by Pablo Fanque, the British circus proprietor referenced in The Beatles song "Being for the Benefit of Mr. Kite!"

His 2020 Tilt of the Sky tour was disrupted by the COVID-19 pandemic; instead of performing at the Earagail Arts Festival, he did a mini-tour of County Donegal, performing outside An Grianán Theatre, as well as in Ramelton, Rathmullan, Raphoe, Dunfanaghy, Gortahork, Malin and Culdaff.

=== Screen ===
Nee has made appearances in films such as the Neil Jordan-directed 1988 fantasy comedy film High Spirits. He played the part of Toupee Man in the 2000 Barry Levinson-directed comedy film An Everlasting Piece.

In the mid-2000s, Nee played the silent comedy character of Postie in TG4 television series Fear an Phoist.

== Personal life ==
Nee lives in County Galway. He first settled in Galway (the city) in 1986 but then moved to Tuam in 2006.
