= Dunlewey =

Gaeltacht village in County Donegal, Ireland

Coordinates: 55.0194°N 8.1118°W

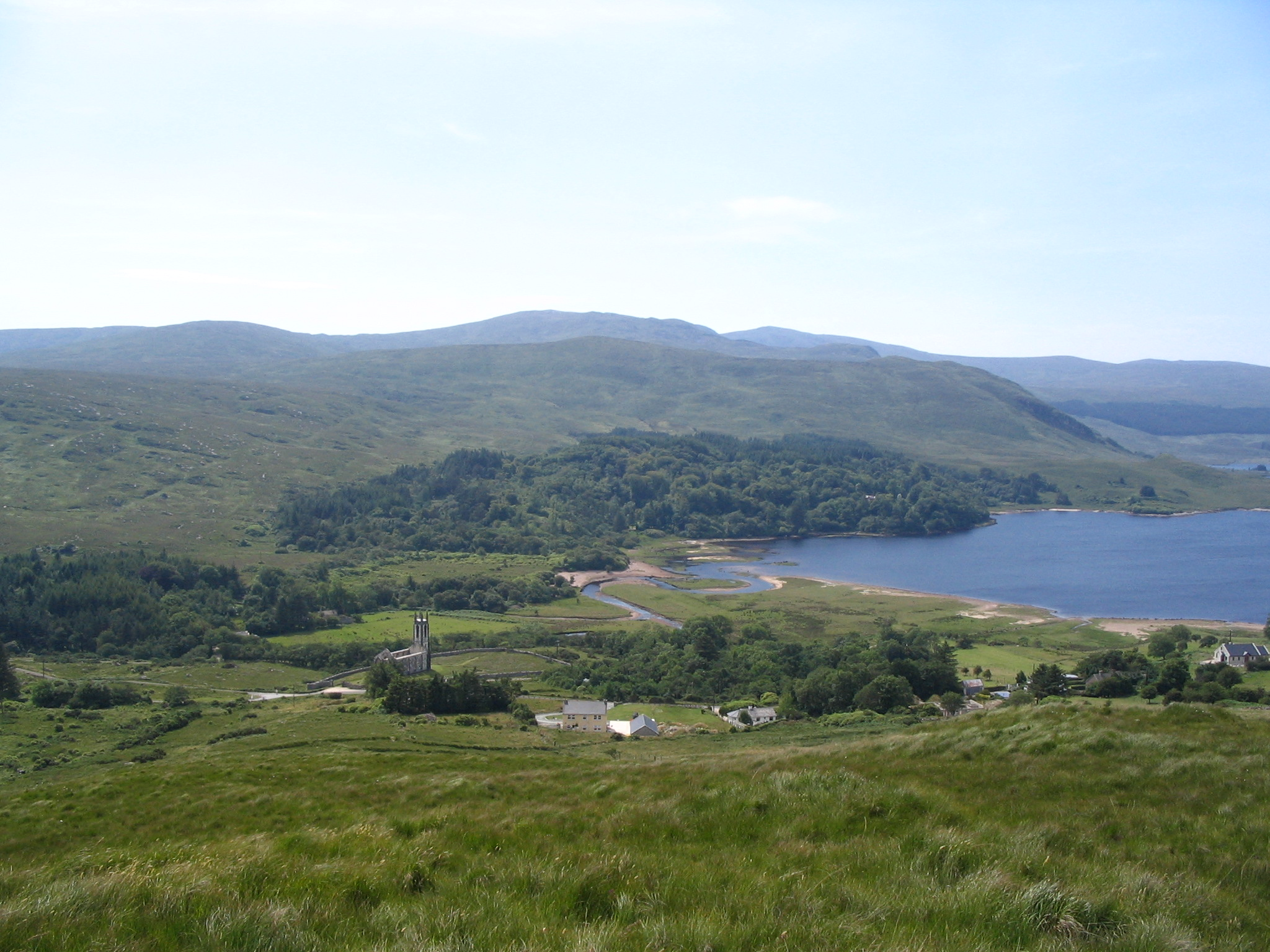
The lough and ruined church

Dún Lúiche, known in English as Dunlewey or Dunlewy, is a small Gaeltacht village in the Gweedore district in the north-west of County Donegal in Ulster, the northern province in Ireland. The village sits in the Poisoned Glen, at the foot of Errigal and on the shore of Dunlewey Lough. The Cronaniv Burn flows along the southern edge of the village. Dunlewey has a tourist centre, called the Lakeside Centre or Ionad Cois Locha, which offers boat trips of the lake. To the west of the lake is a ruined church.

The Irish language name Dún Lúiche means "fort of Lugh", an ancient Irish god. Near the Lakeside Centre is a modern wooden sculpture of the god. Folklore says that the Poisoned Glen is where Lugh slew Balor, and that it is so named because poison seeped from Balor's 'evil eye'.

Dunlewey is the home of the Dunlewey Connemara ponies.
