= Aghla Beg =

Mountain in Ireland

- Eachla Beag
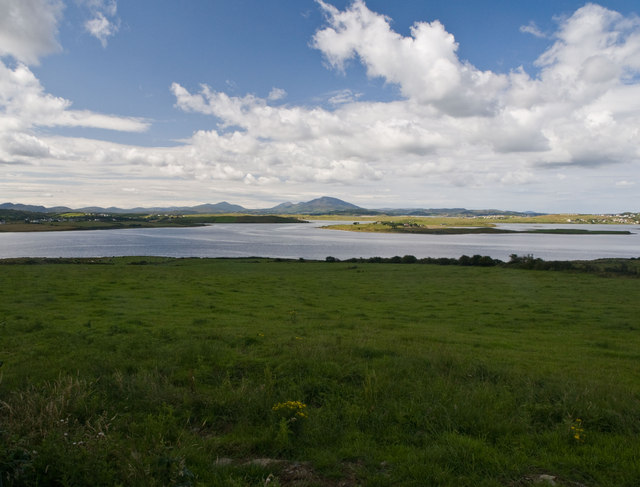
- View across Mulroy Bay towards Aghla Beg and Muckish

Highest point
- Elevation: 603 m (1,978 ft)
- Listing: Marilyn
- Coordinates: 55°04′07″N 8°03′20″W

Naming
- English translation: small look-out
- Language of name: Irish

Geography
- Location within Ireland
- Location: County Donegal, Ireland
- Parent range: Seven Sisters
- OSI/OSNI grid: B965246
- Topo map: OSi Discovery 2

Aghla Beg (Irish: Eachla Beag) is a mountain in County Donegal, Ireland. Of its two summits, one has a height of 564 metres (1,850 ft), and the other, Aghla Beg South Top 602 metres (1,975 ft).

== Geography ==
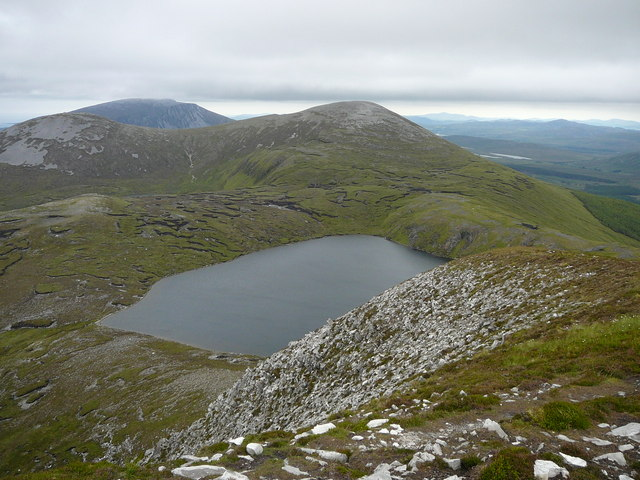
View from Aghla More across Lough Feeane towards the two summits of Aghla Beg. Behind them, Muckish is visible.

The mountain is the third-most northern and fifth-highest of the mountain chain, called the Seven Sisters by locals: Muckish, Crocknalaragagh, Aghla Beg, Ardloughnabrackbaddy, Aghla More, Mackoght (also known as 'little Errigal') and Errigal. The Seven Sisters are part of the Derryveagh Mountains.
