= R253 road (Ireland) =

Road in Ireland

Coordinates: 54.814795°N 7.896134°W

R253 road
- Bóthar R253
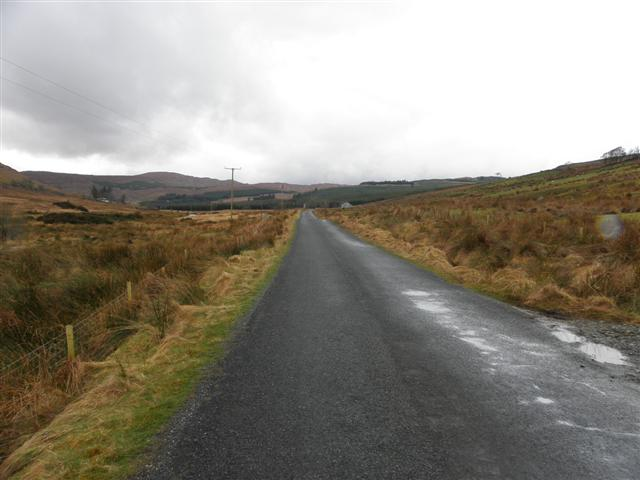
- R253 at Altatraght

Route information
- Length: 29.5 km (18.3 mi)

Major junctions
- From: N56 Glenties
- To: R252 Aghaveagh

Location
- Country: Ireland

Highway system
- Roads in Ireland; Motorways; Primary; Secondary; Regional

The R253 road is a regional road in Ireland, located in County Donegal.
