= Seven Sisters, Donegal =

Mountain chain in County Donegal, Ireland

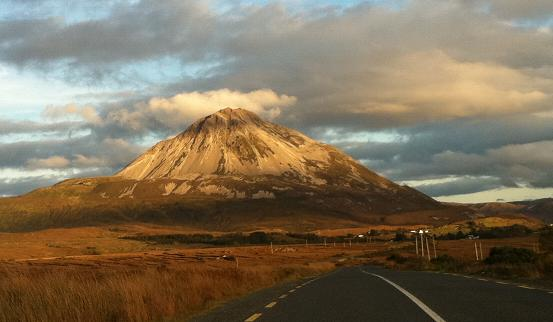
Errigal, at 751 m, is the tallest peak in County Donegal

The Seven Sisters (Irish: Na Seacht Deirfiúracha) is a mountain chain in northwest County Donegal, Ireland. It is part of a larger mountain range called the Derryveagh Mountains. The Seven Sisters, from southwest to northeast, are as follows:

- Errigal (751 m)
- Mackoght a.k.a. Wee Errigal (555 m)
- Aghla More (581 m)
- Ardloughnabrackbaddy (473 m)
- Aghla Beg (603 m)
- Crocknalaragagh (471 m)
- Muckish (666 m)
