= Clondahorky =

Civil parish in County Donegal, Ireland

Clondahorky (Irish: Cluain Dá Chorcach) is a parish in County Donegal, Ireland. It is in the Diocese of Raphoe. It is also a civil parish in the barony of Kilmacrenan. Dunfanaghy is the principal town.
