= R250 road (Ireland) =

Road in Ireland

Coordinates: 54.896837°N 8.046933°W

R250 road
- Bóthar R250
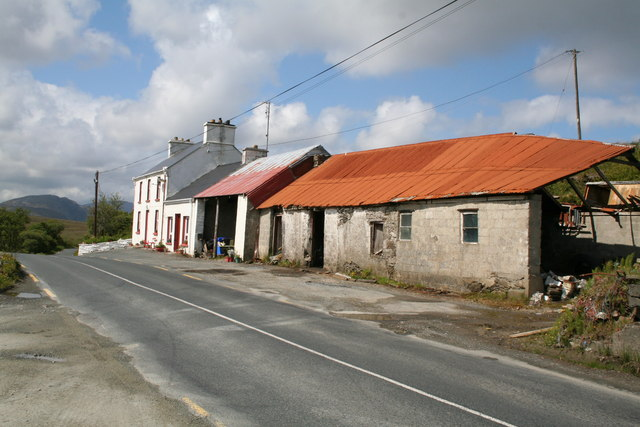
- Roadside house and outbuildings on R250

Route information
- Length: 28.2 km (17.5 mi)

Major junctions
- From: N56 Glenties
- R252 Fintown; Crosses River Finn and Cummirk River; R251 Doon Glebe
- To: N14 / N56 Letterkenny (Port Bridge Roundabout)

Location
- Country: Ireland

Highway system
- Roads in Ireland; Motorways; Primary; Secondary; Regional

The R250 road is a regional road in Ireland, located in County Donegal.

R250 runs northeast from Glenties to Letterkenny, and is almost entirely rural in character, save for the short distance within Letterkenny itself.

== Gallery ==
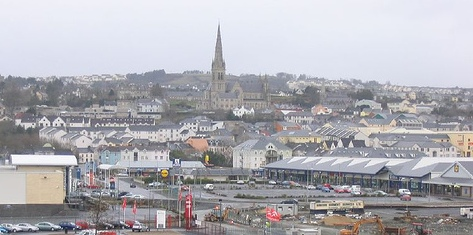
Letterkenny, at the northeastern end of R250

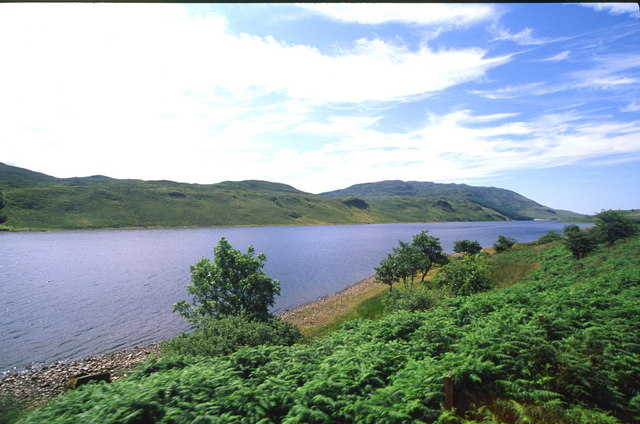
The road heads through Fintown

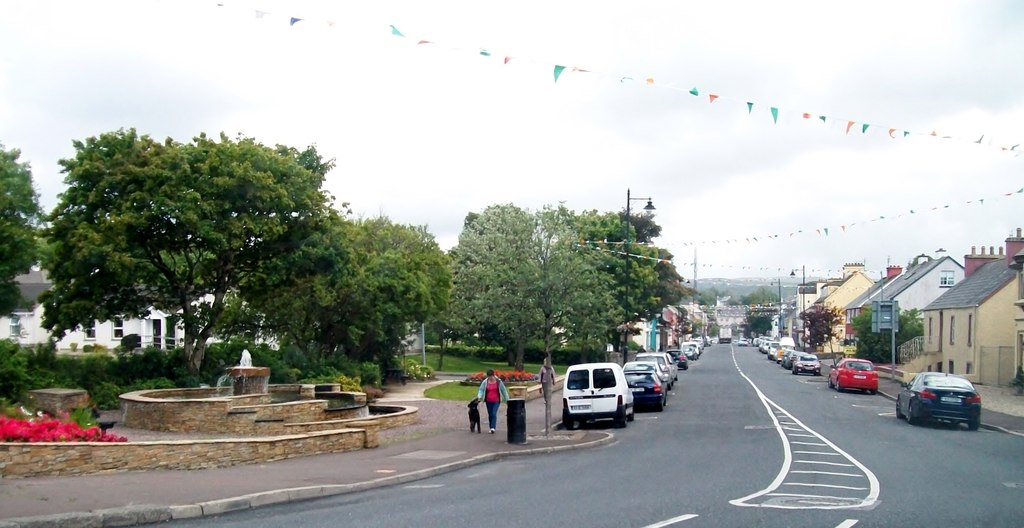
At the end of R250, looking on into Glenties
