= Lough Nacung Upper =

Lake in County Donegal, Ireland

- Loch na Cuinge Uachtarach (Irish)
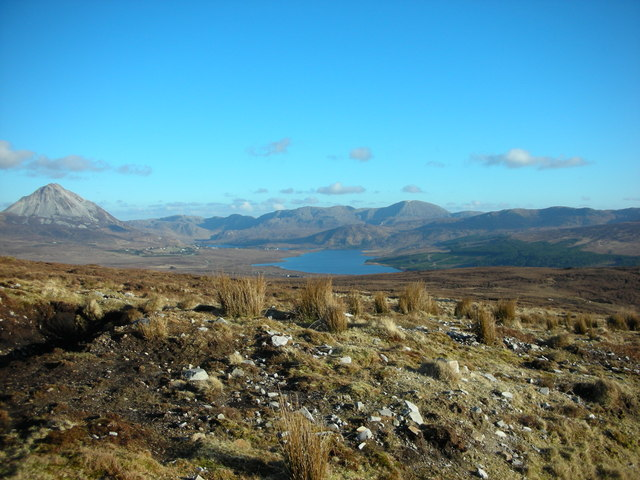
- View towards Lough Nacung Upper, with Errigal to the left.

- Location in Ireland
- Location: County Donegal
- Coordinates: 55.032°N 8.166°W
- Lake type: natural freshwater lake
- Primary inflows: Lough Dunlewey
- Primary outflows: Lough Nacung Lower, to the Clady River
- Catchment area: 78.62 km^{2} (30.36 sq mi)
- Basin countries: Ireland
- Max. length: 2.72 miles (4.38 km)
- Max. width: 0.38 miles (0.61 km)
- Surface area: 2.08 km^{2} (0.80 sq mi)
- Surface elevation: 59 m (194 ft)

Lough Nacung Upper (Irish: Loch na Cuinge Uachtarach, meaning 'upper narrowness lake' or 'upper lake of the isthmus'), also known as Upper Lough Nacung, is a lake in Gweedore, a district in the north-west of County Donegal, Ireland. It connects Lough Dunlewey to Lough Nacung Lower, which drains into the Clady River. Lough Nacung is a Special Area of Conservation.

The name is derived from the Irish cuing, meaning "lake of the isthmus" or "narrow neck of land (as between two lakes)".

== Wildlife ==
The main fish species are sea trout and salmon.

== See also ==
- List of loughs in Ireland
- List of Special Areas of Conservation in the Republic of Ireland
