= Crocknalaragagh =

Mountain in County Donegal, Ireland

- Location within island of Ireland

Highest point
- Elevation: 471 m (1,545 ft)
- Listing: Marilyn
- Coordinates: 55°05′N 8°02′W

Naming
- Native name: Cnoc na Láragacha

Geography
- Location: County Donegal, Ireland
- Parent range: Derryveagh Mountains
- OSI/OSNI grid: B984261

Crocknalaragagh is a mountain in County Donegal, Ireland, with a height of 471 m.

== Geography ==
It is the second-most northern and the lowest of the mountain range locally called the Seven Sisters which also includes Muckish, Aghla Beg, Ardloughnabrackbaddy, Aghla More, Mackoght (also known as 'Little Errigal') and Errigal. All of the Seven Sisters are part of the Derryveagh Mountains.
