= Ardloughnabrackbaddy =

Mountain in County Donegal, Ireland

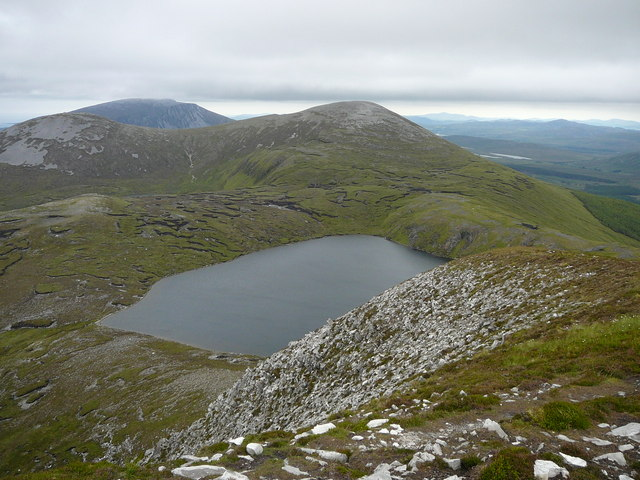
- Ardloughnabrackbaddy is the hill just to the left of the lake. The two summits in the distance are those of Aghla Beg, between them, Muckish is visible.

Highest point
- Elevation: 472.5 m (1,550 ft)
- Listing: Mountains of Ireland
- Coordinates: 55.0679°N 8.0713°W

Naming
- Native name: Ard Loch na mBreac Beadaí

Geography
- Location within Ireland
- Location: County Donegal, Ireland
- Parent range: Seven Sisters

Ardloughnabrackbaddy (Irish: Ard Loch na mBreac Beadaí, meaning 'high lough of the dainty/saucy trout' ) is a mountain in County Donegal, Ireland, with a height of 472.5 m (1,550 ft).

== Geography ==
It sits above Loughnabrackbaddy lake and is the middle summit and third highest of the "Seven Sisters". The Seven Sisters are part of the Derryveagh range and includes Muckish, Crocknalaragagh, Aghla Beg, Ardloughnabrackbaddy, Aghla More, Mackoght and Errigal.
