= Portnablagh =

Village in County Donegal, Ireland

Portnablagh Port na Bláiche
- Village
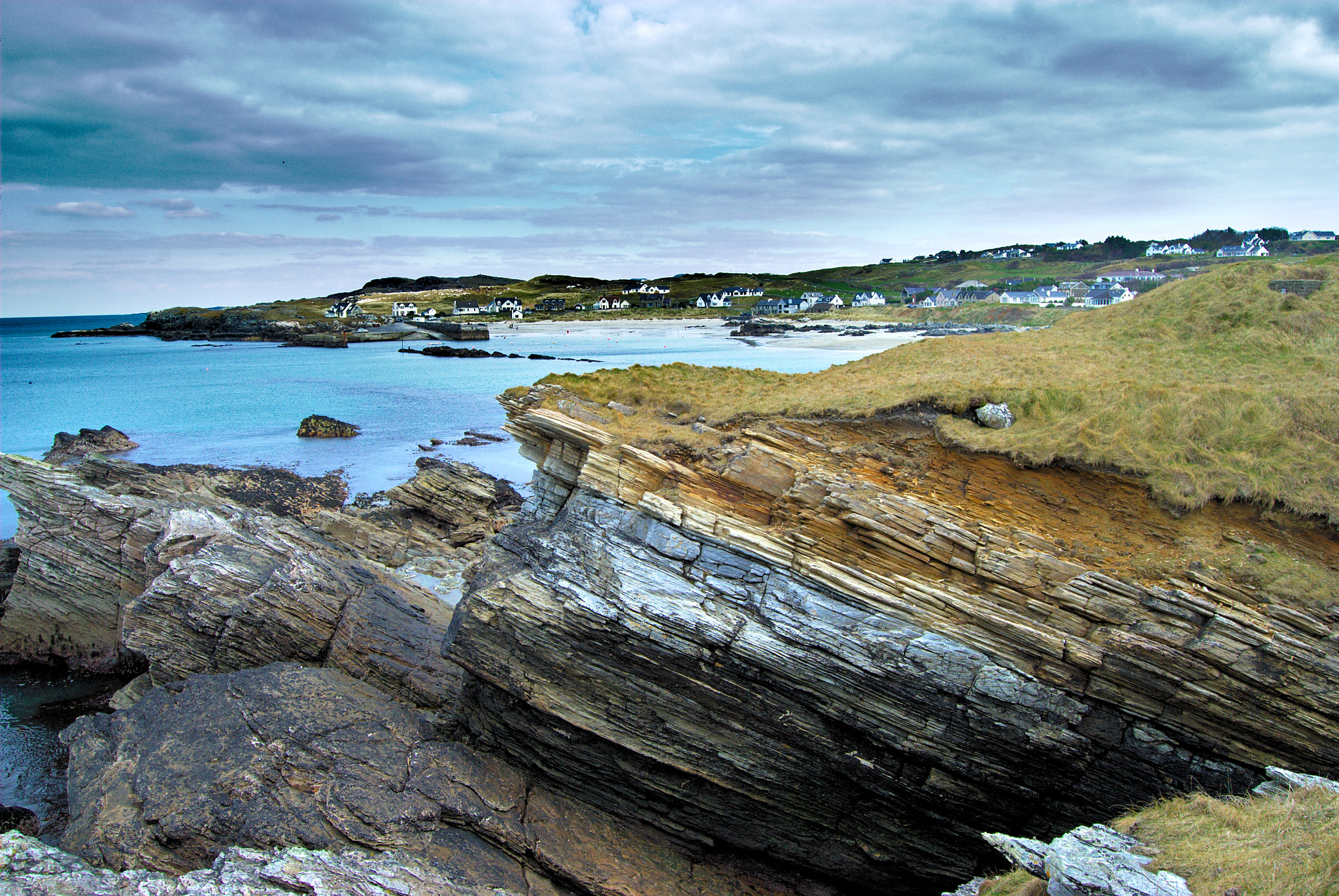
- The harbour in Portnablagh

- Location in Ireland
- Coordinates: 55°10′41″N 7°55′57″W
- Country: Ireland
- Province: Ulster
- County: County Donegal
- Barony: Kilmacrenan
- Time zone: UTC+0 (WET)
  - Summer (DST): UTC-1 (IST (WEST))
- Irish Grid Reference: C055307

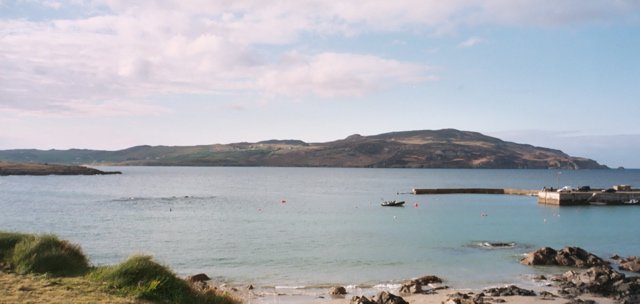
View across Sheephaven Bay from Portnablagh, with Horn Head in the background

Portnablagh (Irish: Port na Bláiche, meaning, depending on translation, either 'Port of the Flowers' or 'Harbour of the Buttermilk', possibly from the rough seas in the area) is a small village in County Donegal in Ulster, the northern province in Ireland. Portnablagh (also written in English as Port-na-Blagh) is located on the northwest coast of County Donegal, specifically the west side of Sheephaven Bay. It is on the N56 road.

Portnablagh, along with neighbouring Dunfanaghy, is known for its beaches and harbour. It attracts large numbers of tourists, mostly from the rest of Ulster, every summer.

The small harbour is protected on 3 sides and has a relatively short slipway, which is used by fishing and pleasure boat owners, particularly during the summer months. It provides access for boat owners to beaches in Sheephaven Bay, many of which are only accessible on foot or by sea.

== Faugher House ==
On the south-eastern edge of Portnablagh, between Ards Forest Park and Portnablagh itself, lie the ruins of Faugher House, also known as O'Boyle's Castle or Wray's Castle. This small fortified house and its surrounding bawn, located in the townland of Faugher, were built during the Plantation of Ulster, and may have been built in stages throughout the seventeenth century. The original 'castle' or fortified house on this site was probably built for Toirdhealbhach Ruadh Ó Baoighill (sometimes anglicised as Turlough Roe O'Boyle or Tirlagh Roe O'Boyle) about 1611, shortly after he was granted land in the vicinity during the Plantation of Ulster. Ó Baoighill and his family were originally from Kiltooris Castle, near both Portnoo and Narin in the south-west of County Donegal. The surviving bawn on the site probably dates from this time, very early in the Plantation of Ulster.

However, the surviving 'Plantation-era' fortified house (now ruined) may have been built in the second half of the seventeenth century, possibly for the Wray family. The building was probably abandoned by the mid-eighteenth century. The rather 'Scottish-style' ruin is beside 'the Middle Road', a sideroad leading to Breaghy Head, just off the N56, the main Letterkenny to Dunfanaghy road. The site is privately owned and is not open to the public.

== See also ==
- List of towns and villages in the Republic of Ireland
