= Aghla More =

Mountain in County Donegal, Ireland

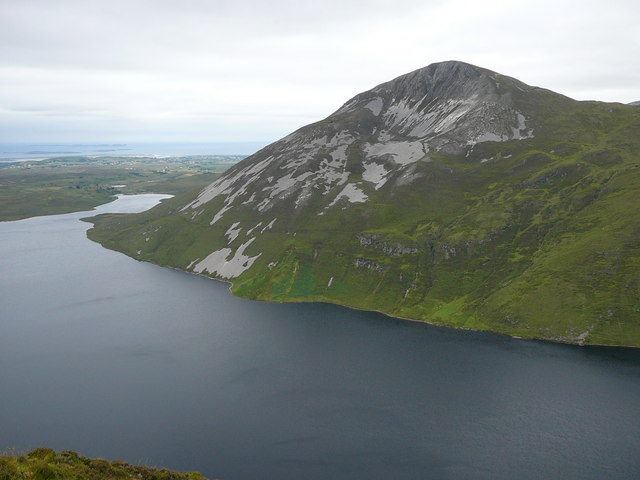

Highest point
- Elevation: 581.2 m (1,907 ft)
- Listing: Mountains of Ireland
- Coordinates: 55°04′N 8°05′W

Naming
- Native name: An Eachla Mhór

Geography
- Location within Ireland
- Location: County Donegal, Ireland
- Parent range: Seven Sisters

Aghla More (Irish: An Eachla Mhór) is a mountain in County Donegal, Ireland with a height of 581 m (1,906 ft).

== Geography ==
The mountain is the third most southern and fourth highest of the mountain chain, called the "Seven Sisters" by locals (Muckish, Crocknalaragagh, Aghla Beg, Ardloughnabrackbaddy, Aghla More, Mackoght (also known as "little Errigal") and Errigal. The Seven Sisters are part of the Derryveagh Mountain range.
