= Ards Forest Park =

Nature reserve in County Donegal, Ireland

Coordinates: 55.15314°N 7.90587°W

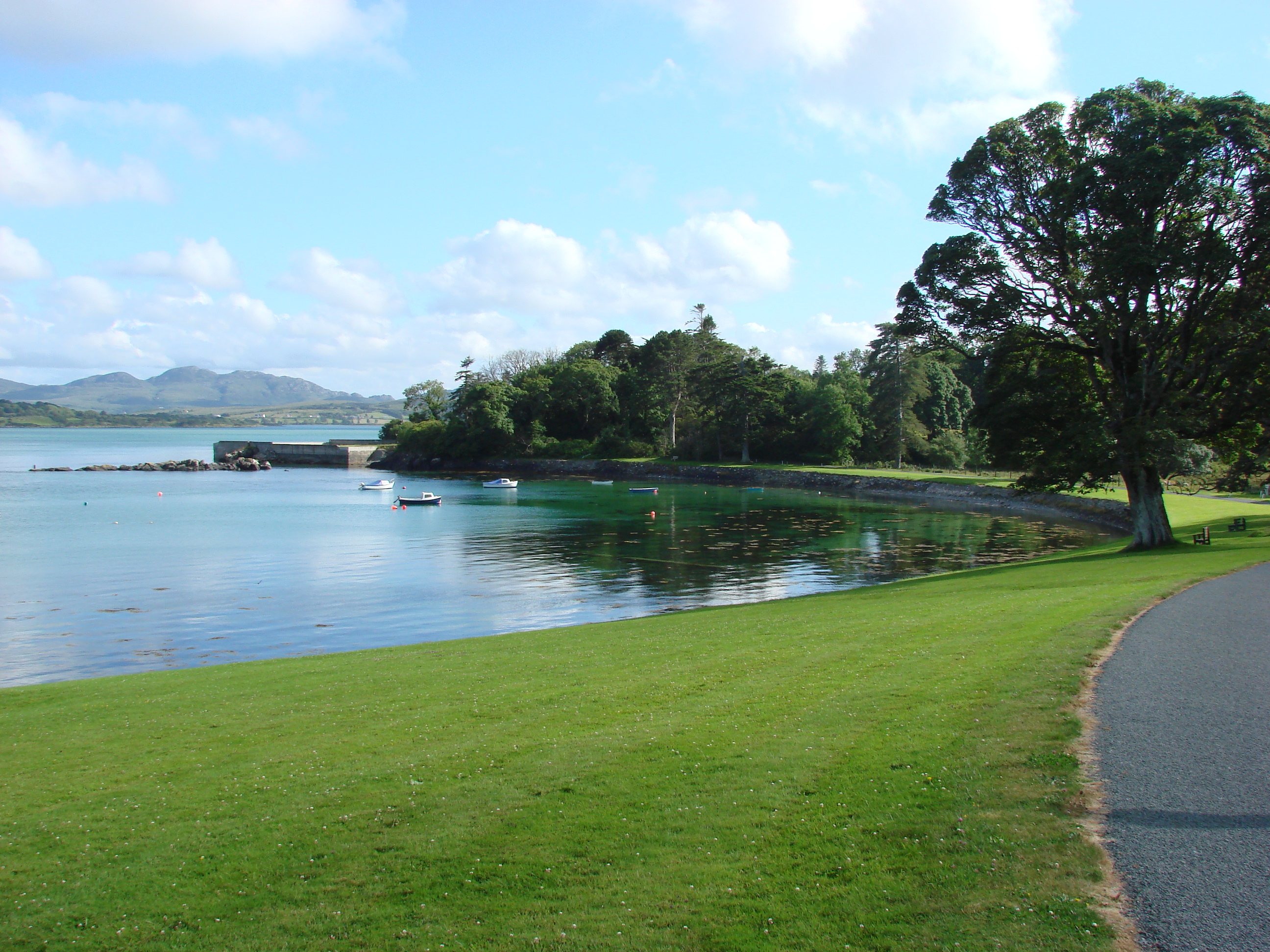
Ards Forest Park

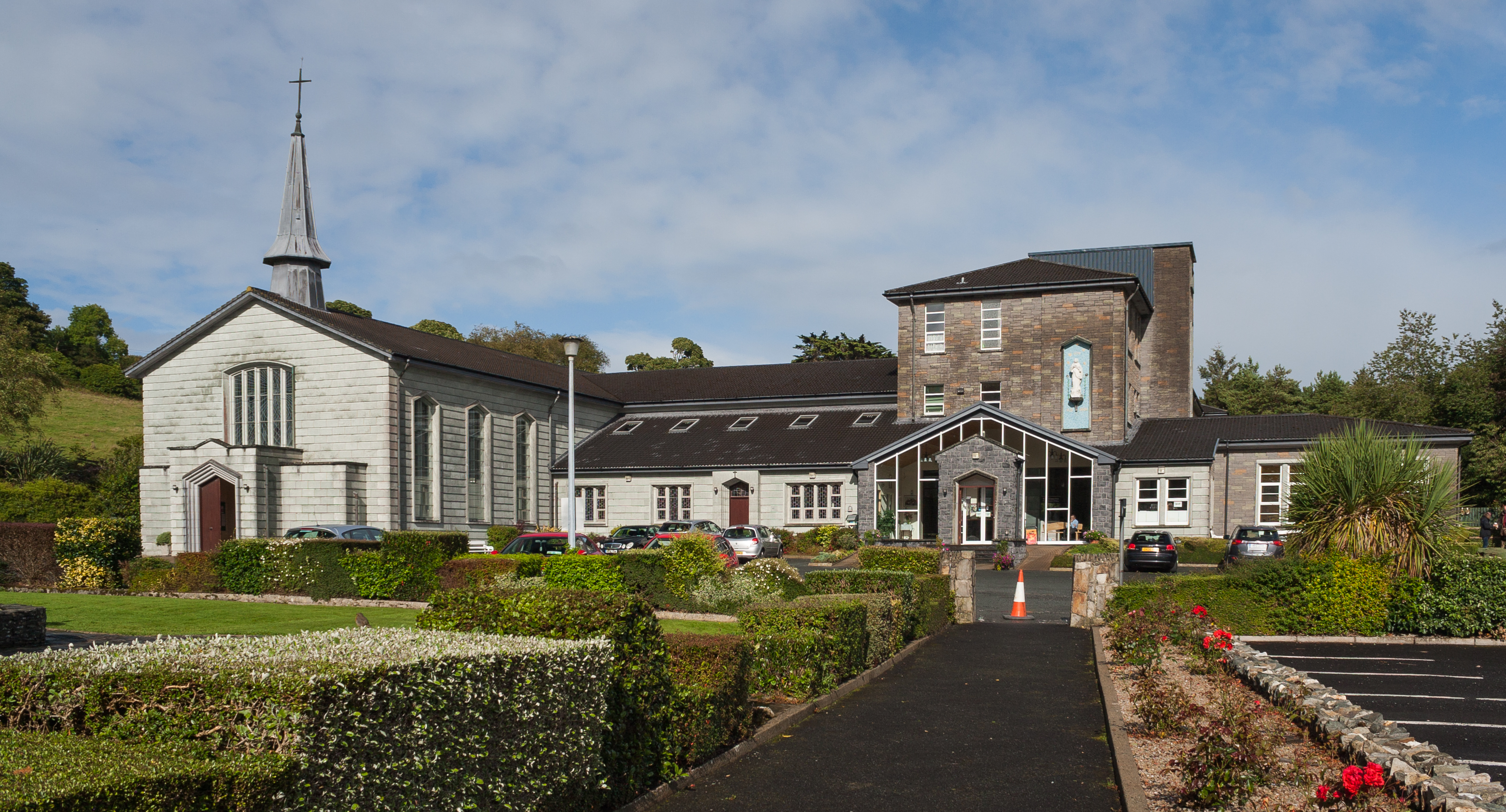
Ards Friary

Ards Forest Park is a park in County Donegal, Ireland. Located on the Ards Peninsula, the forest park is managed by Coillte. It is approximately 480 ha (1,200 acres) in area.

== History and location ==
The forest park is situated on the small Ards Peninsula. It sits on the shores of Sheephaven Bay on the northern coastline of County Donegal, Ireland. It's to be found on the N56 road, between Creeslough and Dunfanaghy. Ards Forest Park was formerly part of the Ards Estate, a country estate purchased by Alexander Stewart in the 1780s. The Ards Estate, centered on Ards House (demolished in the early 1960s), was owned by the Stewart family up until the early 1930s. The last member of the Stewart family to own the estate was Lady Ena Stewart-Bam, who inherited from her grandfather around 1904. She was the wife of Lt. Col. Sir Pieter C. van B. Stewart-Bam, Kt., O.B.E., a South African soldier, politician and businessman whom she married in 1910. The forest park is now owned by Coillte, a state body.

== Sights and walks ==
Today, the forest park is approximately 480 hectares in area and contains a range of wildlife and plants, as well as the remains of four ringforts and a number of megalithic tombs. According to legend, these tombs were the beds of Diarmuid and Gráinne in their flight from Fionn Mac Cumhaill.

The forest park has a number of signposted walks which pass the main features of the park. These include the Ards Heritage Trail, which is around 3.5 km long, the Nature Trail and the Green Trail, which are both approximately 3 km long, and the Red Trail, which is 13 km long, though this walk does give provisions for a short-cut back to the starting point should it be needed. There are several viewing points on these trails.

The Ards Heritage Trail passes a well called the Ague Well. This reputed holy well is associated with a number of stories of remedial powers. Also nearby is a Mass rock where mass was celebrated in defiance of the Penal Laws.

The forest park also has a picnic and children's play area and a snack outlet.

== Nearby ==
Just outside the forest park, at Ballymore on its northern border, is Clondehorky parish church, a Church of Ireland church built in the Georgian style in the mid-18th-century. This church may have been designed by Micheal Priestly. Directly opposite the church's main gate is Ballymore Arch, built for the Stewart family in the 19th-century to improve access from the church to Ards House, which was several miles distant at the edge of the small Ards Peninsula.
