= Mackoght =

Mountain in Ireland

- Mac Uchta
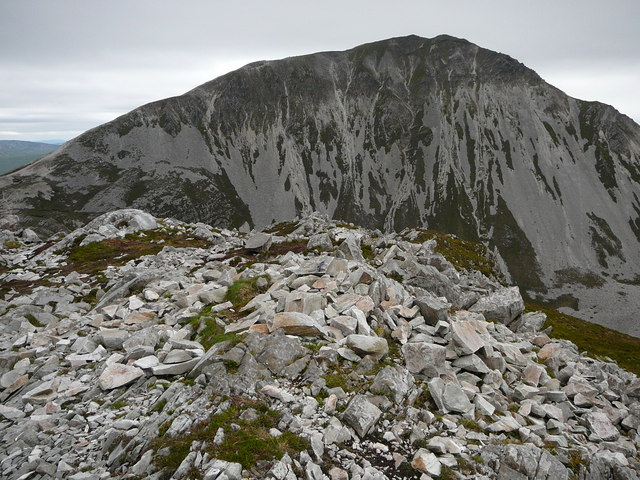
- The peak of Mackoght (foreground) with Errigal behind

Highest point
- Elevation: 555 m (1,821 ft)
- Prominence: 150 m (490 ft)
- Listing: Marilyn
- Coordinates: 55.03996°N 8.09460°W

Naming
- English translation: son of the mountain-breast
- Language of name: Irish

Geography
- Location within Ireland
- Location: County Donegal, Ireland
- Parent range: Derryveagh Mountains and the Seven Sisters
- OSI/OSNI grid: B940214
- Topo map: OSi Discovery 1

Mackoght or Macoght (from Irish Mac Uchta, meaning 'son of the mountain-breast'), also called Little Errigal or Wee Errigal (Irish: an Earagail Bheag), is a 555 metres (1,821 ft) high mountain in County Donegal, Ireland.

== Geography ==
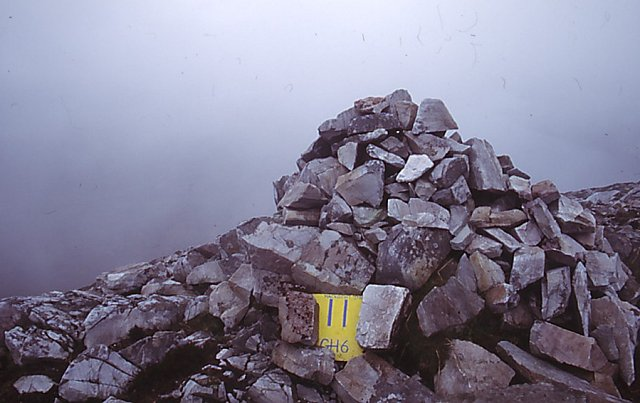
Summit cairn

The mountain is the second most southern and second lowest of the mountain chain called the Seven Sisters by locals. The Seven Sisters are Muckish, Crocknalaragagh, Aghla Beg, Ardloughnabrackbaddy, Aghla More, Mackoght and Errigal. The Seven Sisters are part of the Derryveagh Mountains. Mackoght is also the 351st tallest peak in Ireland.
