= Clady River (Gweedore) =

River in County Donegal, Ulster, Ireland

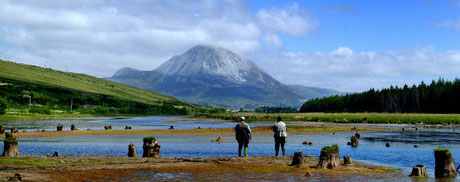
- Men fishing on the Clady River near An Chúirt Hotel (formerly known as The Gweedore Hotel). Errigal can be seen towering in the background.
- Etymology: Irish: An Chláidigh, meaning 'the One Who Washes' or 'the Strong-Flowing One')
- Native name: An Chláidigh (Irish)

Location
- Country: Ireland
- Province: Ulster
- County: County Donegal
- Barony: Kilmacrenan
- District: Gweedore (Irish: Gaoth Dobhair)

Physical characteristics
- Source
  - location: Lower Lough Nacung
- Mouth: Crolly River (also known as the Gweedore River)
  - location: Bunbeg
  - coordinates: 55°03′28″N 8°18′56″W
- Length: 5 miles (8.0 km) approx.

Basin features
- River system: Crolly River

The Clady River (Irish: An Chláidigh, meaning 'the One Who Washes' or 'the Strong-Flowing One') is a small river in Gweedore (Irish: Gaoth Dobhair), a district in the north-west of County Donegal in Ulster, the northern province in Ireland. The river flows entirely within the Civil Parish of Tullaghobegly (Irish: Tulacha Beigile).

== Course ==
The Clady River flows out of the western end of Lower Lough Nacung (Irish: Loch na Cuinge Íochtarach) in Gweedore. Lower Lough Nacung is immediately north-west of Upper Lough Nacung (Irish: Loch na Cuinge Uachtarach). The Clady River mainly flows in a west-north-westerly direction for its entire course, flowing into the Crolly River (Irish: Abhainn Chroithlí), also known as the Gweedore River, on the south-western outskirts of Bunbeg (Irish: An Bun Beag). The river enters the Crolly River beside Bunbeg Quay, very near the Crolly River's mouth. This part of the Crolly River is known as An Gaoth ('The Inlet' or 'The Estuary'), and is effectively an inlet of the North Atlantic. The Clady River is about 5 miles (8.0 km) in length.

The N56 crosses the Clady River near its source, crossing it very near the western end of Lower Lough Nacung. The R257 crosses the river at Clady Bridge in Bunbeg. Almost all of the R258 runs alongside the Clady River, this road running along the river's right bank, from near the river's source to its mouth at Bunbeg Quay.

== Hydroelectric scheme ==
In the second half of the 1950s, the E.S.B. built a hydroelectric power station in Gweedore. The power station, officially called Clady Power Station, is located in the townland of Dore, and is just under two miles south-west of where the Clady River leaves Lower Lough Nacung. The station is powered by water diverted from the Clady River. A 'canal' was built to carry the diverted water from the river, as it flowed out of Lower Lough Nacung, to the power station. The 'canal' branches off from the Clady River at the Gweedore Weir. The 'spent water' from Clady Power Station then flows directly into the Crolly River, also known as the Gweedore River. This power station, which was built between 1954 and 1959, remains in use today.
