= Shuggling Stone =

Famous boulder in Ireland

Coordinates: 55.1295°N 7.8450°W

The Shuggling Stone or "Clochnabogaddy" is a 13-ton boulder that sits at the edge of the moorland road between the Lackagh Bridge and Glen village near Dunfanaghy, County Donegal in Ireland.

It is called the Shuggling Stone because it "shuggles" – an Irish word meaning to rattle, shake or jiggle something – very easily. With the aid of a short stick, the boulder can be rocked or "shuggled" backwards and forwards.

The stone is a lump of glacial granite and was first recorded in 1834 by Lieutenant Lancey during the first Ordnance Survey of Ireland; he noted then that it could be rocked back and forth with one finger.
