= R252 road (Ireland) =

Road in Ireland

Coordinates: 54.865977°N 8.051553°W

R252 road
- Bóthar R252
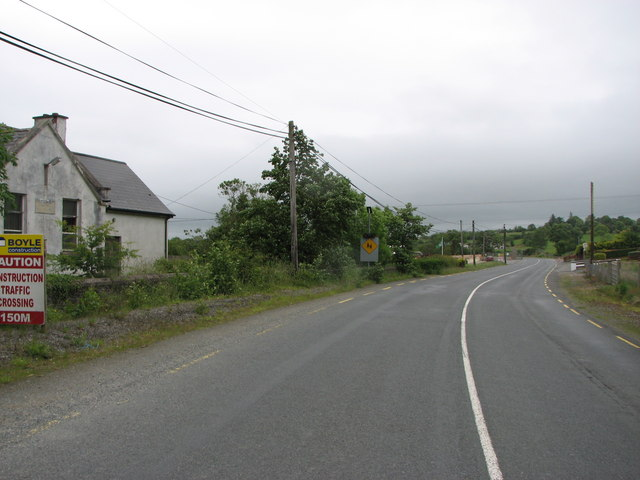
- View along the R252 at Dooish (An Dubhais)

Route information
- Length: 42.8 km (26.6 mi)

Major junctions
- From: N56 Cró na Sealg (Croaghnashallog)
- R254 Doocharry; R250 Fintown; R253 Aghaveagh
- To: N15 Ballybofey

Location
- Country: Ireland

Highway system
- Roads in Ireland; Motorways; Primary; Secondary; Regional

The R252 road is a regional road in Ireland, located in County Donegal. It runs between Ballybofey and Croaghnashallog, just southeast of Dungloe.

The road runs in two separate sections, between Croaghnashallog and Fintown, and between Meenmore East and Ballybofey, multiplexing with R250 for 3km through Fintown.

The road is almost entirely rural in character, save for its southeastern end where it enters the town of Ballybofey.
