= Poisoned Glen =

Valley near Dunlewey, County Donegal, Ireland

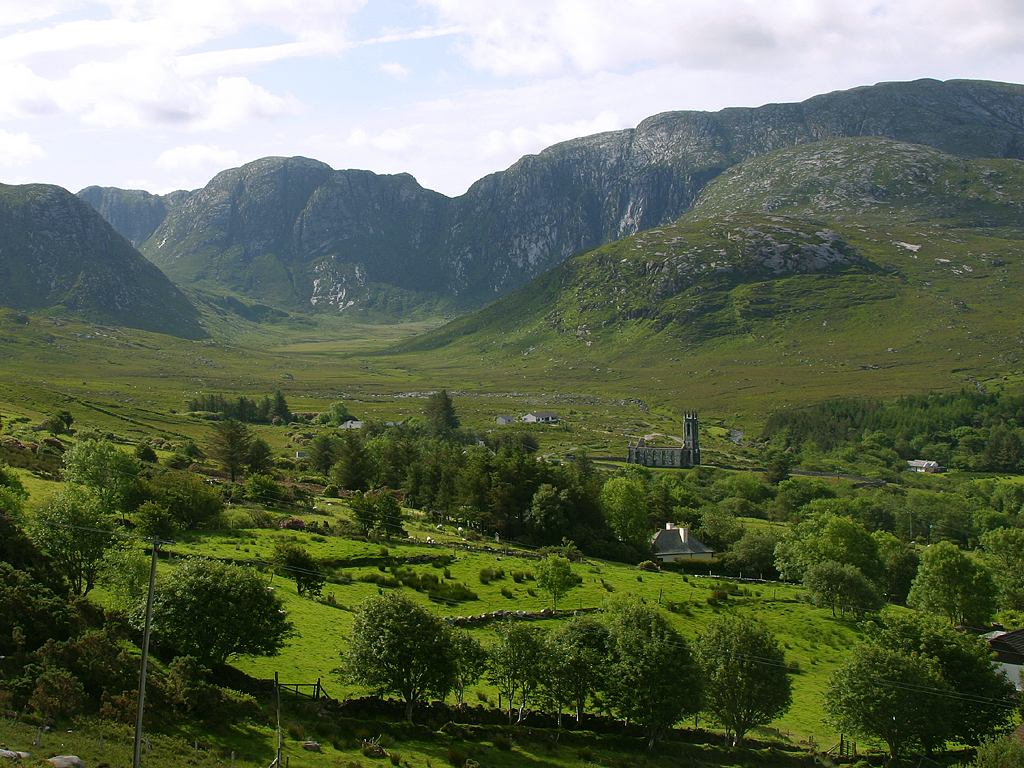
The Poisoned Glen range with the abandoned Church of Ireland church in the foreground

The Poisoned Glen (Irish: Cró Nimhe) is a glen or valley located near Dunlewey in Gweedore, a district in the north-west of County Donegal, Ireland. It is located beside Errigal and extends beyond Glenveagh National Park, facing Loch Altan. The Poisoned Glen is situated approximately 40 kilometres (25 mi) from Letterkenny. The Cronaniv Burn flows through the glen.

== Etymology ==
According to legend, the huge ice-carved hollow of the Poisoned Glen got its name when the ancient one-eyed giant king of Tory, Balor, was killed here by his exiled grandson, Lughaidh, whereupon the poison from his eye split the rock and poisoned the glen. An unsourced suggestion by the website Lonely Planet, however, states that the source lies in a cartographic gaffe. Locals were inspired to name it An Gleann Neamhe ('The Heavenly Glen'), but when an English cartographer mapped the area, he carelessly marked it An Gleann Neimhe – The Poisoned Glen.

== Arts and culture ==
A number of musicians associated with the area have been inspired by the location. For example, Clannad's album Anam (1990) included a track titled 'Poison Glen', and Altan released an album titled Gleann Nimhe – The Poison Glen (2015).
