= Dunfanaghy =

Village in Donegal, Republic of Ireland

Dunfanaghy Dún Fionnachaidh
- Village
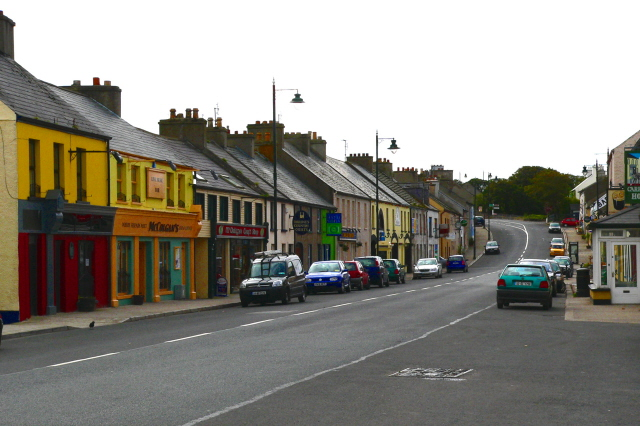
- Dunfanaghy's Main Street (N56) in 2005

- Location in Ireland
- Coordinates: 55.183°N 7.971°W
- Country: Ireland
- Province: Ulster
- County: County Donegal
- Barony: Kilmacrenan
- Elevation: 15 m (49 ft)

Population (2022)
  - Total: 439
- Time zone: UTC0 (WET)
  - Summer (DST): UTC-1 (IST (WEST))
- Irish Grid Reference: C015372

Dunfanaghy (Irish: Dún Fionnachaidh, meaning 'fort of the fair field') is a small town, former fishing port, and commercial centre on the north coast of County Donegal, Ireland. It lies on Donegal's North West coast, specifically the west side of Sheephaven Bay, on the N56 road (the West Donegal Coastal Route), 30 km north-west of Letterkenny.

== Description ==
The centre of Dunfanaghy is a small square with a market house built in 1847 and a quay built in 1831 and formerly used to export corn. There are four churches: the early 17th-century Clondehorky Old Church (now ruined), constructed during the Plantation of Ulster; Dunfanaghy Presbyterian Church; Holy Cross Church (Catholic and known locally as 'the Chapel'); and Holy Trinity Church of Ireland Church. The village is also home to a golf club, several art galleries and craft shops, and a museum, situated in part of a former workhouse, which describes the effects of the Great Famine on Dunfanaghy. Dunfanaghy is also home to St Michael's GAA, a Gaelic football club.

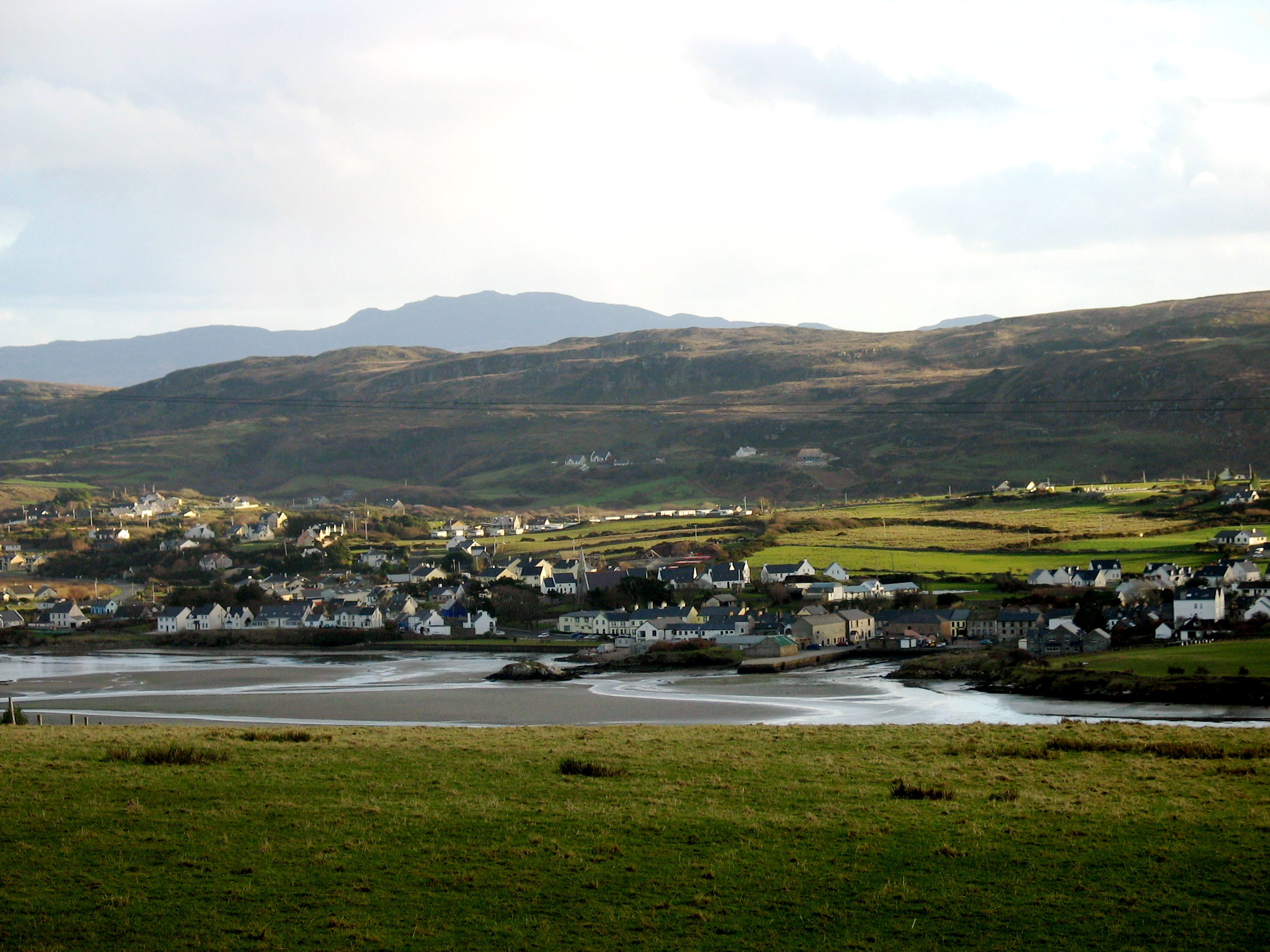
View of Dunfanaghy from Horn Head

== Local area ==
Just outside the village is a three-mile-long sandy beach known as Killahoey Strand. On 16 June 1942, a RAF Ferry Command Hudson aircraft (42-66130) was forced to land on a beach near Dunfanaghy. (Irish Army archive reports call this 'Hill Strand'.) It was feared the rising tides would swallow the plane, but 200 locals came out to pull it to safety. The aircraft was refuelled and the crew of four accommodated nearby overnight. They departed the next day to continue their delivery flight of the aircraft.

This event became confused with another aircraft landing in 1943 when, in the early 1990s, an American Harry X. Ford made an effort to find the town in which he crash-landed on 10 May 1943. Having visited the town in 1993 it was finally discovered he had not actually landed there but had been on a B-17 Flying Fortress which force landed on a beach at Bundoran on 10 May 1943. Irish Army Archive reports confirm Harry X Ford's presence in Bundoran and not anywhere near Dunfanaghy or Portnablagh. Some sources published around 1993 attribute a landing on 2 May 1943 to have taken place on Killahoey Strand but this is an error confirmed by Irish Army Archives and the archives of the United States Air Force.

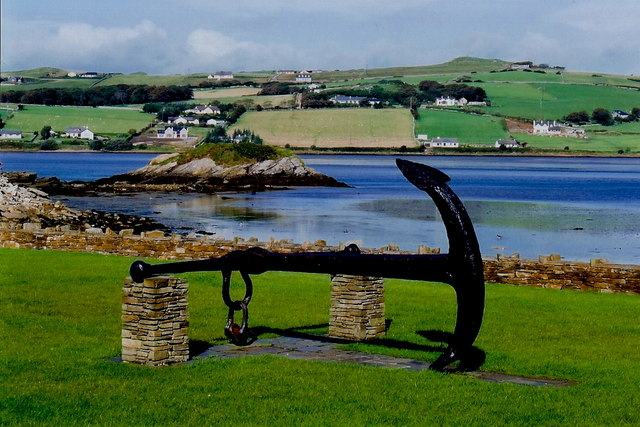
A disused anchor on display in the centre of the village

West of Dunfanaghy are New Lake and Tramore Strand, a two-mile-long beach. New Lake was formerly a salt water marsh, but during the First World War, over-cutting of the grass on the surrounding sand dunes led to their destabilisation and the movement of the sand to block up the river. As a result, the marsh filled with fresh water and became a lake. The sand also silted up Dunfanaghy harbour. The New Lake became a haven for seabirds and is now a Special Protection Area. Also nearby is Sessiagh Lough, a small lough with a crannog in the middle.

Across the bay from Dunfanaghy is Horn Head, which shelters Dunfanaghy from the Atlantic Ocean and is an Irish Natural Heritage Area. Dunfanaghy is close to Portnablagh and Marble Hill, both of which also have popular beaches. Other sights in the vicinity include: Ards Forest Park, Ards (Capuchin) Friary, the Shuggling Stone, Glenveagh National Park, Doe Castle and the Derryveagh Mountains, the most prominent peaks being Muckish and Errigal.

=== Workhouse ===
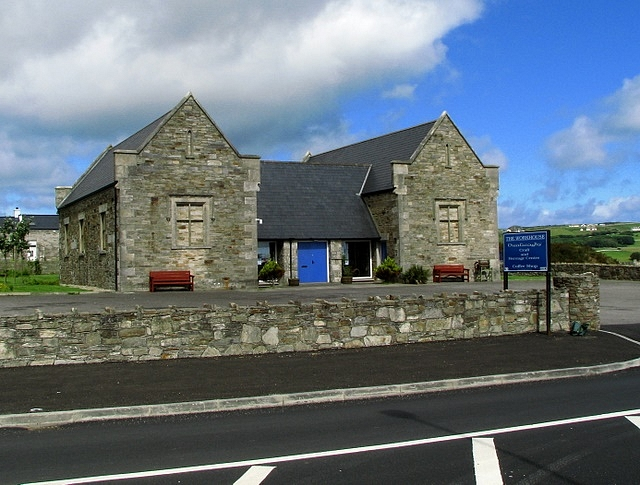
Dunfanaghy Workhouse Heritage Centre

As in many parts of Ireland in the mid nineteenth century, a Workhouse was constructed nearby for the detention and maintenance of destitute local people. The first occupants were admitted in June 1845, at the beginning of the Great Famine. Parts of the original building have recently been restored and now function as an interpretive centre of the Famine and its impact on the local inhabitants.

Near the workhouse, on the Falcarragh road, is the former Union fever hospital. Closed in 1922, it was reopened as a national school in the 1930s and fulfilled this role until the 1960s. Since 1968 it has been used as an artists studio and gallery.

== Transport ==
Dunfanaghy Road was previously a stop on the Londonderry and Lough Swilly Railway although the station was in fact six miles from Dunfanaghy itself. Dunfanaghy Road railway station opened on 9 March 1903, closed for passenger traffic on 3 June 1940 and finally closed altogether on 6 January 1947. Lough Swilly Buses served the area with four buses per day going from Dunfanaghy to Letterkenny and vice versa. Lough Swilly Buses also provided school transport to primary schools and the main secondary schools St Eunan's College and Loreto Convent Secondary School, Letterkenny during school terms until April 2014 when the company ceased trading.

In 2018, Dunfanaghy is very well served by bus services to and from Letterkenny, the largest town in County Donegal. Buses are provided by Mangan Tours Buses, Gallagher Coaches, Feda O'Donnell Coaches and John McGinley Coaches.

== Notable people ==
- Moya Cannon, author
- Mick McGinley, Gaelic footballer and father of golfer Paul
- Sir Gerry Robinson, businessman
- Peter Witherow, Gaelic footballer
- Sir Reginald Wolseley, 10th Baronet, Baronet of Mount Wolseley

== Notable establishments ==
- Breac House, a boutique hotel

== See also ==
- List of populated places in the Republic of Ireland
- List of towns and villages in Northern Ireland
