= Marble Hill, County Donegal =

Marble Hill Cnoc an Mharmair
- Townland
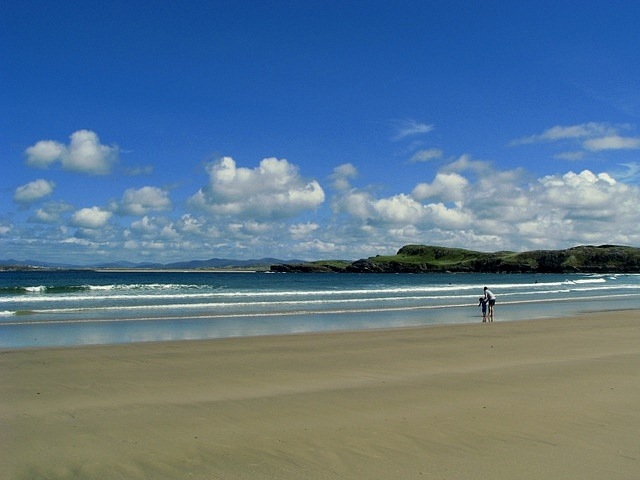
- Marble Hill beach

- Location in Ireland
- Coordinates: 55°10′25″N 7°54′10″W
- Country: Ireland
- Province: Ulster
- County: County Donegal
- Elevation: 15 m (49 ft)

Population (2016)
  - Total: 70
- Time zone: UTC0 (WET)
  - Summer (DST): UTC-1 (IST (WEST))
- Irish Grid Reference: C015372

Marble Hill (Irish: Cnoc an Mharmair) is a townland on the north coast of County Donegal, Ireland. It is very near Dunfanaghy, being located on the shores of Sheephaven Bay, and is known for the popular Marble Hill Beach. It is sometimes spelled in English as Marblehill instead of Marble Hill.

On 16 June 1942, during the Second World War, an RAF Lockheed Hudson landed on Marble Hill Beach. It took off from the beach again the next day following refuelling.
