= High Spirits (film) =

1988 film by Neil Jordan

- Theatrical release poster
- Directed by: Neil Jordan
- Written by: Neil Jordan
- Produced by: David Saunders; Stephen Woolley
- Starring: Daryl Hannah; Peter O'Toole; Steve Guttenberg; Beverly D'Angelo; Jennifer Tilly; Peter Gallagher; Liam Neeson; Martin Ferrero
- Cinematography: Alex Thomson
- Edited by: Michael Bradsell
- Music by: George Fenton
- Production company: Vision PDG
- Distributed by: Palace Pictures (United Kingdom and Ireland); Tri-Star Pictures (North America)
- Release dates: 18 November 1988 (United States); 9 December 1988 (United Kingdom and Ireland)
- Running time: 99 minutes
- Countries: Ireland; United Kingdom; United States
- Language: English
- Budget: $15 million
- Box office: $8.5 million (US)

High Spirits is a 1988 fantasy comedy film written and directed by Neil Jordan and starring Steve Guttenberg, Daryl Hannah, Beverly D'Angelo, Liam Neeson and Peter O'Toole. It is an Irish, British and American co-production.

== Plot ==
Cash-strapped Peter Plunkett has converted his ancestral home, the dilapidated Castle Plunkett, into a bed and breakfast after his father Peter Sr.'s death ten years prior. Owing money to Irish-American businessman, Jim Brogan, who attempts to move the castle to Malibu and convert it into a theme park called Irish World unless he has the money within three weeks time before facing foreclosure, Plunkett attempts to turn the castle into "the most haunted castle in Europe" for the tourist trade. Inspired by his mother Lavinia's stories about the castle being haunted, mostly by their Plunkett ancestors, he and his staff start creating costumes and effects for their first group of American guests.

After a staged haunting gone wrong on the first night and guest Malcolm Clay, a cynical parapsychologist visiting with his family, threatening to expose them, guest Jack Crawford learns about Plunkett's problem. As it turns out, Jim is Jack's father-in-law and Jack's wife, Sharon actually lied to him by using their second honeymoon for her father on a matter of business.

Later, Jack meets two real ghosts: one of them being Plunkett's 6th great-grand cousin, Mary (whose painting Jack admired earlier in the evening) and the other, her newly wedded husband, Martin Brogan, having a scuffle. The latter stabs her to death with his knife in a jealous fury under false accusations of infidelity, a constant "loop" that has been going on each night for nearly 200 years. When the ghosts re-enact the scene again, Jack inadvertently interrupts the "loop" by getting in the way. Mary soon becomes enamored of him.

Having learned about the current situation with the castle, all the ghosts including Plunkett's father, decide to help by staging a full-scale paranormal event. On the verge of leaving the castle, the ghosts sabotage their means of transport, strip the Americans half-naked, knock the phone lines out, and force them back into the castle through a manifested thunderstorm. Jack is spirited away and brought to Mary by her talking horse, Reynaldo. He soon learns of the story behind Mary's murder and that her marriage was an unhappy one arranged by her father. Meanwhile, Sharon finds herself enamored of Martin. Realizing how much Jack truly loves and cares about Mary, Lavinia decides to help him out by handing him a book which reveals that true love can bring the dead back to life on Halloween night (which is the following night and the one night of every year when ghosts turn into flesh) so long as the lovers do not have sex.

On Halloween night, Plunkett, his staff, and the guests suffer more hauntings. Jack and Mary have sex. Because of this, Mary becomes a living but rotting old corpse. Sharon professes her true love to Martin, whereas Jack gives Mary a kiss of true love which restores her original youth. As dawn approaches, Sharon aims to embrace Martin in her arms, but accidentally falls out the window and dies and Mary disappears. However, when lying by what appears to be his wife's "corpse", Jack finds out that it is actually Mary, in Sharon's clothes, having been resurrected. Jack and Mary kiss again whereas Sharon, now a ghost in Mary's wedding dress, kisses Martin before they vanish.

Despite the shocking experience, the guests have actually enjoyed their stay at the hotel and Clay promises to recommend Plunkett's castle as "the most haunted castle in the Western Hemisphere", saving Plunkett and his staff from financial ruin. Another guest, Brother Tony, a priest who was there for a vacation before taking his final vows, resigns from his state of priesthood to pursue a romantic relationship with guest Miranda. Jack decides to stay and dances with Mary before proposing to her. Martin and Sharon appear, and the two couples dance together.

== Cast ==
- Daryl Hannah as Mary Plunkett Brogan
- Peter O'Toole as Peter Plunkett
- Steve Guttenberg as Jack Crawford
- Beverly D'Angelo as Sharon Brogan Crawford
- Liam Neeson as Martin Brogan
- Jennifer Tilly as Miranda
- Peter Gallagher as Brother Tony
- Ray McAnally as Peter Plunkett Senior
- Martin Ferrero as Malcolm Clay
- Connie Booth as Marge Clay
- Donal McCann as Eamon
- Liz Smith as Lavinia Plunkett
- Mary Coughlan as Katie
- Ruby Buchanan as Great Aunt Nan Plunkett
- Isolde Cazelet as Julia
- Aimée Delamain as Great Granny Plunkett
- Tom Hickey as Sampson
- Krista Hornish as Wendy Clay
- Little John as Gateman
- Preston Lockwood as Great Uncle Peter Plunkett
- Paul O'Sullivan as Graham Clay
- Hilary Reynolds as Patricia
- Tony Rohr as Christy
- Matthew Wright as Woody Clay

== Reception ==
The film received negative reviews from critics. On Rotten Tomatoes it has a 31% rating based on 16 reviews. Daryl Hannah was nominated for the Golden Raspberry Award for Worst Supporting Actress at the 9th Golden Raspberry Awards.

== Home media ==
Scream Factory released the film on Blu-ray disc in 2015. It was packaged as a double feature with Vampire's Kiss on February 13, 2015. The film was released on Blu-ray from Final Cut on August 24, 2020 in the UK.

== See also ==
- List of ghost films
