= An Grianán Theatre =

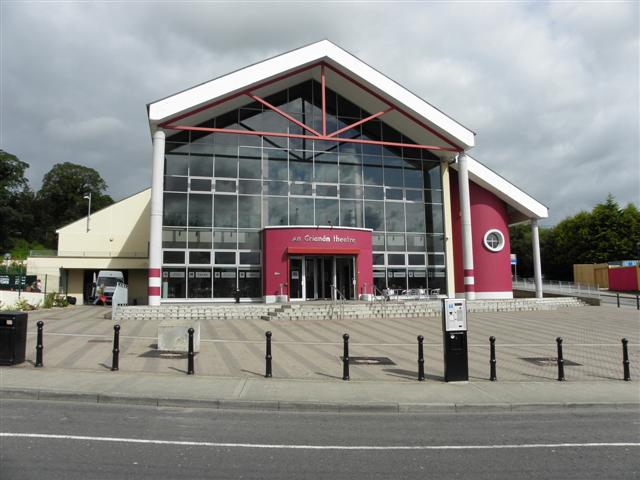
- The front view of An Grianan Theatre in Letterkenny, County Donegal
- Interactive map of the An Grianán Theatre area

General information
- Type: Theatre
- Architectural style: Modern
- Location: Letterkenny, County Donegal, Ireland
- Coordinates: 54°57′11″N 7°43′53″W
- Completed: 1999
- Opened: October 1999

Website
- angrianan.com

An Grianán Theatre (Irish: Amharclann an Ghrianáin) is the largest theatre in County Donegal. Located in Letterkenny's Port Road district, its current director is Patricia McBride. With a seating capacity of 383, the theatre provides a range of programming including drama, comedy, music, pantomime, and family shows as well as workshops and classes.

It is used annually as a festival venue, including for the Earagail Arts Festival, and has twice hosted Fleadh Cheoil na hÉireann. It is a main partner of the Earagail Arts Festival, which takes place each year in July, the Irish Aerial Dance Fest which takes place each June, and the Letterkenny Trad Week which takes places each January.

The theatre was named after Grianán of Aileach (‘Stony House of the Sun’), a prehistoric ring fort located in Burt believed to date back to 1700 BCE.

== History ==
In 1995, Labour politician Seán Maloney advised the then Minister for the Arts, Culture and the Gaeltacht Michael D. Higgins to view a site in Letterkenny in exchange for a lift to a Labour Party function in Donegal. Higgins visited the Rectory Field, declared it the best site for a theatre he had ever seen and approved a £1.5 million grant the following February for what would become An Grianán Theatre. The North West Theatre Project launched a major fundraising campaign in March 1997.

An Grianán first opened its doors on 4 October 1999 and had its official opening later that year on 12 November. Magic of the Musicals was the first show performed on the An Grianán stage.

It hosted Fleadh Cheoil na hÉireann in the summers of 2005 and 2006. It hosted the Pan Celtic Festival in 2007.

On Saturday 12 May 2007, a Rathmullan based graphic design studio picked up the 2007 European Design Award in Athens, Greece. A jury of Europe's top design critics selected the studio's variable design for An Grianán Theatre from a pool of work by many other top European designers.

In 2013, it won an award as the IMRO Ulster Music Venue of The Year.

In 2015, it won an award for its Disability Access.

In 2024, it celebrated 25 years since opening, with an anniversary Gala and Exhibition.

In December 2025, it closed for renovations until The New Year.

== Performances ==
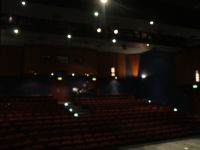
View from An Grianan's stage

An Grianán has been used as a venue for the Smithwick's Comedy on Tap festival

Music

An Grianán has attracted a number of well-known musicians, actors, and comedians. The Frames play there on a regular basis. The Letterkenny Trad Week, which took place in January 2015, featured a number of artists such as Maura O’Connell and Karan Casey, Paddy Glackin and John Doyle. Scottish singer Isla Grant made a return to Ireland in February 2015 with her tour, playing in An Grianán on the 10th. In 2005, Sharon Shannon played in An Grianán.

In 2000, An Grianán was the venue for the world premiere of the Irish musical Caisleain Oir. The musical is based on the Irish novel of the same name but it is in the English language. It returned in 2001 and 2005, and was produced by An Grianan Productions in 2013.

Below is a list of other notable bands and musicians who have performed at An Grianán:

- Albert Niland (13 October 2006)
- Sharon Shannon (4 May 2005)
- Jack L (4 November 2006)

Comedy

Ardal O’Hanlon brought his stand-up act to An Grianán in May 2012 (Ardal played Father Dougal McGuire in Father Ted). Neil Delamare is a regular performer at the theatre. Other comedians to perform at the venue have included:

- Des Bishop
- Tommy Tiernan
- Ardal O'Hanlon
- Dara Ó Briain
- Dylan Moran
- Ed Byrne
- Jimmy Carr
- Colin Murphy
- Neil Delamere
- Andrew Maxwell
- Brendan Grace
- Pat Shortt
- Jon Kenny
- Phil Kay
- Jason Byrne
- David O'Doherty
- Serena Terry
- Anne Gildea
- Colin Geddis

Drama and dance

Some drama or dance acts that performed in 2014:

Ireland's most acclaimed dance company, Fabulous Beast came to An Grianán in September 2014 with their international hit Rian UnPlugged. The Irish Aerial Dance Fest provides workshops and performances for three weeks each June.

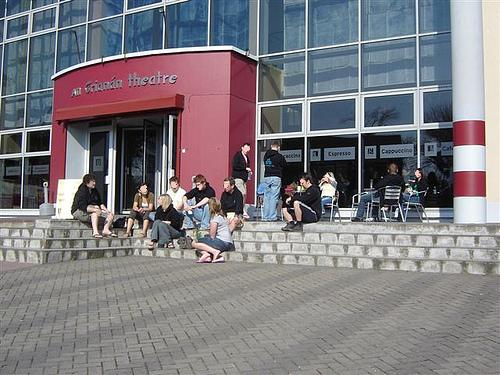
A group of young people gather outside the Theatre

== 2006 performances ==
Below is a list of notable dramas and dances which were performed at An Grianán in 2006:

National and international

- Knots by CoisCeim Dance Theatre (21 February 2006)
- Like Watching Paint Dry by Ursula Mawson-Raffalt and Anthony J Faulder-Mawson (21—23 September 2006)
- I Miss Communism by Inez Wurth and Mark Soper (29 September 2006)
- Death of a Salesman by Arthur Miller – (Keegan Theatre Co) (10—11 October 2006)
- Dancehall by Luail - Ireland's National Dance Company ( 18 October 2025)

Local

- 12 Angry Men performed by Lifford Players (14–—15 March 2006)
- Ay Carmela by José Sanchis Sinisterra in association with Wink Productions (21–22 March 2006)

== Facilities ==
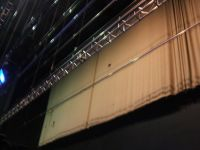
Backstage at An Grianán

Public facilities

An Grianán can also be used as a corporate venue, offering advanced technical and catering facilities. In addition to this, a full range of projection equipment is available for use.

The Coffee House café is open Monday to Friday from 9.30 until 3.30, and transforms into a bar on show nights.

There are full facilities for people with disabilities including designated seating in the auditorium, a lift and specially adapted WC. There is also a Sennheiser Assistive Listening system in the auditorium that operates via an app using a smartphone.

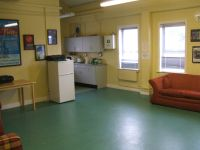
The green room of An Grianán Theatre

Private facilities

The backstage area has a number of facilities for visiting performers including three dressing rooms, private bathrooms and a green room. There is a framed T-shirt in the green room declaring it ‘the best room in Ireland’ signed by Oscar-winning songwriter Glen Hansard of The Frames. There is also a costume department that can be found through a series of doors off the downstairs foyer that has a number of props and costumes from previous shows. There are also a number of workshop areas backstage and off the foyer downstairs. A mirror may be found on the right as one heads from the green room toward the stage. The stage is entered through a door from the left-hand side facing the audience.

== Exhibitions ==
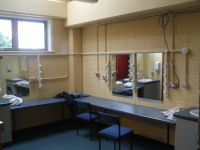
A dressing room backstage at An Grianán Theatre

An Grianán Theatre is no longer accepting exhibitions as of 2025 due to some planned renovation and improvement works taking place.

== Workshops and classes ==
An Grianán Youth Theatre

An Grianán Youth Theatre usually meets on a Wednesday and Thursday. It has run a number of small one-off productions in the past in Letterkenny. Some past productions include A Vampire Story (2022), The Wolves of Willoughby Chase (2018), Blackadder Goes Forth (2017) and immersive theatre productions like Bugsy Malone (2020), and Alice’s Adventures' in Wonderland (2019).
