= Muckish =

Mountain in County Donegal, Ireland

- Muckish / an Muckish
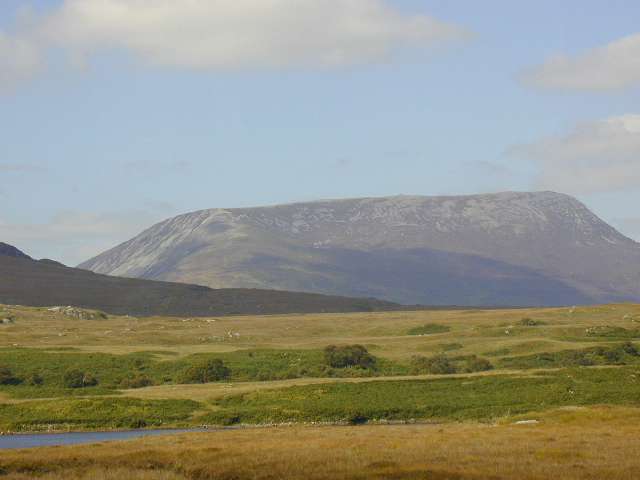

Highest point
- Elevation: 667.1 m (2,189 ft)
- Prominence: 522 m (1,713 ft)
- Listing: Marilyn, Hewitt
- Coordinates: 55.105550°N 7.994523°W

Geography
- Location within Ireland
- Location: County Donegal, Ireland
- Parent range: Derryveagh Mountains
- OSI/OSNI grid: C004287
- Topo map: OSi Discovery 2

Muckish (Irish: Mucais / an Mhucais, meaning '[the] pig's back') is a distinctive flat-topped mountain in the Derryveagh Mountains of County Donegal, Ireland. At 667.1 metres (2,189 ft), it is the third-highest peak in the Derryveagh Mountains and the 163rd highest in Ireland. Muckish is also the most northern and second highest of the mountain chain called the "Seven Sisters" by locals. The Seven Sisters are Muckish, Crocknalaragagh, Aghla Beg, Ardloughnabrackbaddy, Aghla More, Mackoght, and Errigal.

== Overview ==
High-grade quartz sand was mined on the flanks of the mountain; the remains of the quarry workings can be seen on its northern side. The "Miner's Path" is a route to the summit up the northern side of the mountain. Part of this route follows the path used by the workers to reach the quarry. The sand was exported and was mainly used in the manufacture of optical glass. A less difficult route to the summit begins from the Muckish Gap on the southern side of the mountain.

A large cairn (man-made mound of stones), visible from sea level, can be found on the summit plateau. This marks a Bronze Age court tomb. In 2000, a large metal cross was placed on the summit, replacing a wooden one that had been destroyed in a storm. The new cross was placed much closer to the northern end of the mountain, while the cairn is towards the south.

Falcarragh, Moyra, Dunfanaghy, and Creeslough are the villages nearest to Muckish. On the Falcarragh side lies Mám na Mucaise ("gap of Muckish") in which one finds Droichead na nDeor ("bridge of tears"). It was from this bridge that many thousands of Cloughaneely emigrants bade farewell to family members. Percy French, the famous poet, visited the district at the beginning of the 20th century and while in Falcarragh Hotel he wrote a poem called "An Irish Mother".

In 2012, a 40-minute documentary about Muckish was released, called "Glass Mountain: The Story of Muckish Sand".

== Gallery ==
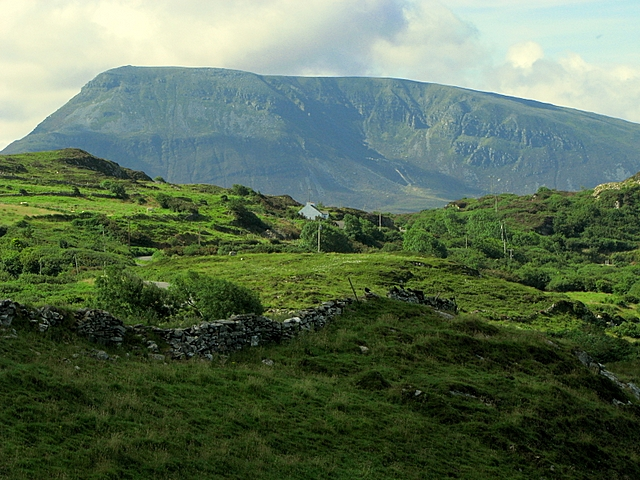
Muckish from Roshin, near Croaghaderry

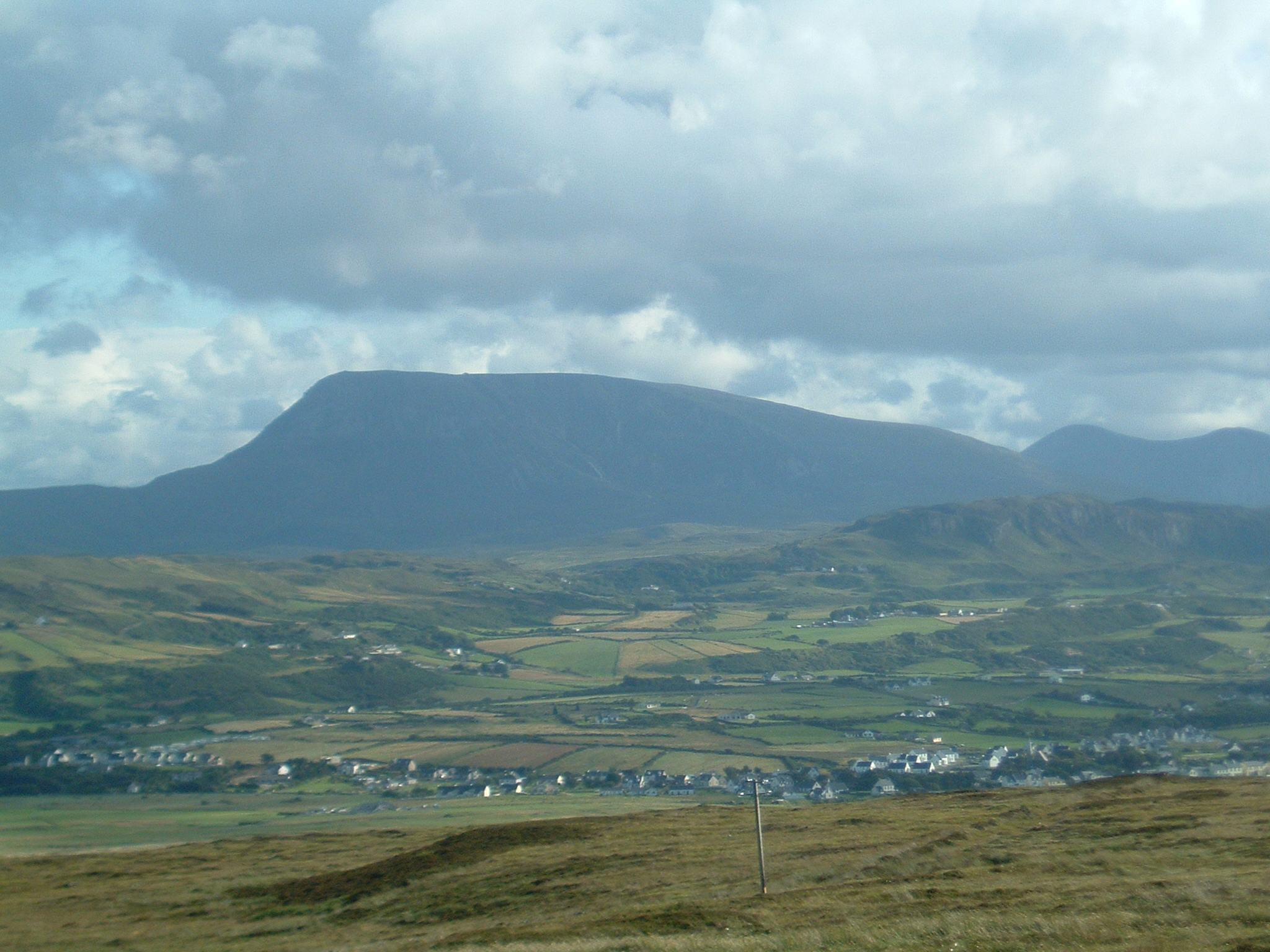
Muckish from Horn Head

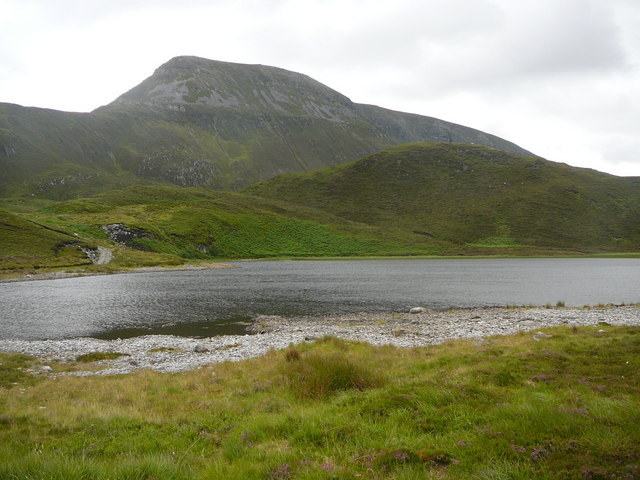
Muckish from Lough Naboll
