= Bunbeg =

Gaeltacht village in County Donegal, Ireland

Coordinates: 55°03′39″N 8°18′01″W

Bunbeg An Bun Beag
- Village and townland
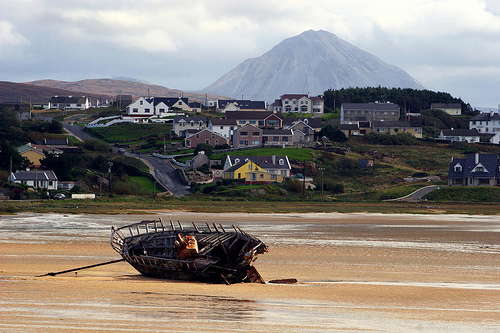
- Bunbeg with Errigal in the background and Bád Eddie (Eddie's Boat) on Magheraclogher Strand
- Etymology: "the small river mouth"
- Location in Ireland
- Country: Ireland
- Province: Ulster
- County: County Donegal
- Parish: Gweedore
- Time zone: UTC+1 (IST)
  - Summer (DST): UTC+1 (IST)

An Bun Beag (anglicised as Bunbeg), meaning "the small river mouth", is a small Gaeltacht village and townland in County Donegal, Ireland. It is officially the smallest townland in Gaoth Dobhair (Gweedore), but today the name Bunbeg is used to describe a large region of the parish. It is situated between Derrybeg and the townland of Dore and is home to many of Gweedore's amenities and businesses. The Clady River (Irish: An Chláidigh) flows into the Crolly River (also known as the Gweedore River) beside Bunbeg Quay, on the south-western outskirts of Bunbeg.

There is a ferry service from Bunbeg to nearby Tory Island.

== Storm ==
On 23 June 2009, a severe thunderstorm struck the villages of Bunbeg and Derrybeg and other parts of Gweedore. It lasted for several hours and caused two rivers to burst their banks, flooding houses and businesses, and damaging roads and bridges. Lightning strikes damaged power lines and mobile phone services, causing those trapped by the floods to be unable to communicate. Described as the worst storm 'in living memory', it was also the most severe since 1880 when 5 people drowned in Derrybeg. While the highly localised nature of the storm meant the bulk of the rainfall missed the network of rain gauges, the Irish Meteorological Service estimated that up to 60 mm (2.4 in) of rain fell between 2pm and 6pm on that day.

== Amenities ==
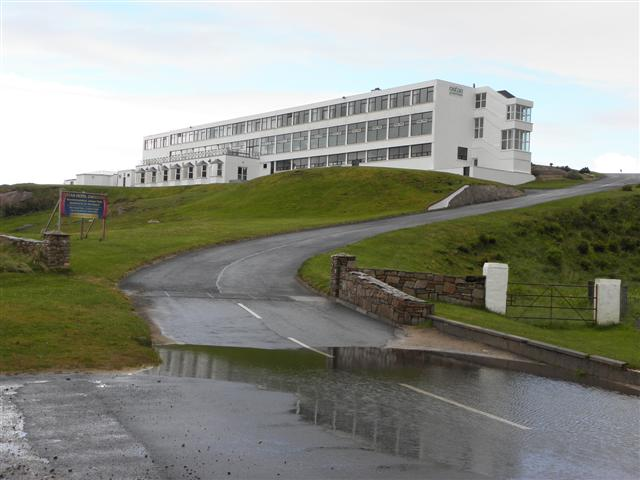
Óstan Gaoth Dobhair in 2011.

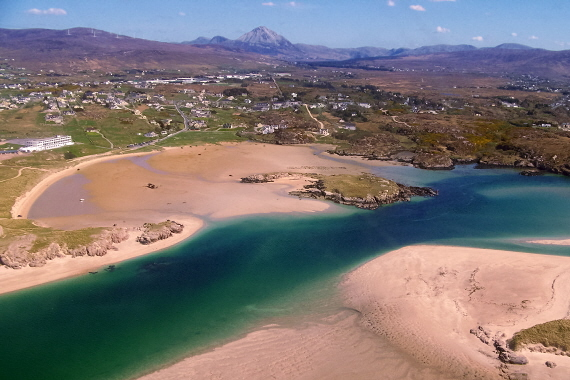
Aerial view of Óstán Gaoth Dobhair, Magheraclogher beach, bád eddie and some of the surrounding area.

The former Óstán Gaoth Dobhair is situated beside Magheraclogher beach. Built in 1970, it became a well-known attraction in the area, attracting notable guests included George Best and Paddy Crerand. It closed in 2015 and has been abandoned since. The hotel used to be very popular for weddings and other events in the area due to its picturesque location and the size of the function rooms. It was bought by private developer in 2020, with plans to redevelop the hotel and provide apartments.

Another hotel, Óstán Radharc na Mara (Seaview Hotel), also closed in 2015. Like with Óstán Gaoth Dobhair, it too was bought by the same developer in 2020 for redevelopment, with work beginning in 2022. The hotel has been used to accommodate refugees since the Russian Invasion of Ukraine.

There are a number of public houses in the area, such as Teach Hiúdaí Beag. The Irish-American gangster, Vincent 'Mad dog' Coll, was born above Teach Hiúdaí Beag.

There is a pier in the area, built in the 1830s to encourage fishing. It has ferry routes to both Tory Island and Gola Island available. The local coast guard station is also situated at the pier.

== Education ==
There is an Irish-medium primary school in the area called Scoil Chonaill (Connell's School) with around 100 pupils.

The secondary school for the wider Gweedore area is Pobalscoil Gaoth Dobhair, which is also an Irish-medium school.

== Bád Eddie ==
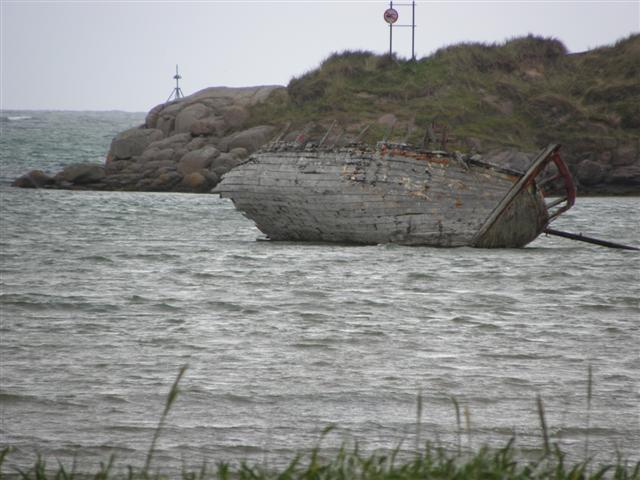
Bád Eddie in 2011

There is an iconic shipwreck on the beach known as Bád Eddie (Eddie's boat). The large fishing boat, originally built in Brittany, France, was called "Ami Des Flots" (friend of the waves). At some point its name was changed to Cara Na Mara (friend of the sea), before finally being called Bád Eddie after its final owner. In 1977, it came ashore for minor repairs and remained there for unknown reasons.

The shipwreck is best known for featuring in Bono and Clannad's 1985 hit song In A Lifetime in which it was struck by lightning. It has also featured in Vogue magazine. Michael Moore also stated it was his view of the ship that inspired him to finish his book 'Dude Where's my Country'.

As of 2020, some efforts had been taken to preserve and salvage the ship, as decades of exposure to the elements and the sea have led to its degradation.

== Appearances in music ==
Bunbeg is mentioned in the song "Left in Peace" from the album Finisterres (1997) by Héritage des Celtes.
