= Serena Terry =

Irish comedian and author

Serena Terry is an Irish comedian and author of two books: Mammy Banter - The Secret Life of an Uncool Mum and The Sh!te before Christmas.

== Online presence ==
Terry was introduced to TikTok through her daughter, ultimately joining TikTok during the COVID-19 lockdowns, where she started the account Mammy Banter. At the time she was attempting to “detox” from social media. The motivation to start her own channel originated from wanting to create “warts” on social media, in contrast to the “airbrushed perfection” on platforms such as Facebook and Instagram, a source she claims was at the root of her insecurities. Mammy Banter video skits use a number of everyday scenarios such as "homework struggles and fussy eating to the trials of swimming with kids, parent-teacher meetings, dealing with teenagers and first day back at work blues". In spite of her perceived confident presence online, Terry has previously spoken about her struggles with anxiety and depression.

Serena made the decision to quit as chief operations officer at the tech company she worked for in Derry once her TikTok channel achieved relative success. Mammy Banter was never monetised, to avoid "selling my soul to the advertising gods". To pay the bills, Terry set up an online digital marketing consultancy, Catchy Co.

== Publications ==
London publisher HarperCollins emailed Terry to ask she consider writing a novel in the spirit of Mammy Banter. Terry's first novel Mammy Banter - The Secret Life of an Uncool Mum, explores topics such as "mummy guilt, relationship insecurities, bad hair days and cyberbullying". The book's protagonist, Tara Gallagher, seeks a more relaxed life in contrast to her former self, which sought out to obtain everything. In The Sh!te Before Christmas, Tara wants a perfect Christmas for her family, yet she finds herself alone in the decision-making: misbehaving children, her husband unusually distracted, as well as Tara's mother, who she describes as being “glamorous, feckless, boundary-less”, deciding to move back in with her for the holidays.

== Other appearances ==
In addition to her work on TikTok and her two books, Terry has made a cameo for the Channel 4 series Derry Girls as an RUC officer, has sold out two UK and Ireland stand-up comedy tours, performed at The Edinburgh Fringe and is currently touring her 2026 show THERAPY throughout the UK and Ireland with plans for Canada, America and Australia shows in the works.

== Personal life ==
Terry is from Derry, Northern Ireland, where she lives with her husband and two children.

During the COVID-19 pandemic lockdowns, Terry home-schooled her children while working a 60-hour week from home as chief operations officer for her tech company. During that period, Terry describes grieving over the loss of her 38-year-old twin brothers, Patrick and Daniel, months earlier. Patrick died from liver cancer during the second half of 2019. Daniel, a comedian, also struggled with his mental health, in addition to drugs and alcohol, died just eight weeks afterwards from alcohol-related illness. She also experienced a severe bout of postpartum depression soon after, which led to depression and anxiety.
