= Diocese of Raphoe =

Diocese of Raphoe can refer to:

- The Roman Catholic Diocese of Raphoe
- The former Church of Ireland (Anglican) diocese of Raphoe is now incorporated within the united Diocese of Derry and Raphoe
