= Sheephaven Bay =

Coordinates: 55.196°N 7.900°W

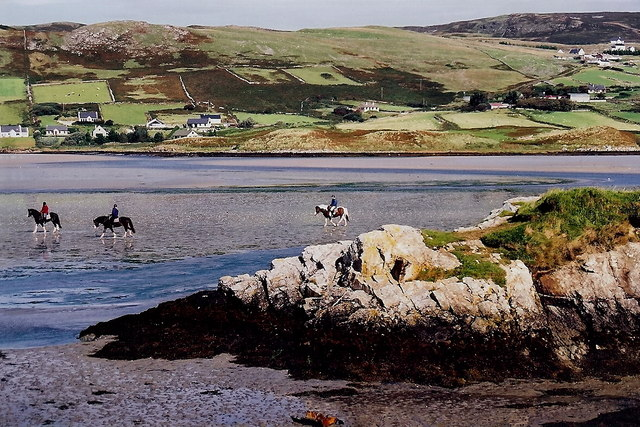
View of Sheephaven Bay from Dunfanaghy. Horn Head is beyond.

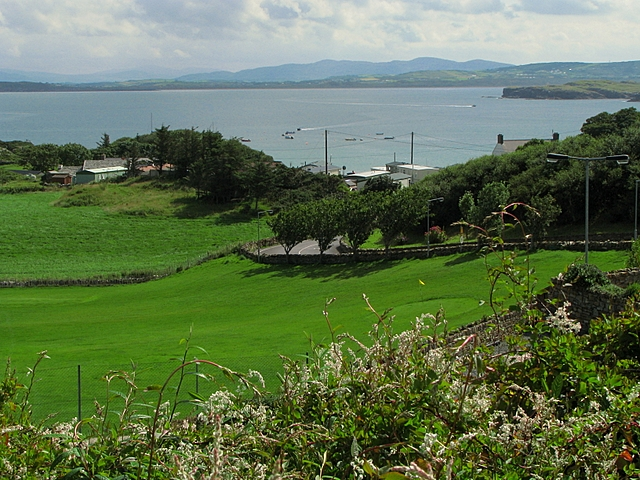
Looking down onto Sheephaven Bay near Marble Hill

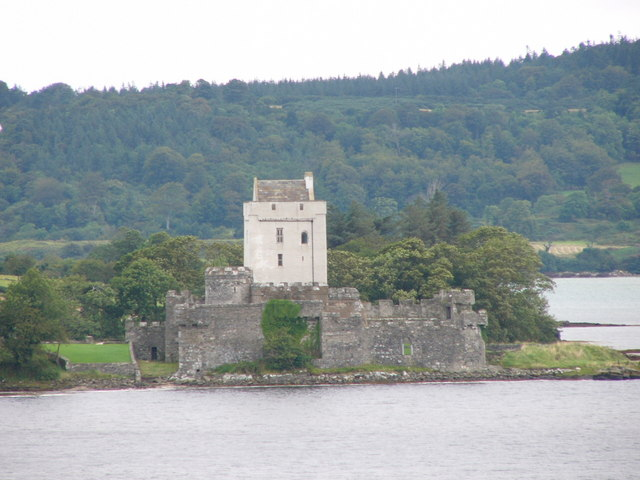
Doe Castle on Sheephaven Bay

Sheephaven Bay or Sheep Haven (Irish: Cuan na gCaorach) is a broad, shallow inlet on the north coast of County Donegal, Ireland. Bounded by the peninsulas of Rosguill to the east and Horn Head (Irish: Corrán Binne) to the west, the bay is relatively protected from the full force of the Atlantic Ocean, and has supported a large herring fleet.

== Etymology ==
The Irish name Cuan na gCaorach may be a recent translation of the English name to Irish. Some older maps say "Ship Haven", with Irish translation Cuan na Long, but this is considered incorrect.

== Doe Castle ==
Sheephaven Bay is home to Doe Castle, located near Creeslough, which was built in the early 16th century. The castle, which still stands, was a stronghold for the Clan Sweeney (Clan Suibhne) for 200 years.

== Settlements around the bay ==
- Carrigart
- Creeslough
- Downings
- Dunfanaghy
- Horn Head
- Marble Hill
- Portnablagh
