= Horn Head =

Peninsula in Donegal, Ireland

Coordinates: 55°11′57″N 7°58′57″W

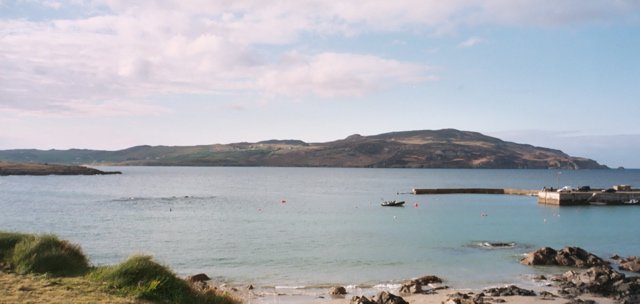
View of Horn Head taken looking across Sheephaven Bay from Portnablagh.

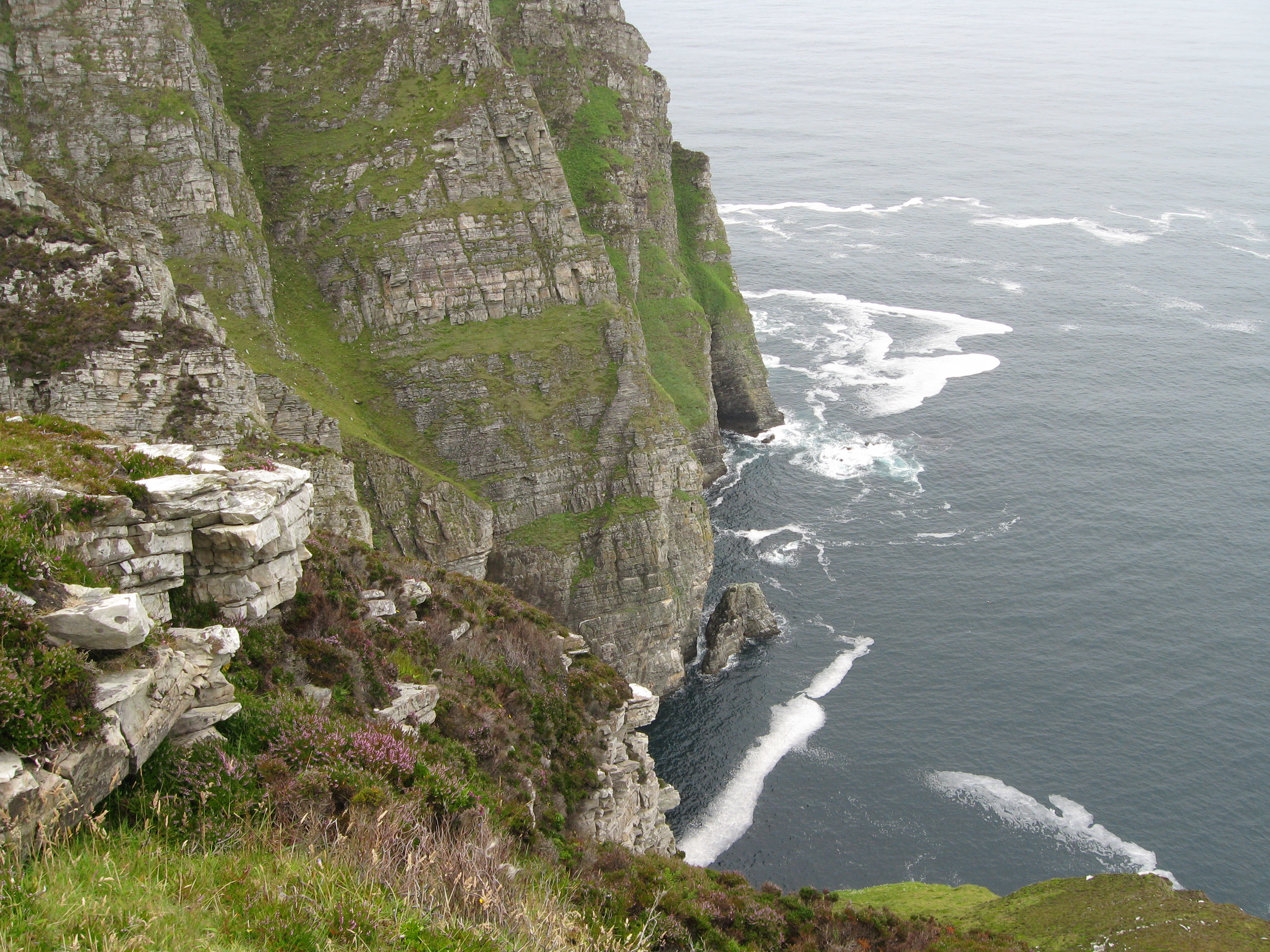
Horn Head cliffs taken from the Napoleonic-era lookout tower

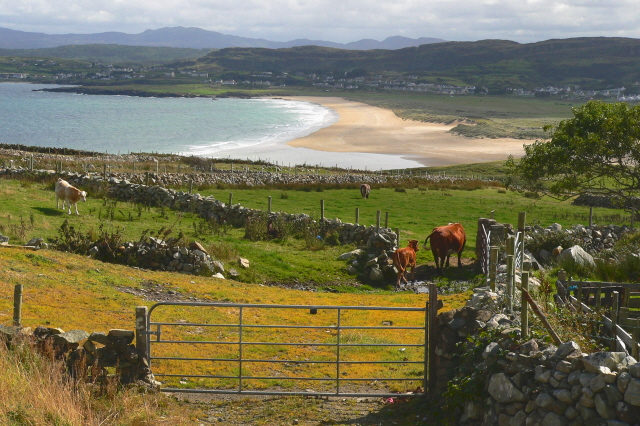
Dunfanaghy from Horn Head

Horn Head (Irish: Corrán Binne, meaning 'point of the cliff') is a peninsula in northwest County Donegal, Ireland, close to Dunfanaghy. It forms part of Sheephaven Bay.

== Archeological significance ==
Horn Head has many remains of Neolithic stone circles, court tombs, passage tombs and prehistoric field boundaries.

== Natural Heritage Area ==
Horn Head cliffs rise straight out of the water to a height of about 180 metres (600 ft) on the ocean side of the peninsula. They are an internationally important colony for breeding seabirds. Species include the European shag and the razorbill. It is designated as an Irish Natural Heritage Area and as a refuge for fauna specifically seabirds. Horn Head cliffs are also designated a Special Protection Area and a Special Area of Conservation by the Irish government.

== McSwyne's Gun ==
McSwyne's Gun is a blow hole on the west side of the peninsula. Previously, during storms, water could be forced through it to a height of 60–90 metres (200–300 ft) with a noise that could be heard 16 kilometres (10 mi) away. Although still functional, it is not as spectacular any more. Several people have been killed after getting too close and falling in.

== Horn Head House ==
Horn Head House, or Landlord's House as it is locally known, stands on the Sheephaven Bay side of Horn Head. The Horn Head estate was bought in 1700 by Captain Charles Stewart, a veteran of the Battle of the Boyne, who commissioned William Wray of Ards to build the present house in 1701, when it was the largest house in the Dunfanaghy area. Stewart was appointed High Sheriff of Donegal for 1707–1708. It remained the seat of the Stewarts of Horn Head, several of whom were also High Sheriffs, from then until 1935. It has been empty since then.

== Lookout towers ==
Horn Head has remains of two lookout towers, one from Napoleonic times and one from World War II. Both give views of the Atlantic Ocean and Tory Island.

== Sources ==
- Alistair Rowan (1979). The Buildings of Ireland: North West Ulster. Yale University Press. ISBN 0-300-09667-4.
