= N56 road (Ireland) =

Road in Ireland

N56 road
- Bóthar N56
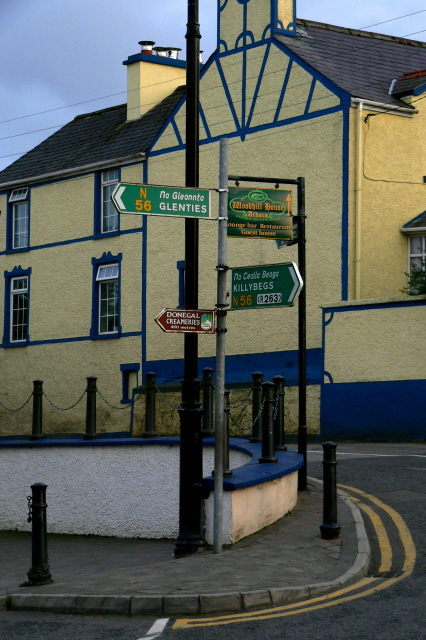
- N56 in Ardara

Route information
- Length: 157.304 km (97.744 mi)

Location
- Country: Ireland
- Primary destinations: County Donegal; N15, just east of Donegal Town, Inver; crossing the R263 near Killybegs; Ardara, Glenties, Dungloe, Loughanure, Gweedore, Portnablagh, Dunfanaghy; Letterkenny at end of N14 road

Highway system
- Roads in Ireland; Motorways; Primary; Secondary; Regional

The N56 road is a national secondary road in Ireland that runs from Donegal Town clockwise to Letterkenny. As originally designated, it included the section of the N13 between Stranorlar and Letterkenny, forming a circular route including parts of the N15.

The route runs through the Gaeltacht in north-western County Donegal, forming a main coastal route in Ulster.

The road bypasses Donegal Town and Mountcharles at the southern end of the route, and skirts the edge of Letterkenny at the eastern end. Significant upgrade work began construction between 2012 and 2019 to upgrade parts of the route between Donegal Town and Dungloe in two separate schemes; from Mountcharles to Inver and from Glenties to Dungloe. Further works are being undertaken just south of Glenties in 2025.

It is proposed to bypass Dunkineely in a future stage of work from Inver to Killybegs in the Donegal County Development Plan

== See also ==
- Roads in Ireland
- Motorways in Ireland
- National primary road
- Regional road
