= Derryveagh Mountains =

Mountain range in Ireland

- Irish: Cnoic Dhoire Bheatha
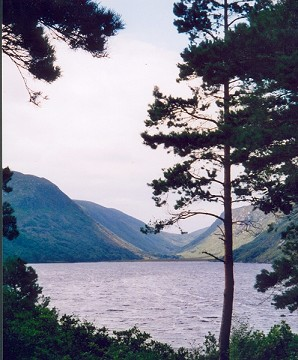
- Lough Beagh, in the grounds of Glenveagh Castle

Highest point
- Elevation: 751 m (2,464 ft)
- Coordinates: 55°01′N 8°03′W

Geography
- Country: Ireland
- Provinces of Ireland: Ulster

The Derryveagh Mountains (Irish: Cnoic Dhoire Bheatha) are the major mountain range in County Donegal, Ireland and part of Glenveagh National Park. The range makes up much of the landmass of the county and is the area of Ireland with the lowest population density. The mountains separate coastal parts of the county, such as Gweedore and Glenties, from the major inland towns such as Ballybofey and Letterkenny. The highest peak is Errigal, at 751 m (2,464 ft). The area features several hiking trails.

== See also ==
- List of mountains in Ireland
