= Errigal =

Mountain in Donegal, Ireland

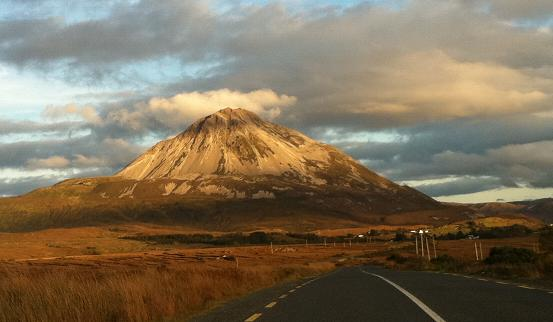
- A view of Errigal from Gweedore.

Highest point
- Elevation: 751 m (2,464 ft)
- Prominence: 688 m (2,257 ft)
- Listing: County top (Donegal), P600, Marilyn, Hewitt
- Coordinates: 55.033°N 8.112°W

Naming
- Native name: An Earagail (Irish)
- English translation: oratory

Geography
- Location within Ireland
- Location: County Donegal, Ireland
- Parent range: Derryveagh Mountains
- OSI/OSNI grid: B928207
- Topo map: OSi Discovery 1

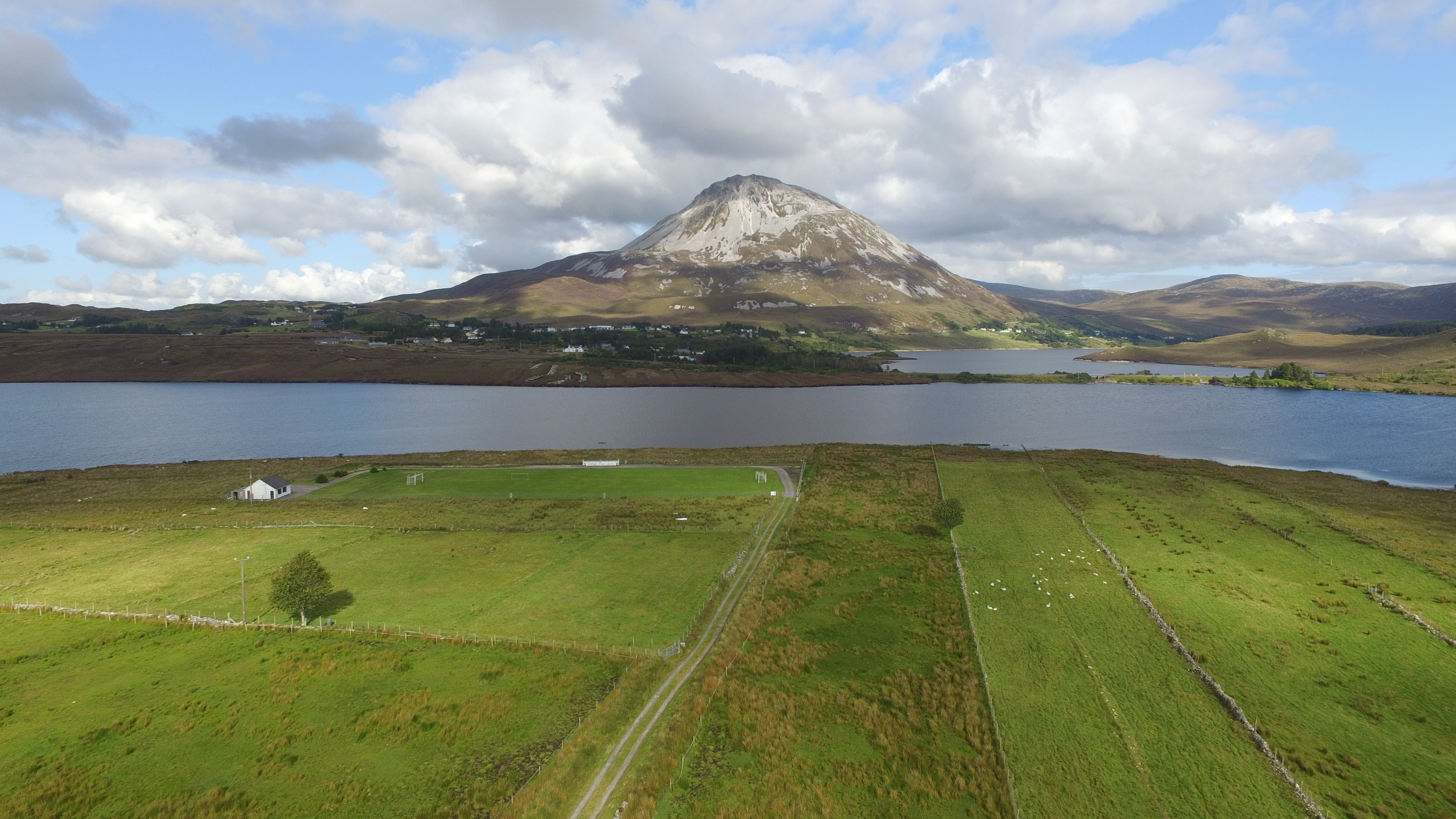
An aerial view of Errigal

Errigal (Irish: An Earagail) is a 751-metre (2,464 ft) mountain near Gweedore in County Donegal, Ireland. It is the tallest peak of the Derryveagh Mountains and the tallest peak in County Donegal. Errigal is also the most southern and the highest of the mountain chain called the "Seven Sisters" by locals. The other peaks of the Seven Sisters are Muckish, Crocknalaragagh, Aghla Beg, Ardloughnabrackbaddy, Aghla More, and Mackoght.

== Geography ==
Errigal is the most southern, steepest and highest of the mountain chain, called the "Seven Sisters". The Seven Sisters includes Muckish, Crocknalaragagh, Aghla Beg, Ardloughnabrackbaddy, Aghla More, Mackoght and Errigal. The nearest peak is Mackoght (from Irish: Mac Uchta, meaning "son of the mountain-breast") which is also known as Little Errigal or Wee Errigal (Irish: an Earagail Bheag).

Errigal is known for the pinkish glow of its quartzite in the setting sun. Another noted quality is the ever-changing shape of the mountain depending on what direction you view it from. Errigal was voted 'Ireland's Most Iconic Mountain' by Walking & Hiking Ireland in 2009.

== Naming ==
In legend Errigal is said to have been named by the Fir Bolg who, originating in Greece, came to worship Errigal as they had Mount Olympus.

The name comes from the Old Irish airecal, meaning "oratory". There are no remains of an oratory on the mountain, so it may refer to the mountain as a whole as a place of prayer.

In recent years, there have been numerous erroneous references to Mount Errigal. In 2016, the Republic of Ireland's State tourism authority, Fáilte Ireland, apologised for using the name "Mount Errigal" in its brochure, rather than the proper name. The official name is An Earagail or Errigal. Mount Errigal is the name of a hotel in Letterkenny, County Donegal.

== In popular culture ==
- In the 1985 music video, "In A Lifetime" by Clannad and Bono, several images of Errigal appear.
- In 1990, Errigal features prominently in the music video for The Chills' song, "Heavenly Pop Hit".
- In the 1991 song by Goats Don't Shave called "Las Vegas (In the Hills of Donegal)" contains the line, "To stand on top of Errigal, would give me such a thrill".
- In the 2008 film Hunger, the main protagonist Bobby Sands describes Errigal as a "beautiful sight".
- In the 2011 movie Your Highness, several scenes were shot on Errigal
- In 2012, Irish composer Vincent Kennedy, as part of his music for The Happy Prince, titled a piece: "Snowfall on Errigal"
- The song "Gleanntáin Ghlas' Ghaoth Dobhair", written by Proinsias Ó Maonaigh, begins with the lines:

"Céad slán ag sléibhte maorga Chondae Dhún na nGall / Agus dhá chéad slán ag an Earagal árd / Ina stua os cionn caor 's call".

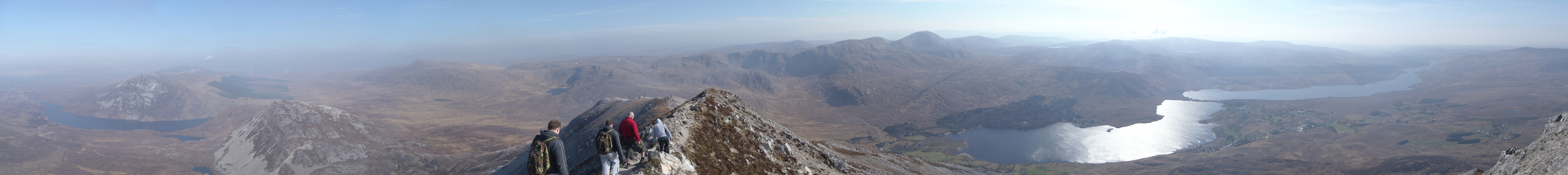
Panoramic view of Errigal's summit.

== Gallery ==
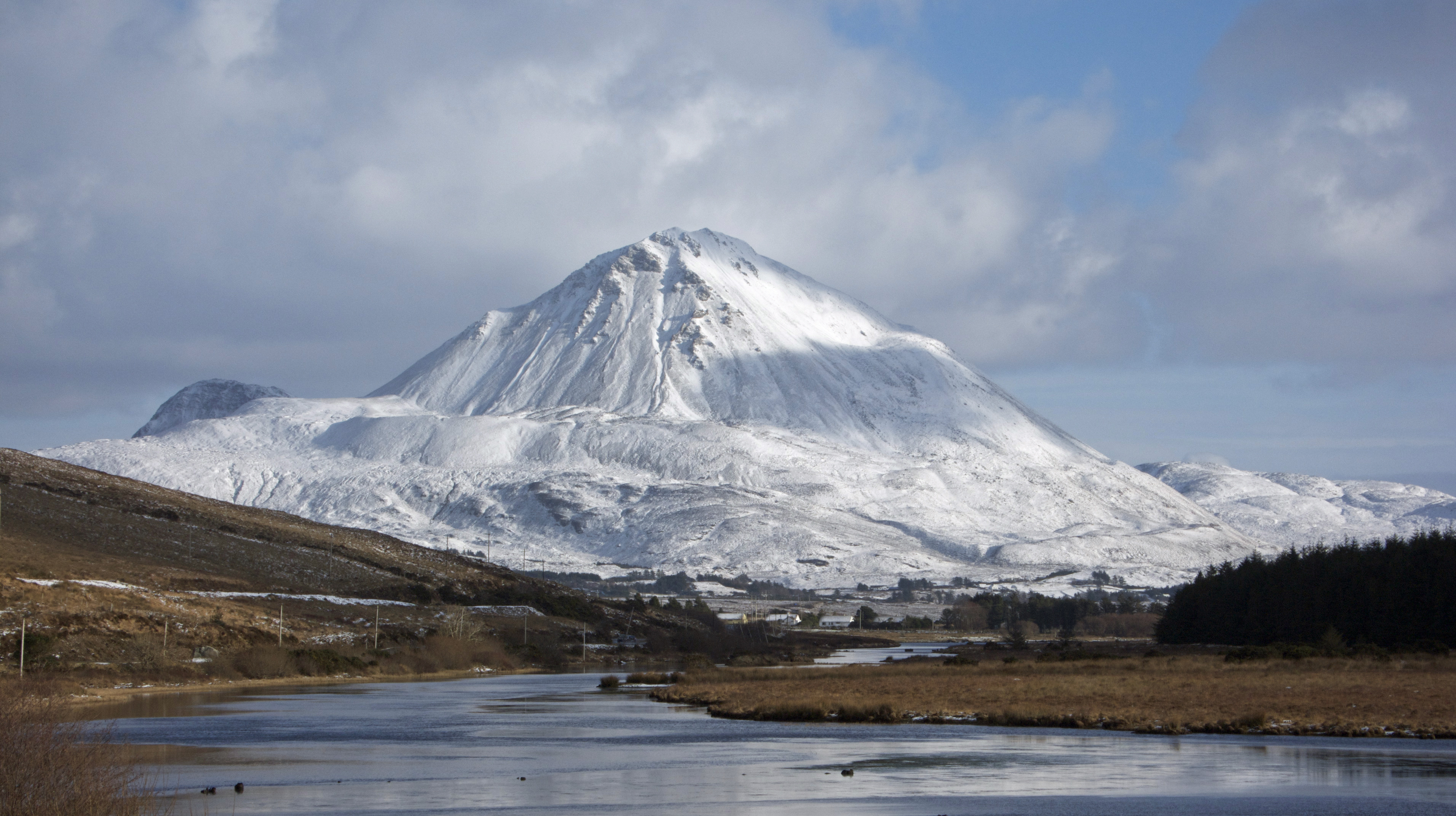
From An Chúirt.

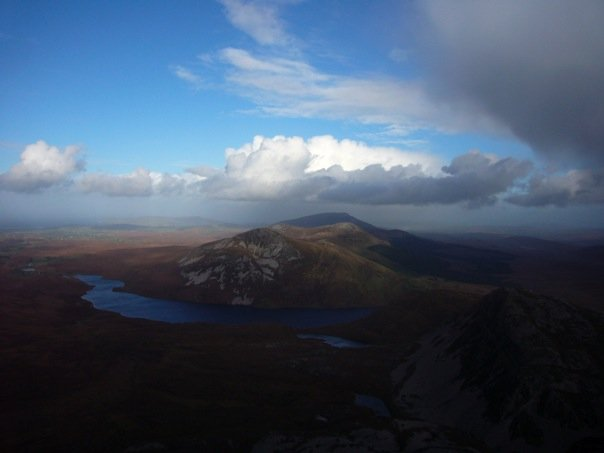
The view from Errigal.

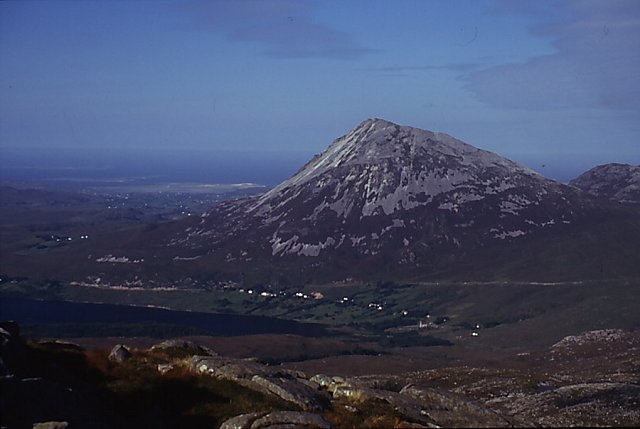
Errigal as seen from Slieve Snaght.

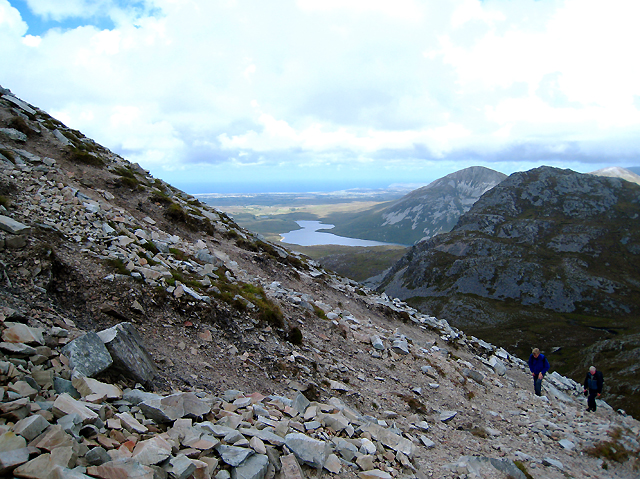
Ascending Errigal.

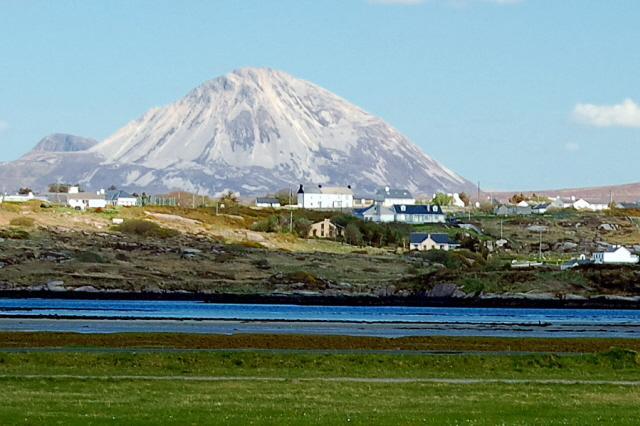
Errigal as seen from The Rosses.

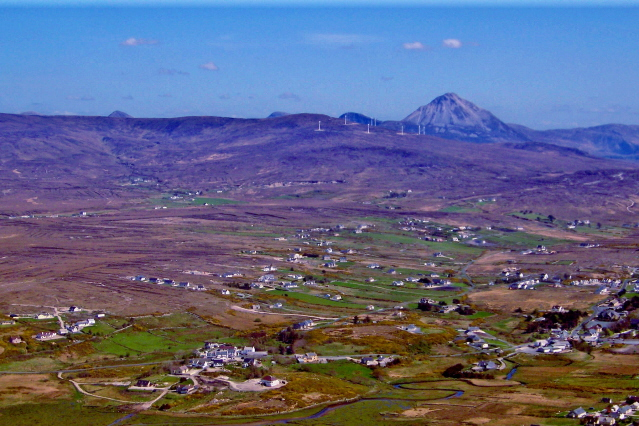
An aerial view of Errigal and Gweedore.

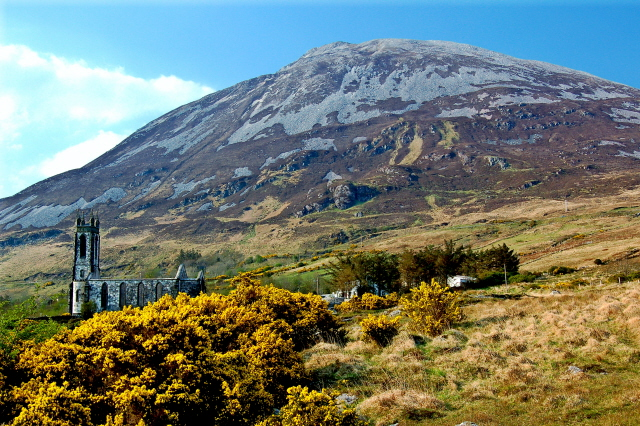
Derelict church at the foot of Errigal.

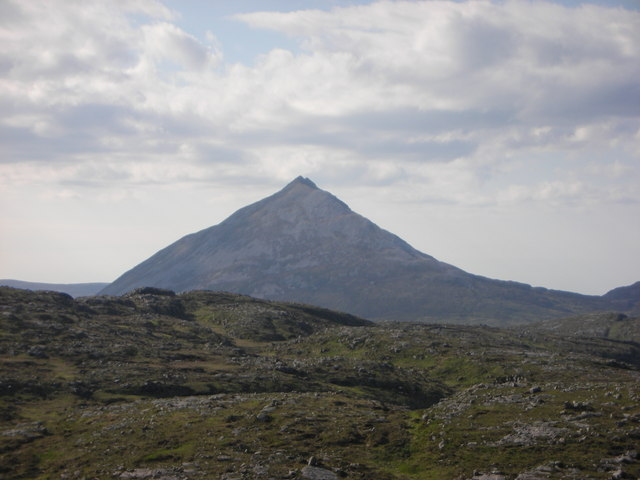
Errigal as seen from Cloughaneely.

== See also ==
- Lists of mountains in Ireland
- List of Irish counties by highest point
- List of mountains of the British Isles by height
- List of P600 mountains in the British Isles
- List of Marilyns in the British Isles
- List of Hewitt mountains in England, Wales and Ireland
