= John Doherty (musician) =

- Born: John Doherty; 1900; Ardara, County Donegal
- Died: 26 January 1980 (aged 80) Ballyshannon, County Donegal
- Genres: Irish traditional music
- Occupation: Musician
- Label: Folktrax Comhaltas Ceoltóirí Éireann Gael Linn Records Topic Records Claddagh Records

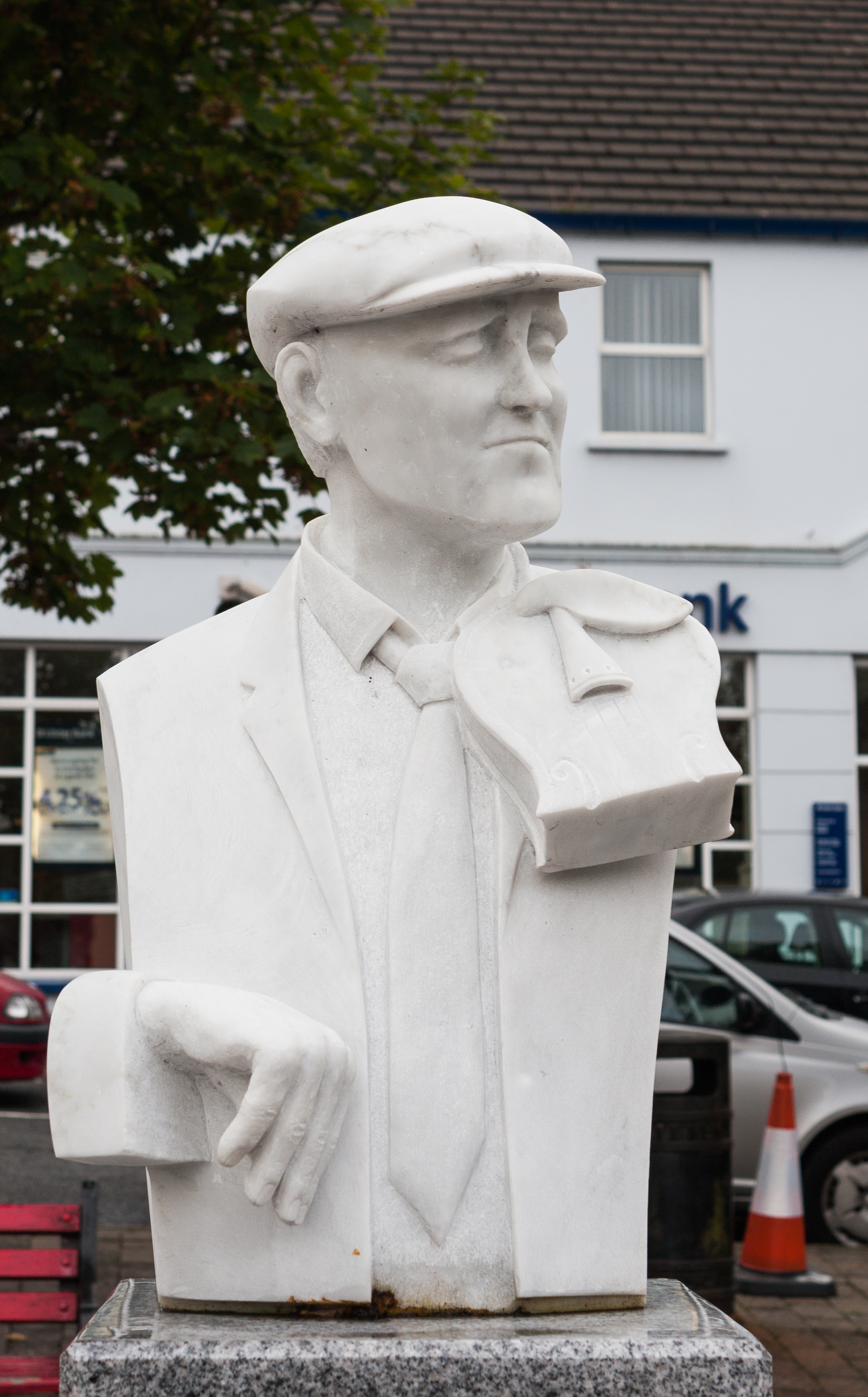
Sculpture of John Doherty at the Diamond in Ardara, created by Redmond Herrity and unveiled in 2013 in celebration of the 5th anniversary of the John Doherty Festival

John Doherty (1900 – 26 January 1980) was an Irish folk fiddler.

== Biography ==
John Doherty was born in 1900 in Ardara, County Donegal. He came from a family of Irish Travellers who worked as tinsmiths and horse traders. His birth certificate was uncovered in recent years, firstly by Professor Alun Evans, and subsequently by researcher Caomhín Mac Aoidh, allowing confirmation that his date of birth was 1900, rather than 1895, which has been recorded in error in several publications. His father Mickey 'Mor' Doherty was a fiddler as were a number of his brothers and sisters. Mickey Doherty married Mary McConnell, a singer (whose brothers Alec and Mickey were well-known musicians in south Donegal). Together they had nine children and John was the youngest. In an interview in the 1970s, he said that he had to practice in the barn as a teenager, and was not allowed to play fiddle in the company of his parents until he had mastered "Bonny Kate". He heard recordings of James Scott Skinner and imitated his style. His brother, also called Mickey, tended to play more in the style of Michael Coleman. Mickey was also recorded, notably on the album "The Gravel Walks".

From the late 40s to the 1970s collectors sought him out. The Floating Bow contains recordings made between 1968 and 1974 by Professor Evans in the town-land of Glenconwell. This collection arguably comprises the most extensive collection of his music, and was made when some argue Doherty was at his peak as a musician. He played with much ornamentation, including bowed and slurred triplets, rolls, 'cuts', mordents (particularly on long 'first-finger' notes), double-stopping (based on standard western music principles, normally highlighting the tonic and third of a particular chord). Heavily influenced by the Scottish bagpiping tradition, he often replicated the sound of the pipes' drones, by either re-tuning the fiddle to an open tuning ('scordatura'), or by maintaining the fourth finger on the string below the pitch of the melody. According to Alex Monaghan in the magazine, "The Living Tradition", he was a significant influence on the fiddle playing of The Chieftains and Altan. Doherty was also a story-teller, and some of his tales appear on the liner notes to "The Floating Bow".

Doherty sometimes did not carry a fiddle with him on his travels because he knew that, if needed, he was always likely to be provided with one when he visited "house dances" (folk music parties hosted by a family in their own house). The Floating Bow was played on a borrowed fiddle (owned by Professor Evans). He once travelled to Dublin to play in the Oireachtas Championships. He was first recorded in 1945 by The Irish Folklore Commission during one of his trips to Teelin in Southwest Donegal and later by the BBC (Peter Kennedy) in Belfast in 1953. 10 of these 1953 recordings were issued on Traditional Dance Music of Ireland (various artists). Kennedy's recordings were later issued in three volumes on the Folktrax label, the first of which was Pedlar's Pack (1964). These recordings are available from Topic Records who now own the copyright. Paddy Glackin first met him in 1965, and was heavily influenced by John. He could probably be described as the last of the travelling fiddlers. He died in Ballyshannon Rock Hospital, County Donegal.

== Discography ==
=== Folktrax Label ===
- 1964 Pedlar's Pack (English Folk Dance and Song Society – EFDSS LP 1003)
- 1964 The Star of Donegal
- 1964 The Fiddler and the Fairy (with Mickey Doherty)
- 1964 The Sailor on the Rock (with Simon Doherty)

=== Comhaltas Ceoltóirí Éireann Label ===
- 1974 Johnny Doherty (Comhaltas Ceoltóirí Éireann – CCÉ CL 10)

=== Gael Linn Records ===
- 1978 Johnny Doherty (double LP; retitled Taisce – The Celebrated Recordings when reissued on CD in the 1990s – Gael Linn CEF(CD) 072; compiling recordings dating from a session organised by Francis Rohleder (John Doherty's niece) in either 1974 or 1975)

=== Topic Records ===
- 1980 Bundle and Go (Topic Records – 12TS 398; recorded 1977; reissued in on CD on Green Linnet Records – GLCD 3077)

=== Claddagh Records ===
- 1996 The Floating Bow (Claddagh Records – CCF31CD; recorded 1968–74 at a farmhouse in Glenconwell, Ardara, County Donegal by Alun Evans using an Akai reel-to-reel stereo recorder; John Doherty played Evans's fiddle, an eighteenth-century instrument)

=== Anthologies – Various artists ===
- 1961 Songs of Seduction
- 1961 Jack of all Trades
- 1990s? The Donegal Fiddle (RTÉ CD – undated; John features on three tracks: #35, #36, #37)
- 1997 Traditional Dance music of Ireland (Saydisc Records – CD-SDL 420; John Doherty appears on 10 tracks: #2, #7, #8, #13, #14, #15, #23, #24, #27, #28; including a real rarity, a John Doherty polka, "The Dark Girl Dressed in Blue" (track #27))

== Documentaries ==
- 2012 John Doherty ar leirg na gaoithe Winner Torc Award Celtic Media Festival; "John Doherty ar leirg na gaoithe" produced by Éabhlóid

== Literature ==
- Mac Aoidh, Caoimhín (1994). Between the Jigs and the Reels. ISBN 1873437080.
