= Redmond Herrity =

Irish sculptor

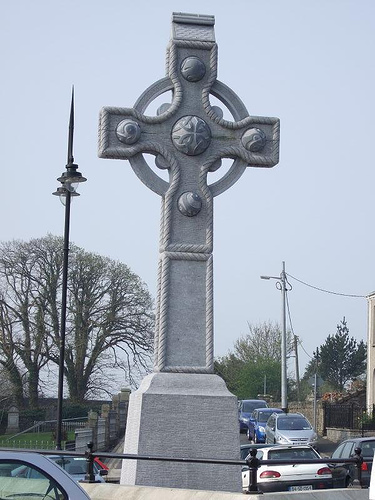
- Born: Letterkenny, County Donegal
- Occupation: Sculptor

Redmond Herrity (Irish: Réamann Ó hOireachtaigh) is an Irish sculptor from Letterkenny, County Donegal.

Redmond Herrity, who works from his home place of Letterkenny in County Donegal, Ireland, has traveled extensively, creating private and public commissions. During his time in India in the late 1990s, he was inspired by street sculptors and in a later trip to Australia worked with stone for the first time. He graduated from Leitrim Sculpture Centre in Ireland in 2001 and later worked in Carrara, Italy, where he began mastering the ancient techniques of marble portraiture. From classical portraits to modern sculpture, Redmond's work spans centuries. In 2014 Herrity worked on a series named "Recycled Limestone" that depicts recyclable items like a beer tin or a folded milk carton.

== Works on display ==
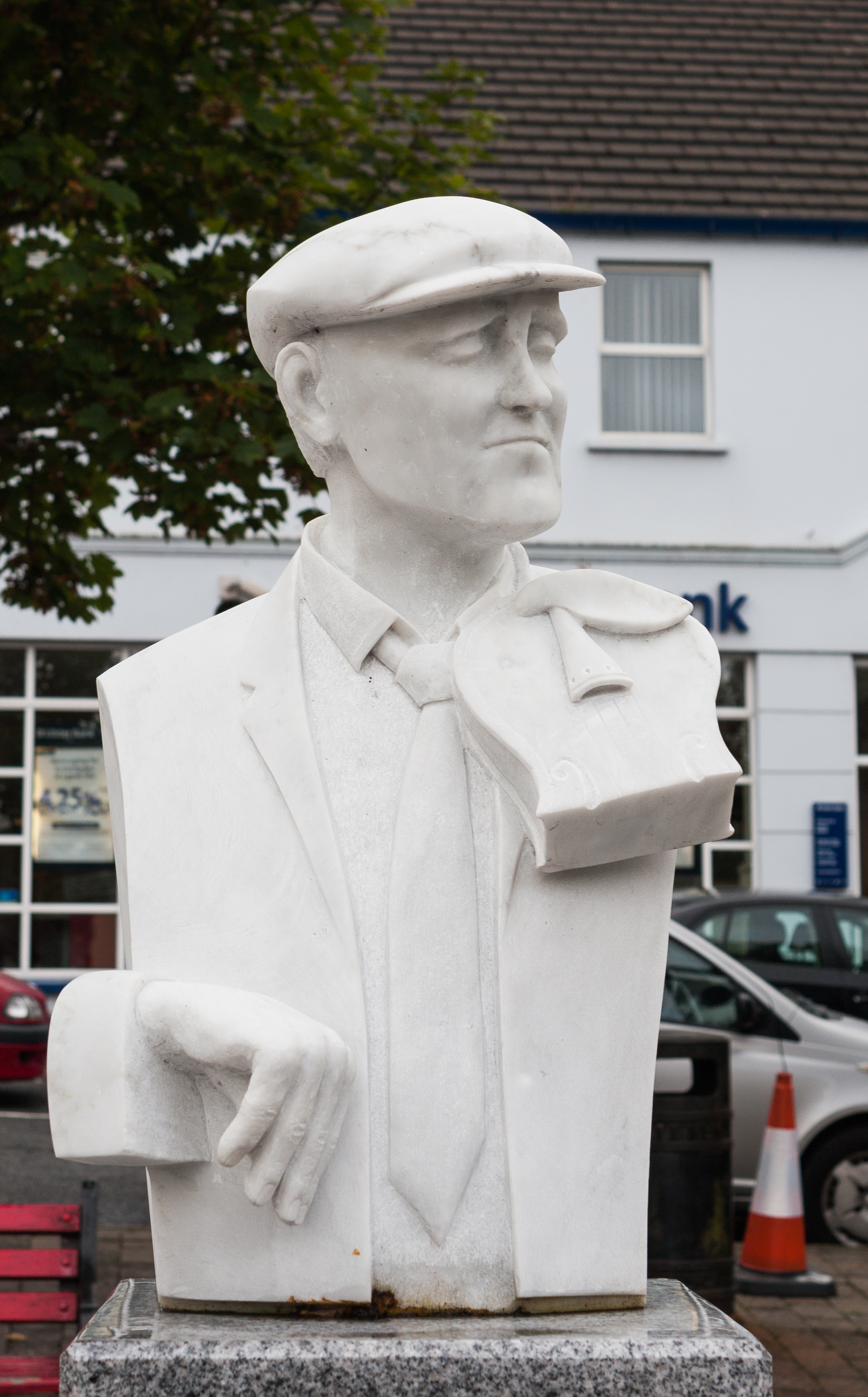
Sculpture of John Doherty at the Diamond in Ardara

His works include the Celtic Cross in Letterkenny. He came to the attention of the national media for his sculpture of Our Lady, which can be seen in St Mary's Church, Rasharkin, County Antrim. He also constructed the memorial to the Miami Showband which is located at the Hugh Lane Gallery on Parnell Square. He was thanked by former Taoiseach Bertie Ahern for this work.

- Celtic Cross (2006), Cathedral Square, Letterkenny, County Donegal
- Errigal College (2007), Letterkenny, County Donegal
- Flight of the Earls (2007), Letterkenny Town Park
- Miami Showband Memorial (2007), Parnell Square, Dublin
- Our Lady (2008), Rasharkin, County Antrim
- John Doherty (2013), Ardara, County Donegal
