= List of public art in County Donegal =

This is a list of public art on permanent public display in County Donegal, Ireland. The list applies only to works of public art accessible in a public space; it does not include artwork on display inside museums. Public art may include sculptures, statues, monuments, memorials, murals and mosaics.

== Letterkenny ==
Image	Title / subject	Location and coordinates	Date	Artist / designer	Type	Designation	Notes
	Polestar	Port Bridge Roundabout		Locky Morris			It is made of 104 timber poles and rises to a height of 12 metres. Its shape alludes to the outline of a boat, as well as having a locomotive theme.
	The Workers	Dry Arch Roundabout	2001	Maurice Harron			Commemorates those who worked on building the original bridge and train track at the Dry Arch.
	Celtic Cross	Cathedral Square	2006	Peadar McDaid, Redmond Herrity			The limestone cross was erected in 2006 to celebrate 2000 years since the birth of Jesus.
	Rabble Children	Market Square	1994	Maurice Harron			Hiring Fairs were held in Letterkenny in years gone by when children between the ages of 11 and 16 were sold for periods of six months to wealthy farmers of the Lagan Valley.
	Fireman's Helmet	Letterkenny Fire Station					This project is a government funded effort to educate and train Travellers in the dying skills of their culture in a modern world, through culture and art.
	The Chairs	Market Square	2005				Constructed from wood it is typically yellow in colour, with various etchings worked into the overall design.
	Blacksmiths' Ball	Letterkenny Courthouse	1991				It was constructed by 100 blacksmiths on Saturday 30 March 1991.
