= County Donegal =

County in Ireland

County Donegal Contae Dhún na nGall (Irish) Coontie Dunnygal (Ulster-Scots) Tyrconnell
- County
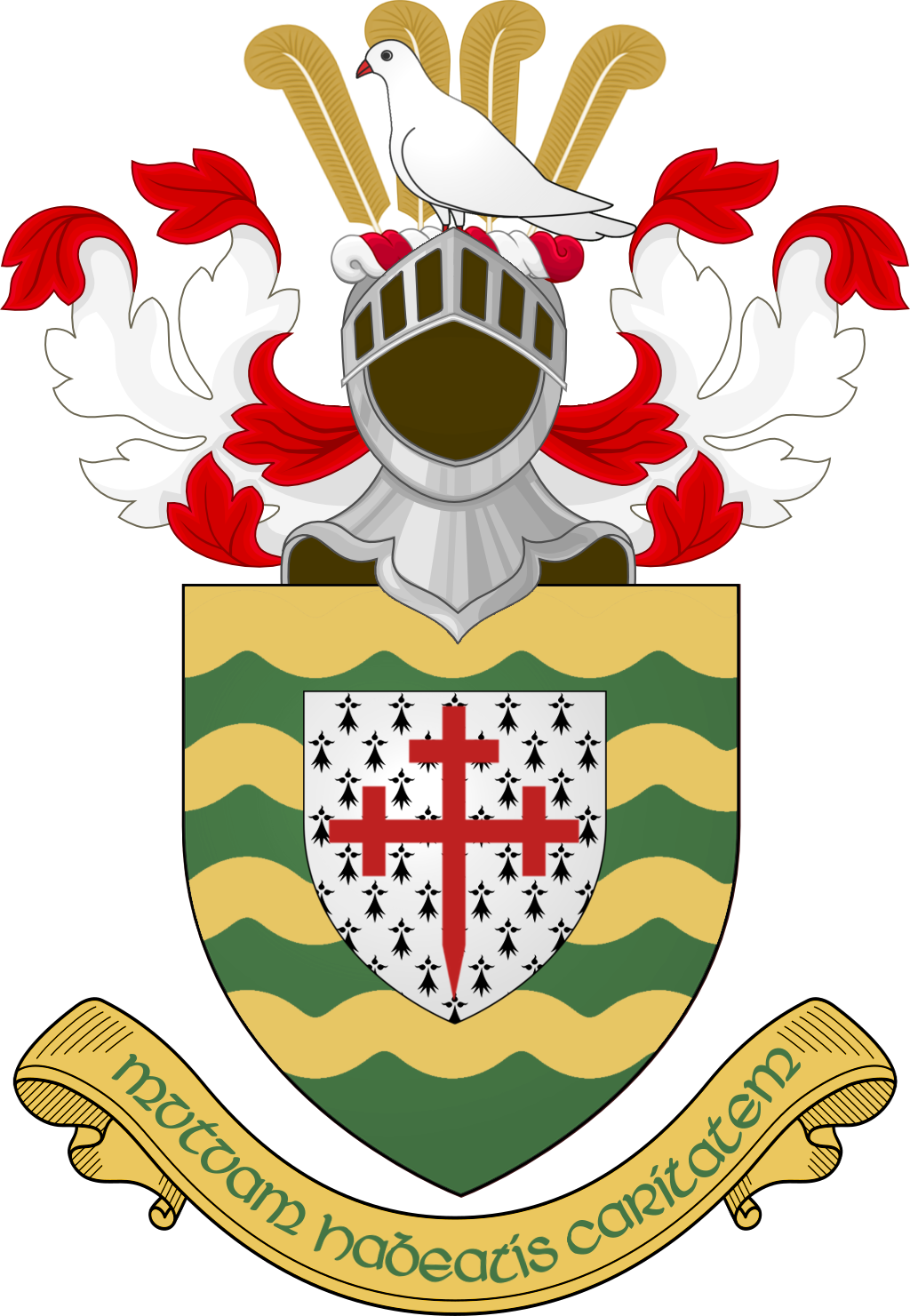
- Coat of arms
- Nickname: The Forgotten County
- Motto: Mutuam habeatis caritatem "Have love for one another"
- Location in Ireland, indicated in darker green
- Interactive map of County Donegal
- Coordinates: 54.92°N 8.00°W
- Country: Ireland
- Province: Ulster
- Region: Northern and Western
- Established: 1585
- County town: Lifford
- Largest settlement: Letterkenny

Government
  - Local authority: Donegal County Council
  - Dáil constituency: Donegal; Sligo–Leitrim
  - EP constituency: Midlands–North-West

Area
  - Total: 4,860 km^{2} (1,880 sq mi)
  - Rank: 4th
- Highest elevation (Errigal): 751 m (2,464 ft)

Population (2022)
  - Total: 167,084
  - Rank: 13th
  - Density: 34.4/km^{2} (89.0/sq mi)
- Time zone: UTC±0 (WET)
  - Summer (DST): UTC+1 (IST)
- Eircode routing keys: F92, F93, F94
- Telephone area codes: 074 (primarily)
- ISO 3166 code: IE-DL
- Vehicle index mark code: DL
- Website: www.donegal.ie
- Coontie Dunnygal is an Ulster Scots spelling.

County Donegal (/ˌdʌnɪˈɡɔːl, ˌdɒnɪˈɡɔːl/ DUN-ig-AWL, DON-ig-AWL; Irish: Contae Dhún na nGall) is a county in the Republic of Ireland. It is in the province of Ulster and is the northernmost county on the island of Ireland. The county mostly borders Northern Ireland, sharing only a small border with one county of the rest of the Republic; its nickname is "The Forgotten County".

The county, the fourth-largest, is named after the town of Donegal in the south, although Lifford is the county town. It has also been known as County Tyrconnell or Tirconaill (Tír Chonaill), after the historical territory on which, along with Inishowen, it was based. Its territory hosted one of the most powerful families of late Gaelic Ireland, the O'Donnells. Donegal County Council is the local council. The population was 167,084 at the 2022 census.

Donegal is home to a Gaeltacht community, notably including Gweedore, and contains centres of traditional cultural activity; it is the home county of Clannad and Enya. Mountains and cliffs feature, and the county has one of the longest coastlines on the island of Ireland.

== Name ==
County Donegal is named after the town of Donegal (from Irish Dún na nGall 'fort of the foreigners') in the south of the county.

It has also been known by the alternative name County Tyrconnell or Tirconaill (Tír Chonaill, which means 'Land of Conall'). This is in reference to the túath or Gaelic kingdom of Tír Chonaill (on which the county was based) and the earldom that succeeded it. Donegal County Council was officially known as Tirconaill County Council between 1920 and 1927, but the legality of the name change was dubious and the Irish Free State used both names for the county interchangeably. There was also considerable backlash in Inishowen, which was not within the historic territory of Tirconaill, with some proposing for it to be recognised as a separate county. At a County Council meeting in October 1927, it was unanimously agreed to retain the name Donegal, with the council's secretary declaring that the county had never been legally renamed to Tirconaill.

== History ==
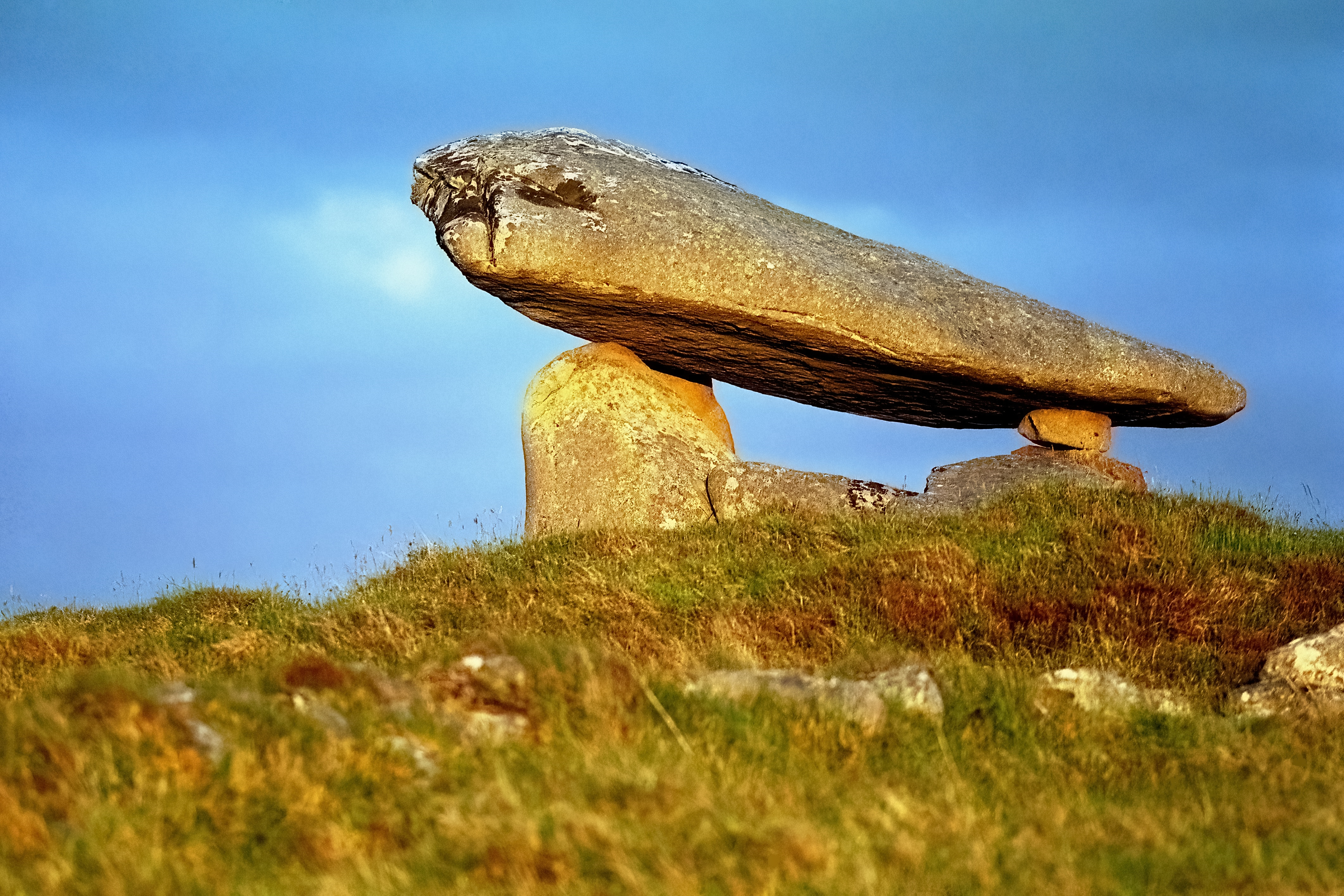
Neolithic portal tomb at Kilclooney More

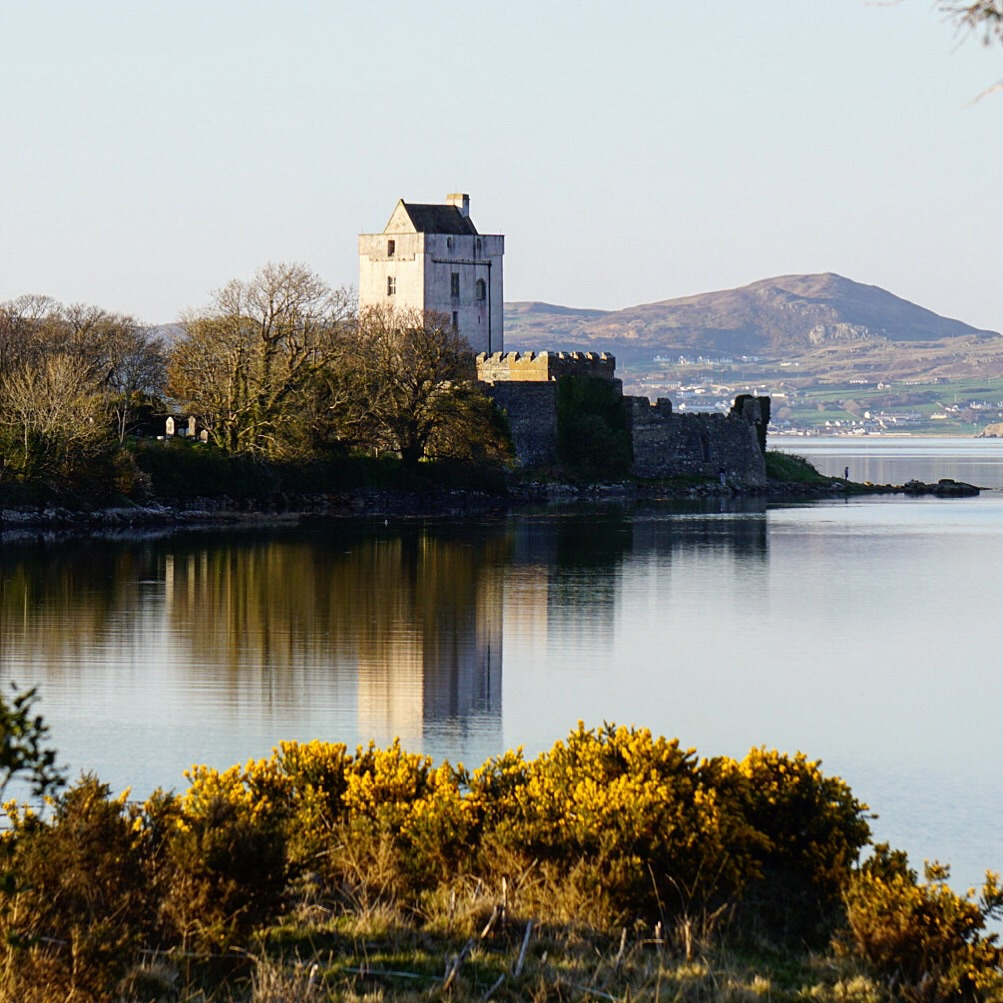
Doe Castle, home of the Sweeney clan

County Donegal was the home of the once-mighty Clann Dálaigh, whose best-known branch was the Clann Ó Domhnaill, better known in English as the O'Donnell dynasty. Until around 1600, the O'Donnells were one of Ireland's richest and most powerful native Irish ruling families. Within Ulster, only the Uí Néill (known in English as the O'Neills) of Tír Eoghain (Tirowen or modern Tyrone) were more powerful. The O'Donnells were Ulster's second most powerful clan or ruling family from the early 13th century through to the start of the 17th century. For several centuries, the O'Donnells ruled Tír Chonaill (Tyrconnell), a túath or Gaelic kingdom in west Ulster that covered almost all of modern County Donegal. The head of the O'Donnell family had the titles An Ó Domhnaill (meaning The O'Donnell in English) and Rí Thír Chonaill (meaning King of Tír Chonaill in English). Based at Donegal Castle in Dún na nGall (modern Donegal Town), the O'Donnell Kings of Tír Chonaill were traditionally inaugurated, from the 1460s onwards, at Doon Rock near Kilmacrennan. The O'Donnells' royal or chiefly power was finally ended in what was then the newly created County Donegal in September 1607, following the Flight of the Earls from Portnamurray, near Rathmullan. The modern County Arms of County Donegal (dating from the early 1970s) was influenced by the design of the old O'Donnell royal arms. The County Arms is the official coat of arms of both County Donegal and Donegal County Council.

The modern County Donegal was made a shire by order of the English Crown in 1585. The English authorities at Dublin Castle formed the new county by amalgamating the old Kingdom of Tír Chonaill with the old Lordship of Inishowen. Although detachments of the Royal Irish Army were stationed there, the Dublin authorities were unable to establish control over Tír Chonaill and Inishowen until after the Battle of Kinsale in 1602. Full control over the new County Donegall was only achieved after the Flight of the Earls in September 1607. It was the centre of O'Doherty's Rebellion of 1608, with the key Battle of Kilmacrennan taking place there. The county was one of those 'planted' during the Plantation of Ulster from around 1610 onwards. What became the City of Derry was officially part of County Donegal up until 1610.

County Donegal was one of the worst-affected parts of Ulster during the Great Famine of the late 1840s in Ireland. Vast swathes of the county were devastated, with many areas becoming permanently depopulated. Vast numbers of County Donegal's people emigrated at this time, chiefly through Foyle Port.

During the Irish Civil War (1922–1923), Donegal played a strategic role due to its proximity to Northern Ireland, where anti-Treaty forces often sought refuge and resupplied. The county's rugged landscape, including areas like Dunlewey, provided ideal terrain for guerrilla operations and hiding arms caches. Local communities were divided in their loyalties, with some supporting anti-Treaty forces by offering shelter and supplies, while Free state forces carried out raids to suppress resistance.

The Ballymanus mine disaster occurred on 10 May 1943 on a beach at Ballymanus, County Donegal, when local villagers attempted to bring ashore an unexploded marine mine. Eighteen men and boys between the ages of 13 and 34 were killed in the explosion.

=== Effects of partition ===
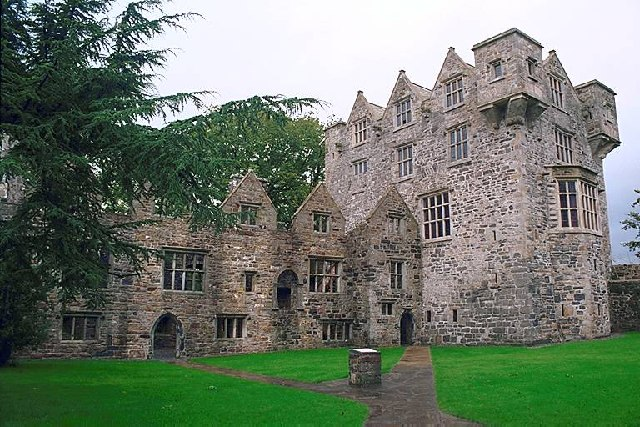
Donegal Castle, former seat of the O'Donnell dynasty

The partition of Ireland in the early 1920s severely affected County Donegal. Partition cut the county off, economically and administratively, from Derry, which had acted for centuries as the county's main port, transport hub, and financial centre. Derry, together with west Tyrone, was henceforward in a new, different jurisdiction which remained within the United Kingdom, officially called Northern Ireland. Partition also meant that County Donegal was now almost entirely cut off from the rest of the jurisdiction in which it now found itself, the new dominion called the Irish Free State (later called Ireland from 1937). The county is physically connected to the rest of the Republic of Ireland by an internal border of only a few kilometres. The existence of a border cutting County Donegal off from its natural hinterlands in Derry City and West Tyrone greatly exacerbated the economic difficulties of the county after partition. The county's economy is particularly susceptible, like that of Derry City, to the currency fluctuations of the euro against sterling.

Added to all this, in the late 20th century, County Donegal was adversely affected by The Troubles in Northern Ireland. The county suffered several bombings and assassinations. In June 1987, Constable Samuel McClean, a Donegal man who was a serving member of the Royal Ulster Constabulary (RUC), was shot dead by the Provisional Irish Republican Army (Provisional IRA) at his family home near Drumkeen. In May 1991, the prominent Sinn Féin politician Councillor Eddie Fullerton was assassinated by the Provisional IRA's opponent, the Ulster Defence Association (UDA), at his home in Buncrana. This added further to the economic and social difficulties of the county, although the greater economic and administrative integration with Northern Ireland following the Good Friday Agreement of April 1998 has been of benefit to the county.

Donegal has been labelled the "forgotten county" by its own politicians, owing to the perception that it is ignored by the government, even in times of crisis.

== Geography and subdivisions ==
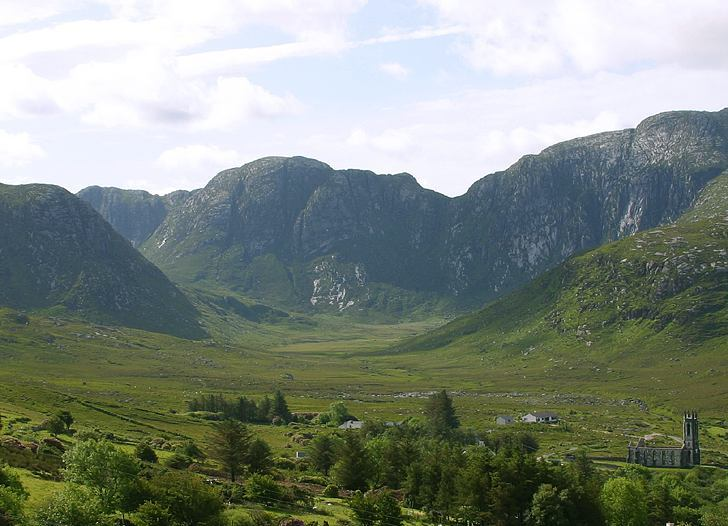
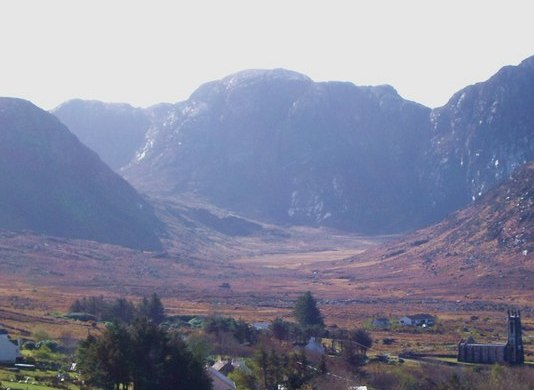
The appearance of parts of County Donegal's landscape can vary from lush green in the summer to orange-brown in the winter

Located in the northwest corner of Ireland, Donegal is the island's northernmost county. In terms of size and area, it is the largest county in Ulster and the fourth-largest county in all of Ireland. Uniquely, County Donegal shares a small border with only one other county in the Republic of Ireland – County Leitrim. The vast majority of its land border (93%) is shared with three counties of Northern Ireland: County Tyrone, County Londonderry, and County Fermanagh. This geographic isolation from the rest of the Republic has led to Donegal people maintaining a distinct cultural identity and has been used to market the county with the slogan "Up here it's different". While Lifford is the county town, Letterkenny is by far the largest town in the county with a population of just under 20,000. Letterkenny and the nearby city of Derry form the main economic axis in the northwest of Ireland. Indeed, what became the City of Derry was officially part of County Donegal up until 1610. It is part of the Northern and Western Region (a NUTS 2 European statistical Region), within which it is part of the Border strategic planning area.

=== Baronies and townlands ===
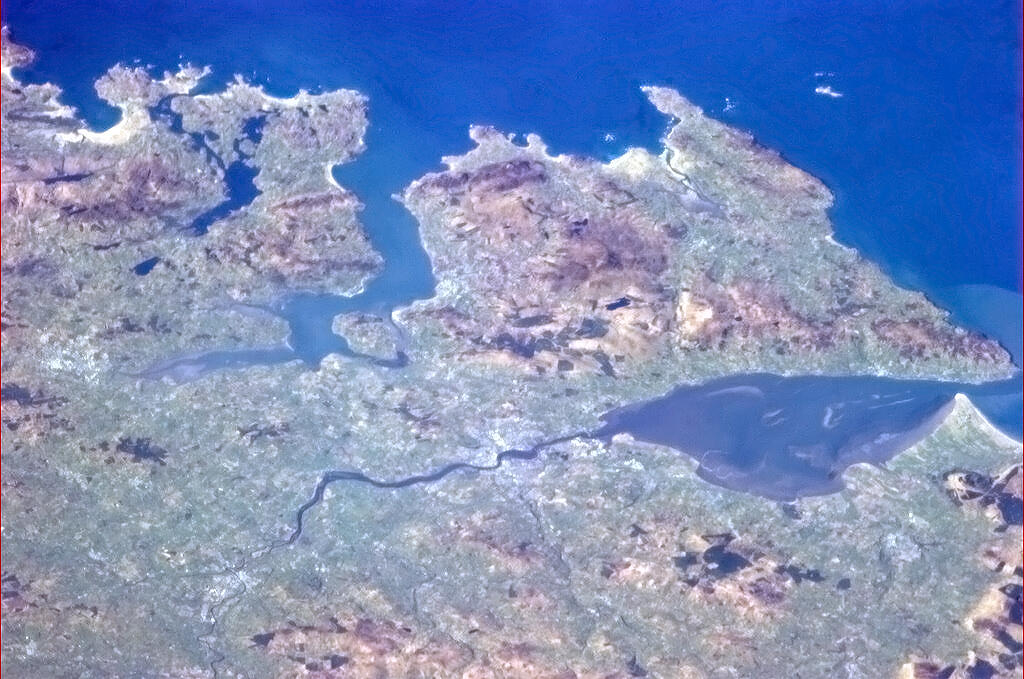
The Inishowen Peninsula as seen from the International Space Station

There are eight historic baronies in the county. While baronies continue to be officially defined units, they ceased to have any administrative function following the Local Government Act 1898, and any changes to county boundaries after the mid-19th century are not reflected in their extent. The last boundary change of a barony in Donegal was in 1851, when the barony of Inishowen was divided into Inishowen East and Inishowen West. The barony of Kilmacrennan covers a large portion of northwest Donegal and is the largest in the county. With an area of 312,410 acres (1,264 km^{2}), Kilmacrennan is also the largest barony in Ireland, being roughly equal in size to County Monaghan. The smallest barony is Inishowen West, at 77,149 acres (312.21 km^{2}).

Historic baronies of County Donegal
Barony	Irish name	Area (acres)
Banagh	Báinigh	179,090
Boylagh	Baollaigh	157,429
Inishowen East	Inis Eoghain Thoir	124,325
Inishowen West	Inis Eoghain Thiar	77,149
Kilmacrennan	Cill Mhic Réanáin	312,410
Raphoe North	Ráth Bhoth Thuaidh	80,388
Raphoe South	Ráth Bhoth Theas	141,308
Tirhugh	Tír Aodha	128,602

Townlands are the smallest officially defined geographical divisions in Ireland. There are 2,787 townlands in Donegal and an additional 47 historic town boundaries. These town boundaries are registered as their own townlands and are much larger than rural townlands. The smallest rural townlands in Donegal are just 1 acre in size, most of which are either lough islands or offshore islets (Corragh Island, Bishop's Island, Juniper Island, O'Donnell's Island, etc.). The largest rural townland in Donegal is 6,053 acres (Tawnawully Mountains). The average size of a townland in the county (excluding towns) is 438 acres.

=== Informal districts ===
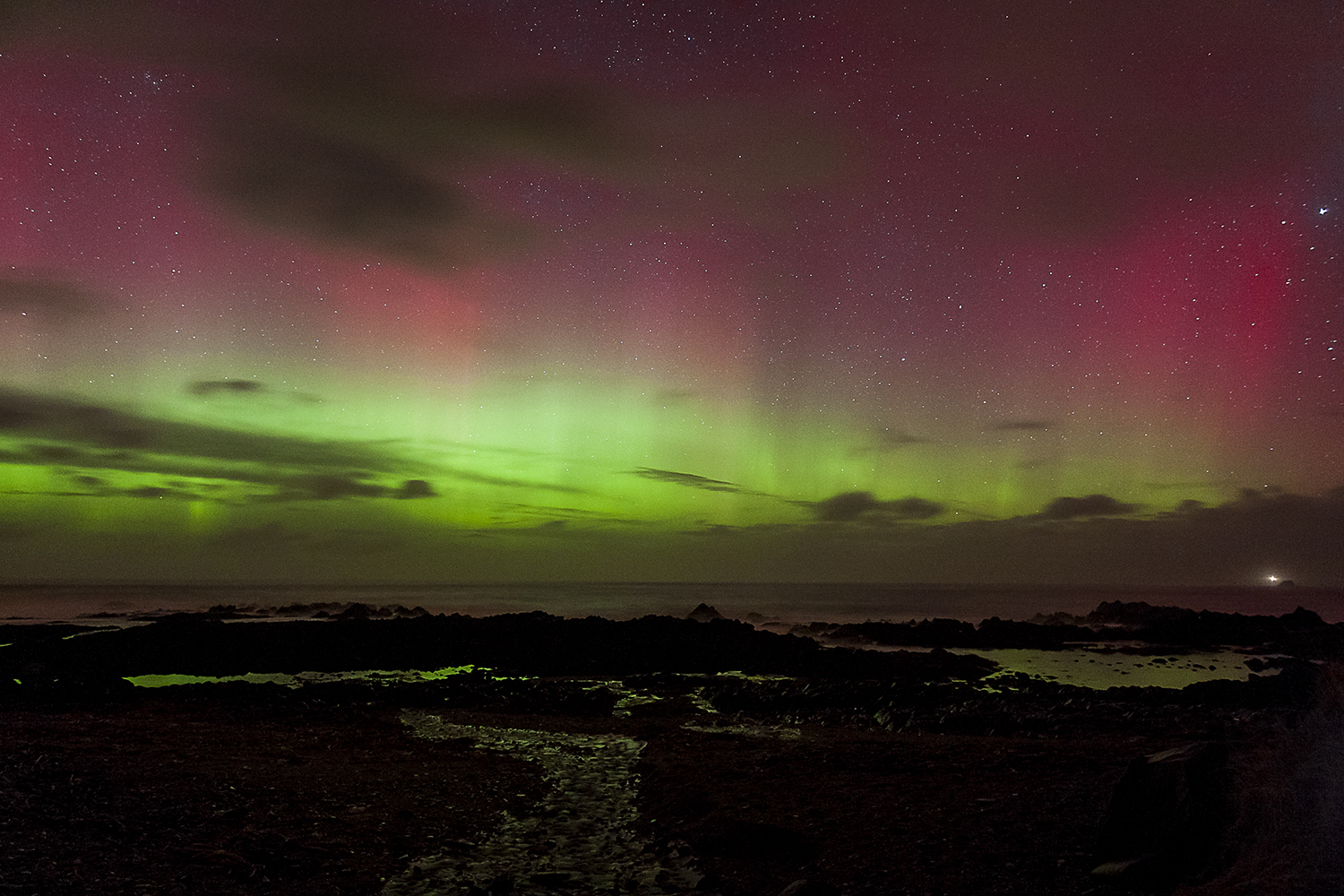
Aurora borealis (na Saighneáin) over Malin Head

The county may be informally divided into a number of traditional districts. There are two Gaeltacht districts in the west: The Rosses (Irish: Na Rosa), centred on the town of Dungloe (Irish: An Clochán Liath), and Gweedore (Irish: Gaoth Dobhair). Another Gaeltacht district is located in the north-west: Cloughaneely (Irish: Cloich Chionnaola), centred on the town of Falcarragh (Irish: An Fál Carrach). The most northerly part of the island of Ireland is the location for three peninsulas: Inishowen, Fanad, and Rosguill. The main population centre of Inishowen, Ireland's largest peninsula, is Buncrana. In the east of the county lies the Finn Valley (centred on Ballybofey) and The Laggan district (not to be confused with the Lagan Valley in the south of County Antrim), which is centred on the town of Raphoe.

=== Geography ===
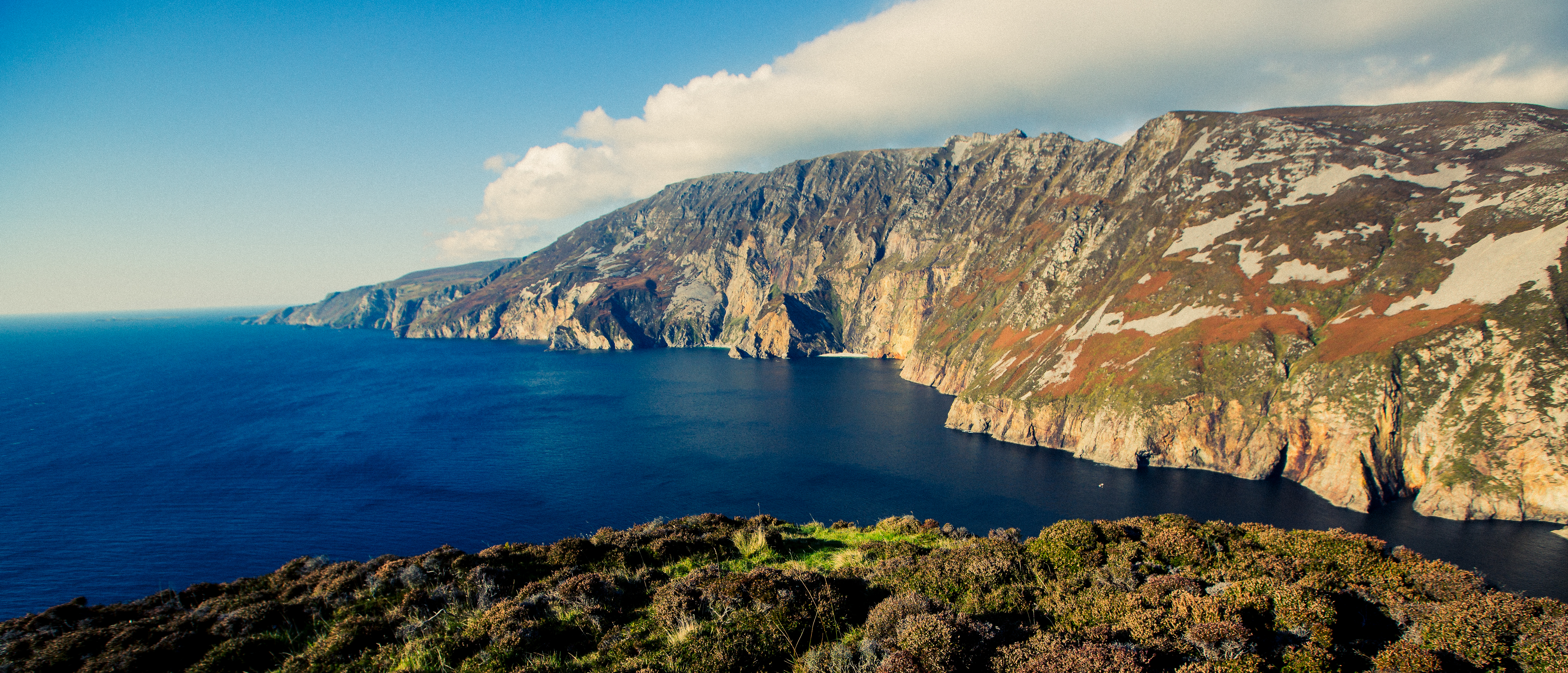
Slieve League cliffs, the second tallest in Ireland

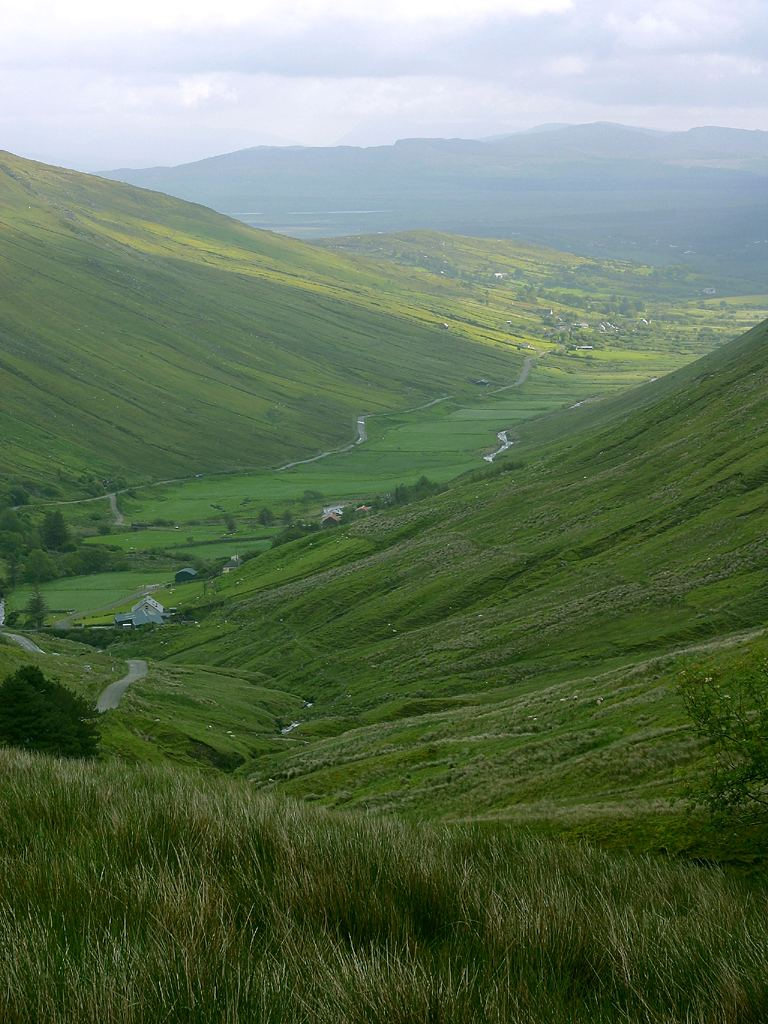
Glengesh Pass, near Ardara

Donegal is the most mountainous county in Ulster. It consists of two ranges of low mountains, the Derryveagh Mountains in the north and the Blue Stack Mountains in the south, with Errigal at 751 m (2,464 ft) the highest peak, making it the 11th-highest county top in Ireland. It has a deeply indented coastline forming natural sea loughs, of which Lough Swilly and Lough Foyle are the most notable. Donegal boasts the longest mainland coastline of any county in Ireland, and has either the longest or third longest total coastline (including islands), depending on how it is measured. Estimates of the length of the coastline range from less than 1,000 km (621 mi) to 1,235 km (767 mi). The official figure used by Donegal County Council is 1,134 km (705 mi). The Slieve League cliffs are among the highest sea cliffs in Europe, while Malin Head is the most northerly point on the island of Ireland.

Two permanently inhabited islands, Arranmore and Tory Island, lie off the coast, along with a large number of islands with only transient inhabitants. The 129 km long River Erne, Ireland's ninth-longest river, enters Donegal Bay near the town of Ballyshannon. The River Erne, along with other Donegal waterways, has been dammed to produce hydroelectric power. A canal linking the Erne to the River Shannon was constructed between 1846 and 1860, creating Ireland's longest navigable waterway. The project was plagued with setbacks and closed in 1870, ten years after its completion. A joint effort between the Irish and Northern Irish governments restored the canal in the late 20th century, and the Shannon–Erne Waterway reopened in 1994.

Historically, the eastern boundary of the kingdom of Tír Chonaill was demarcated by the River Foyle. In the 17th century, an area of land west of the Foyle was transferred to the newly established city of Derry. The Foyle still demarcated a large section of Donegal's eastern border. To the south, the Drowes River forms a 9 km (6 miles) long natural boundary with County Leitrim.

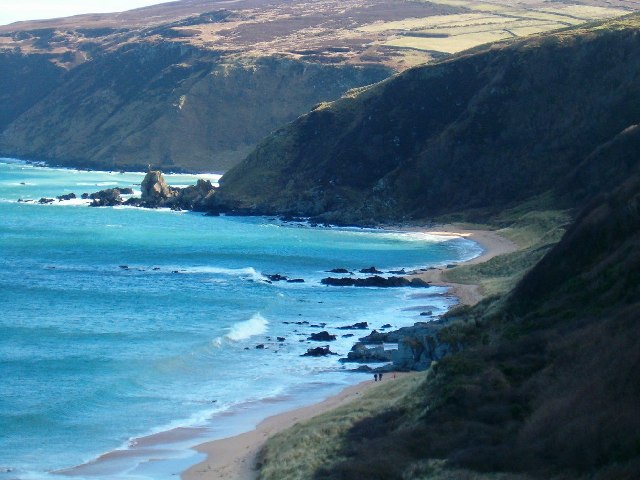
Kinnagoe Bay

Donegal has a population density of 34.2 people per square kilometre, the lowest in Ulster and the fifth lowest in Ireland. The county has an expansive network of wildlife and conservation zones, including 46 European Union designated Special Areas of Conservation (SACs) and 26 Special Protection Areas (SPAs), as well as 14 Natural Heritage Areas (NHAs), 74 proposed Natural Heritage Areas, 145 Irish Geological Heritage Areas (IGHs) and Ireland's second largest national park, Glenveagh, which extends to over 42,000 acres (170 km^{2}) in northwestern Donegal.

Owing to its scenic landscape and "world-class wilderness", Donegal was named National Geographic's "Coolest place on the Planet" in 2017. The county was also ranked the 4th best region in the world by Lonely Planet's Best in Travel series for 2024, which called Donegal "purely wild with a big heart".

The forested area in the county extends to 55,534 ha (137,228 acres), the 4th highest total forest cover in Ireland. Historic deforestation left Donegal devoid of forest cover by 1900. Much of the county's forests are commercial timber plantations, which were initially established in the 1930s as a way to create rural employment in areas with poor agricultural land and high rates of emigration. The county contains extensive tracts of blanket bog which are concentrated in western and upland regions. Blanket bog covers an area of 148,656 ha (367,337 acres), or roughly 30 percent of the entire county.

=== Geology and terrain ===
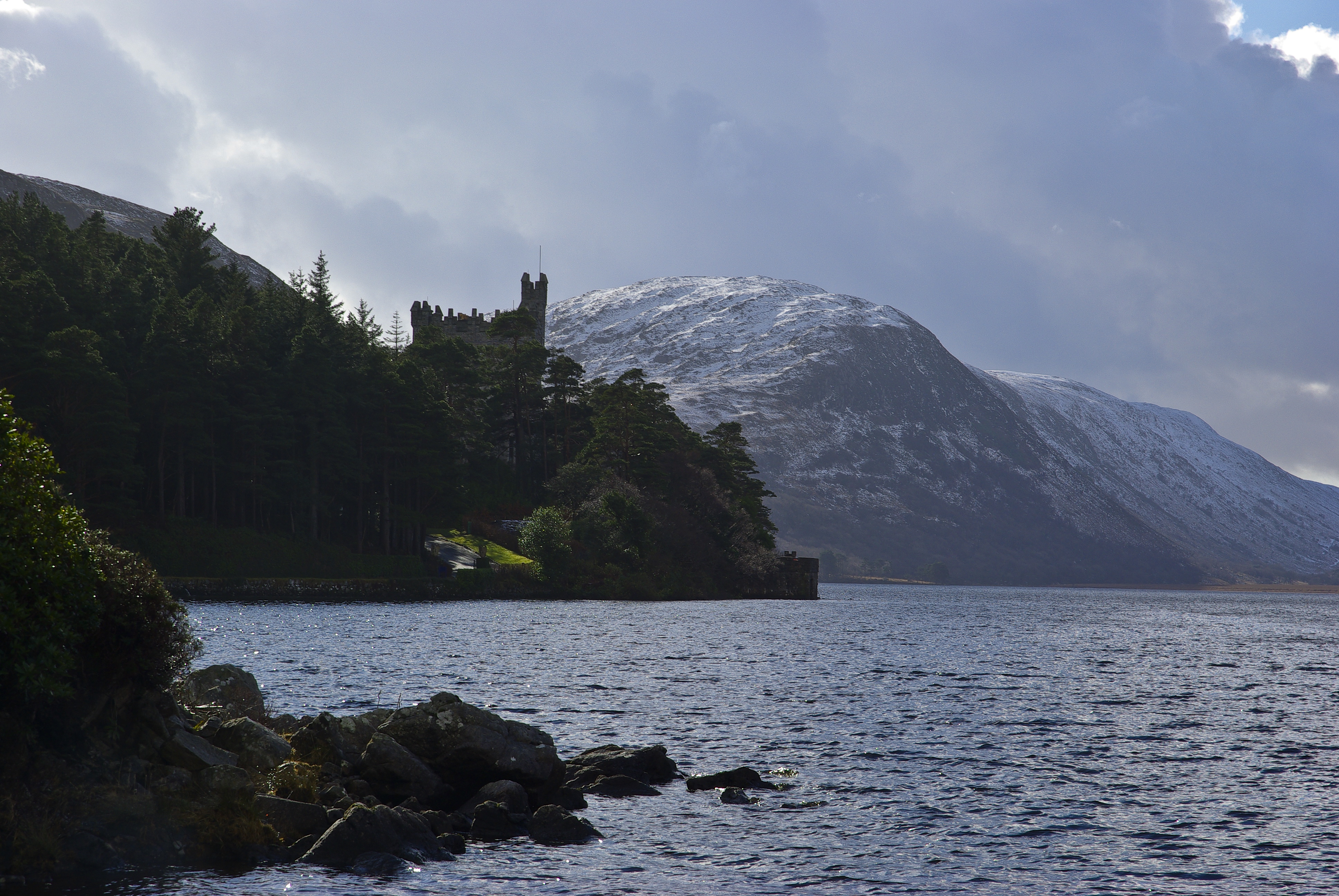
Glenveagh Valley

Donegal can be divided into six main geological subdivisions. Of these, the most expansive sections are the Lower Carboniferous limestones and sandstones of south Donegal, the Devonian granite of the Donegal batholith, which extends for about 75 km northeast to southwest from Ardara to Fanad Head, and quartzo-feldspathic Dalradian rocks from the Precambrian era, which cover much of the rest of the county. The geology of Donegal is very similar to that of County Mayo, and both counties are located within the Grampian Terrane. The oldest rocks in Ireland are a granitic gneiss found on the island of Inishtrahull, located ca. 10 km (6.2 mi) north-east of Malin Head. They are 1.78 billion years old, making them Paleoproterozoic in age. The oldest rocks on mainland Donegal are a quartzo-feldspathic paragneiss found around Lough Derg, which have been dated to 1.713 billion years ago.

Donegal is the most seismically active part of Ireland. The Leenan Fault is a large strike-slip fault that bisects the county from Lough Swilly to Donegal Bay, and dozens of tremors have been recorded along the fault since the late 19th century, although none have been larger than a magnitude 3 on the Richter scale.

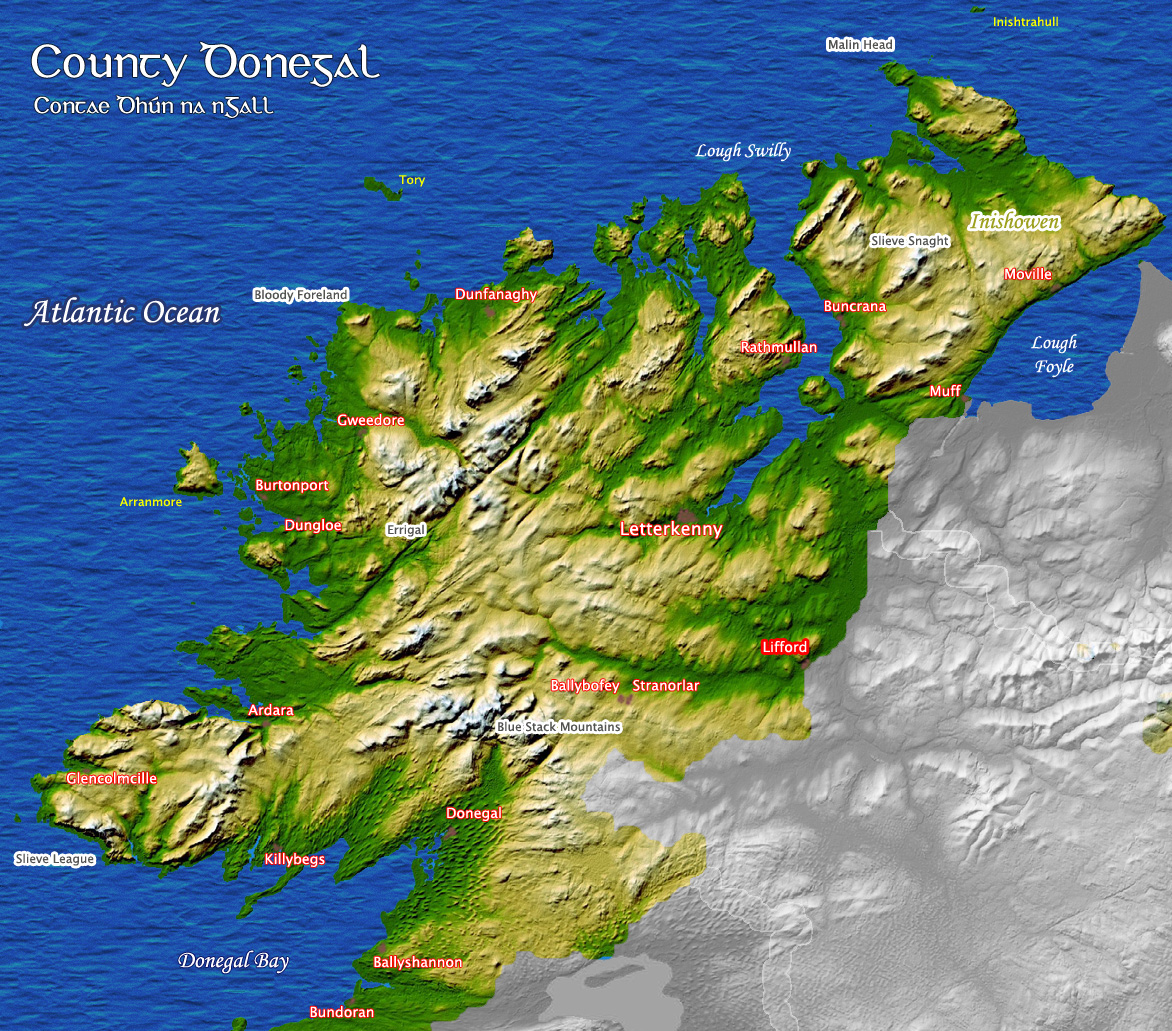
Topographic map of County Donegal

The county's landscape was carved out by glaciation at the end of the Pleistocene and the subsequent retreat during the early Holocene. Donegal contains one of Ireland's three glacial fjords (or fjards) at Lough Swilly, the others being Carlingford Lough and Killary Harbour. Lough Swilly is the county's largest inlet, and forms the western boundary of the Inishowen Peninsula. The thick ice sheet that once covered the region carved out deep basins in the Donegal uplands and many tarns or corrie lakes developed in these depressions after the ice had melted, including Lough Maam below Slieve Snaght and Lough Feeane under Aghla More. Larger glacial lakes formed in the county's distinctive U-shaped valleys, such as Lough Beagh and Gartan Lough in Glenveagh, and Dunlewey Lough and Lough Nacung Upper in the Poisoned Glen. Valleys such as these were the last areas to retain glaciers as temperatures rose.

As the ice sheet thinned, topography became the dominant force driving the direction of ice and meltwater flow. Erosion by glacial meltwater carved out large channels in southern Donegal, which directed water and sediment to outwash fans in Donegal Bay. The area south of Donegal town, where the River Eske flows into the bay, is an example of one of these outwash areas. Sea levels in the area began to stabilise around 5,000 years ago, and the balance of erosion and deposition along Donegal's coastline resulted in the development of many sandy beaches and spits interspersed with jagged sea cliffs.

In his 1937 memoir The Way That I Went, the Irish naturalist Robert Lloyd Praeger wrote of Donegal as his favoured county in Ireland for walking in, noting:

...Donegal comes first. I choose it because there is nowhere else where the beauties of hill and dale, lake and rock, sea and bog, pasture and tillage, are so intimately and closely interwoven, so that every turn of the road opens new prospects, and every hill-crest fresh combinations of these delightful elements.

=== Flora and fauna ===
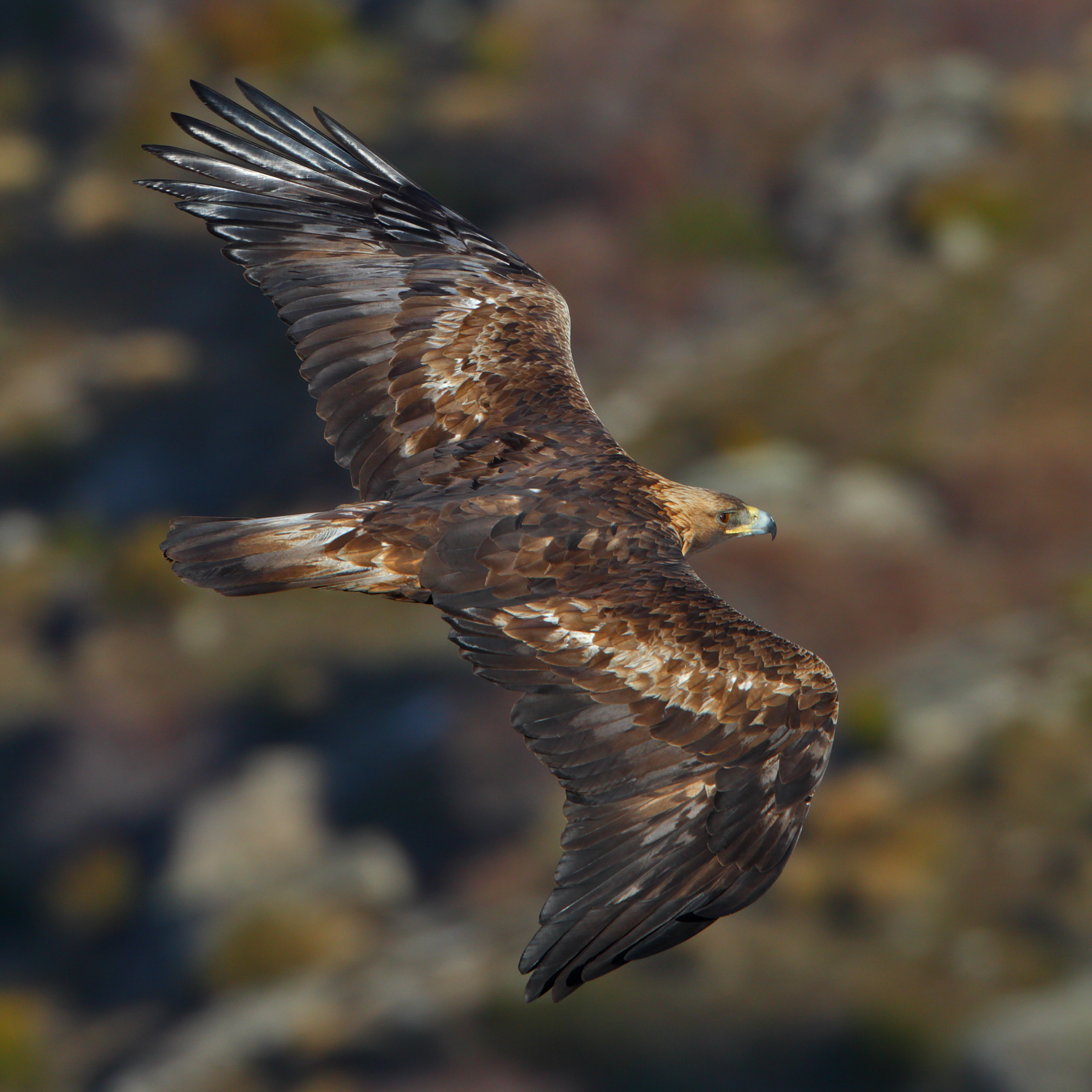
Golden eagle (Aquila chrysaetos)

Donegal has a wide variety of habitats, and over half of Ireland's plant and animal species can be found within the county. Approximately 11.4 per cent of the county is covered in forest, which is about average nationally. Forest cover is not evenly spread across the county, and some areas, such as Pettigo and around Lough Derg, are very heavily forested, while more exposed coastal and upland areas are virtually barren. Around 65 per cent of Donegal's forests are publicly owned.

- The typical native tree species found in Donegal are aspen, birch, hazel, oak, and rowan. Other commonly planted trees include Scots pine, Sitka spruce, sycamore, European larch and horse-chestnut.
- Many species of terrestrial and flying mammals live in the county, including Irish hares, brown hares, red deer, sika deer, Irish bats, common pipistrelle bats, soprano pipistrelle bats, brown long-eared bats, whiskered bats, Daubenton's bats, Natterer's bats, American mink, pygmy shrews, rabbits, pine martens, stoats, badgers, red squirrels, gray squirrels, wood mice, house mice, brown rats, otters, red foxes, hedgehogs and feral goats.
- Marine mammals include harbour seals, grey seals, humpback whales, orcas, pilot whales, fin whales, minke whales, sperm whales, Cuvier's beaked whales, common dolphins, bottlenose dolphins, Atlantic white-sided dolphins, white-beaked dolphins, striped dolphins, Risso's dolphins and (very rarely) walruses.
- Notable bird species include barnacle geese, corn crakes, northern lapwings (Ireland's national bird), grey herons, Long-eared owls, golden eagles, barn owls, yellowhammers, storm petrels, Arctic skuas, wrens, goldfinches, Atlantic puffins, razorbills, ravens, curlews and redshanks.

Despite its northerly latitude and geographic isolation, Donegal also hosts two species of amphibian (common frog & smooth newt) and two reptile species (Leatherback turtle and viviparous lizard).

The native Irish red deer in Donegal went extinct around 1860 and was reintroduced in the 1890s. Due to interbreeding, most of the deer in the county are now a Sika-Red deer hybrid. The Wild Ireland wildlife park near Burnfoot showcases some of Donegal's historic animal species that were hunted to extinction, including brown bears, lynx, and wolves. In 2001, the golden eagle was re-introduced into Glenveagh National Park and is currently Ireland's only breeding population.

A survey of the macroscopic marine algae of County Donegal was published in 2003. The survey was compiled using the algal records held in the herbaria of the following institutions: the Ulster Museum, Belfast; Trinity College Dublin; NUI Galway, and the Natural History Museum, London. Records of flowering plants include Dactylorhiza purpurella (Stephenson and Stephenson) Soó.

=== Climate ===
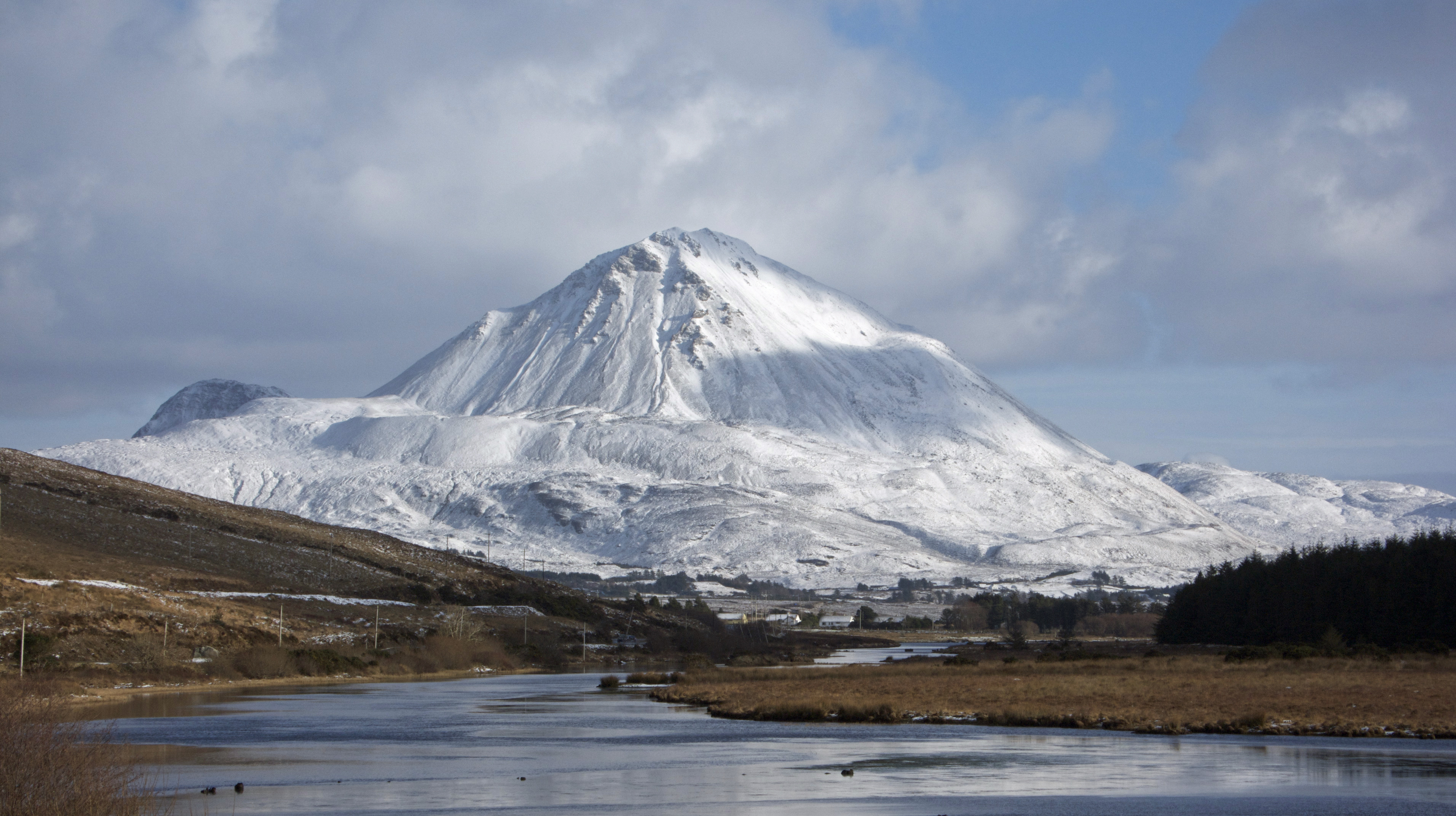
Snow atop Errigal

The majority of Donegal has a temperate oceanic climate (Köppen climate classification: Cfb), with upland areas in the Derryveagh and Blue Stack ranges classified as oceanic subpolar (Köppen climate classification: Cfc). The county's climate is heavily influenced by the North Atlantic Current. Due to the topography of western Donegal, it receives orographic rainfall, where the air is forced to rise on contact with its mountainous coastline and subsequently cools and condenses, forming clouds. The mountains of Donegal are among the cloudiest places in Ireland, and northern Donegal is the windiest. Irish monthly record wind speeds for March, June, July, September, November, and December have all been set at Malin Head. The highest wind speed ever recorded in Donegal was 181 km/h (112 mph) on 16 September 1961, during Hurricane Debbie.

The Atlantic Ocean has a significant cooling effect and, due to the county's long, thin shape and punctuated coastline, nowhere in Donegal is particularly far from the ocean, giving it a generally cooler climate that is more similar to western Scotland than the rest of Ireland. The average maximum temperature in July at Malin Head is just 16.8 °C (62 °F). However, due to its exposed coastal location, the climate at Malin Head is not representative of most of the county. Winds are much lighter in the county's interior, and temperatures are cooler in the winter and warmer in the summer. Annual rainfall in the county ranges from around 850 mm (33 in) in the lowlands of north-eastern Donegal to over 2,000 mm (79 in) in western mountainous areas. Precipitation exceeding 1 mm (0.04 in) will fall across all areas of Donegal on over 150 days per year.

While the prevailing wind direction in Ireland is south-westerly, which brings warm, moist air from the Gulf of Mexico, a low-pressure Polar front regularly passes to the northwest of the island, bringing cold and unsettled weather to the region. The upland areas of Donegal will reliably receive some covering of snow every year. In lowland areas, snow - while still relatively infrequent - is more common than in the rest of Ireland. Despite its coastal location, Malin Head records an average of 20 days of snowfall per year. In contrast, Valentia Island, a similarly placed coastal station in the southwest of Ireland, records just 3.

== Demographics ==
Historical population
Year	Pop.	±%
1600	7,889	—
1610	5,778	−26.8%
1659	12,001	+107.7%
1821	120,559	+904.6%
1831	141,845	+17.7%
1841	296,448	+109.0%
1851	255,158	−13.9%
1861	237,395	−7.0%
1871	218,334	−8.0%
1881	206,035	−5.6%
1891	185,635	−9.9%
1901	173,722	−6.4%
1911	168,537	−3.0%
1926	152,508	−9.5%
1936	142,310	−6.7%
1946	136,317	−4.2%
1951	131,530	−3.5%
1956	122,059	−7.2%
1961	113,842	−6.7%
1966	108,549	−4.6%
1971	108,344	−0.2%
1979	121,941	+12.5%
1981	125,112	+2.6%
1986	129,664	+3.6%
1991	128,117	−1.2%
1996	129,994	+1.5%
2002	137,575	+5.8%
2006	147,264	+7.0%
2011	161,137	+9.4%
2016	159,192	−1.2%
2022	167,084	+5.0%

=== Largest towns ===
Letterkenny is by far the largest settlement in Donegal, with a population of just over 22,000. It is the largest town in the Border Region and the 21st largest urban area in the Republic of Ireland.

Under CSO classification, an "Urban Area" is a town with a population greater than 1,500. As of the 2016 Census, Donegal is the most rural / least urbanised county in Ireland, with less than one-third of the population (27.3 per cent) living in urban areas and over 70 per cent in rural areas.

1. Letterkenny, 22,549
2. Buncrana, 6,971
3. Ballybofey/Stranorlar, 5,406
4. Carndonagh, 2,768
5. Donegal, 2,749
6. Bundoran, 2,599
7. Ballyshannon, 2,246
8. Convoy, 1,702
9. Lifford, 1,613
10. Muff, 1,418

=== Irish language ===
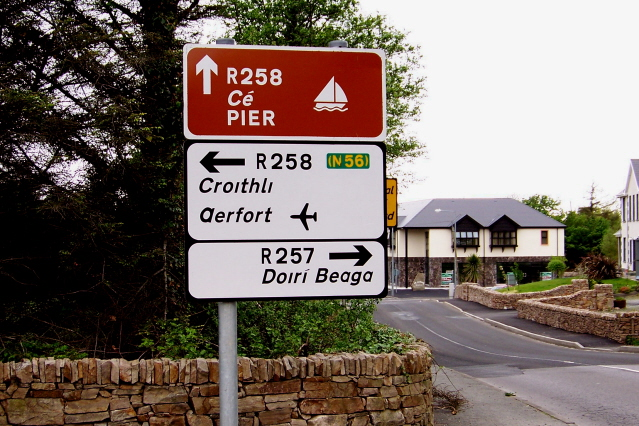
Road signs in Irish in the Gweedore Gaeltacht

The Donegal Gaeltacht (Irish-speaking area) is the second-largest in Ireland. The version of the Irish language spoken in County Donegal is Ulster Irish.

Of the Gaeltacht population of 24,744 (16% of the county's total population), 17,132 say they can speak Irish. There are three Irish-speaking parishes: Gweedore, The Rosses and Cloughaneely. Other Irish-speaking areas include Gaeltacht an Láir: Glencolmcille, Fintown, Fanad and Rosguill, the islands of Arranmore, Tory Island and Inishbofin. Gweedore is the largest Irish-speaking parish, with over 5,000 inhabitants. All schools in the region use Irish as the language of instruction.

According to the 2022 Census, the number of people (aged three and over) who stated that they could speak Irish in Donegal was 59,130 (35.4% of the county's total population) compared with 56,738 in 2016. Of these 7,750 said they spoke Irish daily while 4,533 spoke Irish weekly.

== Government and politics ==
=== Local government ===
Donegal County Council has been in existence since 1899 and has responsibility for local administration. It is headquartered at the County House in Lifford. Elections to the County Council take place every five years. Thirty-seven councillors are elected using the system of proportional representation by means of the single transferable vote (STV). The county is divided into the following local electoral areas: Buncrana (5 seats), Carndonagh (4), Donegal (6), Glenties (6), Letterkenny (7), Lifford–Stranorlar (6) and Milford (3).

Donegal County Council has three representatives on the Northern and Western Regional Assembly.

Council elections are held every 5 years, with the next election due to be held in June 2029. The 2024 Donegal local election had a voter turnout of 54.7%. The highest turnout was at Milford (63.1%) and the lowest was at Letterkenny (51.4%).

Results of the 2024 Donegal County Council election
Party	Seats	FPv%	% Change since 2019	Seat Change since 2019
Fianna Fáil	10	22.8%	▼6.6%	▼2
Sinn Féin	10	21.9%	▲2.5%	Steady
100% Redress	4	9.7%	New	New
Fine Gael	3	10.5%	▼8.0%	▼3
Labour	1	2.0%	▼0.7%	Steady
Independent	9	28.5%	▲2.3%	▲1

=== Former districts ===
Until 2014, there were town councils in Letterkenny, Bundoran, Ballyshannon, and Buncrana. The town councils were abolished in June 2014 when provisions of the Local Government Reform Act 2014 was commenced and their functions were taken over by Donegal County Council.

=== National elections ===
The Dáil constituency of Donegal (Dáil constituency) (5 TDs) covers almost the entire county, with the exception of a small area in southern Donegal around Bundoran and Ballyshannon, which is part of the Sligo–Leitrim constituency.

Historically, the county was represented in the Parliament of Ireland through the Donegal Borough constituency, which lasted from 1613 to 1800, when the Irish Parliament was abolished. Following the Act of Union, the county was represented in Westminster through the County Donegal constituency until 1885. Following this, the county was broken up into four separate constituencies – North Donegal, South Donegal, East Donegal and West Donegal – which persisted until independence. The Government of Ireland Act 1920 reformed the four constituencies into a single entity covering "the administrative county of Donegal". This was broken up into Donegal East and Donegal West from 1937 to 1977, and into Donegal North-East and Donegal South-West from 1981 to 2016.

Donegal's current representatives (2024 General Election)

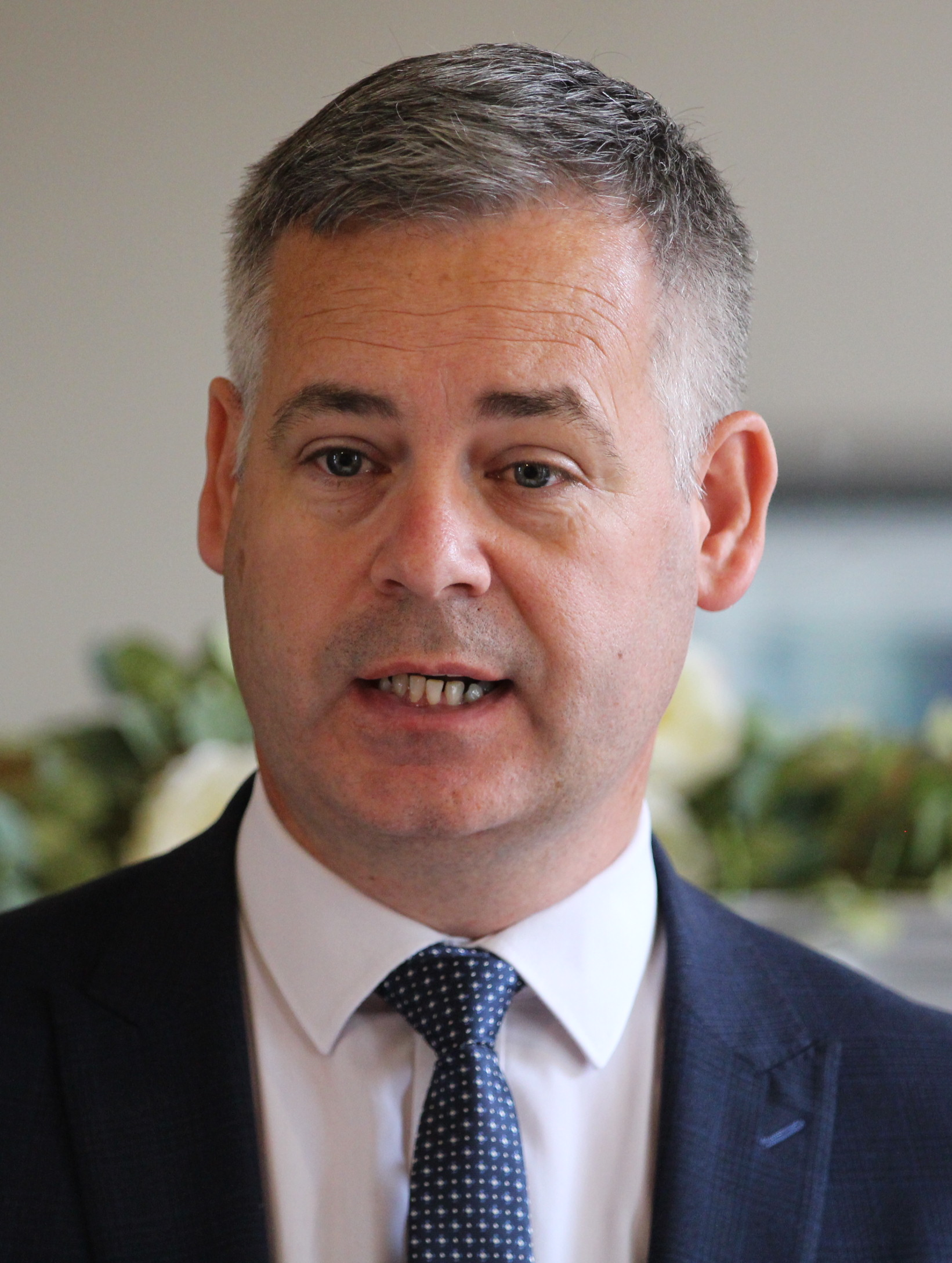
Pearse Doherty,
Sinn Féin

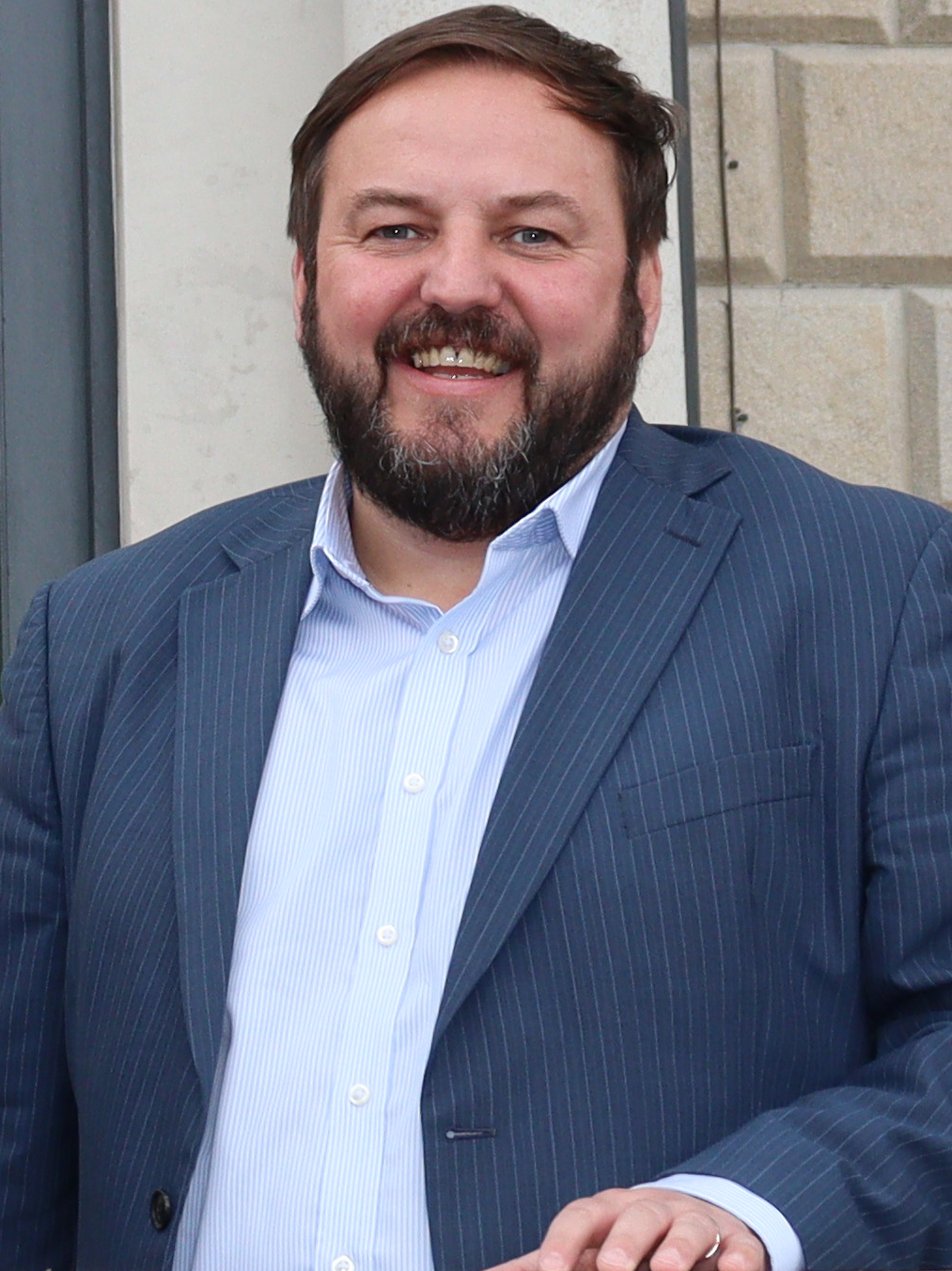
Pádraig Mac Lochlainn,
Sinn Féin

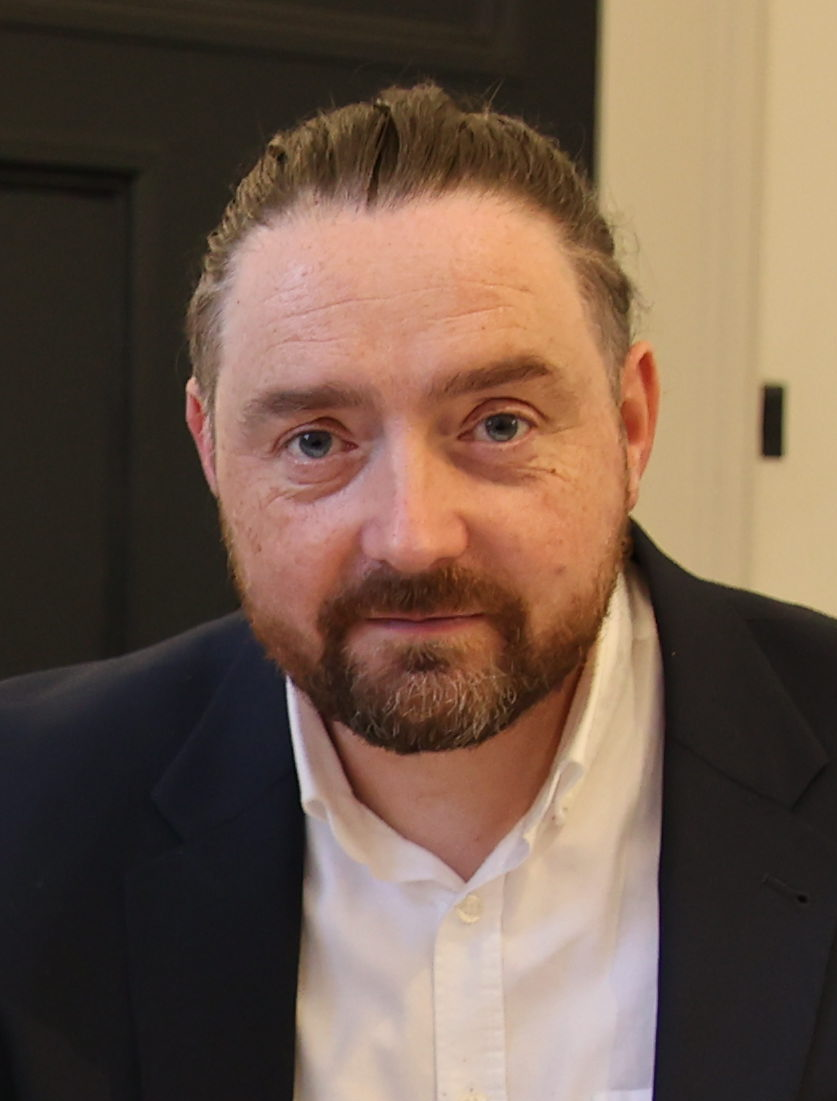
Charles Ward,
100% Redress

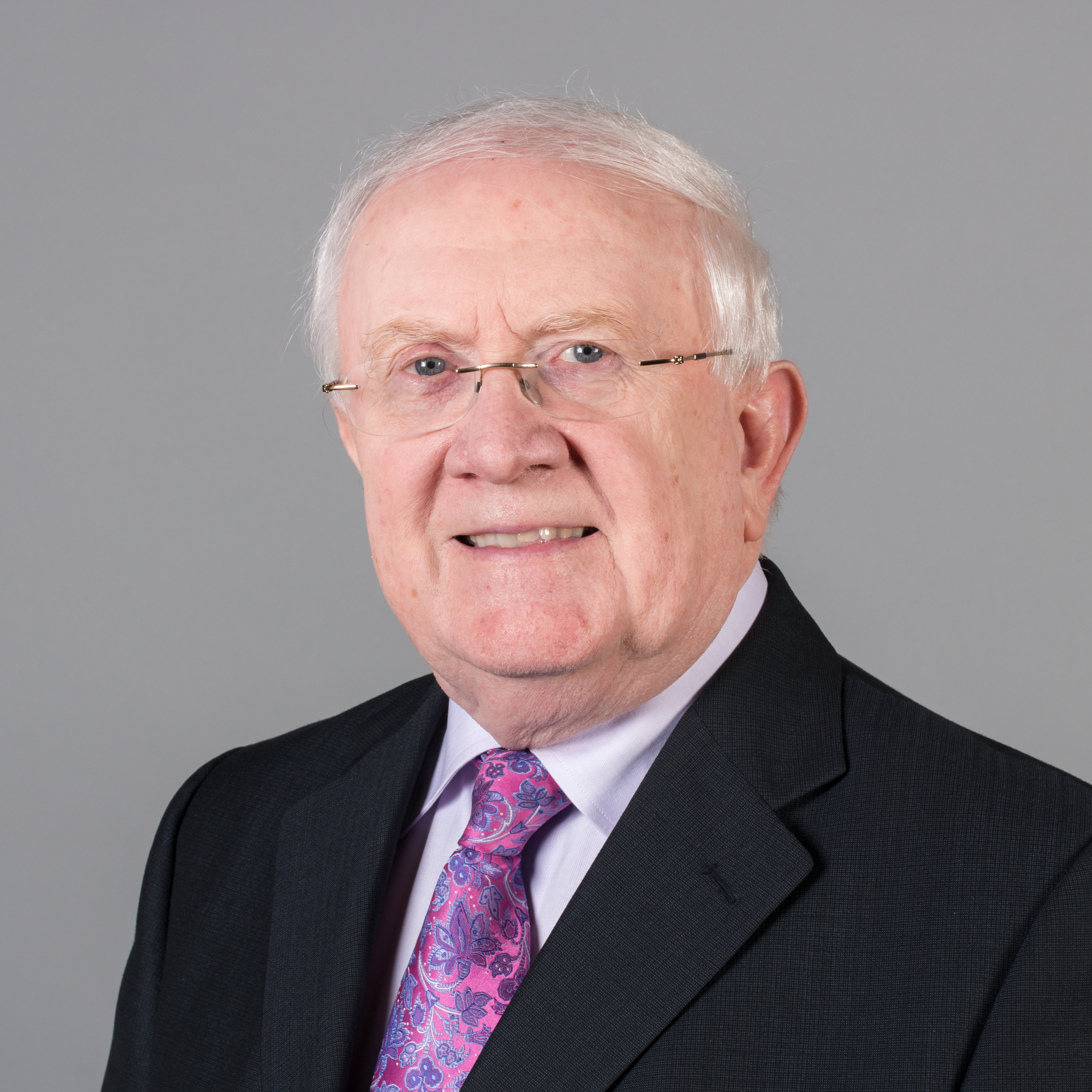
Pat "the Cope" Gallagher,
Fianna Fáil

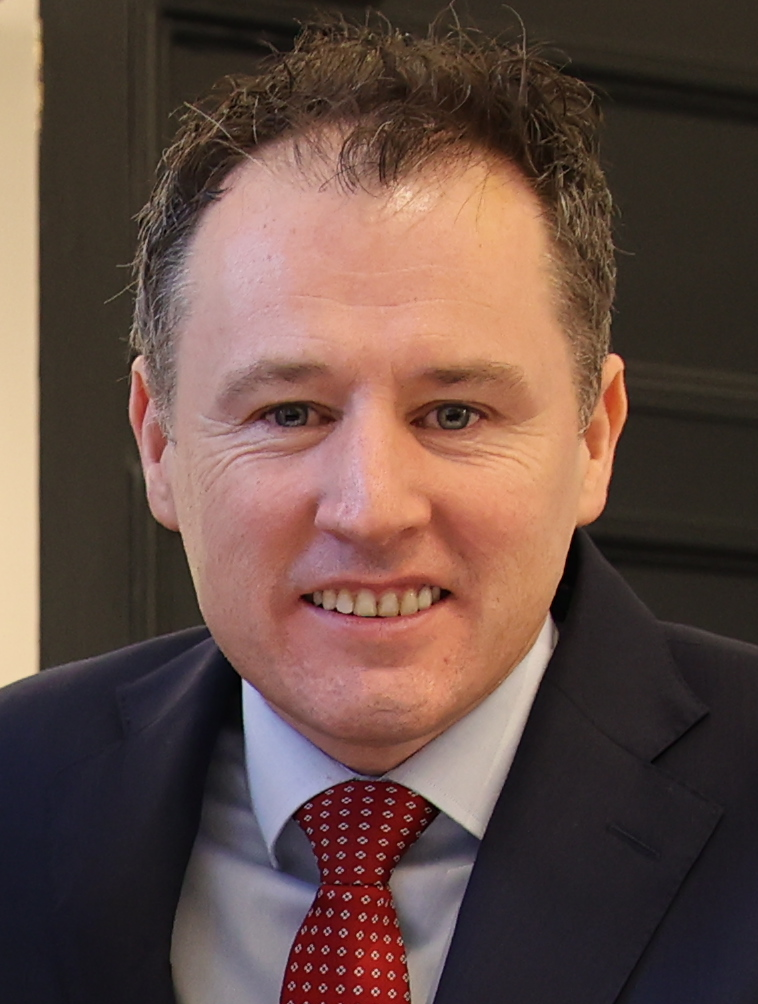
Charlie McConalogue,
Fianna Fáil

=== Referendums ===
Outlier Votes in Referendums
Proposal	Donegal Result	National Result
3 (1958)	61.2% Yes	51.8% No
3 (1968)	51.4% Yes	60.8% No
4 (1968)	51.2% Yes	60.8% No
13 (1992)	60.1% No	62.4% Yes
14 (1992)	58.4% No	59.9% Yes
15 (1995)	59.3% No	50.3% Yes
25 (2002)	68.8% Yes	50.4% No
28 (2009)	50.8% No	67.1% Yes
30 (2012)	55.3% No	60.4% Yes
31 (2012)	58.0% No	58.0% Yes
36 (2018)	51.9% No	66.4% Yes

Donegal voters have a reputation nationally for being "conservative and contrarian", and have often voted against amendments to the Irish constitution which received broad support in the rest of Ireland. Conversely, voters in the county have also supported several referendums which were not enacted. The trend first emerged in 1958, when voters in Donegal overwhelmingly voted to alter the electoral system from proportional representation to first-past-the-post in a referendum which was defeated nationally.

In 1968, voters in the county backed two separate bills, which were also widely rejected nationwide. The first vote was to allow rural constituencies to elect a disproportionate number of TDs. Thirty-four constituencies voted against the amendment, and four voted in favour, two of which were Donegal North-East and Donegal South-West. In the second vote, both Donegal constituencies again voted for the introduction of a first-past-the-post system, which was rejected.

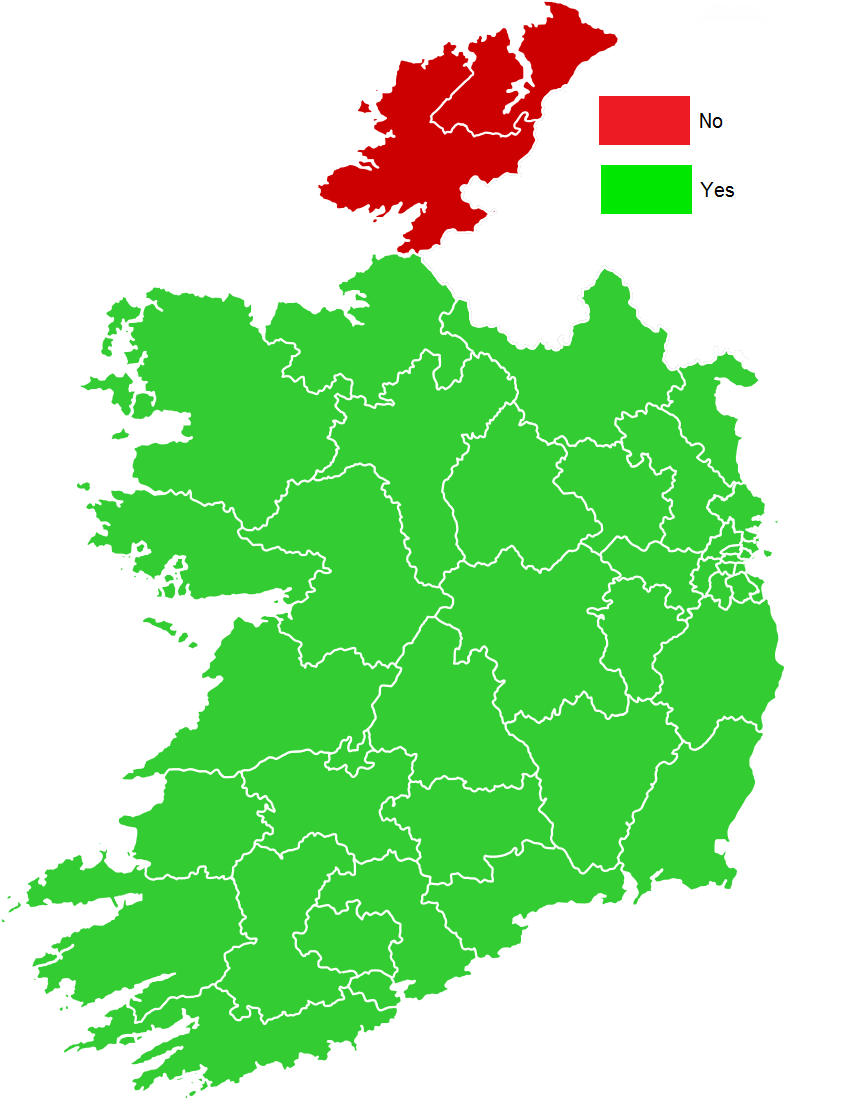
Second referendum on the Treaty of Lisbon

The 23rd Amendment permitting the State to join the International Criminal Court in 2001 received the lowest support in Donegal, with just 55.8% of voters backing the proposal, compared with 64.2% nationally. Donegal is the only county to have voted against the Treaty of Lisbon twice, in 2008 and 2009. Voters in the county also rejected both the Fiscal Treaty and the referendum on children's rights and state care in 2012.

On the issue of abortion and right to life vs pro-choice, Donegal has consistently been the most conservative county in Ireland. In 1992, two referendums on the issue were held. The first was an amendment that specified that the State could not limit the freedom of travel of women seeking abortions abroad. The second specified that the distribution of information about abortion services available in other countries was not unlawful. In contrast to the rest of Ireland, Donegal voted decisively against these amendments.

The twenty-fifth amendment in 2002 to tighten the ban on abortion in Ireland received the most support in Donegal. Nationally, 50.42% of voters voted against the amendment, whereas 68.8% of voters in Donegal voted in favour of it. In May 2018, Donegal was the only county in Ireland to vote against the repeal of the Eighth Amendment of the Constitution which had acknowledged the right to life of the unborn. In October 2018, 48.5% of voters in Donegal voted against repealing the offence of publishing or uttering blasphemous matter, the highest of any county and significantly above the national total of 35.15%.

In the 2024 constitutional referendums, Donegal had the highest votes for "no" in the country, where 80% voted "no" to family and 84% voted "no" to care.

=== European elections ===
The county is in the Midlands–North-West constituency (5 seats) for elections to the European Parliament. Two candidates from Donegal contested the 2024 European Parliament election in Ireland. They were Peter Casey and Senator Niall Blaney.

== Freedom of Donegal ==
The Freedom of Donegal is an award that is given to people who have been recognised for outstanding achievements on behalf of the people and County Donegal. Such people include Daniel O'Donnell, Phil Coulter, Shay Given, Packie Bonner, Paddy Crerand, Seamus Coleman, the Brennan family and Jim McGuinness. In 2009 the members of the 28th Infantry Battalion of the Irish Defence Forces were also awarded the Freedom of the County from Donegal County Council "in recognition of their longstanding service to the County of Donegal".

== Transport ==
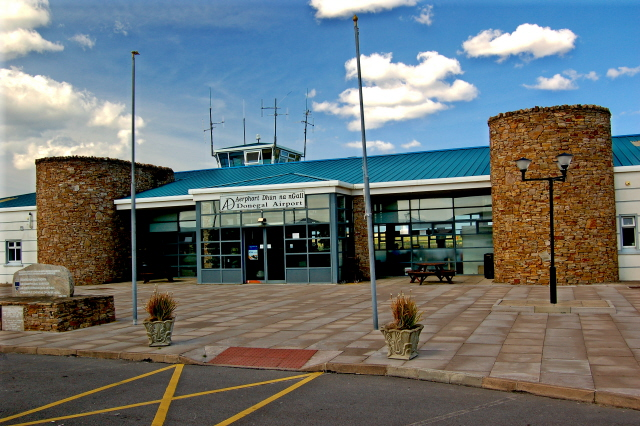
Donegal Airport, which is located in The Rosses region

An extensive rail network used to exist throughout the county and was mainly operated by the County Donegal Railways Joint Committee and the Londonderry and Lough Swilly Railway Company (known as the L. & L.S.R. or the Lough Swilly Company for short). All these lines were laid to a 3-foot gauge, while the connecting lines were all laid to the Irish standard gauge of 1,600 mm (5 ft 3 in). This meant that all goods had to be transshipped at Derry and Strabane. Like all narrow gauge railways, this became a handicap after World War I, when road transport began to erode the railways' goods traffic.

By 1953, the Lough Swilly had closed its entire railway system and become a bus and road haulage concern. County Donegal lasted until 1960, as it had largely dieselised its passenger trains by 1951. By the late 1950s, major work was required to upgrade the track, and the Irish Government was unwilling to supply the necessary funds, so 'the Wee Donegal', as it was affectionately known, was closed in 1960. The Great Northern Railway (the G.N.R.) also ran a line from Strabane through The Laggan, a district in the east of the county, along the River Foyle into Derry. However, the railway network within County Donegal was completely closed by 1960. Today, the closest railway station to the county is Waterside Station in the City of Derry, which is operated by NI Railways (N.I.R.). Train services along the Belfast–Derry railway line run, via Coleraine railway station, to Belfast Lanyon Place and Belfast Grand Central stations.

County Donegal is served by both Donegal Airport, located at Carrickfinn in The Rosses in the west of the county, and by City of Derry Airport, located at Eglinton to the east. The nearest main international airport to the county is Belfast International Airport (popularly known as Aldergrove Airport), which is located to the east at Aldergrove, near Antrim Town, in County Antrim, 92 km (57 mi) from Derry City and 127 km (79 mi) from Letterkenny.

== Culture and religion ==
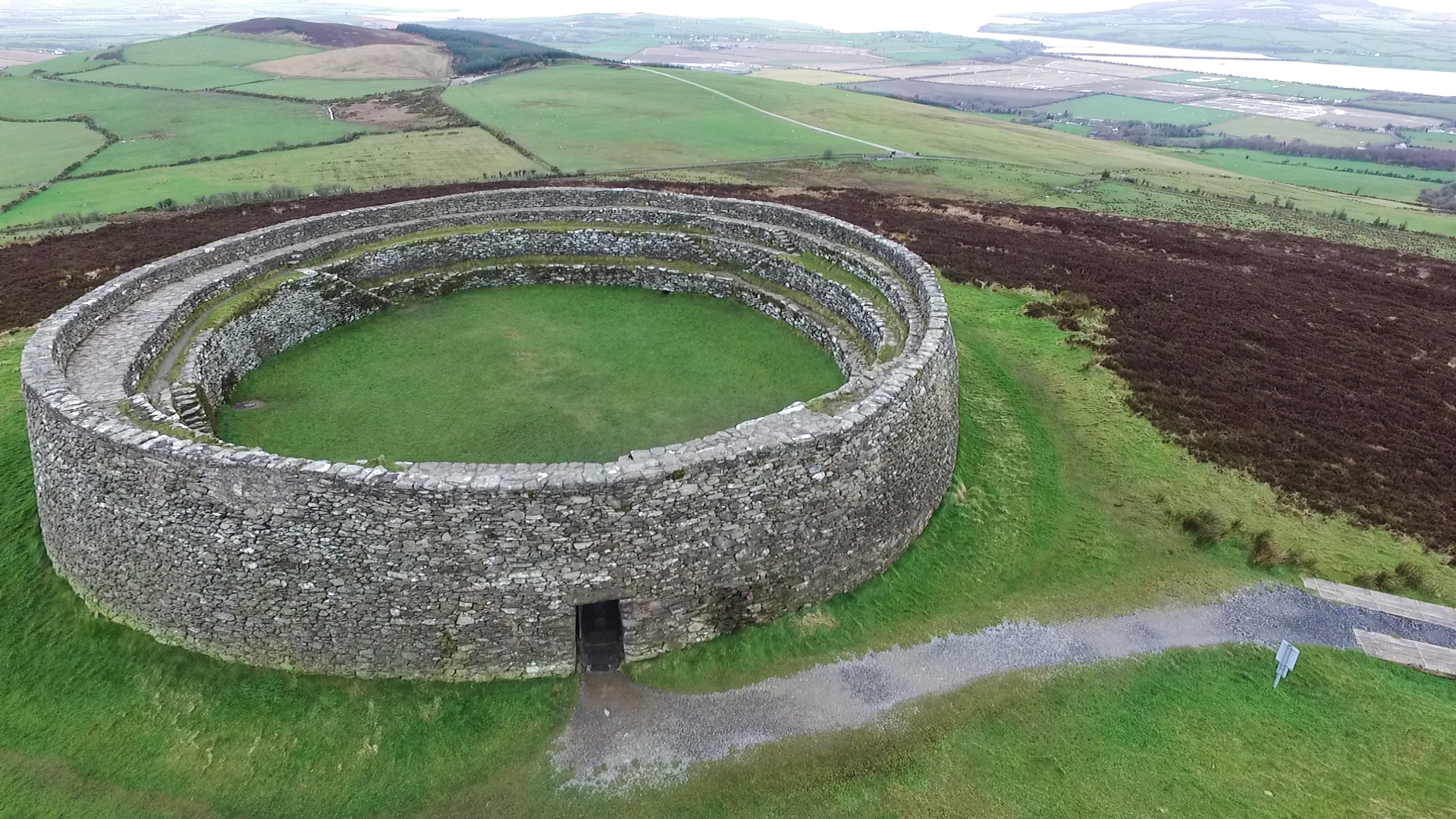
The Iron Age fortress Grianan of Aileach (Irish: Grianán Ailigh).

The variant of the Irish language spoken in County Donegal shares many traits with Scottish Gaelic. The Irish spoken in the Donegal Gaeltacht (Irish-speaking area) is of the Ulster dialect, while Inishowen (parts of which only became English-speaking in the early 20th century) used the East Ulster dialect. Ulster Scots is often spoken in both the Finn Valley and the Laggan district of East Donegal. Donegal Irish has a strong influence on learnt Irish across Ulster.

Like other areas on the western seaboard of Ireland, parts of County Donegal have a distinctive fiddle tradition which is of world renown. County Donegal is also well known for its songs, which have, like the instrumental music, a distinctive sound. Donegal musical artists such as the bands Clannad, The Pattersons, and Altan and solo artist Enya, have had international success with traditional or traditional flavoured music. Donegal music has also influenced people not originally from the county, including folk and pop singers Paul Brady and Phil Coulter. Singer Daniel O'Donnell has become a popular ambassador for the county. Popular music is also common, the county's most acclaimed rock artist being the Ballyshannon-born Rory Gallagher. Other acts to come out of Donegal include folk-rock band Goats Don't Shave, Eurovision contestant Mickey Joe Harte, and indie rock group The Revs. In more recent years, bands such as in Their Thousands and Mojo Gogo have featured on the front page of Hot Press magazine.

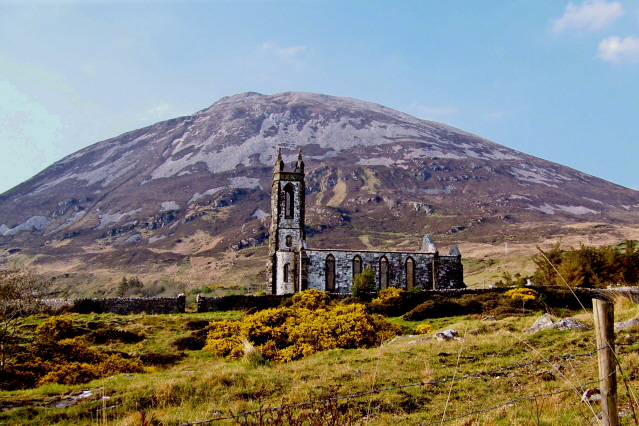
Errigal towers over Gweedore and Cloughaneely. The former Church of Ireland church (now ruined) at Dunlewey can be seen in the foreground. The church was built in the early 1850s.

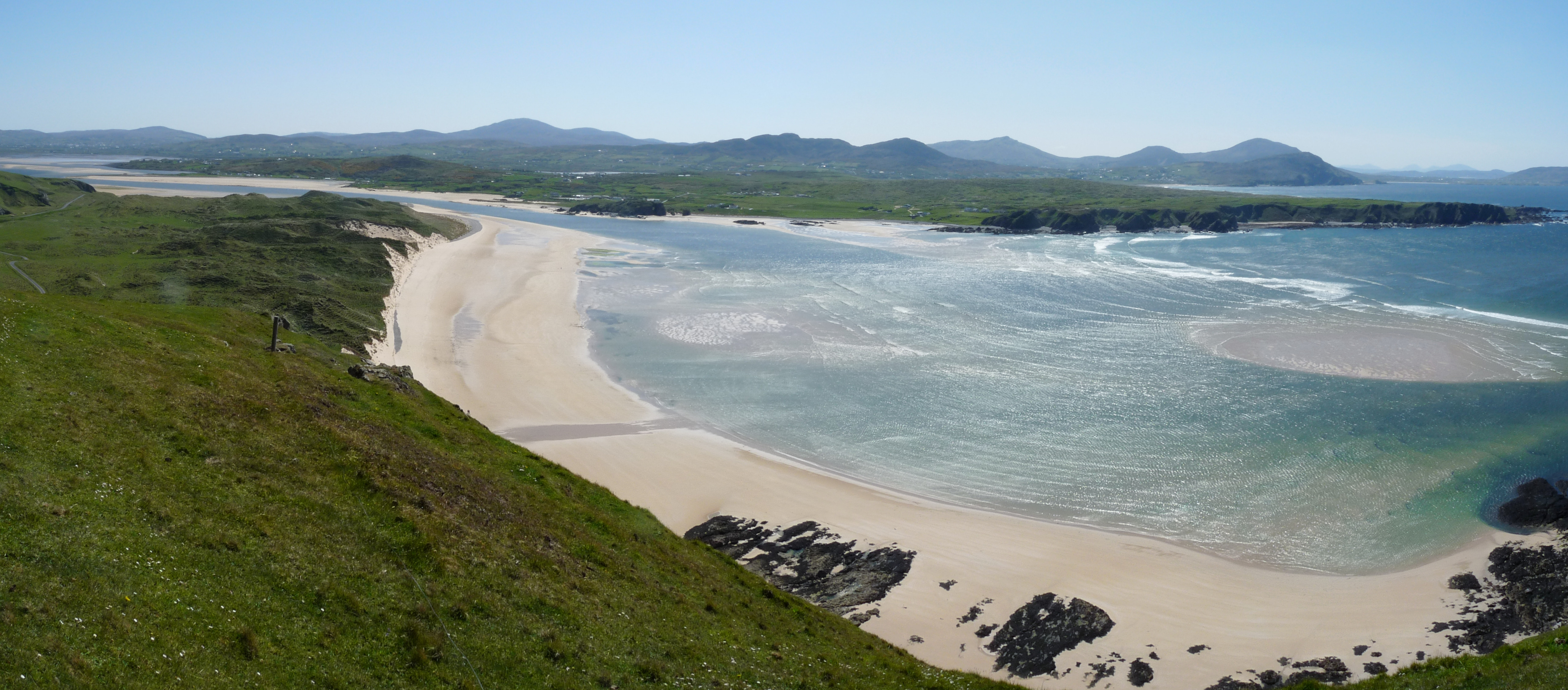
Five Finger Strand, Inishowen.

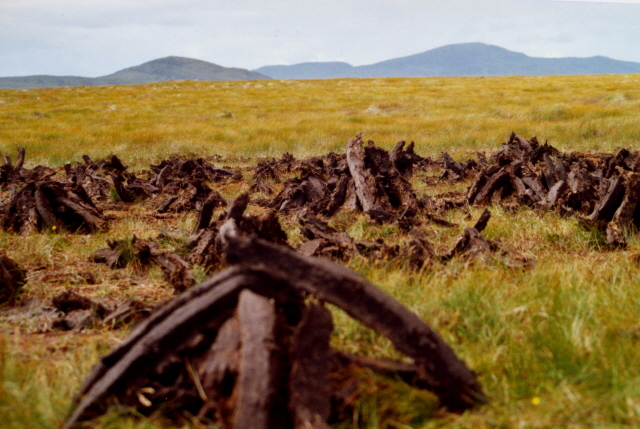
Cut turf between Carndonagh and Redcastle.

County Donegal has a long literary tradition in both Irish and English. The Irish navvy-turned-novelist Patrick MacGill, author of many books about the experiences of Irish migrant itinerant labourers in Britain at around the start of the 20th century, such as The Rat Pit and the autobiographical Children of the Dead End, is from the Glenties area. The MacGill Summer School in Glenties is named in his honour and attracts national interest as a forum for the analysis of current affairs. The novelist and socialist politician Peadar O'Donnell hailed from The Rosses in west Donegal. The poet William Allingham was also from Ballyshannon. Modern exponents include the Inishowen playwright and poet Frank McGuinness and the playwright Brian Friel. Many of Friel's plays are set in the fictional Donegal town of Ballybeg.

Authors in County Donegal have been creating works, like the Annals of the Four Masters, in Irish and Latin since the Early Middle Ages. The Irish philosopher John Toland was born in Inishowen in 1670. He was thought of as the original freethinker by George Berkeley. Toland was also instrumental in the spread of freemasonry throughout Continental Europe. In modern Irish, Donegal has produced several (sometimes controversial) authors such as the brothers Séamus Ó Grianna and Seosamh Mac Grianna from The Rosses and the contemporary (and controversial) Irish-language poet Cathal Ó Searcaigh from Gortahork in Cloughaneely, and where he is known to locals as Gúrú na gCnoc ('Guru of the Hills').

County Donegal is known for its textiles, whose unique woollen blends are made of short threads with tiny bits of colour blended in for a heathered effect. Sometimes they are woven in a rustic herringbone format and other times in more of a box weave of varied colours. These weaves are known as donegal tweeds (with a small 'd ') and are world-renowned.

There is a sizeable minority of Ulster Protestants in County Donegal, and most Donegal Protestants trace their ancestors to settlers who arrived during the Plantation of Ulster throughout the 17th century. The Church of Ireland is the largest Protestant denomination, with Presbyterianism second. The areas of County Donegal with the highest percentage of Protestants are The Laggan district of East Donegal, centred on Raphoe; the Finn Valley; and areas around Ramelton, Milford and Dunfanaghy – where their proportion reaches up to 30–45 per cent. There is also a large Protestant population between Donegal Town and Ballyshannon in the south of the county. In absolute terms, Letterkenny has the largest number of Protestants (over 1,000).

The Earagail Arts Festival is held within the county each July.

People from County Donegal have also contributed to culture elsewhere. Francis Alison was one of the founders of the College of Philadelphia, which would later become the University of Pennsylvania. Francis Makemie (originally from Ramelton) founded the Presbyterian Church in America. David Steele, from Upper Creevaugh, was a prominent Reformed Presbyterian, or Covenanter, a minister who emigrated to the United States in 1824. Charles Inglis, who was the first Church of England bishop of the Diocese of Nova Scotia, was the third son of Archibald Inglis, the Rector in Glencolmcille.

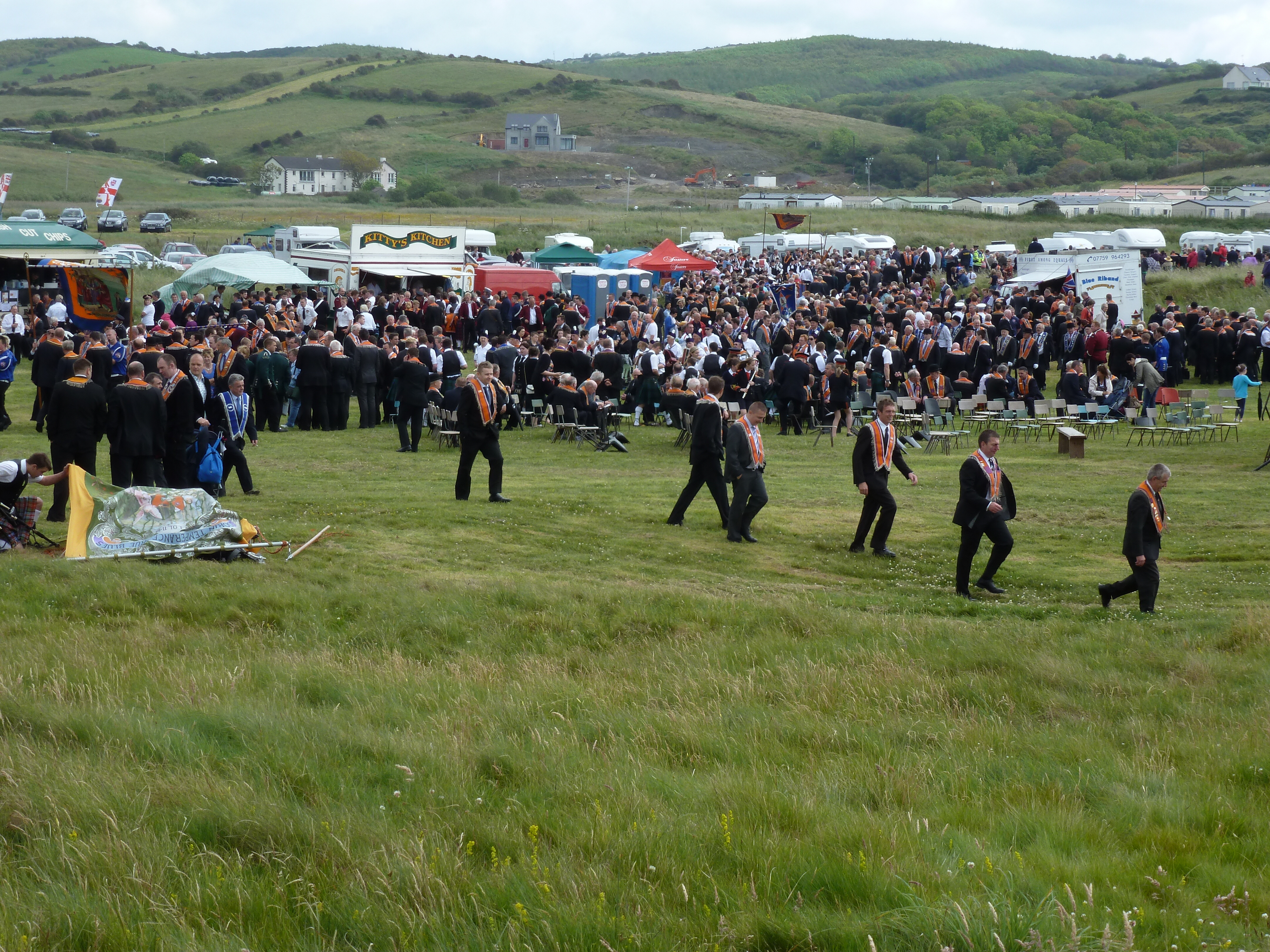
Orange Lodges at Rossnowlagh

The Twelfth is observed annually in Rossnowlagh, County Donegal by members of the Orange Order and loyalists. It is held on the Saturday preceding 12 July. It is the only major Orange Order demonstration held each year in the Republic of Ireland and attracts participants from County Donegal, neighbouring border counties, Northern Ireland and overseas. Orange Lodges from the county, as well as from Cavan and Monaghan, partake in the procession. Each lodge is accompanied by a marching band. The event commemorates the victory of King William III at the Battle of the Boyne in 1690. In addition to the Rossnowlagh demonstration, a number of smaller Orange parades are held in east Donegal during the marching season.

== Places of interest ==
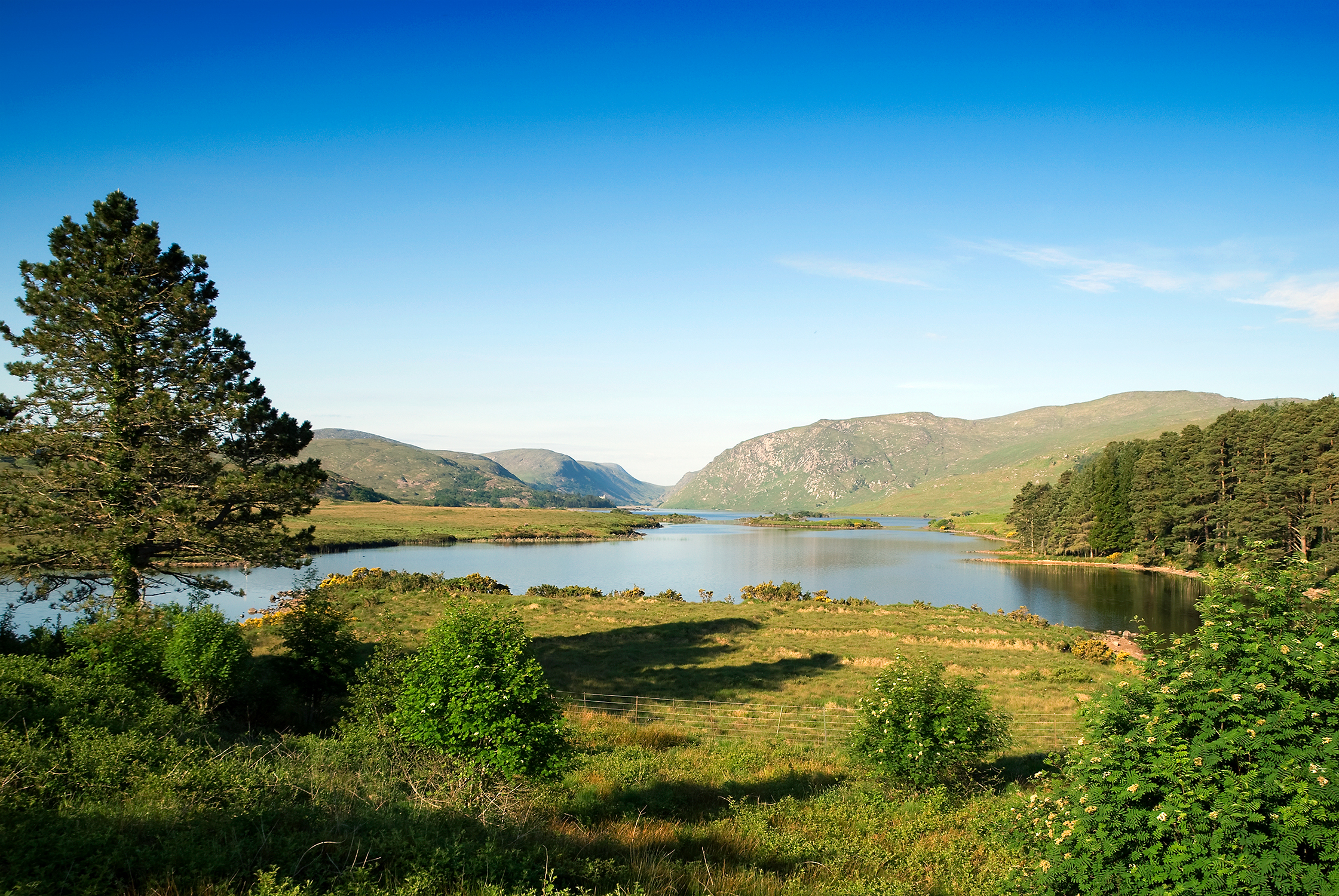
Glenveagh National Park, the second largest in Ireland

The area's attractions include Glenveagh National Park (formerly part of the Glenveagh Estate). The park is a 170 km^{2} (about 42,000 acre) nature reserve with scenery of mountains, raised boglands, lakes, and woodlands. At its heart is Glenveagh Castle, a late Victorian 'folly' that was originally built as a summer residence. The Shuggling Stone, a granite boulder near Glen village, is a picturesque site. County Donegal was voted number one on The National Geographic Traveller (UK) 'cool list' for 2017.

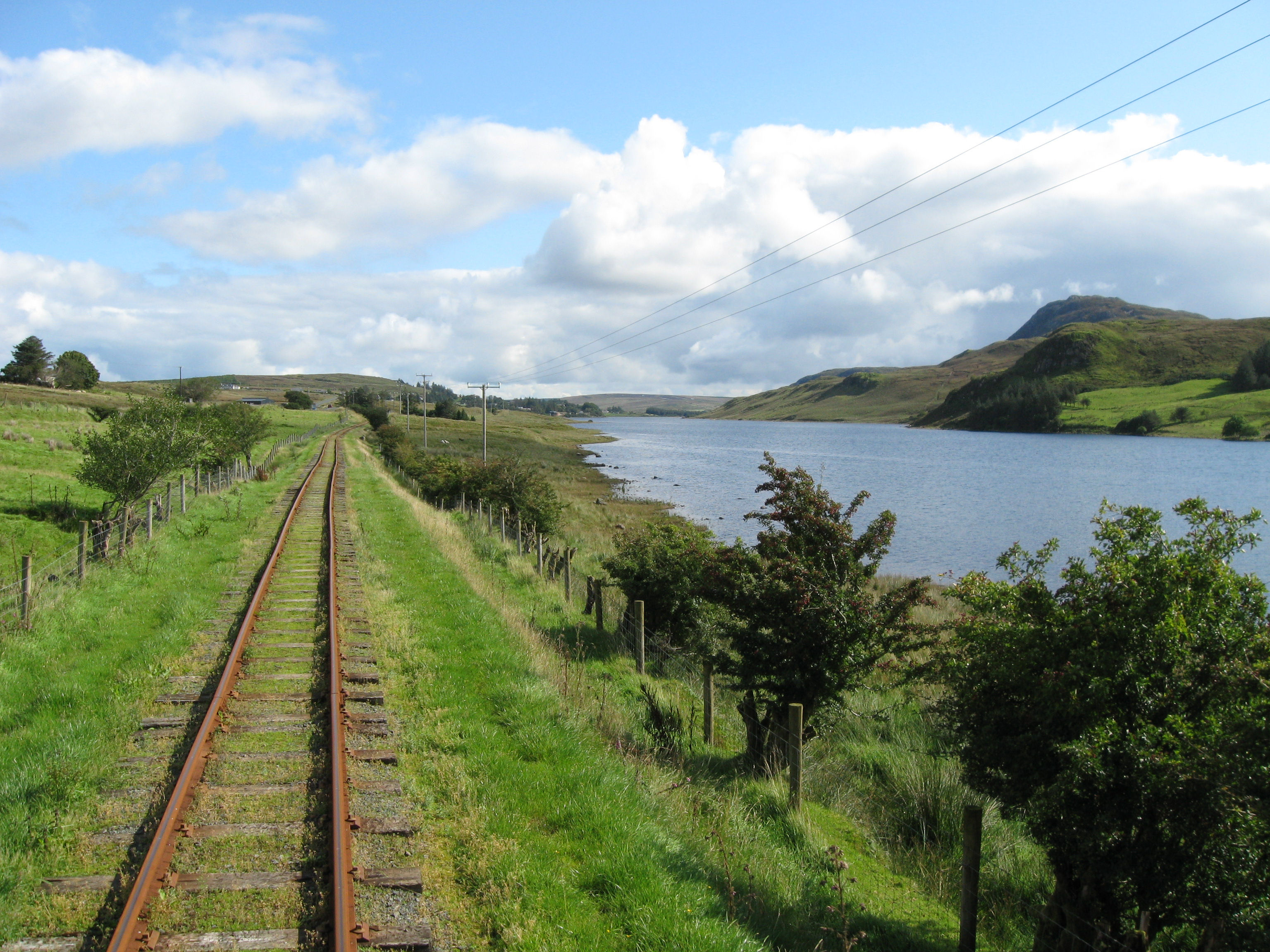
Fintown Railway on the track of County Donegal Railways Joint Committee next to Lough Finn near Fintown railway station.

The Donegal Gaeltacht (Irish-speaking district) also attracts young people to County Donegal each year during the school summer holidays. The three-week-long summer Gaeltacht courses give young Irish people from other parts of the country a chance to learn the Irish language and traditional Irish cultural traditions that are still prevalent in parts of Donegal. The Donegal Gaeltacht has traditionally been a very popular destination each summer for young people from Northern Ireland. Scuba diving is also very popular with a club being located in Donegal Town.

== Education ==
Higher education within the county is provided by the Letterkenny campus of the Atlantic Technological University (ATU; formerly the Letterkenny Institute of Technology (LYIT), popularly known locally as 'the Regional', established in the 1970s). In addition, many young people from the county attend third-level institutions elsewhere in Ireland, especially at Magee College and other institutions in Derry, and also at: Ulster University at Coleraine (UUC); Ulster University at Jordanstown (UUJ); The Queen's University of Belfast (Queen's or QUB); and the University of Galway (formerly NUI Galway). Some Donegal students also attend the Limavady campus of the North West Regional College (popularly known as Limavady Tech) and the Omagh campus of South West College (popularly known as Omagh Tech or Omagh College).

== Sport ==
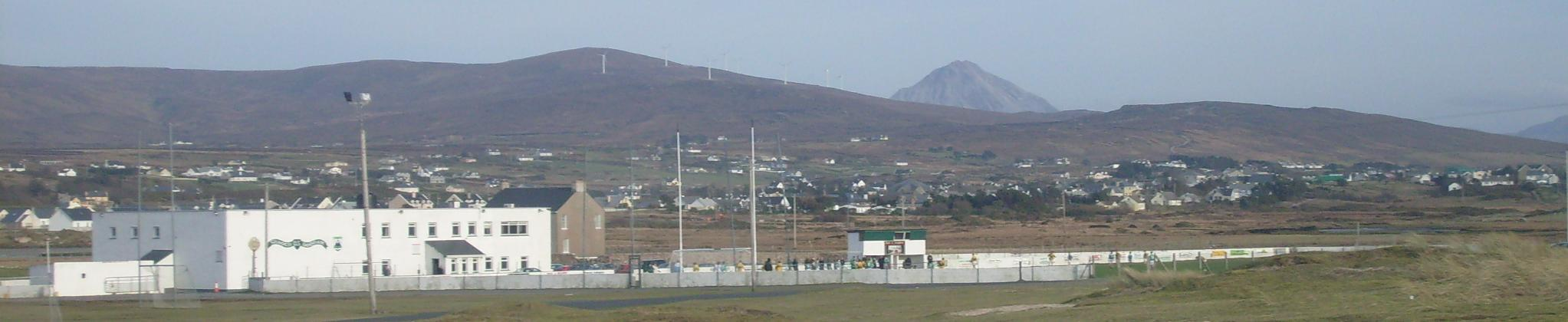
Gaoth Dobhair GAA grounds.

=== Gaelic football and hurling ===
The Gaelic Athletic Association (G.A.A.) sport of Gaelic football is very popular in County Donegal. Donegal's inter-county football team has won the All-Ireland Senior Football Championship title twice (in 1992 and 2012) and the Ulster Senior Football Championship ten times. Donegal emerged victorious from the 2012 All-Ireland Senior Football Championship Final on 23 September 2012 to take the Sam Maguire Cup for only the second time, with early goals from Michael Murphy and Colm McFadden setting up a victory of 2–11 to 0–13 over Mayo. In 2007, Donegal won only their second national title by winning the National Football League. On 24 April 2011, Donegal added their third national title when they defeated Laois to capture the National Football League Division Two. They added another Division Two title in 2019. There are 16 clubs in the Donegal Senior Football Championship, with many others playing at a lower level.

Hurling (often called 'hurley' within County Donegal), handball, and rounders are also played but are less widespread, as is the case in other parts of western Ulster. The Donegal county senior hurling team won the Lory Meagher Cup in 2011 and the Nicky Rackard Cup in 2013.

=== Rugby Union ===
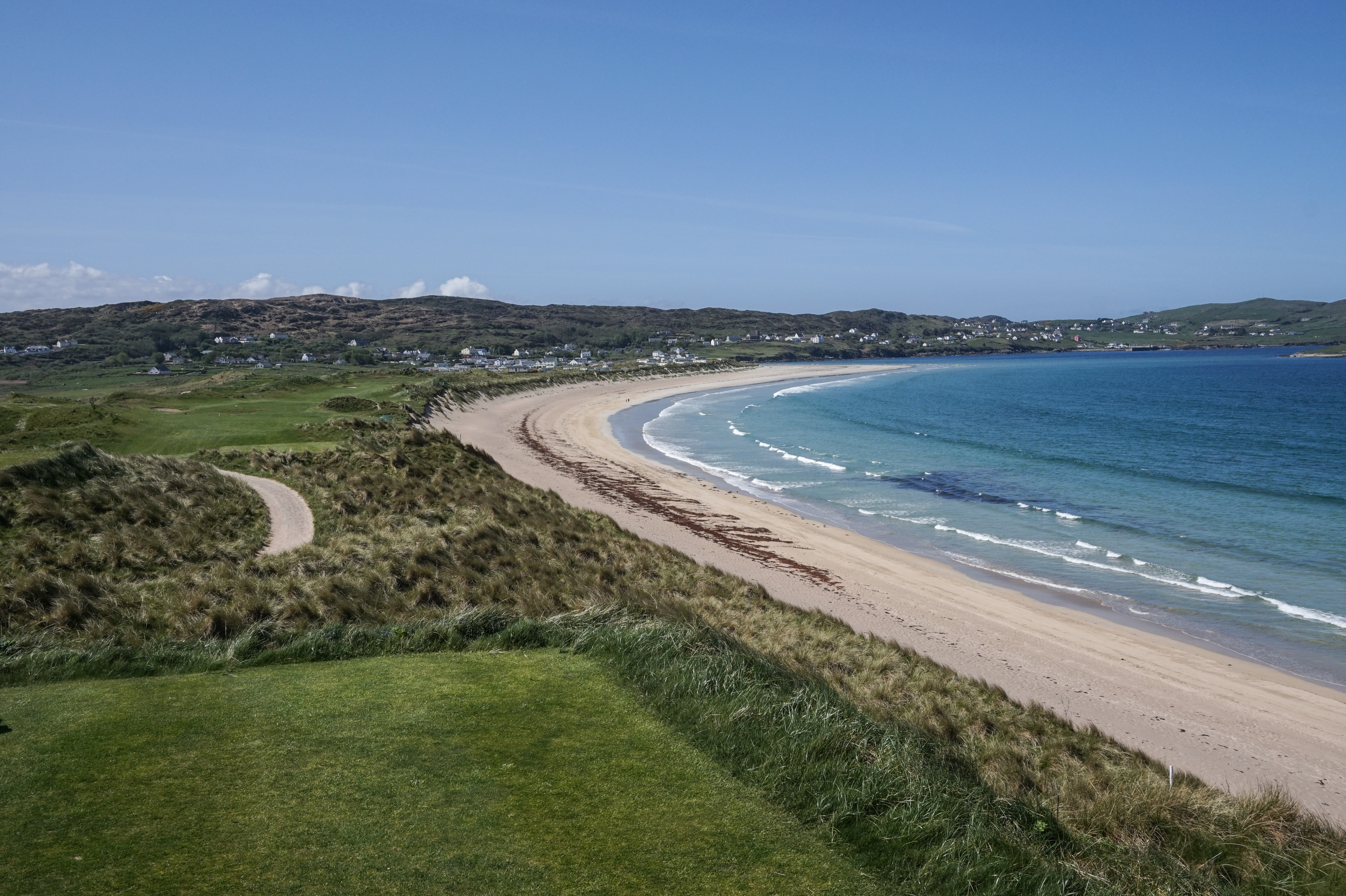
Narin and Portnoo Golf club, one of the many links courses in the county

There are several rugby teams in the county. These include Ulster Qualifying League Two side Letterkenny RFC, whose ground is named after Dave Gallaher, the captain of the 1905 New Zealand All Blacks touring team, who have since become known as The Originals. He was born in nearby Ramelton.

Ulster Qualifying League: Three sides include Ballyshannon RFC, Donegal Town RFC, and Inishowen RFC. Finn Valley RFC and Tir Chonaill RFC both compete in the Ulster Minor League North.

=== Association football ===
Finn Harps play in the League of Ireland and play their home matches at Finn Park in Ballybofey. The club's colours are blue and white, and they go by the nickname "Harps". The club won the FAI Cup in 1973–74, which remains their highest profile achievement to date. They are the county's only League of Ireland club, with the county's other clubs playing in either the Ulster Senior League or the local junior leagues.

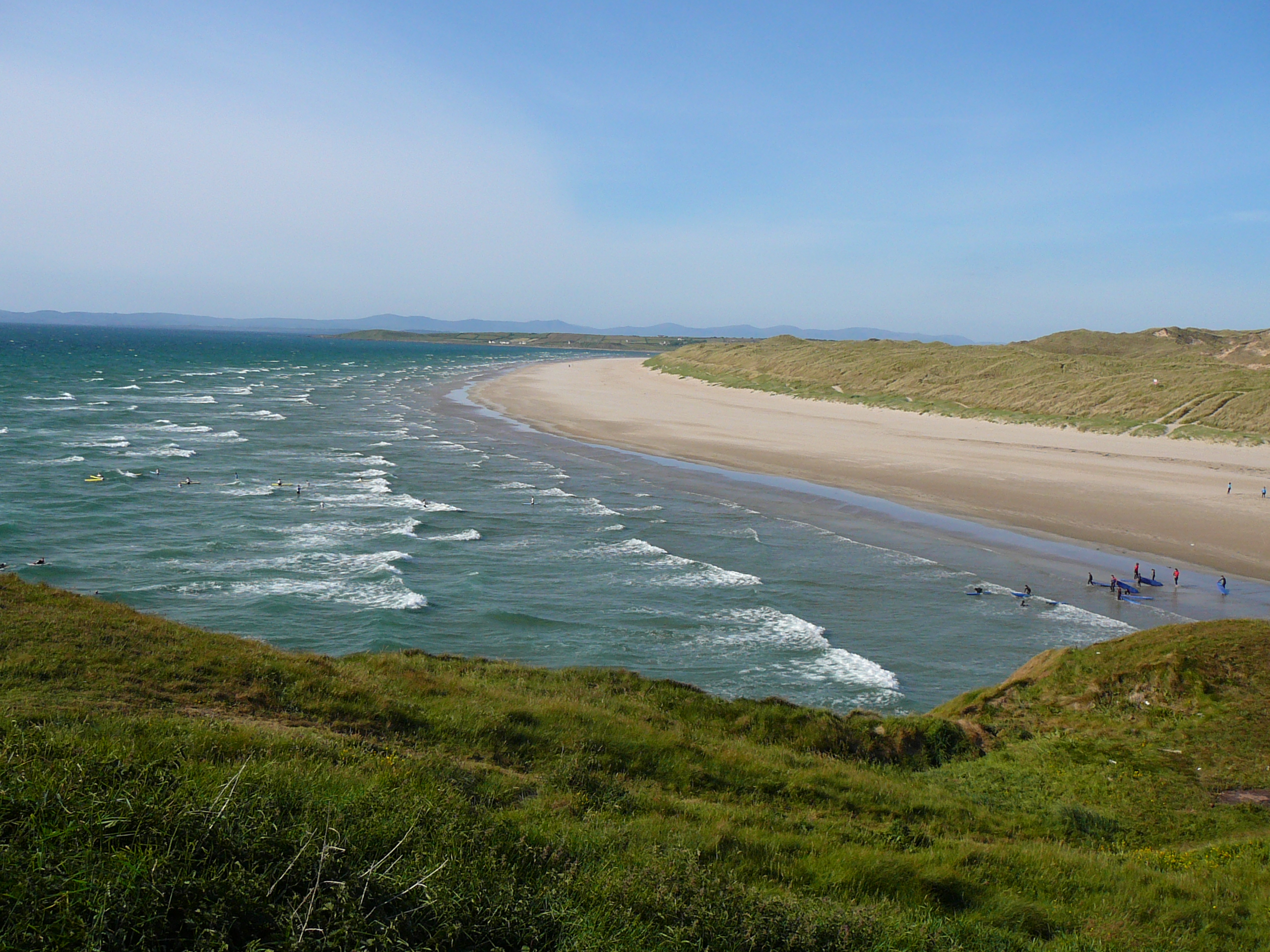
Bundoran was included, in a 2012 edition of National Geographic magazine, in a list of the world's top 20 surf towns

=== Golf ===
There are several golf courses such as Ballyliffin Golf Club, located in the Inishowen peninsula. Other courses of note are Murvagh (located outside Donegal Town) and Rosapenna (Sandy Hills) located in Downings (near Carrigart). The Glashedy Links is ranked 19th in Golf Digest's list of the best golf courses in Ireland. The old links were ranked 17th, Murvagh 20th and Sandy Hills 25th.

=== Cricket ===
Cricket is chiefly confined to the Laggan district and the Finn Valley in the east of the county. The town of Raphoe and the nearby village of St Johnston, both in The Laggan, are the traditional strongholds of cricket within the county. The game is mainly played and followed by members of the Ulster Protestants of County Donegal. St Johnston Cricket Club play in the North West Senior League, while Letterkenny Cricket Club play in the Derry Midweek League.

=== Athletics ===
Athletic pursuits have been highly popular in Donegal over the years, with numerous athletes from County Donegal going on to represent Ireland at the international level, with at least five winning medals at major events. Such athletes include Danny McDaid in the World Cross-Country Championships in 1979, Bridie Lynch who won medals in the World Paralympic Games in 1992 and 1996, Gary Murray who came 8th in the European Junior Cross-Country Championship of 1999, and Mark English who won medals in the European 800m Championships in 2014, 2015, 2018 and 2019. Sommer Lecky also achieved silver in the World Junior High Jump 2018. Other notable athletes from Donegal include Paul Dolan, Caitriona Jennings, and Brendan Boyce, each of whom has represented Ireland at the international level.

=== Other sports ===
Donegal's rugged landscape and coastline lend themselves to active sports like climbing, mountain biking, hillwalking, surfing, and kite-flying.

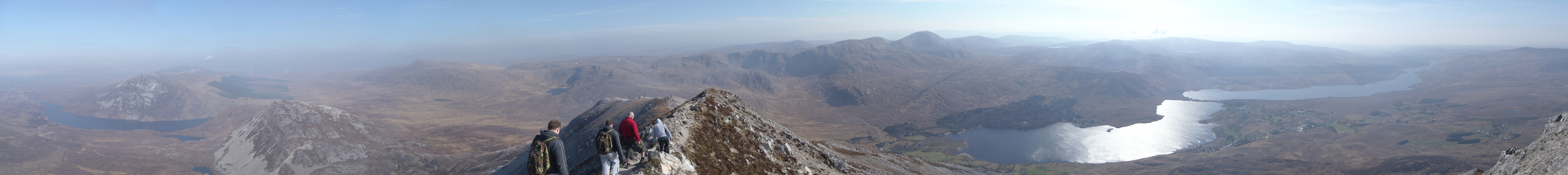
Panoramic view of Errigal's summit.

== See also ==
- List of monastic houses in County Donegal
- List of National Monuments in County Donegal
- List of public art in County Donegal
- List of townlands of County Donegal
- List of towns and villages in the Republic of Ireland
- List of abbeys and priories in the Republic of Ireland (County Donegal)
- People from County Donegal
- County Donegal (Parliament of Ireland constituency)
- Earagail Arts Festival
- High Sheriff of Donegal
- Lord Lieutenant of Donegal
- The Troubles
- Wild Atlantic Way
- Báidín Fheilimí
