= Donegal East =

Donegal East or East Donegal may refer to:

- East Donegal (UK Parliament constituency) (1885–1922), Ireland
- Donegal East (Dáil constituency) (1937–1961), Ireland
- East Donegal Township, Lancaster County, Pennsylvania, United States
