= J. Wadsworth Ritchie =

American sportsman and rancher (1861–1924)

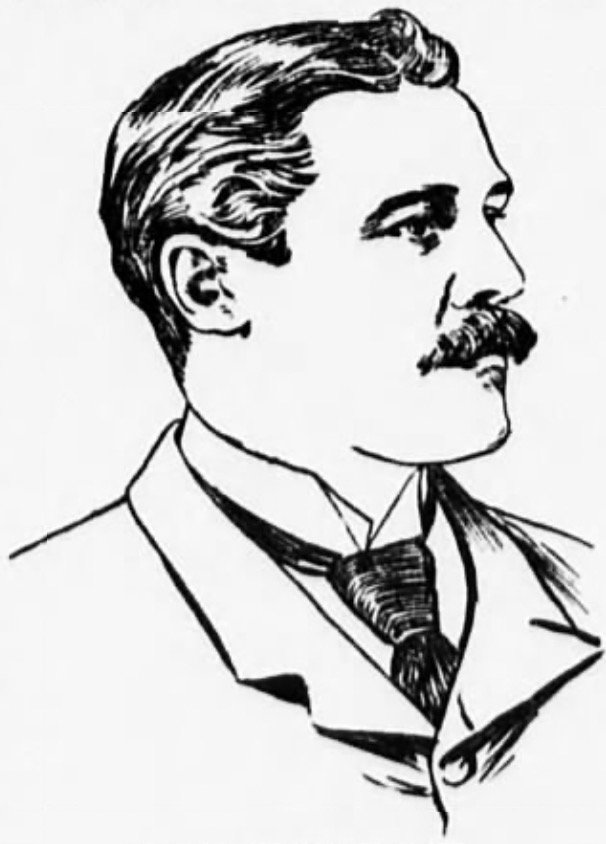
- Born: James Wadsworth Ritchie; May 24, 1861; Geneseo, New York, US
- Died: March 22, 1924 (aged 62); Ashwell, Rutland, England
- Spouses: Emily Montague Tooker (m. 1895; died 1903) Daisy Muriel Hoare (m. 1907)
- Children: 3, including Gabrielle, Montie
- Parent(s): Montgomery Harrison Ritchie; Cornelia Wadsworth
- Relatives: James S. Wadsworth (grandfather)

James Wadsworth Ritchie (May 24, 1861 – March 22, 1924) was an American sportsman and rancher who was prominent in New York Society during the Gilded Age.

== Early life ==
Ritchie was born on May 24, 1861, in Geneseo, New York. He was the son of Montgomery Harrison Ritchie and Cornelia Wadsworth (1837–1921). From his parents marriage, he had one brother, Arthur Ritchie, who died in childhood. Through his father, he was descended from Federalist party leader Harrison Gray Otis. His paternal grandparents were Mary Craig (née Wharton) Wadsworth and General James S. Wadsworth. Among his extended family members was uncle James Wolcott Wadsworth and first cousin, James W. Wadsworth Jr., who were both successful New York politicians. Ritchie's aunt, Elizabeth Wadsworth, married Arthur Smith-Barry, 1st Baron Barrymore in 1889, becoming Lady Barrymore.

Following his father's early death in 1864 from an illness contracted in battle during the U.S. Civil War that also killed his grandfather (during the Battle of the Wilderness in Virginia), Ritchie's mother met and, in 1869, remarried to John George Adair, a Scottish-Irish businessman and landowner from County Donegal. After their marriage, they lived at Glenveagh Castle in Ireland, in Great Britain, and New York City, where Adair, also known as "Jack Adair", opened a brokerage house. His stepfather also owned a large cattle ranch, known as JA Ranch, southeast of Amarillo in the Texas Panhandle.

== Career ==
After his step-father's death in 1885, Ritchie's now twice-widowed mother divided the JA Ranch holdings with Charles Goodnight. In 1887, Ritchie traveled to the ranch to learn the cattle business from his stepfather's old partner who continued to manage the late Adair's properties, and hired Ritchie as a cowhand, eventually promoting him to foreman. Reportedly, Ritchie adapted quickly to the Panhandle and lived in a dugout at the original Tule campsite.

In January 1888, Ritchie was demoted for gambling. Soon afterward, his mother persuaded him to travel to New York where he managed the New York City Police Department's purchase of horses from the ranch. Ritchie visited the ranch several times and was assisted in hiring Richard Walsh as manager of the ranch.

=== Military career ===
Following the outbreak of the Second Boer War, Ritchie enlisted for service in 1899. Although he remained an American citizen, he was promoted to major in the British Cavalry and his ability to manage men and horses, earned him promotions and praise from the British.

=== Society life ===
In 1892, Ritchie, who had not yet married, was included in Ward McAllister's "The Four Hundred", purported to be an index of New York's best families, published in The New York Times. Conveniently, 400 was the number of people that could fit into Mrs. Astor's ballroom. After he 1895 wedding to Emily, her father gave his Newport, Rhode Island, house, including all its furnishings, chandeliers, and draperies, to his children, who promptly divided the contents and sold the home.

== Personal life ==
In 1895, Ritchie was married to Emily Montague Tooker (1872–1903). She was the daughter of Margaret Augusta (née Peckham) Tooker and Gabriel Mead Tooker. Emily's older sister, Charlotte Augusta Tooker, who was considered the "beauty of the family", was married to prominent architect Whitney Warren of Warren and Wetmore. Emily, who was said to be "not in the least bit pretty," had previously been engaged to A. Lanfear Norrie in 1893. She died only a few years later in 1903 at their home in Ashwell, England, at the age of 31.

In 1907, Ritchie married Daisy Muriel Hoare, an Englishwoman, who was the daughter of first-class cricketer and High Sheriff of Oxfordshire, Charles Twysden Hoare of Bignell, Bicester. They settled in his home in Ashwell, Rutland, England. Together, the couple were the parents of three children, including:

- Gabrielle Muriel Ritchie (1908–1995), who married three times. Her second marriage was to Charles R. Style, a brewery manager, and her third was in 1951 to Alexander Keiller, archaeologist and family heir of marmalade makers in Dundee.
- Montgomery Harrison Wadsworth "Montie" Ritchie (1910–1999), who married twice and worked the JA Ranch.
- Richard Morgan Wadsworth "Dick" Ritchie (1912–1940), who died from inhaling carbon monoxide from a faulty heater on his yacht while he was fishing off Corpus Christi.

In his later years, Ritchie's health failed and he became a semi-invalid. Ritchie died on March 22, 1924, and was buried in England.

=== Descendants ===
Through his son Montie, Ritchie was the paternal grandfather of Cornelia Wadsworth "Nina" Ritchie, who was the first wife of Republican Texas State Senator Teel Bivins of Amarillo, who, prior to his death in 2006, served as U.S. Ambassador to Sweden during the second administration of U.S. President George W. Bush. Their son Andrew M. Bivins also works for JA Ranch.
