= Gabrielle Keiller =

Golf champion, art collector (1908–1995)

Gabrielle Muriel Keiller
- Born: Gabrielle Ritchie; 10 August 1908; North Berwick, Scotland
- Died: 23 December 1995 (aged 87); Bath, England
- Known for: golfer, art collector, art patron, photographer, heir to Keiller's marmalade
- Spouses: Charles R. Style (div. 1950) Alexander Keiller (m. 1951; died 1955)
- Parent(s): J. Wadsworth Ritchie; Daisy Muriel Hoare
- Relatives: Cornelia Adair (grandmother)

Gabrielle Muriel Keiller (née Ritchie) (10 August 1908 – 23 December 1995) was a Scottish golfer, art collector, archaeological photographer and heir to Keiller's marmalade in Dundee. She bequested a large collection of Dada and Surrealist art to the Scottish National Gallery of Modern Art.

== Early life ==
Keiller was born on 10 August 1908 in North Berwick, Scotland, during a golf trip by her parents, Englishwoman Daisy Muriel Hoare and J. Wadsworth Ritchie, an American rancher. She was the older sister of Montgomery Harrison Wadsworth Ritchie, who ran the family's Texas ranch, known as JA Ranch. During World War II she served as an ambulance driver.

Her paternal grandmother was Cornelia Adair, the American-born matriarch of Glenveagh Castle in County Donegal, Ireland who was married to John George Adair, a Scottish-Irish businessman and landowner.

== Golf career ==
Keiller's amateur golf career began in the 1930s under the surname of her second husband, Style. She won the 1948 Ladies' Open Championships in Luxembourg, Switzerland and Monaco, and again in Monaco in 1949. In 1951 she was a finalist in the English Women's Amateur Championship.

== Art collector and patron ==
In the 1930s, Keiller inherited part-ownership of an Adair ranch in Texas from her grandmother. Proceeds from the later sale of this asset enabled her to begin collecting art. As an art patron, Keiller focused upon 20th-century avant-garde art. She became interested following a 1960 visit to the Peggy Guggenheim Collection in Venice, and through exposure to the work of Eduardo Paolozzi at the 1960 Venice Biennale.

Keiller developed her collection of Dada and Surrealist art with the advice of the artist Roland Penrose. Her bequest to the Scottish National Gallery comprised over 170 artworks (including paintings, sculptures, prints and drawings) in addition to a library of manuscripts, rare books, and journals. The collection was exhibited there anonymously in 1988. In 1996, the collection was enhanced by 26 works from the collection of Penrose.

Keiller became a patron of both Paolozzi (who was said to have been inspired by her Surrealist collection) and Richard Long. She also commissioned Andy Warhol to make a 1976 portrait of her dachshund Maurice.

Beginning in the 1950s, Keiller became involved with several arts institutions. She volunteered at the Tate from 1976 to 1987, where she was known as the "Marmalade Queen". From 1978 to 1985, she was a member of the Scottish National Gallery of Modern Art's advisory committee.

== Archaeology ==
Her third husband, Alexander Keiller, had used wealth from his family's marmalade business to pursue interests in archaeology, particularly the stone circles at Avebury in Wiltshire and the surrounding prehistoric landscape. He bought land to ensure the preservation of the monuments, and in 1938 created a museum at Avebury. After his death in 1955, Gabrielle employed Isobel Smith to make archival records of Alexander's excavations in the 1920s and 1930s. Gabrielle gave the contents of the museum to the nation in 1966, after which it was named the Alexander Keiller Museum.

From 1956 to approximately 1970, she assisted Rupert Bruce-Mitford in a study of the burial ship Sutton Hoo, taking photographs of the site.

== Personal life ==
Keiller's second husband was Charles R. Style, a brewery manager. They divorced in 1950.

In 1951, she married her third husband, Alexander Keiller (1889–1955), archaeologist and family heir of Keiller marmalade makers in Dundee. The couple bought a house in Kingston upon Thames, where she lived for most of the rest of her life.

Keiller died at Bath on 23 December 1995.
