= Cornelia Adair =

American rancher (1837–1921)

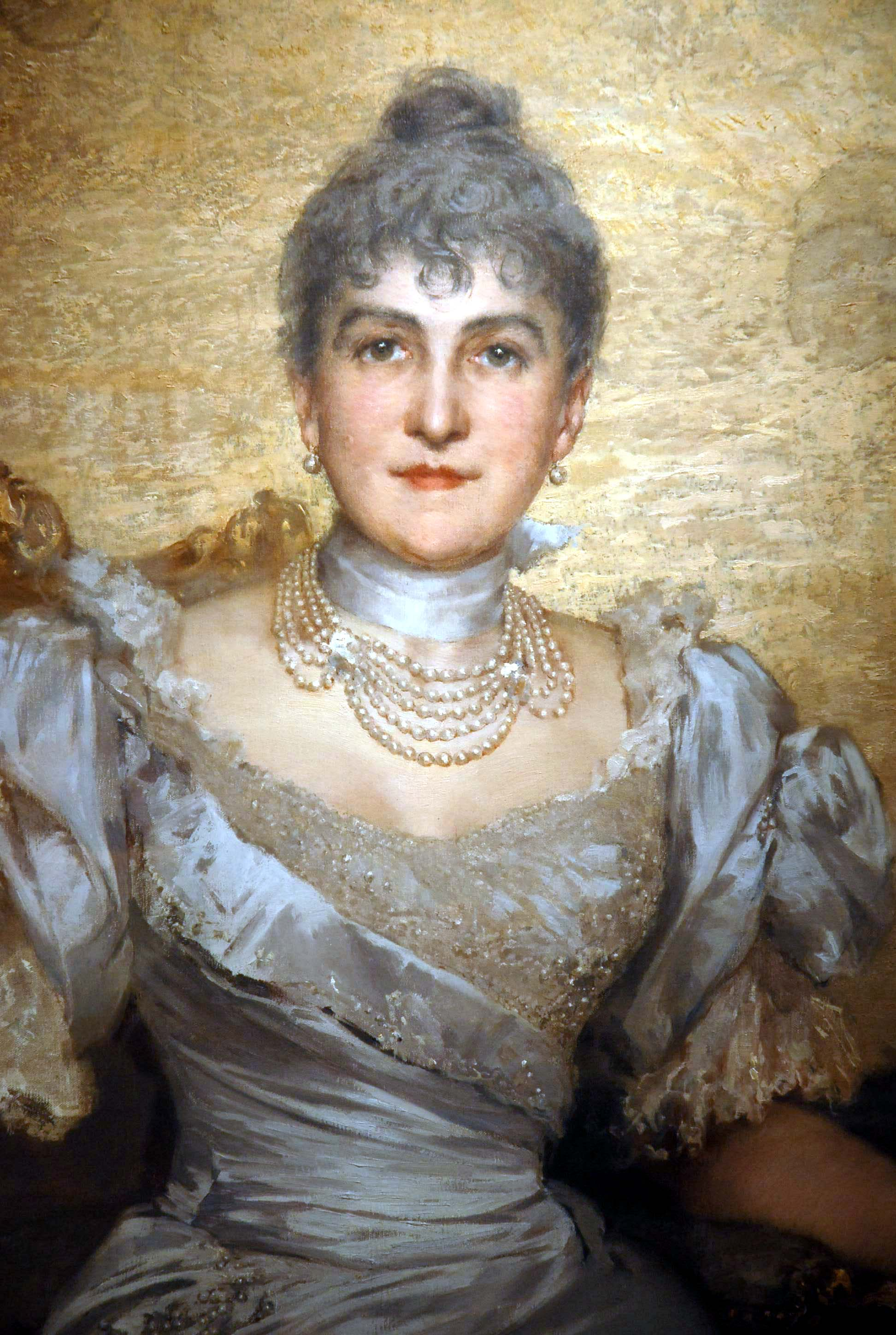
- Portrait Cornelia Adair, by Edoardo Tofano
- Born: Cornelia Wadsworth; April 6, 1837; Philadelphia, Pennsylvania, US
- Died: September 22, 1921 (aged 84); Corsham, England
- Occupations: Rancher, diarist
- Spouses: Montgomery Ritchie (m. 1857; died 1864) John George Adair (m. 1869; died 1885)
- Children: 2, including J. Wadsworth Ritchie
- Father: James S. Wadsworth
- Relatives: James Wolcott Wadsworth (brother); James Wolcott Wadsworth Jr. (nephew); Charles James Murray (cousin); James Wadsworth (grandfather); Gabrielle Keiller (granddaughter)

Cornelia Wadsworth Ritchie Adair (April 6, 1837 – September 22, 1921) was a Texas ranch landowner.

== Early life ==
Born Cornelia Wadsworth on April 6, 1837, in Philadelphia, Pennsylvania, she was one of six children of James S. Wadsworth and Mary Craig (née Wharton) Wadsworth. Adair grew up in a wealthy family who owned over 50,000 acres of land near Geneseo, New York and built a 13,000 square-foot house there in 1835. Her father was a Union general in the American Civil War who was mortally wounded in battle during the Battle of the Wilderness of 1864. Her brother was U.S. Representative James Wolcott Wadsworth, and her sister was Elizabeth S. Wadsworth, who married Arthur Smith-Barry, 1st Baron Barrymore.

Through her brother James, she was an aunt of U.S. Senator James Wolcott Wadsworth Jr., who married to Alice Evelyn Hay, daughter of former Secretary of State John Hay. Her Wadsworth ancestors established Hartford, Connecticut, after moving from the Massachusetts Bay Colony. Her paternal grandfather was James Wadsworth, one of the largest landowners in New York. An aunt, Elizabeth Wadsworth, married the British diplomat Sir Charles Murray, and was the mother of Charles James Murray, MP for Hastings and Coventry.

== Life and ranch ==
She became an accomplished horserider which encouraged her interests in traveling across the prairies of the western United States. In 1876, her second husband, John George Adair, became a partner with Charles Goodnight to found the JA Ranch. When her husband died, she became partner. She enjoyed hunting and participated at roundups. She founded a hospital, and supported building the Clarendon YMCA building.

In addition to her life on the ranch, Adair "spent much of her time in her fashionable house" on Curzon Street in Mayfair district of London, where she often entertained Edward VII (the son and successor of Queen Victoria) when he was Prince of Wales. She also stayed at a Rathdaire, Ireland, cottage and at her Glenveagh Castle in County Donegal, Ireland. In retirement, she built a home in Bath, England.

== Personal life ==
In 1857, she was married to Montgomery Harrison Ritchie (1826–1864), the son of Andrew Ritchie and Sophia Harrison (née Otis) Ritchie (a daughter of U.S. Senator Harrison Gray Otis). Before his death in 1864 from complications after serving in the Civil War, they became the parents of two children:

- James Wadsworth Ritchie (1861–1924), who married Emily Montague Tooker, a daughter of Gabriel Mead Tooker, in 1895. After her death in 1903 he married Daisy Muriel Hoare, a daughter of Charles Hoare, in 1907.
- Arthur Montgomery Ritchie (1861–1909), who struggled with mental health and jumped to his death while a patient at Dr. Gardner's Belmont Sanatorium.

In 1869, she married John George "Jack" Adair (1823–1885), a Scottish-Irish businessman and landowner. Following the wedding, the couple moved to Geneseo, New York. The couple divided their time between Ireland, England, and New York until his death in Missouri in 1885.

Adair died at Corsham near Bath in England on September 22, 1921.

=== Descendants ===
Through her son James, she was a grandmother of Gabrielle (née Ritchie) Keiller (1908–1995), the golfer, art collector, archaeological photographer and heir to Keiller's marmalade through her marriage to archaeologist Alexander Keiller. She bequeathed a large collection of Dada and Surrealist art to the Scottish National Gallery of Modern Art.

She was also a grandmother of Montgomery Harrison Wadsworth "Montie" Ritchie (1910–1999), whose daughter, Cornelia's great-granddaughter, Cornelia Wadsworth Ritchie, continued the family's ownership of JA Ranch.

== Works ==
- My diary, August 30 to November 5, 1874 introduction by Montagu K. Brown, illustrations by Malcolm Thurgood. Austin, Texas & London: Texas University Press, 1965. OCLC 556673646
- Letters of a cattle baroness, San Antonio, Tex., 1984. OCLC 310367842
