= Denis Grant King =

English archaeologist (1903–1994)

Denis Grant King (6 April 1903 – 23 February 1994) was an English archaeological draftsman, artist, historic monument conservation campaigner and archaeologist. He worked predominantly in Wiltshire, England, most notably as Alexander Keiller’s surveyor and draftsman during the excavations at Avebury.

== Early life and education ==
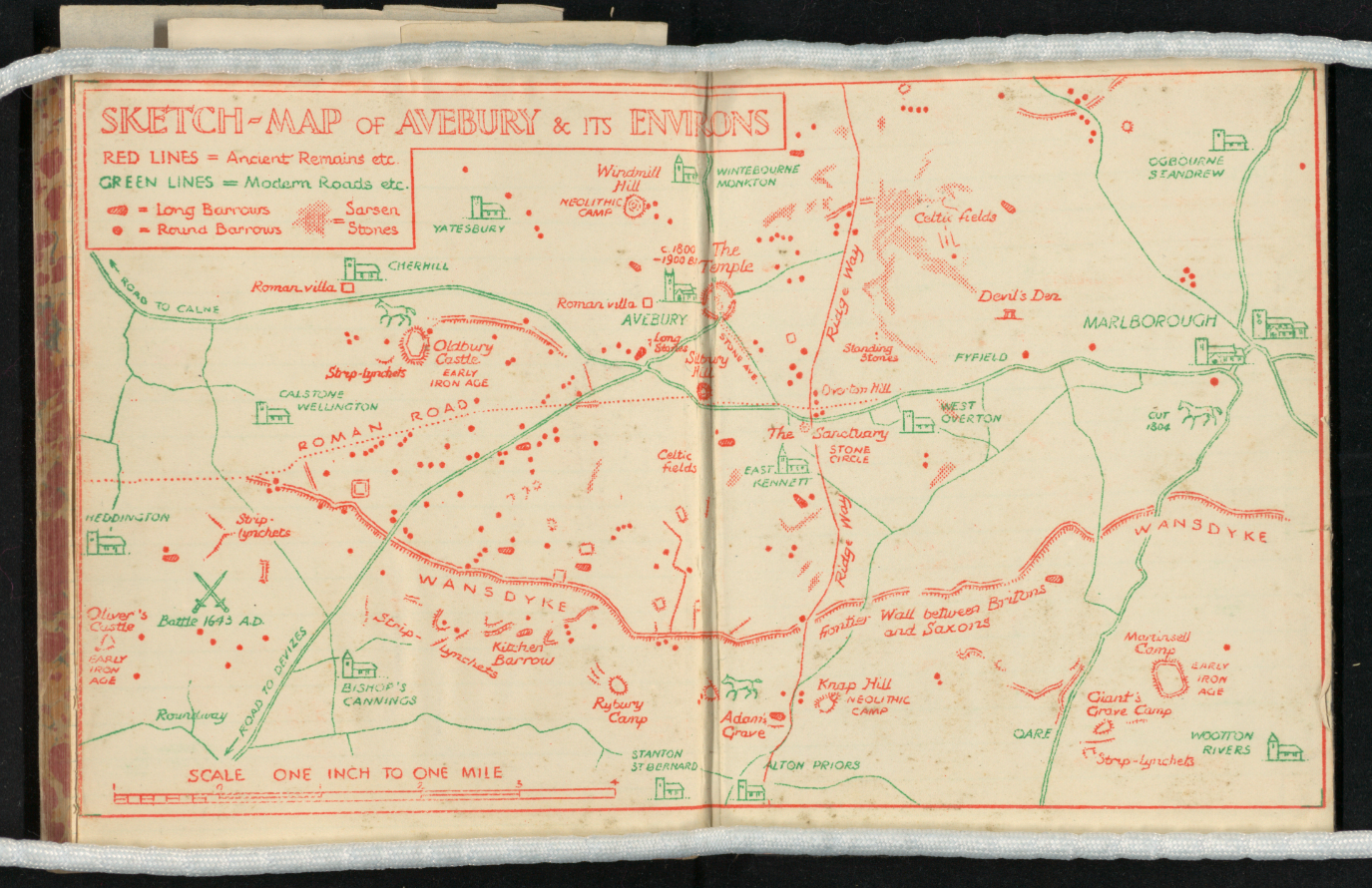
Map of Avebury and surrounding area made in 1938, by Denis Grant King, held at the Alexander Keiller Museum, accession number 1732623-002, page 80.

Denis Grant King was born on 6 April 1903 in Honor Oak Park, Kent. His father, Charles Grant King, was a self-employed artist, whose income came chiefly from advertising.

Denis attended the Blackheath School of Art.

== Avebury Stone Circle ==
Grant King was employed at Avebury from 1938 to 1941 as a draftsman and surveyor. His accurate site recording facilitated the repositioning of the fallen stones. As well as producing site plans and archaeological drawings, he kept a diary of the excavation and created observational cartoons for the amusement of his colleagues. The high standard of his site drawings was a notable feature of Grant King’s career. He was a conscientious objector during the wartime period and was allocated agricultural tasks; although initially charged with caring for poultry at the evacuated Beltaine School, he was promoted to teaching history and archaeology.

== Excavations in Wiltshire ==
After World War II, Grant King was employed by Keiller’s archaeological successor Dr Isobel Smith on her site at Windmill Hill, Avebury. After this, he went on to lead excavations of his own.

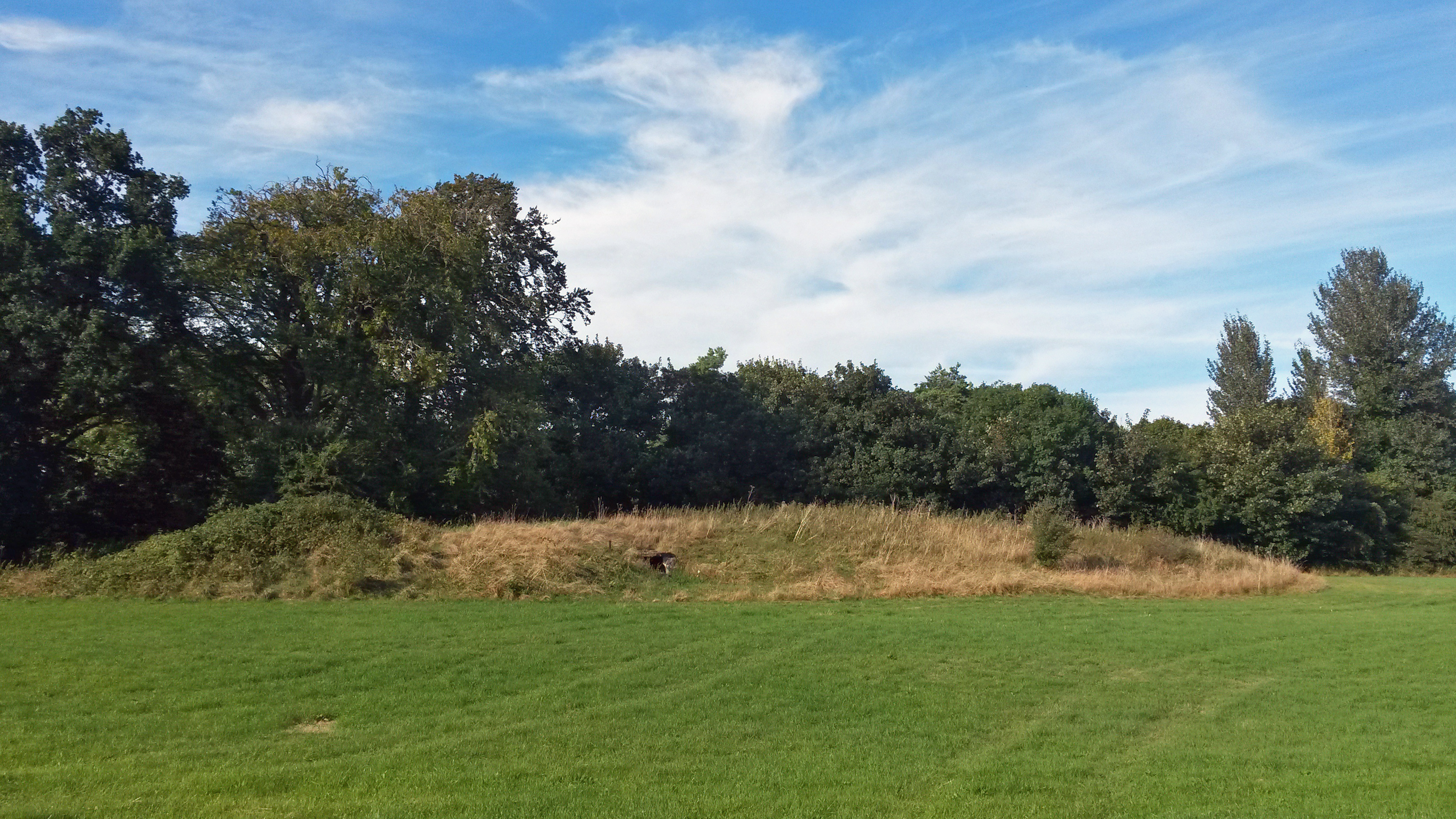
Lanhill Long Barrow, viewed from the south with chamber entrance visible

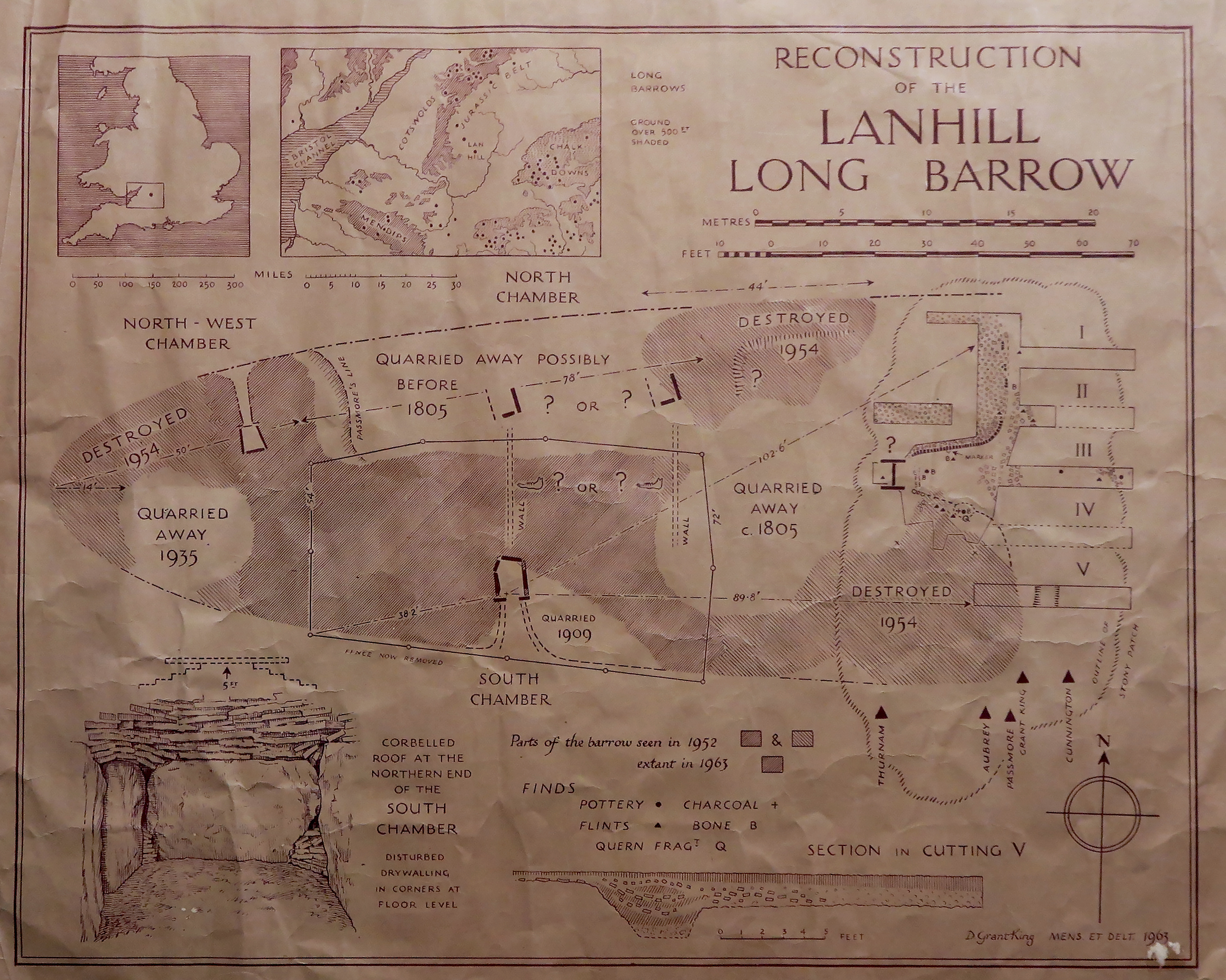
Plan of Lanhill Long Barrow in Wiltshire, England, drawn by Denis Grant King, 1963 - photograph courtesy of Chippenham Museum and Heritage Centre

In 1959 Grant King headed an excavation at Bury Camp, an Iron Age Hill Fort located just outside North Wraxall, Wiltshire. His work as a teacher for the Extramural Department at the University of Bristol, as well as other outdoors groups, enabled him to source a team of volunteers dubbed the “Bury Wood Excavation Club”. He published a series of excavation reports for Wiltshire Archaeological and Natural History Magazine.

Another project was Lanhill Long Barrow (known locally as Hubba's Low). The barrow had been recorded by John Aubrey in 1647, but was subsequently largely obliterated through quarrying and invasive excavation. In 1954 the Ministry of Works gave permission for Lanhill to be cleared of brambles. Grant King wrote several letters of complaint to the Ministry and other heritage organisations, highlighting the damage caused by using a bulldozer to undertake the clearance. Ultimately, King lead an excavation in 1963 to record the barrow. He called upon his Bury Wood Excavation Club to assist in rebuilding many of the damaged areas. Through painstaking investigation he was able to construct a plan of the barrow.

== Later work ==
In his later years Grant King became increasingly concerned with the effects of development on the historic landscape of Wiltshire. In 1972 he convened the Ridgeway Conservation Conference, to protect the ancient trackway from traffic damage. He opposed aspects of the Salisbury ring road and the negligent treatment of medieval buildings in Devizes. He also protested against the proposed road straightening that would compromise the Neolithic site of Durrington Walls, and his letters to the highway authorities were full of strongly worded rhetoric; “the consensus of learned opinion throughout the world is against you”, he wrote.

He died in Devizes on 23 February 1994.
