= Irish famine (disambiguation) =

The Great Famine (Ireland) (1845–49) is sometimes referred to as the Irish Potato Famine or an Gorta Mór.

Irish famine may also refer to:

- Irish Famine (1740–41), known in Irish as Bliain an Áir, "Year of Slaughter"
- Irish Famine (1861)
- Irish Famine (1879), sometimes called the "mini-famine" or an Gorta Beag
- Irish food shortages (1925), a major food shortage in parts of western Ireland, sometimes considered a famine

== Other ==
- The Irish Famine (book), 2001 book by Diarmaid Ferriter and Colm Tóibín
- Legacy of the Great Irish Famine
