= Glen Lough =

Lake in County Donegal, Ireland

- Loch an Ghleanna (Irish)
- Location in Ireland
- Location: County Donegal
- Coordinates: 55°6′43″N 7°50′15″W
- Lake type: Glacial lake
- Primary inflows: Owencarrow River
- Primary outflows: Lackagh River
- Catchment area: 124.22 km^{2} (48.0 sq mi)
- Basin countries: Ireland
- Max. length: 3.4 km (2 mi)
- Max. width: 0.5 km (0.3 mi)
- Surface area: 1.68 km^{2} (0.65 sq mi)
- Average depth: 4.9 m (16 ft)
- Max. depth: 21 m (69 ft)
- Surface elevation: 27 m (89 ft)

Glen Lough (Irish: Loch an Ghleanna) is a freshwater lake in the northwest of Ireland. It is located in north County Donegal near the village of Creeslough.

== Geography ==
Glen Lough is about 5 kilometres (3 mi) east of Creeslough. It measures about 3 km (2 mi) long and 0.5 km (0.3 mi) wide and lies just north of Lough Beagh and Glenveagh National Park. The Derryveagh Mountains begin on the lake's western side and the Glendowan Mountains begin on the lake's southern end.

== Hydrology ==
Glen Lough is fed mainly by the Owencarrow River entering at its southern end. The lake drains northwards into the Lackagh River, which in turn enters Sheephaven Bay. The Owencarrow connects the lake with its southern neighbour, Lough Beagh.

== Natural history ==
Fish species in Glen Lough include brown trout (including sea trout), Arctic char, salmon, minnow and the critically endangered European eel.

== See also ==
- List of loughs in Ireland
