= Glenveagh =

National park in Ireland

Glenveagh National Park
- Páirc Náisiúnta Ghleann Bheatha
- IUCN category II (national park)
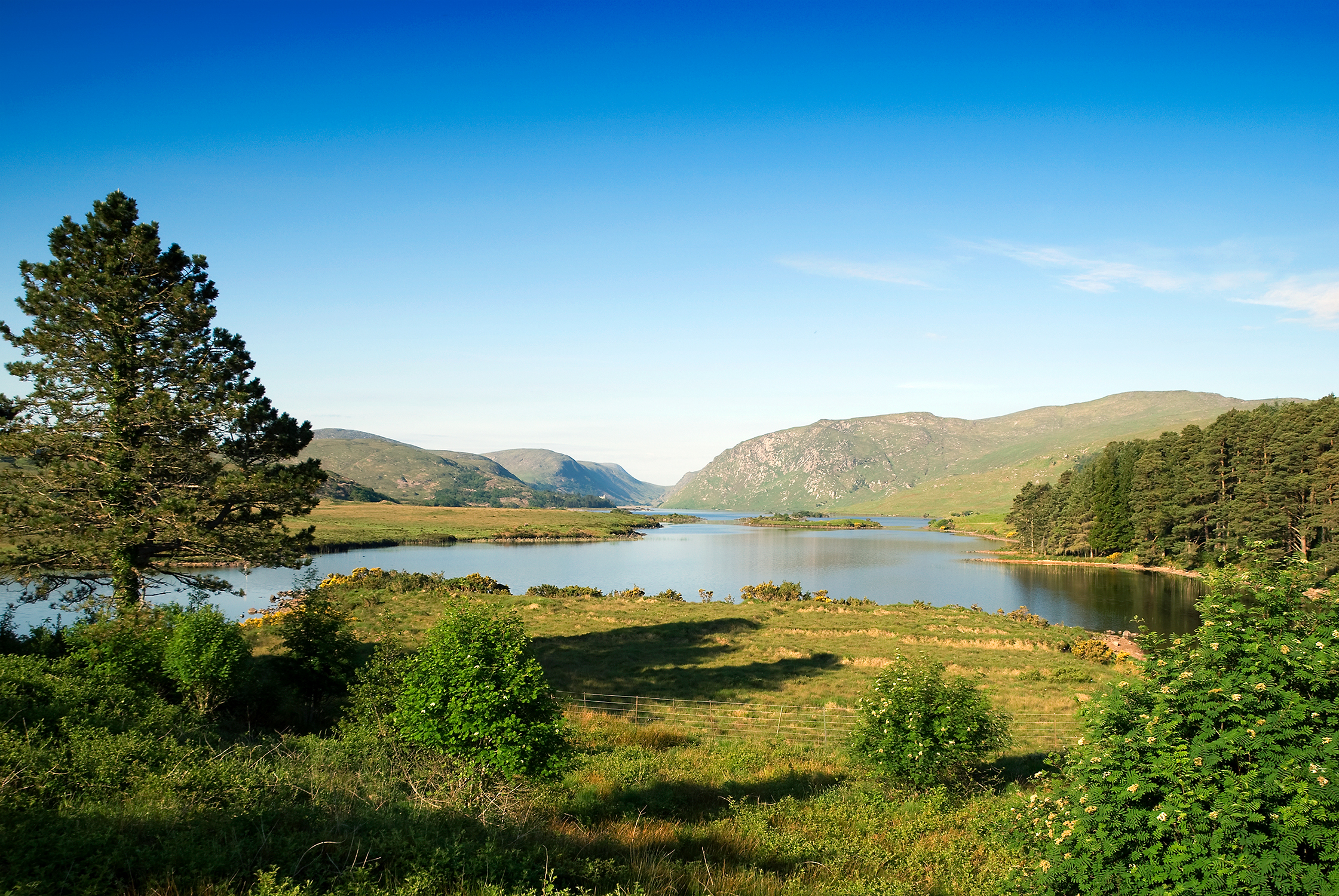
- Lough Veagh at Glenveagh
- Interactive map of Glenveagh National Park
- Location: County Donegal, Ulster, Ireland
- Nearest town: Letterkenny
- Coordinates: 55°01′N 8°00′W
- Area: 169.58 km^{2} (65.48 sq mi)
- Established: 1986
- Governing body: NPWS National Parks and Wildlife Service

National Parks in Ireland

Glenveagh (/ɡlɛnˈveɪ/ glen-VAY; Irish: Gleann Bheatha, meaning 'glen of the birches') is the second-largest national park in all of Ireland. Located in County Donegal, it includes: Glenveagh Castle and its grounds; Lough Veagh; and much of the Derryveagh Mountains. National parks in Ireland conform to IUCN standards. As of 2024, Glenveagh is the only national park anywhere in Ulster, the northern province in Ireland.

== Geography ==
The park covers 170 square kilometres and includes much of the Derryveagh Mountains, Lough Veagh and Glenveagh Castle on its shores. The castle gardens display a multitude of exotic and delicate plants.

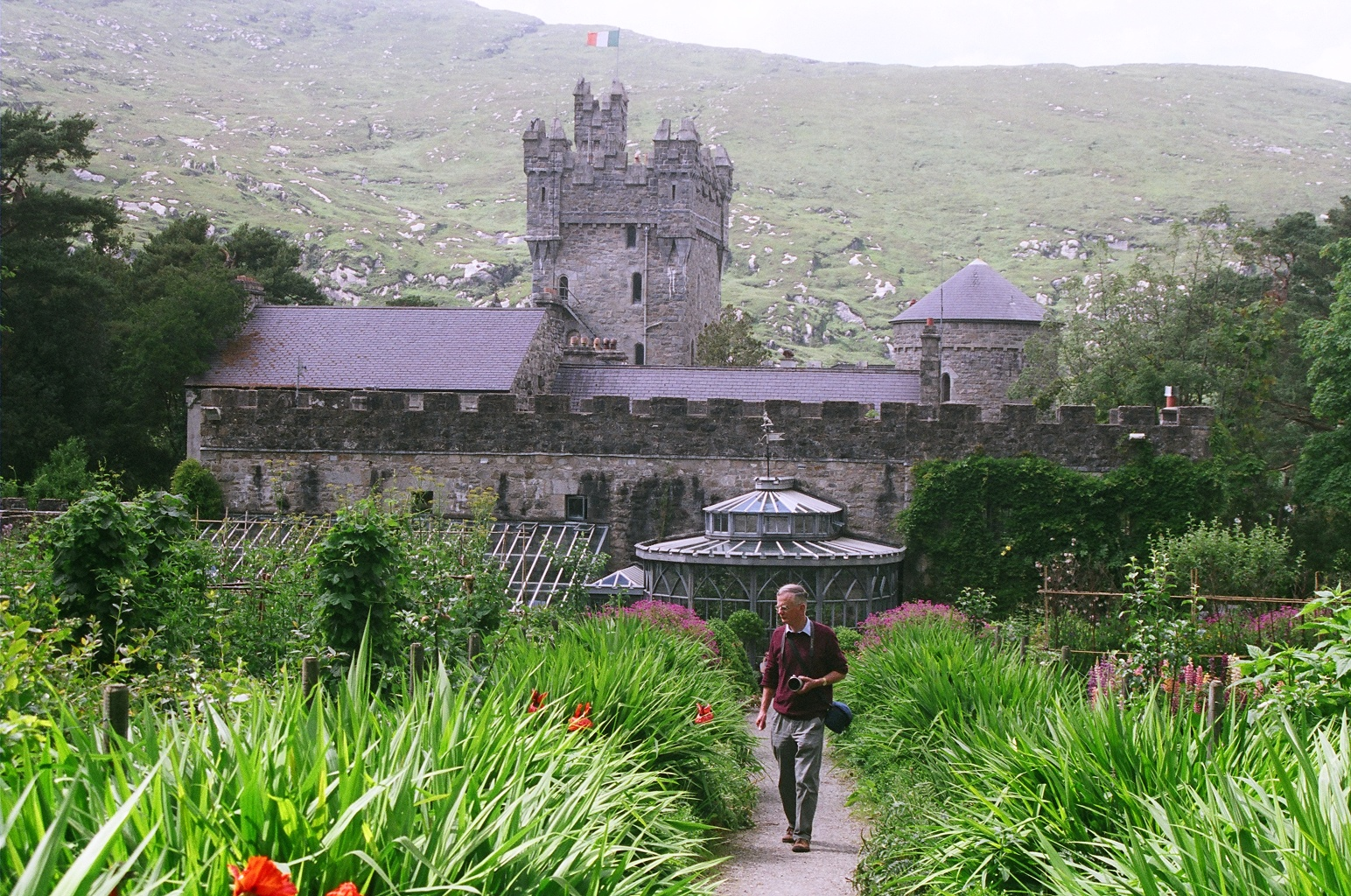
Castle and gardens

== History ==
Captain John George Adair (1823–1885), an Anglo-Irish businessman, built Glenveagh Castle and founded the Glenveagh estate. Adair came into dispute with his Irish Catholic tenants over hunting and fishing rights and trespassing sheep. During the 1861 famine, Adair evicted 44 families (224 people total) from their blackhouses on his land, earning him the nickname "Black Jack Adair".

The estate passed to his wife Cornelia Adair. It was then bought by Arthur Kingsley Porter in 1929, before being bought by Henry Plumer McIlhenny in 1937. McIlhenny bequeathed Glenveagh to the Irish state in the 1970s, but continued to use the castle as a part-time residence until 1982.

The park is home to the largest herd of red deer in Ireland and the formerly extirpated golden eagle were reintroduced into the park in 2000. In winter 2018 and spring 2019, many native and non-native trees and plants were cleared from the park, and the water and pipe system was updated.

== See also ==
- List of loughs in Ireland
- List of tourist attractions in Ireland
