= Dundee cake =

Scottish fruit cake

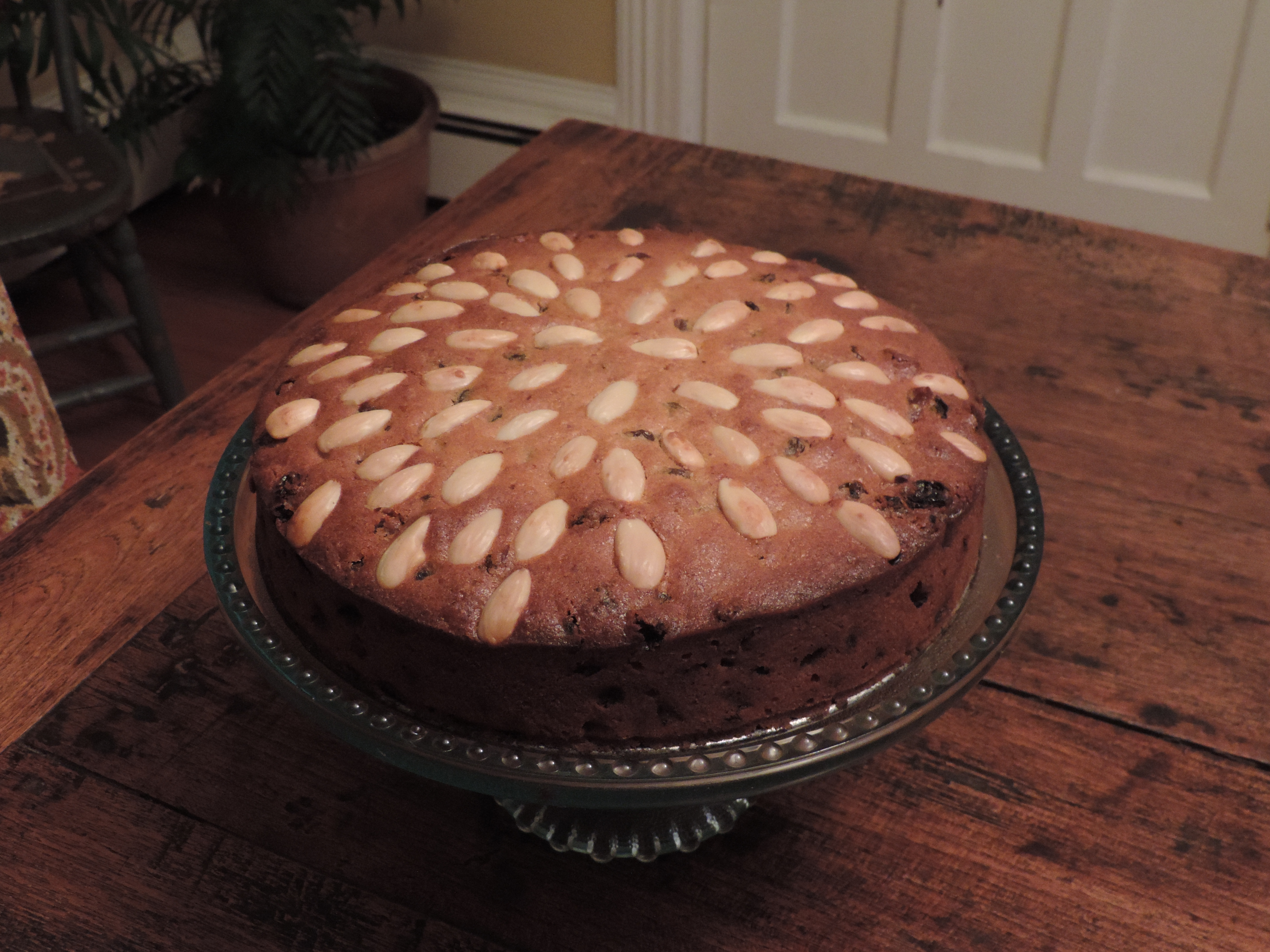
- A Dundee cake, distinctive for the almonds used as decoration
- Type: Fruit cake
- Place of origin: Scotland
- Region or state: Dundee
- Created by: Keiller's marmalade
- Main ingredients: orange peel, sultanas and almonds

Dundee cake is a traditional Scottish fruit cake.

== Ingredients ==
Dundee cake recipes often incorporate ingredients like butter, sugar, lemon zest, orange zest, marmalade, flour, baking powder, eggs, milk, dried fruit, glacé cherries, candied citrus peel, currants, sultanas, ground almonds and, finally, blanched almonds for a decorative finish. The only ingredients allowed according to the Protected Geographical Indication (PGI) application for Dundee cake are as follows: salted butter, sugar (caster, granulated, light or dark soft brown), eggs, thick peel Seville oranges (concentrated or other), finely grated orange zest, plain cake flour, sherry (optional), ground almonds (optional), sultanas, whole blanched almonds or split almonds.

== History ==
The original commercial development of the cake began in Dundee in the late 18th century in the shop of Janet Keiller but according to legend was originally made for Mary, Queen of Scots in the 16th century. It was mass-produced by the marmalade company Keiller's marmalade who have been claimed to be the originators of the term "Dundee cake". However, similar fruit cakes were produced throughout Scotland. A popular story is that Mary Queen of Scots did not like glacé cherries in her cakes, so the cake was first made for her, as a fruit cake that used blanched almonds and not cherries. The top of the cake is typically decorated with concentric circles of almonds. The cakes are sold in United Kingdom supermarkets.

The cake was also made and marketed in British India, and in independent India after 1947, by Britannia Industries and its successor firms. After 1980, the cake was withdrawn from the market; however, it continued to be supplied privately as a corporate Christmas gift by the maker.

== Recognition ==
Queen Elizabeth II was reported to favour Dundee cake at tea-time.

In The Gathering Storm, Winston Churchill is depicted as a fan of the Dundee cake.

== See also ==
- Scottish cuisine
