= Bernice McIlhenny Wintersteen =

American arts administrator

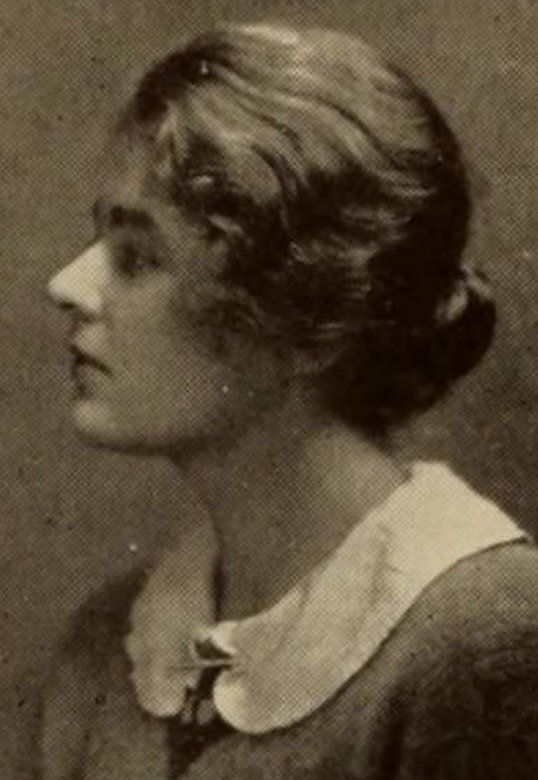
- Bernice McIlhenny (later Wintersteen), from the 1925 yearbook of Smith College
- Born: Bernice Marilla McIlhenny; June 16, 1903; Philadelphia, Pennsylvania
- Died: April 24, 1986 (aged 82); Philadelphia, Pennsylvania
- Other name: Bonnie Wintersteen
- Occupation: Arts administrator
- Relatives: Henry Plumer McIlhenny (brother)

Bernice Marilla McIlhenny Wintersteen (June 16, 1903 – April 24, 1986) was an American arts patron and arts administrator. She was president of the Philadelphia Museum of Art from 1964 to 1968.

== Early life and education ==
Bernice "Bonnie" McIlhenny was born in Philadelphia, the daughter of John Dexter McIlhenny and Frances Galbraith Plumer McIlhenny. Her father was an executive in the utilities industry. Her younger brother Henry Plumer McIhenny was a noted art collector, curator, and philanthropist. She studied art with Arthur Beecher Carles, and graduated from Smith College in 1925. In 1981 she was awarded the Smith College Medal, as an outstanding alumna.

== Career ==
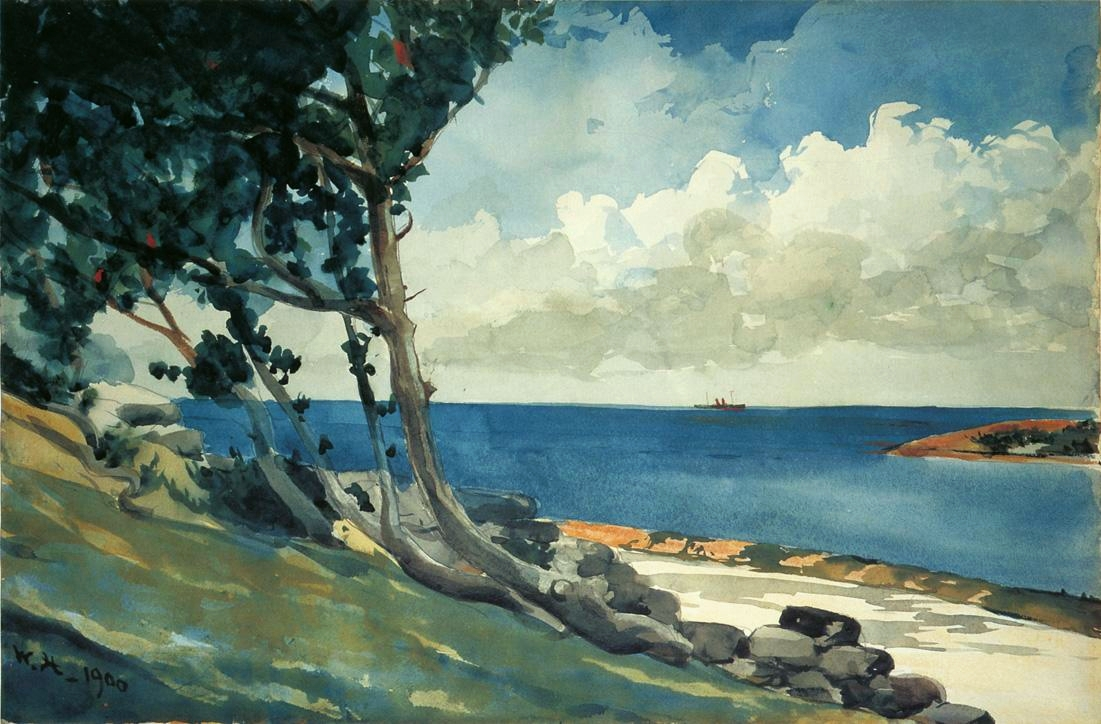
Winslow Homer, "North Road, Bermuda"; one painting donated by Bernice McIlhenny Wintersteen to the Pennsylvania Academy of the Fine Arts

Wintersteen was a member of the Board of Governors of the Philadelphia Museum of Art from 1937 to 1964, chair of the Board of Governors from 1959 to 1964, and president of the museum from 1964 to 1968. In 1969, the Bernice McIlhenny Wintersteen Student Center opened at the museum. She sold much of her art collections in the 1970s, but donated some paintings to the museum, and to the Pennsylvania Academy of the Fine Arts, including paintings, pastels, and statues from Picasso, Matisse, Degas, Toulouse-Lautrec, O'Keeffe, Nevelson, Rothko, and Bronzino.

Wintersteen was named a Distinguished Daughter of Pennsylvania in 1964. She received the Gimbel Philadelphia Award in 1967. She chaired the Philadelphia Art Festival in 1967, and was president of the Friends of the Wissahickon from 1953 to 1956. She served on the advisory council of the Princeton University Museum of Art, chaired the visitors' committee of the Smith College Art Museum. She was also "the first woman elected an honorary fellow of the Philadelphia College of Physicians." She was a trustee of Drexel University, and served on the Bicentennial Committee of the city of Philadelphia. Illustrator Jessie Willcox Smith painted a portrait of Bonnie McIlhenny as a girl; Andy Warhol photographed her in her seventies.

== Personal life ==
Bernice McIlhenny married lawyer John S. Wintersteen in 1929. They had four sons. Her husband died in 1952, and she died in 1986, at the age of 82, in Philadelphia. Her papers are in the archives of the Philadelphia Museum of Art.
