= Lough Beagh =

Lake in County Donegal, Ireland

- Loch Ghleann Bheatha (Irish)
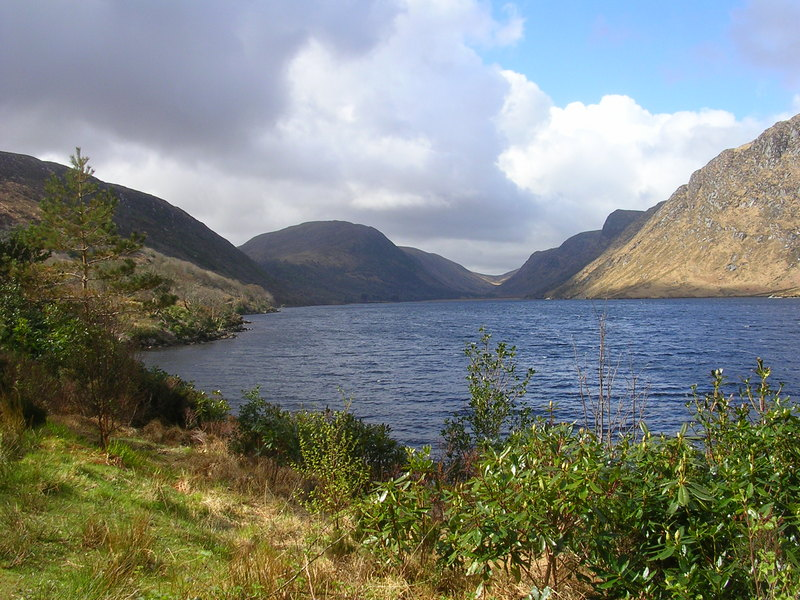

- Location in Ireland
- Location: County Donegal
- Coordinates: 55°2′24″N 7°58′22″W
- Lake type: Glacial lake
- Primary inflows: Owenbeagh River
- Primary outflows: Owencarrow River
- Catchment area: 36.88 km^{2} (14.2 sq mi)
- Basin countries: Ireland
- Max. length: 6.5 km (4 mi)
- Max. width: 0.8 km (0.5 mi)
- Surface area: 2.61 km^{2} (1.01 sq mi)
- Average depth: 9.2 m (30 ft)
- Max. depth: 46.5 m (153 ft)
- Surface elevation: 45.3 m (149 ft)

Lough Beagh (Irish: Loch Ghleann Bheatha), also known as Lough Veagh, is a freshwater lake in the northwest of Ireland. It is located in north County Donegal and is part of Glenveagh National Park.

== Geography ==
Lough Beagh is about 24 kilometres (15 mi) northwest of Letterkenny. It measures about 6 km (3.7 mi) long and 1 km (0.6 mi) wide and lies in the narrow Glenveagh valley surrounded by the Derryveagh and Glendowan Mountains. Steep granite cliffs rise on both sides of the lake to heights of about 300 m (1,000 ft). The lake has numerous small islands at its northern end.

== Hydrology ==
Lough Beagh is fed mainly by the Owenbeagh River entering at its southern end. The lake drains northwards into the Owencarrow River. The Owencarrow connects the lake with its similar northern neighbour, Glen Lough.

== Natural history ==
Fish species in Lough Beagh include brown trout (including sea trout), Arctic char, salmon, minnow and the critically endangered European eel. Bird life includes the migrating red-throated diver and the reintroduced golden eagle.

== History ==
The lake is mentioned in the Annals of the Four Masters, where in about 1540 sons of Ó Domnaill "held the crannog of Loch Veagh and from it were greatly troubling the country".

== See also ==
- List of loughs in Ireland
