= Doris Emerson Chapman =

British artist and prehistorian

Doris Emerson Chapman (1903 – 1990) was a British artist and prehistorian. She trained in Paris and then exhibited paintings in London during the 1920s and 1930s. She was associated with the Bloomsbury Group. She then joined the Morven Institute of Archaeological Research to draw the megaliths of Avebury and produced measured drawings as they were excavated. In 1939 she wrote a guidebook titled Is This Your First Visit to Avebury?.

She also pioneered artistic facial reconstruction from skulls and in 1939 she published several illustrations of individuals from Lanhill long barrow in The Illustrated London News.

== Personal life ==
Chapman had a relationship with the author, psychoanalyst, and younger brother of Virginia Woolf, Adrian Stephen. Later, after joining the excavation team led by Alexander Keiller at Avebury and Lanhill long barrow in 1934, Chapman married Keiller. A drawing of Keiller made by Chapman in 1934 is held in the collection of the National Portrait Gallery, London. The couple became increasingly estranged from the beginning of the war, when the Institute closed, although they would not divorce until 1951.

Chapman became a nurse in London and then married again in 1951, becoming Doris Chalmers.
