= Henry Plumer McIlhenny =

American art collector and curator (1910–1986)

- Born: October 10, 1910; Philadelphia, Pennsylvania, U.S.
- Died: May 11, 1986 (aged 75)
- Resting place: West Laurel Hill Cemetery, Bala Cynwyd, Pennsylvania, U.S.
- Education: Harvard University
- Occupation: Curator of the decorative arts for the Philadelphia Museum of Art
- Relatives: Bernice McIlhenny Wintersteen (sister)

Henry Plumer McIlhenny (October 10, 1910 – May 11, 1986) was an American art collector, philanthropist, and curator of the decorative arts for the Philadelphia Museum of Art from 1939 to 1964. He served as a trustee in 1964, as vice president from 1968 to 1976, and as chairman of the board of trustees from 1976 to 1986. He bequeathed his art collection, valued at US$100 million at the time of his death, to the Philadelphia Museum of Art and Glenveagh Castle, his summer home, to the Republic of Ireland to establish Glenveagh National Park.

== Early life and education ==
McIlhenny was born October 10, 1910, in Philadelphia to John and Frances (Plumer) McIlenny. His grandfather was an Irish immigrant who invented a gas meter which made the family extremely wealthy. His father was president of the Philadelphia Art Museum. Henry attended Episcopal Academy in Pennsylvania and Milton Academy in Massachusetts.

He graduated magna cum laude from Harvard University with a degree in Fine arts in 1933. He studied under Paul J. Sachs for a graduate degree in art history at the Fogg Art Museum.

== Career ==
In the 1930s, he began a collection of French paintings including ones from Jean Siméon Chardin and Edgar Degas' Interior along with 18th- and 19th-century silver, furniture, and other decorative arts. Many acquisitions were made through his interior designers Denning & Fourcade of New York City and Paris.

The collection included paintings from Paul Cézanne, Jacques-Louis David, Jean-Auguste-Dominique Ingres, Henri Matisse, and Pierre-Auguste Renoir. It also included the 1844 version of The Death of Sardanapalus by Eugène Delacroix; At the Moulin Rouge, The Dance by Henri de Toulouse-Lautrec; and Rain by Vincent van Gogh.

McIlhenny began working at the Philadelphia Museum of Art as assistant curator of the decorative arts under Fiske Kimball. He was promoted to associate curator of decorative arts in 1937 and served as a curator of the decorative arts starting in 1939.. He received a salary of $1 a year for his work.

McIlhenny purchased Glenveagh Castle in County Donegal,Ireland, in 1938

In 1938, McIlhenny purchased Glenveagh Castle and 25,000 acres in County Donegal, Ireland. He had rented during the summers since 1933, and used it regularly as a part-time residence until 1982. He decorated the castle with Victorian art and paintings from Richard Ansdell and Edwin Landseer.

From 1942 to 1946, he served as a lieutenant junior grade in the United States Navy Reserve during World War II. He saw active duty aboard the USS Bunker Hill in the Pacific for which he and the crew earned a Presidential Unit Citation. He was honorably discharged in 1954 at the rank of lieutenant commander.

From 1947 to 1948, he took a leave of absence from the Philadelphia Museum of Art and the United States Navy Reserve and worked as the resident art historian at the American Academy in Rome.

In 1950, he sold the family home in the Germantown neighborhood of Philadelphia and purchased a townhouse in the Rittenhouse Square neighborhood. He decorated the townhouse with his collection of French art. He eventually purchased the two adjoining townhouses and built a ballroom and courtyard for social gatherings.

His collection of art was displayed at the Philadelphia Museum of Art in 1949, the California Palace of The Legion of Honor in 1962, the Allentown Art Museum in 1977, and the High Museum of Art in Atlanta in 1979.

He resigned from the curator position in 1963, served as a trustee in 1964, as vice president from 1968 to 1976, and as chairman of the board of trustees from 1976 until 1986.

In order to fund renovations to his properties, he sold a painting by Georges Seurat in 1970, one by Pierre-Auguste Renoir in 1973, and one by Paul Cézanne in 1983. The Cezanne sold for US$3.6 million.

The Connoisseur magazine listed him as one of the United States' all-time top 10 art collectors. In 1974, he was interviewed by the Archives of American Art for their oral history program. In 1984, he was featured on a television program by the BBC titled "The Great Collectors".

He served on the boards for the Philadelphia Academy of Music, Philadelphia Orchestra, and the Philadelphia Society for the Preservation of Landmarks. Almost 200 other local organizations benefitted from his support.

== Personal life ==
A lifelong bachelor, McIlhenny was homosexual. Andy Warhol claimed that McIlhenny was "the only person in Philadelphia with glamour," a sentiment echoed by the Philadelphia Art Alliance, which dubbed him the "first gentleman of Philadelphia."

McIlhenny has an indirect connection with the Death Mask Murder. In what The New York Times dubbed a "glamorous conquest," McIlhenny was reported to have hired a young Andrew Crispo as a prostitute when Crispo was still "turning tricks in Rittenhouse Square." McIlhenny deepened their connection by "tutor[ing] Mr. Crispo in art" and "finding him an apt pupil." Andrew Crispo would go on to become the "disgraced manhattan gallery owner...involved [in] murder, torture, tax evasion, extortion, and two terms in prison" in part for his role in the "Death Mask Murder," a "bizarre sadomasochistic scenario created by Mr. Crispo" and his assistant which resulted in the murder of Norwegian student Eigil Dag Vesti.

His older sister Bernice McIlhenny Wintersteen was president of the Philadelphia Museum of Art in the 1960s. to 1986.

== Death and legacy ==
McIlhenny died on May 11, 1986, in Philadelphia after undergoing heart surgery. He was interred at West Laurel Hill Cemetery in Bala Cynwyd, Pennsylvania. At the time of his death, his art collection was valued at $100 million. He had no heirs and left his entire estate to the Philadelphia Museum of Art.

Items from McIlhenny's collection that were not retained for the Philadelphia Museum of Art's collection were sold by Christie's at a two-day sale that raised US$3.7 million. Before the sales, 200 guests gathered at Christie's for a benefit dinner in McIlhenny's honor.

McIlhenny made a gift of Glenveagh Castle and gardens to the Republic of Ireland in 1979, while retaining the right to live there for his lifetime. He had previously sold the bulk of the estate lands to the Irish state in 1974–75, to enable the creation of Glenveagh National Park.
