= James S. Wadsworth =

Union Army officer in the American Civil War

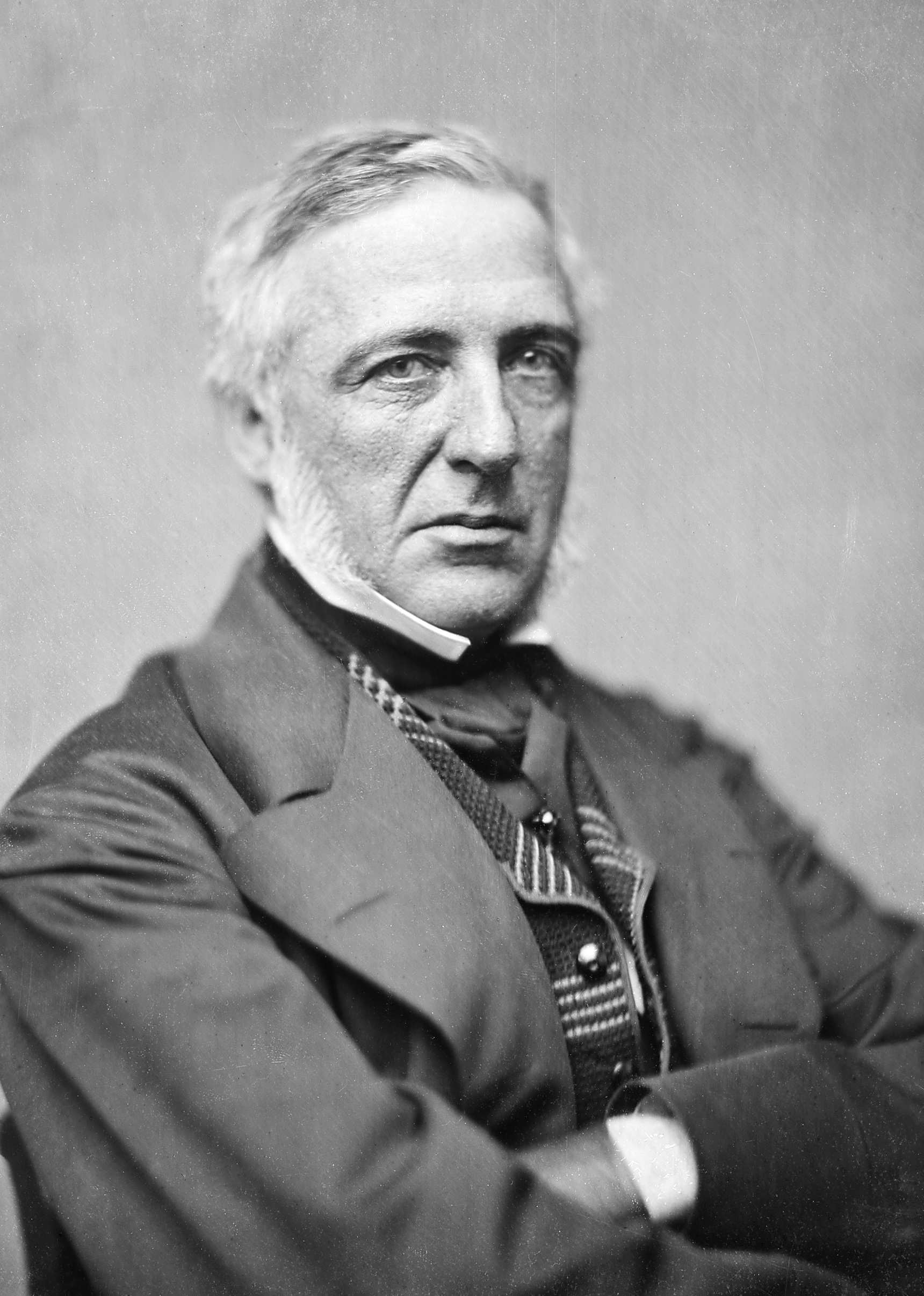
- Born: James Samuel Wadsworth; October 30, 1807; Geneseo, New York
- Died: May 8, 1864 (aged 56); Spotsylvania County, Virginia
- Burial place: Temple Hill Cemetery, Geneseo, New York
- Military career
- Allegiance: United States of America; Union
- Branch: United States Army; Union Army
- Service years: 1861–1864
- Rank: Brevet Major General
- Conflicts: American Civil War: Battle of Gettysburg; Battle of the Wilderness

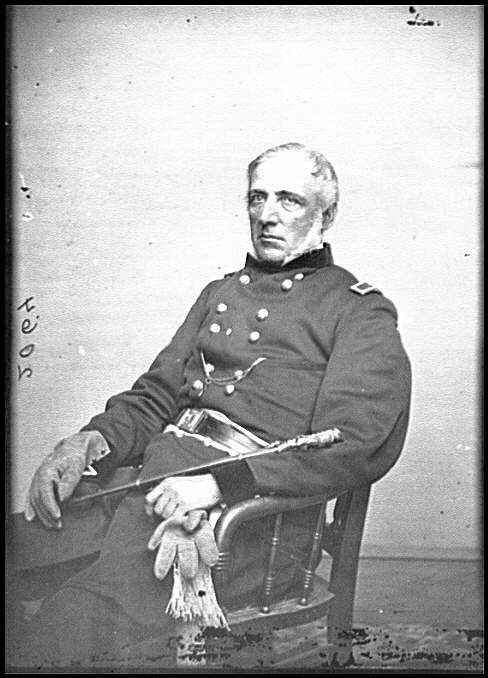
James S. Wadsworth. Photo from the Library of Congress

James Samuel Wadsworth (October 30, 1807 – May 8, 1864) was a philanthropist, politician, and a Union general in the American Civil War. He was mortally wounded at the Battle of the Wilderness in 1864.

== Early years ==
Wadsworth was born to wealthy parents in Geneseo in Livingston County in western New York State. His father, James Wadsworth, was the owner of one of the largest portfolios of cultivated land in the state, and young Wadsworth was groomed to fulfill the responsibilities he would inherit. He attended both Harvard University and Yale University, studied law, and was admitted to the bar, but had no intention of practicing. He spent the majority of his life managing his family's estate. Wadsworth built Hartford House in Geneseo, New York, upon his marriage in 1834 to the former Mary Craig Wharton of Philadelphia.

He was president of the New York State Agricultural Society in 1842 and 1843.

Out of a sense of noblesse oblige, he became a philanthropist and entered politics, first as a Democrat, but then as one of the organizers of the Free Soil Party, which joined the Republican Party in 1856. In the 1860 presidential election, he was a presidential elector for Abraham Lincoln and Hannibal Hamlin. In 1861, he was a member of the Washington peace conference, an unofficial gathering of Northern and Southern moderates who attempted to avert war. But after war became inevitable, he considered it his duty to volunteer.

== Civil War service ==
Despite his complete lack of military experience at the outbreak of the Civil War, Wadsworth was commissioned a major general in the New York state militia in May 1861. He served as a civilian volunteer aide-de-camp to Maj. Gen. Irvin McDowell at the First Battle of Bull Run on July 8. McDowell recommended him for command and, on August 9, Wadsworth was commissioned a brigadier general; on October 3 he received command of the 2nd Brigade in McDowell's Division of the Army of the Potomac. He then led the 2nd Brigade, 3rd Division, of the I Corps of the army until March 17.

From March 17 to September 7, 1862, Wadsworth commanded the Military District of Washington. During the preparations for Maj. Gen. George B. McClellan's Peninsula Campaign, Wadsworth complained to President Abraham Lincoln that he had insufficient troops to defend the capital due to McClellan's plan to take a large number of them with him to the Virginia Peninsula. Lincoln countermanded McClellan's plan and restored a full corps to the Washington defenses, generating ill feelings between McClellan and Wadsworth. Seeing no prospects for serving in McClellan's army, Wadsworth allowed his name to be put into nomination for governor of New York against antiwar Democrat Horatio Seymour, but he declined to leave active duty to campaign and lost the election.

After McClellan left the Army of the Potomac, and after the serious Union defeat at the Battle of Fredericksburg, Wadsworth was appointed commander of the 1st Division, I Corps on December 27, 1862, replacing Brig. Gen. John Gibbon, who had been promoted to command of the 2nd Division in the II Corps. He led this division until June 15, 1863, with two brief stints commanding the I Corps in January and March for about ten days combined.

Wadsworth and his division's first test in combat was at the Battle of Chancellorsville in May 1863. He made a faltering start in maneuvering his men across the Rappahannock River below Fredericksburg and they ended up being only lightly engaged during the battle. His performance at the Battle of Gettysburg was much more substantial. Arriving in the vanguard of Maj. Gen. John F. Reynolds's I Corps on July 1, 1863, Wadsworth's division bore much of the brunt of the overwhelming Confederate attack that morning and afternoon. They were able to hold out against attacks from both the west and north, providing the time to bring up sufficient forces to hold the high ground south of town and eventually win the battle. But by the time the division retreated back through town to Cemetery Hill that evening, it had suffered over 50% casualties. Despite these losses, on the second day of battle, Wadsworth's division was assigned to the defense of part of Culp's Hill. When most of XII Corps was ordered to the left flank of the army, Wadsworth sent three regiments to reinforce the brigade of Brig. Gen. George S. Greene, which was holding the summit of the hill.

I Corps had been so significantly damaged at Gettysburg that, when the Army of the Potomac was reorganized in March 1864, its surviving regiments were dispersed to other corps. After an eight-month leave of absence, much of it spent inspecting colored troops on duty in the Mississippi Valley, Wadsworth was named commander of the 4th Division, V Corps, composed of troops from his old division formerly led by Maj. Gen. Abner Doubleday.

=== The Wilderness and death ===
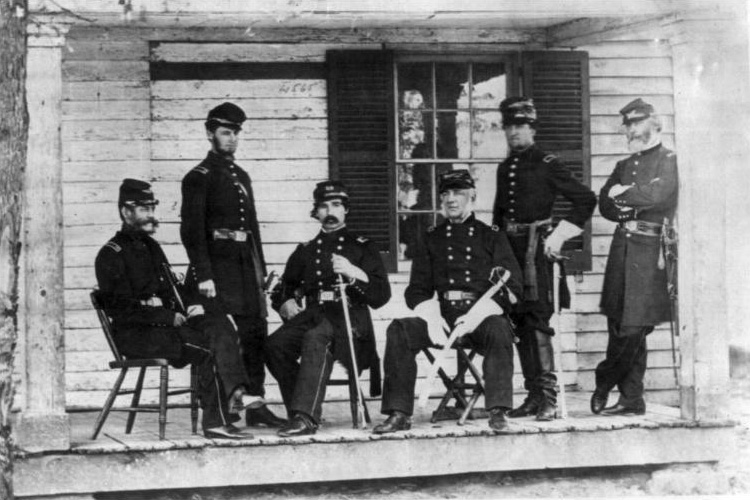
Brig. Gen. Wadsworth (seated, far right) and his staff

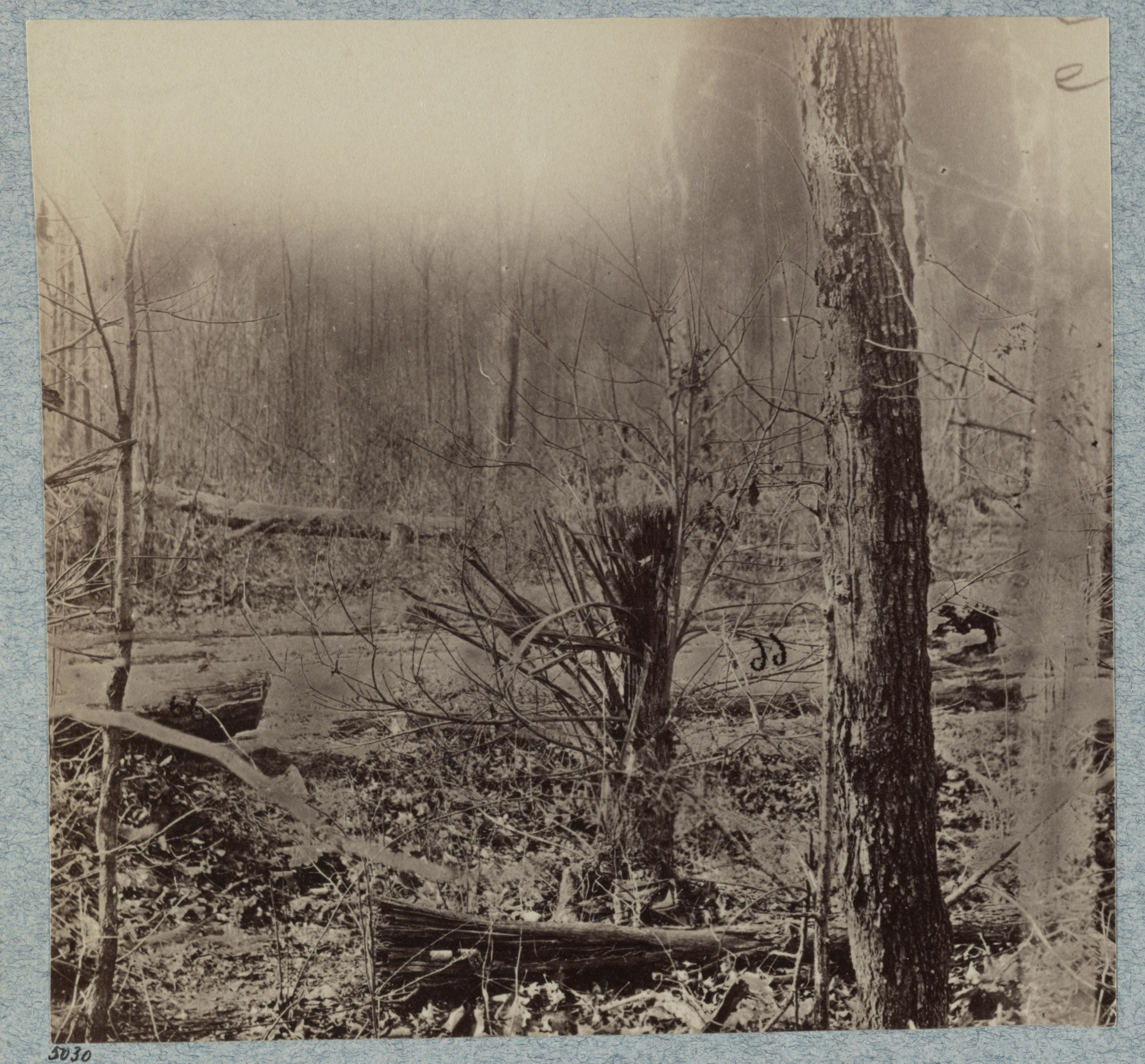
Scene of General Wadsworth's death. Tree in foreground was shattered by shell that killed his horse.

At the start of Lt. Gen. Ulysses S. Grant's 1864 Overland Campaign, Wadsworth led his division in Maj. Gen. Gouverneur K. Warren's V Corps at the Battle of the Wilderness. On this day Wadsworth was Grant's oldest divisional commander at 56 years old, about nine years older than the next oldest. On May 5, Wadsworth was ordered to counter march and help defend the left of the Union position. However, he had lost his direction in the dense Wilderness underbrush and drifted to the north, exposing the left of his division to a sudden and harsh attack, which in turn led to the same treatment of the Union division next to Wadsworth.

Wadsworth was mortally wounded on May 6, trying to turn his two intact brigades (his other brigade had collided with the Federal units on his left and lost cohesion) when he was shot in the head. Wadsworth fell from his horse. Passing Confederate soldiers looted his body of any valuables—John Belote of the 6th Virginia got Wadsworth's pocket watch, which he returned to the general's widow after the war. Eventually the stricken Wadsworth was taken to a Confederate field hospital but there was not much to be done for him. The bullet entered the top left of his head. Wadsworth was still alive and seen to play with a couple of muskets used to construct a makeshift litter but he did not appear to be aware of his surroundings and attempts to give him food were unsuccessful. He died on the afternoon of May 8. George Meade sent a letter to Robert E. Lee under a flag of truce requesting the return of the body but Lee replied that that was impossible with an active campaign going on. While the high command of the two armies continued to bicker back and forth, the enlisted men came to an agreement on their own initiative. Wadsworth's body was handed over by Confederate troops on May 12 well before Meade or Lee knew about it. Wadsworth's son-in-law, Montgomery Harrison Ritchie, went into the Confederate camp to retrieve his body.

The day before he was wounded, he was promoted to major general, but this appointment was withdrawn and he received instead a posthumous brevet promotion to major general as of May 6, 1864, for his service at Gettysburg and the Wilderness.

Wadsworth's remains were brought back to Geneseo, New York, and buried there in Temple Hill Cemetery.

== Legacy ==
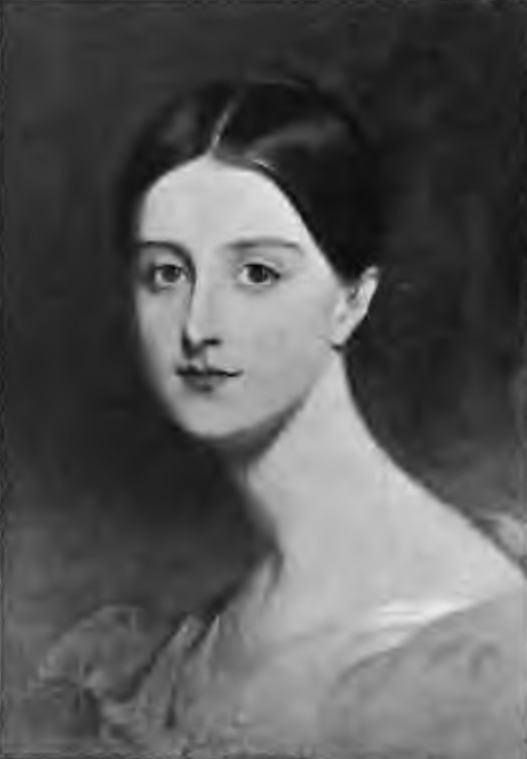
Mary Craig Wharton Wadsworth

Weeks after his father-in-law's death, Montgomery Ritchie died of disease contracted in battle. Fort Wadsworth in South Dakota was named for him in 1864. Fort Wadsworth on Staten Island, one of the defenses of New York Harbor, also is named for the general; it is in the shadow of the Verrazzano–Narrows Bridge. Wadsworth, Nevada, was also named in his honor.

He married Mary Craig Wharton on May 11, 1834, in Geneseo, Livingston County, New York.

- Their daughter Cornelia Wadsworth Ritchie Adair (1837–1921) became prominent as matriarch of Glenveagh Castle in County Donegal, Ireland, and the large JA Ranch in the Texas Panhandle.
- Their son, James Wolcott Wadsworth Sr. (1846–1926), and grandson, James Wolcott Wadsworth Jr., were successful New York politicians.
- Their younger daughter, Elizabeth S. Wadsworth (1848–1930), married firstly Arthur Post in 1875, and secondly in 1889, as a widow, Arthur Smith-Barry, 1st Baron Barrymore (1843–1925), becoming Lady Barrymore. Through this marriage, he was grandfather to Anglo-Irish aristocrat Dorothy Bell.

== See also ==
- List of American Civil War generals (Union)

== Notes ==
Party political offices
Preceded by Edwin D. Morgan	Republican nominee for Governor of New York; 1862	Succeeded by Reuben Fenton
Military offices
Preceded by John F. Reynolds	Commander of the I Corps (Army of the Potomac); January 2, 1863 – January 4, 1863	Succeeded by John F. Reynolds
Preceded by John F. Reynolds	Commander of the I Corps (Army of the Potomac); March 1, 1863 – March 9, 1863	Succeeded by John F. Reynolds
Preceded by John Newton	Commander of the I Corps (Army of the Potomac); March 12, 1864 – March 14, 1864	Succeeded by John Newton
