= Bury Camp =

Iron Age hillfort in Wiltshire, England

- Bury Wood Camp, or North Wood
- Location within Wiltshire
- 51.4647°N 2.2634°W
- Periods: Iron Age
- Location: Wiltshire, England

Site notes
- Archaeologists: Denis Grant-King
- Condition: good
- Public access: yes

Identifiers
- NHLE: 1018385
- Atlas of Hillforts: 0425

Bury Camp is the site of an Iron Age multivallate hillfort in north-west Wiltshire, England. It occupies a triangular promontory of Colerne Down, in the north of Colerne parish, at the southern edge of the Cotswold Hills between two spurs of a river valley. The enclosed area of approximately 9.2ha is surrounded by a ditch 4m wide and up to 1m deep, and an outer rampart up to 1.5m high on the east and northwestern sides and up to 2m high on the southwestern side, across the neck of the promontory.

The contours of the land provide excellent natural defences to the north and east sides. On the southwestern side, where there are no natural defences, there is a further ditch 4m wide and 1m deep and an outer rampart up to 2m high and 3m wide. These are crossed by many causeways, which could be interpreted as an indication that the construction of the monument was never fully completed. The entrance in the middle of the southwestern side is thought to be of modern origin. At the northeastern corner, the inner bank turns inwards to form a funnel-shaped entrance leading to a hollow way running down the steep scarp into the valley below. Another entrance about a quarter of the way along the northwestern side also consists of inward-turning ramparts forming a funnel-shaped entrance.

A small enclosure within the camp is visible on aerial photographs. It is circular, 72m in diameter, with a bank and an outer ditch. The site has been a scheduled monument since 1925.

Excavations carried out under Denis Grant King, from 1959 onwards, turned over some good examples of Iron Age drystone walling, and found remains of a much earlier structure that existed at the northeast entrance, indicated by drystone revetments within the northern rampart. In the second stage, the entrance was remodelled and widened. At the northwest entrance, four staggered post holes were uncovered as well as a cylindrical cavity 0.66m deep, interpreted as a gate post hole.

The building of the hillfort can be dated to about 350 BC, but various Neolithic and Mesolithic flint tools were found, indicating a much earlier use. Flint artifacts including scrapers, cores, and flakes were found within the camp. Rotary and saddle querns were also found, along with a possible axe polishing stone. In 1960, 175 shards of pottery were recovered; all except one were plain coarse ware without a trace of decoration.

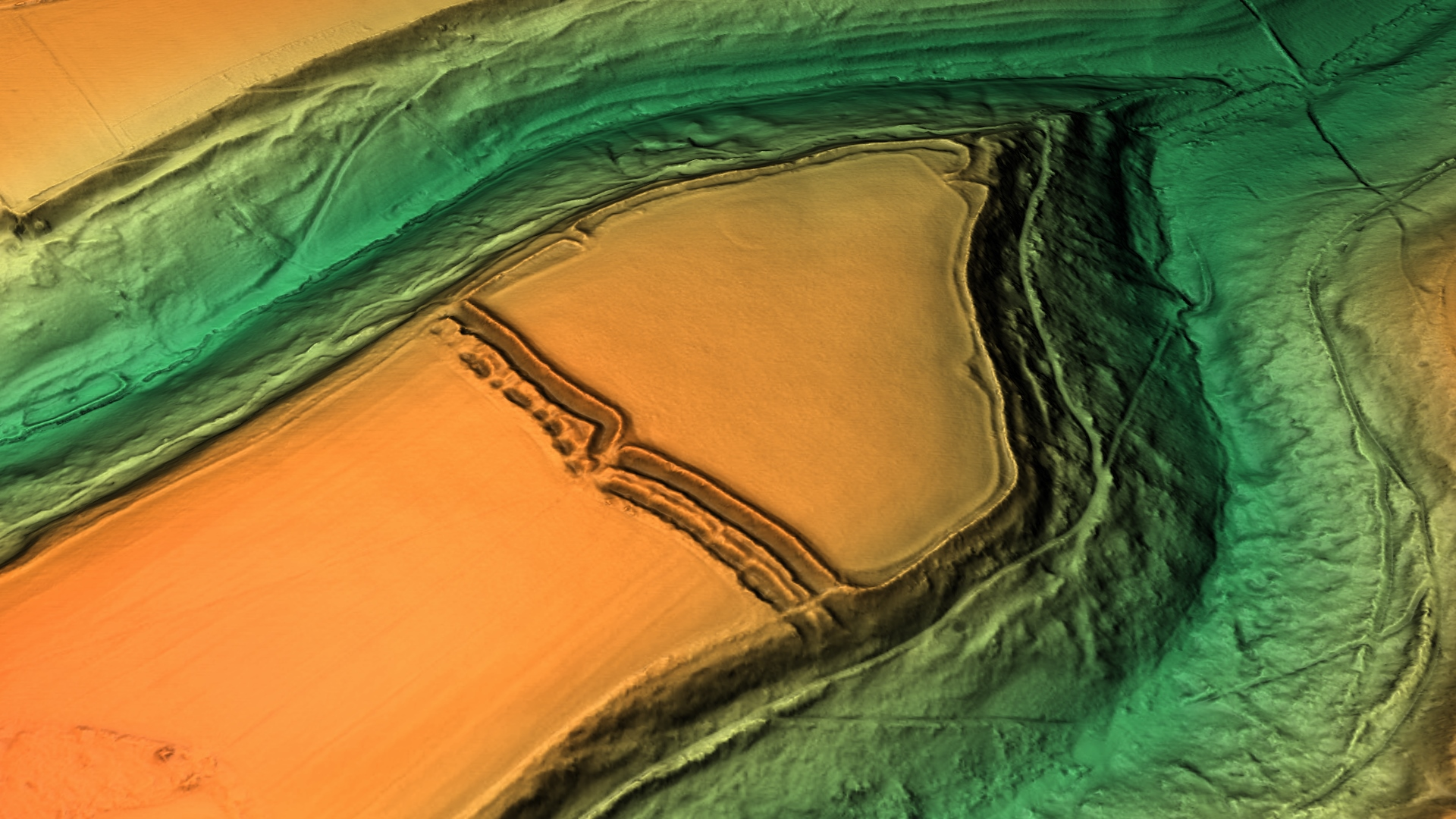
3D view of the digital terrain model

Among organic remains, only two fragments of human bones were found, whereas between 400 and 500 animal bone fragments were found. This included typical domestic animals such as sheep, goats, cattle, pigs, horses, and dogs. Six specimens were of large birds, probably swans or geese. Deer, fox, rabbit, and vole bones were also found. The relative rarity of anything but domestic animals may suggest that the camp was used for stock-keeping and that it was unlikely that hunting played a large part in the food economy of the camp.

== Location ==
The site is at grid reference ST818740, to the south of the village of North Wraxall, in the county of Wiltshire. The site has a height of 145m AOD. The Fosse Way Roman road passes close by to the west.

== See also ==
- List of hillforts in England
