= Irish food shortages (1925) =

In 1925, the newly independent Irish Free State underwent food shortages. The Irish War of Independence, the Irish Civil War and an economic depression had taken their toll on society, with over 100,000 unemployed in a population of three million.

== Official denial by the Minister for Lands and Agriculture ==
The Executive Council of the Irish Free State denied that people faced starvation. Speaking in the Dáil, the Minister for Lands and Agriculture Patrick Hogan, stated, "There is no abnormal distress in the West this year. I say that definitely and deliberately. There is always distress in the West, but the distress this year is not... particularly unique,... There is never real famine in the West unless there is a failure of potatoes, and there was no failure of potatoes this year."

Hogan's claim was not only at odds with media reports over the previous six months but also with his own colleagues. Heavy rain had caused crop failure and destroyed animal fodder, and the flooding of peat bogs had also deprived people of fuel. The government were accused of covering up the food shortages in order to avoid bad publicity. The Department of Local Government and Public Health insisted in February that there was no famine, merely "acute distress."

== Loss of livestock ==
In April 1925, an Irish Times report described the loss of livestock from fluke and other diseases in County Clare, but it disputed reports that people had been living on leaves or making stock out of the meat of animals which had died of disease. Conditions returned to normal with better harvests in 1925 and 1926.

== Relief efforts ==
The Free State government allocated IR£250,000 in relief funds. An appeal for funds was made in Australia by Linda Kearns in February 1925, raising thousands of Australian pounds. The Workers International Relief (a Communist International adjunct) also organised relief. The Catholics of New York sent US$25,000 in February 1925. In relation to the donation, Archbishop Patrick O'Donnell described conditions as "No famine, but much want in places." An English firm offered to send one ton of chocolate to the children of Connacht but cancelled its plans when the Irish government insisted on payment of duty on the donation.
