= Glenveagh Castle =

Mansion in County Donegal, Ireland

Coordinates: 55°02′N 7°58′W

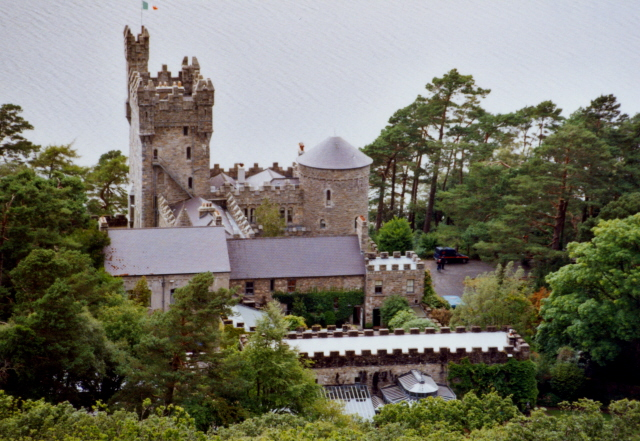
Glenveagh Castle

Glenveagh Castle (Irish: Caisleán Ghleann Bheatha) is a large castellated mansion located in Glenveagh National Park, County Donegal, Ireland and was built in about 1870.

== History ==
Captain John George Adair built Glenveagh Castle between 1867 and 1873. It stands within the boundaries of Glenveagh National Park, near both Churchill and Gweedore in County Donegal, Ireland. It is built in the Scottish baronial architectural style and consists of a four-story rectangular keep, surrounded by a garden, and a backdrop of some 165.4 km^{2} (40,873 acres) of mountains, lakes, glens and woods complete with a herd of red deer. The Irish Gleann Bheatha (Bheithe) translates into English as "Glen of the Birch Trees". The visitor centre has displays that explain the park as well as an audio-visual show and is accessible for patrons with disabilities.

=== Captain Adair ===
The castle was built by Captain John George Adair (1823-1885), a native of County Laois, and a member of the minor gentry. Adair had made his fortune by chancy land speculation in the United States, and he returned to Ireland and bought up vast tracts of land in Donegal. Adair had married in 1869, Cornelia Wadsworth Ritchie, a daughter of James S. Wadsworth, a Union general in the American Civil War. Together they set about the creation of the gardens and castle. Adair's ambition was to create an estate and castle that surpassed Balmoral, Queen Victoria's Scottish retreat. John Adair is remembered with scant affection in Donegal. On the heels of the Great Famine and emigration on a par with the Highland Clearances, John Adair evicted 224 tenants from their blackhouses on his land. This was not for financial gain, but merely to improve the aesthetic aspect from the castle. These tenant clearances are known as the "Derryveagh Evictions". The name of John George Adair as a Donegal landlord has passed into history and folklore, ballad and documentary. All have one thing in common – Adair was notoriously cruel. He purchased Glenveagh and Gartan in 1859 making an estate of 28,000 acres (110 km^{2}).

His troubles with the tenants began almost immediately. A row between them and Adair over shooting rights and trespassing sheep culminated in the murder of his Scottish steward James Murrog. Consequently, Adair carried out his threat to evict the tenancy. On 3 April 1861, a considerable cortege of 200 police, three sub-officers, the resident magistrate and the sub-sheriff set out from Letterkenny to undertake their duties. The evictions began at Lough Barra, where a widow, Mrs Hanna McAward and her six daughters and one son were the first to suffer. The work of destruction continued for three days through Magerashangan, Staghall, Claggan, Ardator and Castletown among other townlands. In all, 44 families were evicted making a total of 244 persons.

It is said that a curse was placed on the castle due to the cruel evictions so that none of the subsequent owners had heirs to the family names.

Many of the evicted went to the work house in Letterkenny, others were helped by locals and the clergy also raised money. In Australia, the Donegal Relief Fund was revitalized and arrangements were made to help young people aged between 16 and 28 years to emigrate. Many took advantage of the scheme. As they settled in Sydney the strong oral tradition ensured that the descendants remembered their families' bitter memories.

His widow Cornelia Adair (1837–1921) took over the ownership after John Adair's death in 1885. She lived part of the time at Glenveagh Castle, and, unlike Adair, was popular, improved the beauty of the castle grounds and was considerate of the townspeople. They left no children.

The Duke of Connaught and his wife the Duchess were guests of Mrs. Adair in September 1902.

Internationally renowned Harvard University Professor Arthur Kingsley Porter purchased Glenveagh Castle and the surrounding property from the Adair estate in 1929. Porter and his wife Lucy used it as a second home, displayed his significant art collection, and entertained guests. Porter also built a fishing cottage on Inishbofin Island. He disappeared mysteriously from that area on 8 July 1933. Porter's widow, Lucy, sold the castle and properties to Henry Plumer McIlhenny of Philadelphia. McIlhenny was a friend and former student of Porter's at Harvard University.

=== Henry Plumer McIlhenny ===
Henry Plumer McIlhenny of Philadelphia purchased the estate in 1938, having rented it during the summer months since 1933. McIlhenny left the gardens and castle to the Irish nation in the 1970s, so that Glenveagh National Park could be created, but continued to use the castle as a part-time residence until 1982.

== Gallery ==
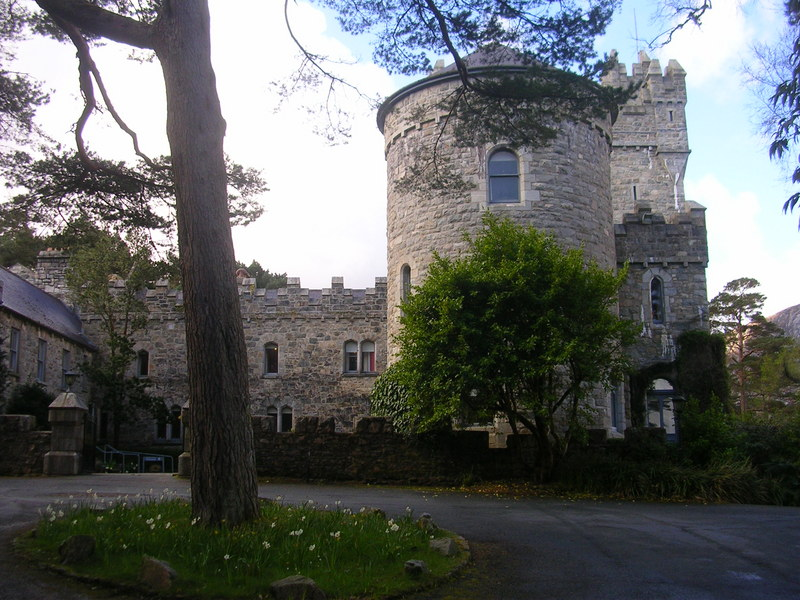
Glenveagh Castle (2015)

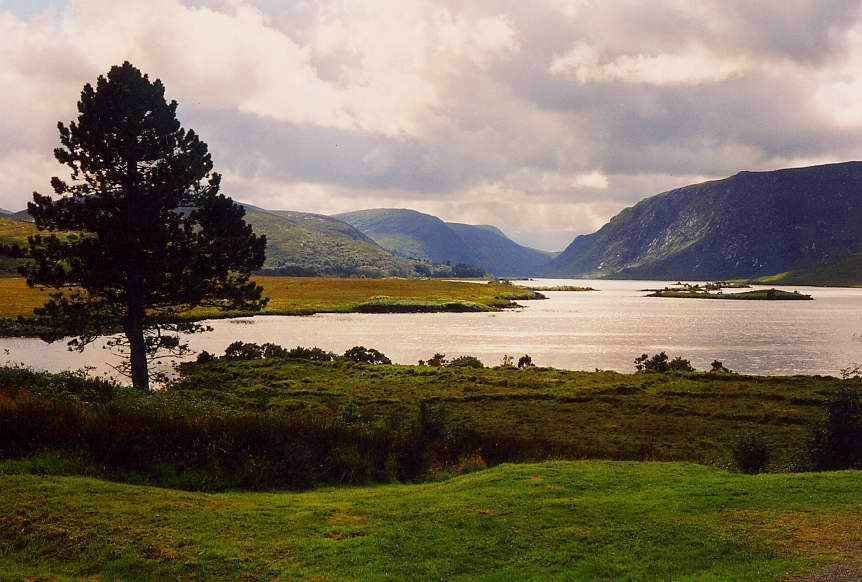
Glenveagh National Park

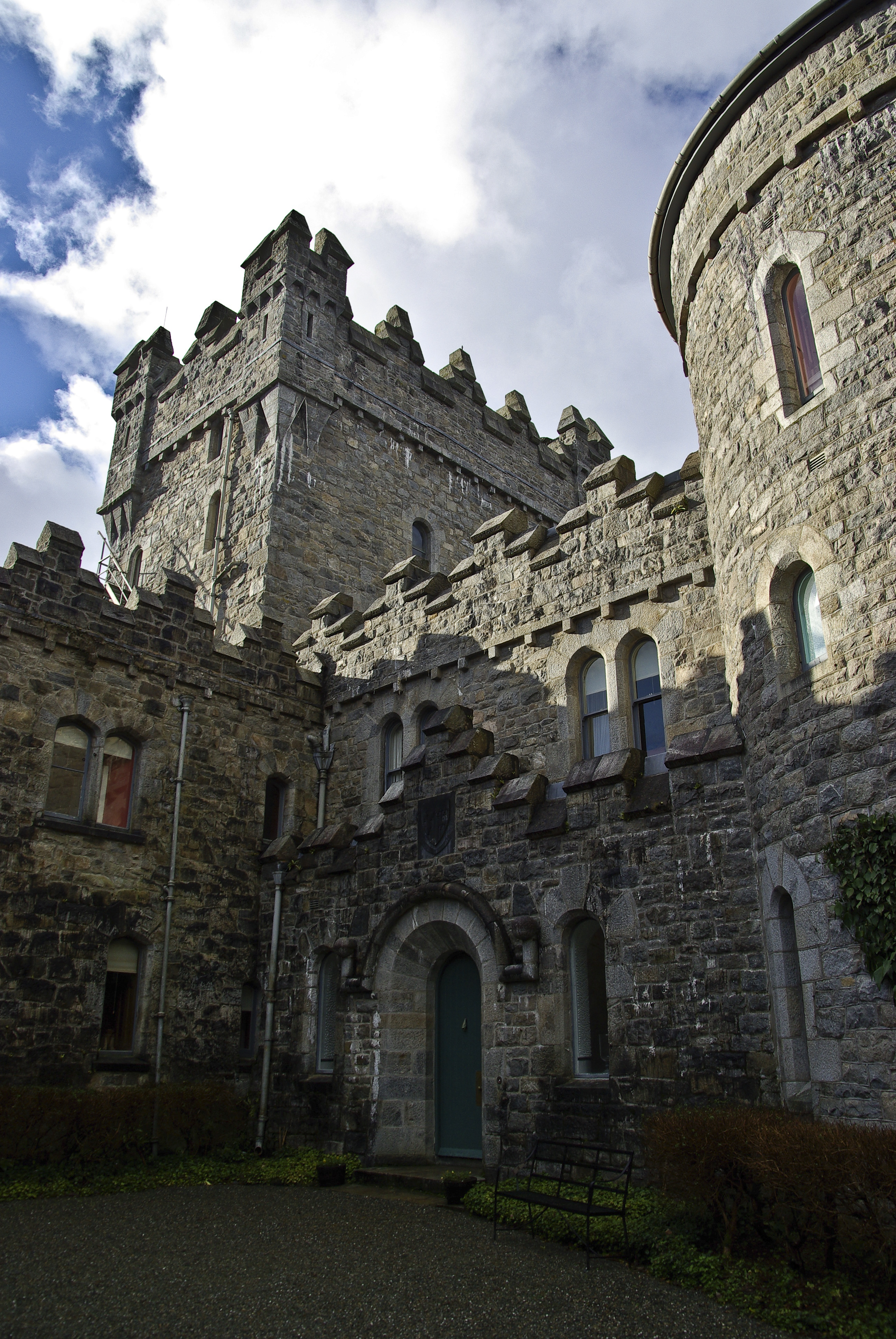
Glenveagh

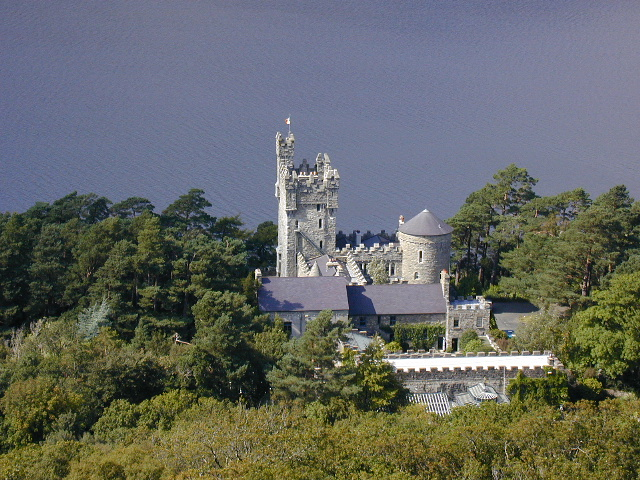
Glenveagh Castle

== See also ==
- List of tourist attractions in Ireland
