= Isobel Smith =

Archaeologist (1912–2005)

Isobel Foster Smith (22 December 1912 – 18 November 2005) was a Canadian-born British archaeologist who is best known for her work at Avebury and its surroundings.

== Early life and education ==
Smith spent her early life in Ontario, studying for a BA in English and French at the University of Toronto in 1935, followed by scholarships at the University of Grenoble and the Sorbonne. After World War II, she moved to London where she enrolled for a part-time diploma at the Institute of Archaeology. She subsequently studied for a PhD on English Neolithic ceramics under the supervision of Gordon Childe.

== Career ==
In 1956, Smith was approached by Gabrielle Keiller, the widow of archaeologist Alexander Keiller who had died the previous year leaving 15 years of intensive excavation at Avebury unanalysed and unpublished. She asked Smith to write up his excavations from the 1920s and 1930s, a huge task that was eventually completed with the publication in 1965 of Windmill Hill and Avebury. She also undertook excavations at several sites in the area, including Windmill Hill.

Smith took a permanent position at the Royal Commission on the Historical Monuments of England, where she remained as Senior Investigator until her retirement in 1978.

== Personal life ==
Smith moved to Avebury for the start of her work in 1956, and continued to live there for the rest of her life. She died on 18 November 2005 at the age of 92.

== Bibliography ==
- Ashbee, P., and Smith, I. F., 1960. 'The Windmill Hill long barrow', Antiquity 34, 297–9
- Ashbee, P., and Smith, I. F., 1966. 'The date of the Windmill Hill long barrow', Antiquity 40, 299
- Cleal, R. 2004. Monuments and Material Culture. Papers in honour of an Avebury Archaeologist: Isobel Smith. Oxford: Oxbow Books.
- [Isobel Smith]: Windmill Hill and Avebury. Excavations by Alexander Keiller, 1925–1939. Oxford: Clarendon Press, 1965. 265 pp., 41 pls., 7 tables, 83 figs. 105s.
- Smith, I. F.; Simpson, D. D. A. (1964). "Excavation of three Roman tombs and a prehistoric pit on Overton Down". Wiltshire Archaeological and Natural History Magazine. 59: 68–85 – via Biodiversity Heritage Library.
- Smith, I. F., and Evans, J. G., 1968. 'Excavation of two long barrows in North Wiltshire', Antiquity 42, 138–42.
