= Irish Famine (1861) =

Irish Famine 1861 refers to the famine that occurred in 1861, Ireland. The Western part was hit hardest.

In 1861, there were reports of famine in Ireland.

Three-fourths of the potato crop were destroyed, and the people of western Ireland were worse off than in 1847.

It has been reported that England declined extraordinary relief.

== See also ==
- Irish famine (disambiguation)
