= Alexander Keiller (archaeologist) =

Scottish archaeologist (1889–1955)

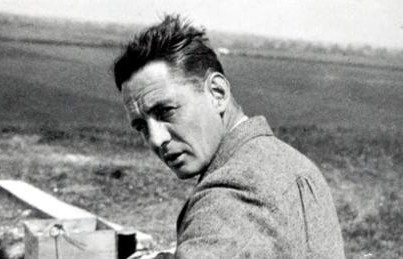
- Born: 1 December 1889
- Died: 29 October 1955 (aged 65)
- Citizenship: United Kingdom

Academic background
- Education: Hazelwood School; Eton College

Academic work
- Discipline: Archaeology
- Sub-discipline: Prehistory; Avebury; aerial photography

Alexander Keiller FSA, FGS (1 December 1889 – 29 October 1955) was a Scottish archaeologist, pioneering aerial photographer, businessman and philanthropist. He worked on an extensive prehistoric site at Avebury in Wiltshire, England, and helped ensure its preservation.

Keiller was heir to the marmalade business of his family, James Keiller & Son, that had been established in 1797 in Dundee, and exported marmalade and confectionery across the British Empire. He used his wealth to acquire a total of 950 acres (3.8 km^{2}) of land in Avebury for preservation, where he conducted excavations and re-erected some standing stones. He also pioneered aerial photography for archaeological interpretation.

At Avebury, Keiller founded the Morven Institute of Archeological Research, now the Alexander Keiller Museum. In 1943 he sold the land at Avebury to the National Trust for its agricultural value only.

His fourth wife, Gabrielle Keiller, was also an archaeological photographer, whom he met in connection with Avebury.

== Early life and education ==
Alexander Keiller was born at Binrock House in Dundee on 1 December 1889, the only child of businessman John Mitchell Keiller (1851–1899) and Mary Sime Greig (1862–1907), of the Dundee medical family.

When Keiller was nine, his father died, leaving him the sole heir to the wealth generated by the family's business. He was sent to Hazelwood School at Limpsfield in Surrey and from there went on to Eton College. When he was seventeen, his mother died, and he returned home to administer the family business.

== Family life and death ==
On 2 June 1913, Keiller married Florence Marianne Phil-Morris (1883–1955), the daughter of artist Philip Richard Morris. They moved into Keiller's house in London. After the First World War, they were divorced.

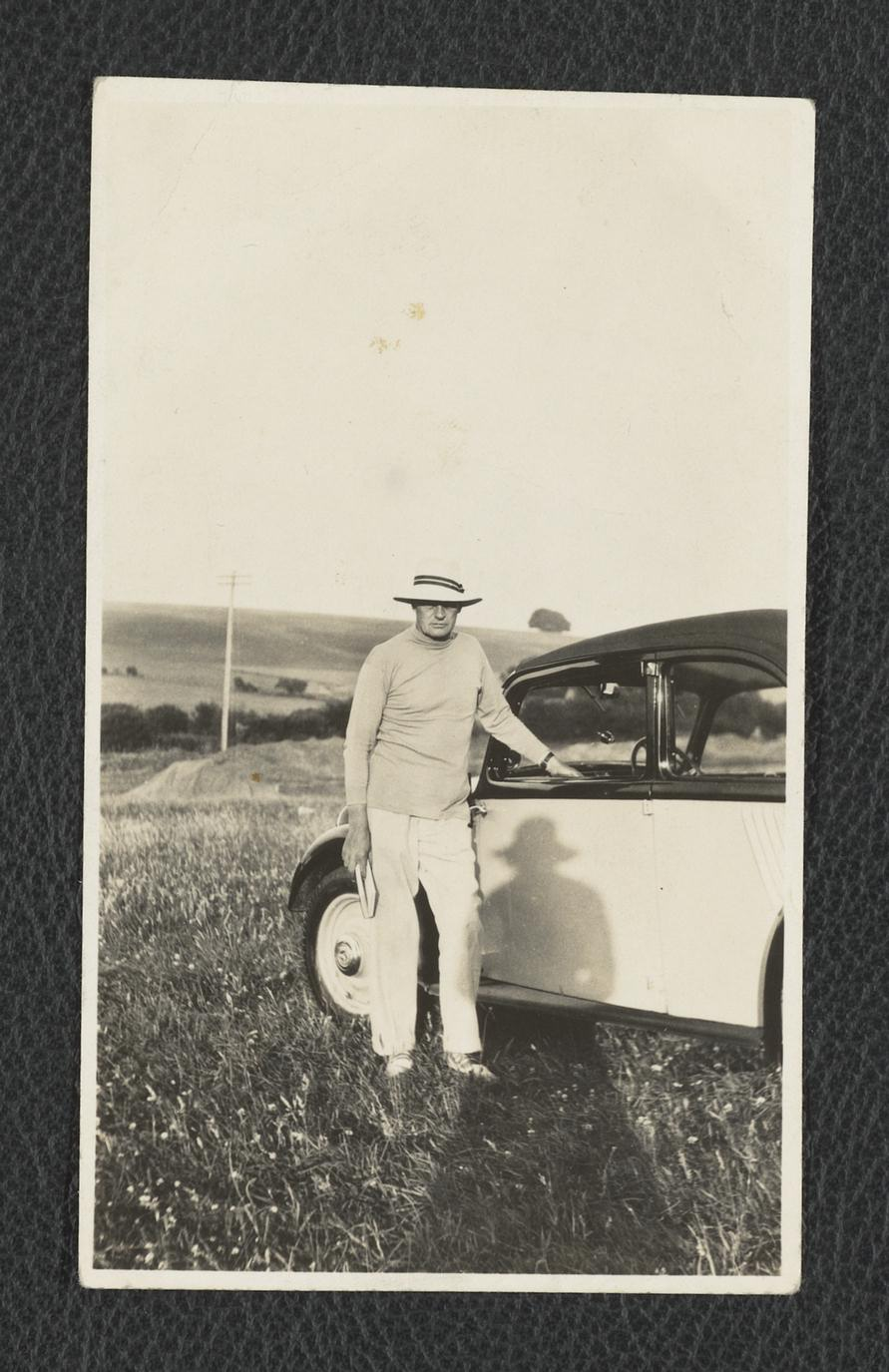
Alexander Keiller, date unknown

On 29 February 1924, Keiller married Veronica Mildred Liddell (1900–1964). Veronica shared his interest in archaeology and visited Avebury with him later that year. She was one of the supervisors for the 1925–1929 Windmill Hill excavations, near Avebury, alongside her sister Dorothy Liddell. Following a separation, Keiller divorced Veronica in 1934.

On 16 November 1938, Keiller married for a third time; his new wife was Doris Emerson Chapman (b. 1901), an artist. She had joined the Morven Institute of Archaeological Research, founded by Keiller, in 1937. Her contributions in this field include detailed illustrations of the stones as part of the West Kennet Avenue excavations and the creation of visual reconstructions of faces from skulls, four of which were from a burial mound at Chippenham. Keiller and Chapman divorced in 1951.

He later married a fourth time, to Gabrielle Style (1908–1995). She lived past his death in 1955, and in 1966 she donated the museum and its contents to the nation.

Keiller died in October 1955, although Piggott's obituary for him wrongly stated September.

== Career ==
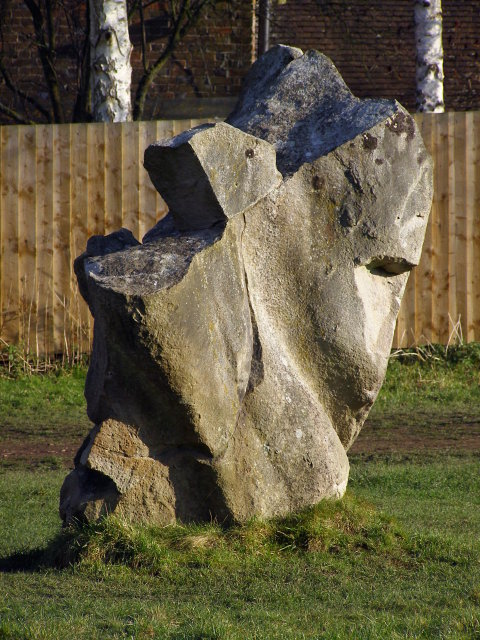
The Forge Stone at Avebury Stone Circle

In 1913, Keiller funded the establishment of Sizaire-Berwick, an Anglo-French manufacturer of luxury cars.

After the outbreak of the First World War, he joined the Royal Naval Volunteer Reserve as a temporary lieutenant, moving to the Royal Naval Air Service in December 1914. In 1915 he was invalided out of the service, but in 1918 he joined air intelligence, where he remained until the end of the war.

Keiller began to pursue an interest in archaeology. In 1922 he and O. G. S. Crawford undertook an aerial survey of archaeological sites in south western England. This led to their publication of Wessex from the Air in 1928, which Lynda Murray notes was "the first book of aerial archaeology to be published in the UK".

Using his wealth, Keiller decided to buy nearby Windmill Hill and then undertake excavations there. Excavations began with the co-directorship of Harold St George Gray, and with William Young suggested by Gray as foreman. Keiller's work proved that the site was a causewayed enclosure, and it became the monument type-site for decades afterward. He succeeded in getting Tomnaverie stone circle in Aberdeenshire into state guardianship. In 1934, he began a two-year excavation of the West Kennet Avenue, which leads south east from the Avebury stone circle. As he discovered buried stones, he had them re-erected, and marked the vacant stone-holes with pillars.

Stuart Piggott, who was part of Keiller's 'staff' during excavations at West Kennet Avenue and Avebury, notes that Keiller "adopted a policy of imaginative but judicious conservation and restoration of the Avebury monuments, and systematically purchased land to preserve these and their surroundings".

Keiller's first major excavation at Avebury was in 1937, the first of three seasons over the ensuing years. Each concentrated on a quadrant of the circle, clearing undergrowth, restoring and conserving the site. Buried stones, some up to a metre below ground, were uncovered and replaced in their original stone-holes. As with the avenue, he placed concrete pylons to denote missing stones. In 1937, he founded the Morven Institute of Archaeological Research as a business entity to manage the accounts of the work, and to publish reports.

In 1938, Denis Grant King arrived at Avebury and persuaded Keiller to employ him at first on a temporary, then permanent basis. Keiller's team discovered the famous barber surgeon of Avebury skeleton in the south west quadrant. Keiller opened his museum that year, to display finds from the Windmill Hill, West Kennet, and Avebury excavations.

Keiller leased and restored Avebury Manor & Garden, now a National Trust property consisting of an early 16th-century manor house and its surrounding garden.

The Second World War ended excavations at Avebury. Keiller joined the special constabulary at Marlborough and as his duties left little time for archaeology, he had the museum mothballed.

== Legacy ==
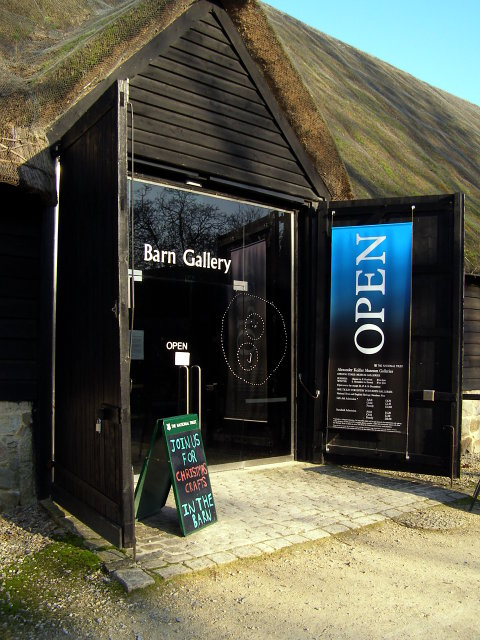
The Barn Gallery of the Alexander Keiller Museum

In 1943, Keiller sold his holdings in Avebury to the National Trust for £12,000, simply the agricultural value of the 950 acres (3.8 km^{2}) he had accrued, and not reflecting the investment he had made at the site. His excavations at Avebury were unpublished at his death, but his widow, Gabrielle Keiller commissioned archaeologist Isobel Smith to publish the records, which she completed in 1965. In 1966 Gabrielle donated the Avebury museum and its contents to the nation.

In 1986, UNESCO designated Avebury (together with Stonehenge and associated sites) as a World Heritage Site. In 2000, it received over 350,000 visitors.
