= John George Adair =

Businessman and landowner

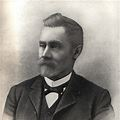
John George Adair

John George Adair (3 March 1823– 4 May, 1885), sometimes known as Jack Adair, born in County Laois, Ireland, was a Scots-Irish businessman and landowner, financier of JA Ranch in the Texas Panhandle.

Adair had made his fortune in Ireland buying up estates bankrupt after the Irish potato great famine.

In 1866 Adair made his first visit to the United States and established a brokerage firm in New York City for the purpose of placing British loans in America at higher interest rates than those in Britain.

Together with his business partner Charles Goodnight, Adair established the JA Ranch, the first cattle ranch in the Texas panhandle in 1877 in the Palo Duro Canyon area.

In 1867, at a ball given in honor of Congressman J. C. Hughes, Adair met Mrs. Cornelia Wadsworth Ritchie, whom he married in 1869.

He is buried at Rathdaire Protestant Parish Church, Ballybrittas.

== Black Jack Adair ==
Adair is infamous for the evictions of forty-seven families in Derryveagh, County Donegal, Ireland, "during famine ." The evictions which began in April 1861, had resulted that overnight, 244 men, women and children were evicted from their homes and left to wander the roads seeking shelter. They were known as the "Derryveagh Evictions". It cleared 11,600 acres of mountainous land in proximity to what is now Glenveagh National Park. It earned him the title "Black Jack Adair".

It has been said that "more than 150 screaming children and their parents were ordered off the property." Some claim, the evictions were part of Adair's efforts to beautify the land about the castle and improve its view.

It has motivated the Donegal poet William Allingham to write the poem The Eviction.
