= JA Ranch =

- J A Ranch
- U.S. National Register of Historic Places
- U.S. National Historic Landmark
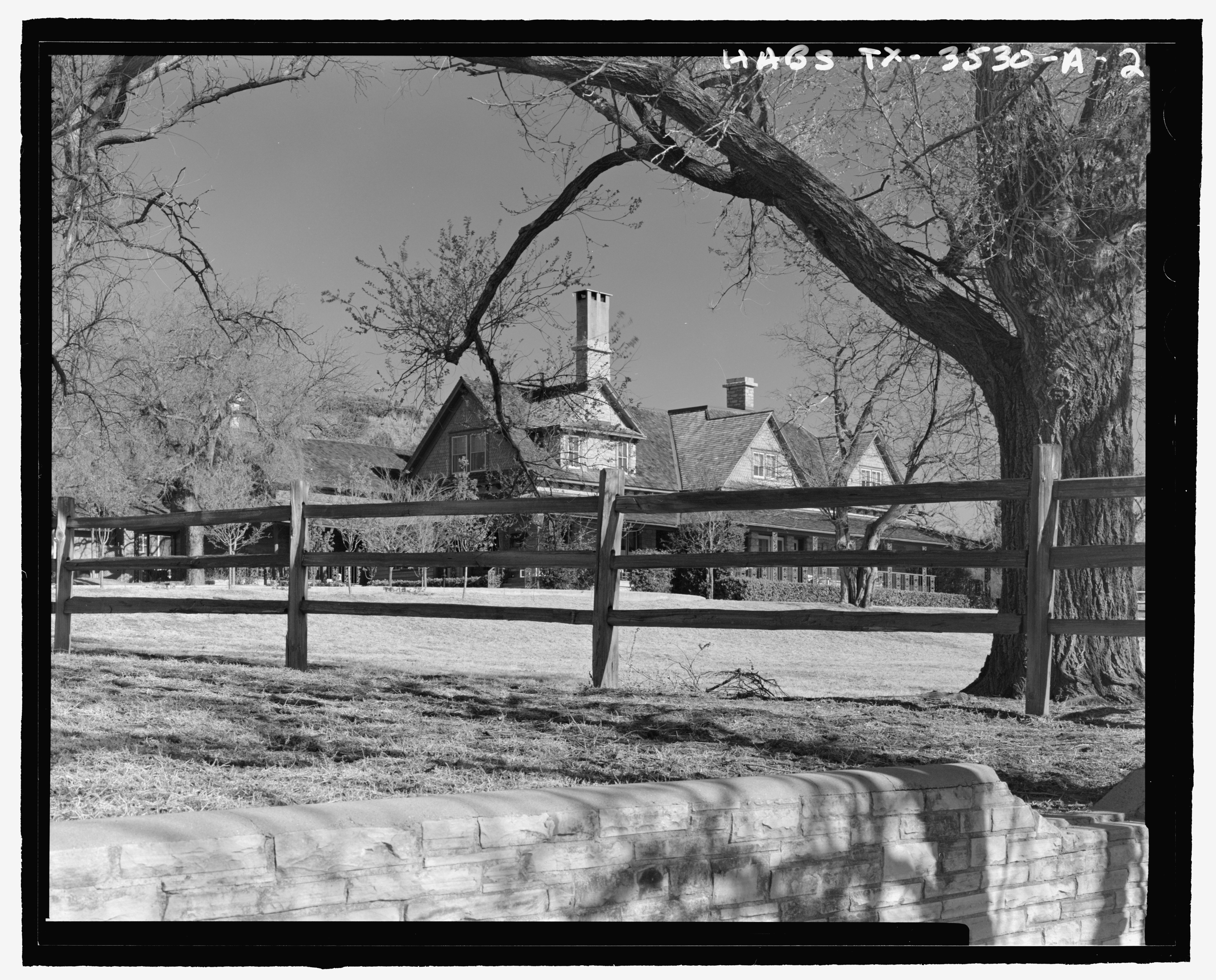
- HABS photo, 2000

- Location within Texas Location within the United States
- Nearest city: Claude, Texas
- Coordinates: 34°49′0″N 101°11′17″W
- Area: 40 acres (16 ha)
- Built: 1879
- NRHP reference No.: 66000807

Significant dates
- Added to NRHP: October 15, 1966
- Designated NHL: December 19, 1960

The JA Ranch is a historic cattle ranch in the Palo Duro Canyon in Armstrong County, Texas. Founded in 1876 by Charles Goodnight and John George Adair, it is the oldest cattle ranching operation in the Texas Panhandle. Its headquarters area was designated a National Historic Landmark in 1960 for its association with Goodnight, one of the most influential cattle barons of the late 19th century. The ranch is an ongoing business, operated by Adair's descendants.

== Description and history ==
The JA Ranch is located southeast of Amarillo, Texas in the Texas Panhandle. The main ranch house is located off the caprock after miles of dirt road. It is a two-story construction, its oldest portion a log cabin which was built in the 1870's. The main portion of the house, built beginning in 1879, has rough stone walls on the ground floor and a wood-framed second story. Nearby outbuildings include the original 19th-century stables and corral, and a house for bunking ranch hands.

Charles Goodnight (1836–1929) was a native of Illinois who became a Texas Ranger in 1857. After the American Civil War, he became involved in cattle herding operations that recovered many thousands of heads of cattle left unsupervised during the conflict, blazing major herding trails across West Texas. After starting a ranching operation in eastern Colorado, he returned to the Palo Duro Canyon area (site of a major operation he led against the Kiowa and Comanche) and established a small ranch in 1874. He then entered into a partnership with John Adair, a wealthy landowner from Co. Laois in Ireland, who funded the ranch's expansion while Goodnight managed it. Under their oversight the ranch grew to over one million acres. Upon John Adair's death in 1885, his wife, Cornelia (Wadsworth) Ritchie Adair, assumed the partnership with Goodnight. Goodnight retired to a smaller ranch nearby in 1889. Cornelia Adair supervised the ranch operations until her death in 1921 after which her descendants maintained the ranch into the 21st century.

== See also ==
- National Register of Historic Places listings in Armstrong County, Texas
- List of National Historic Landmarks in Texas
