= Keiller's marmalade =

Scottish marmalade

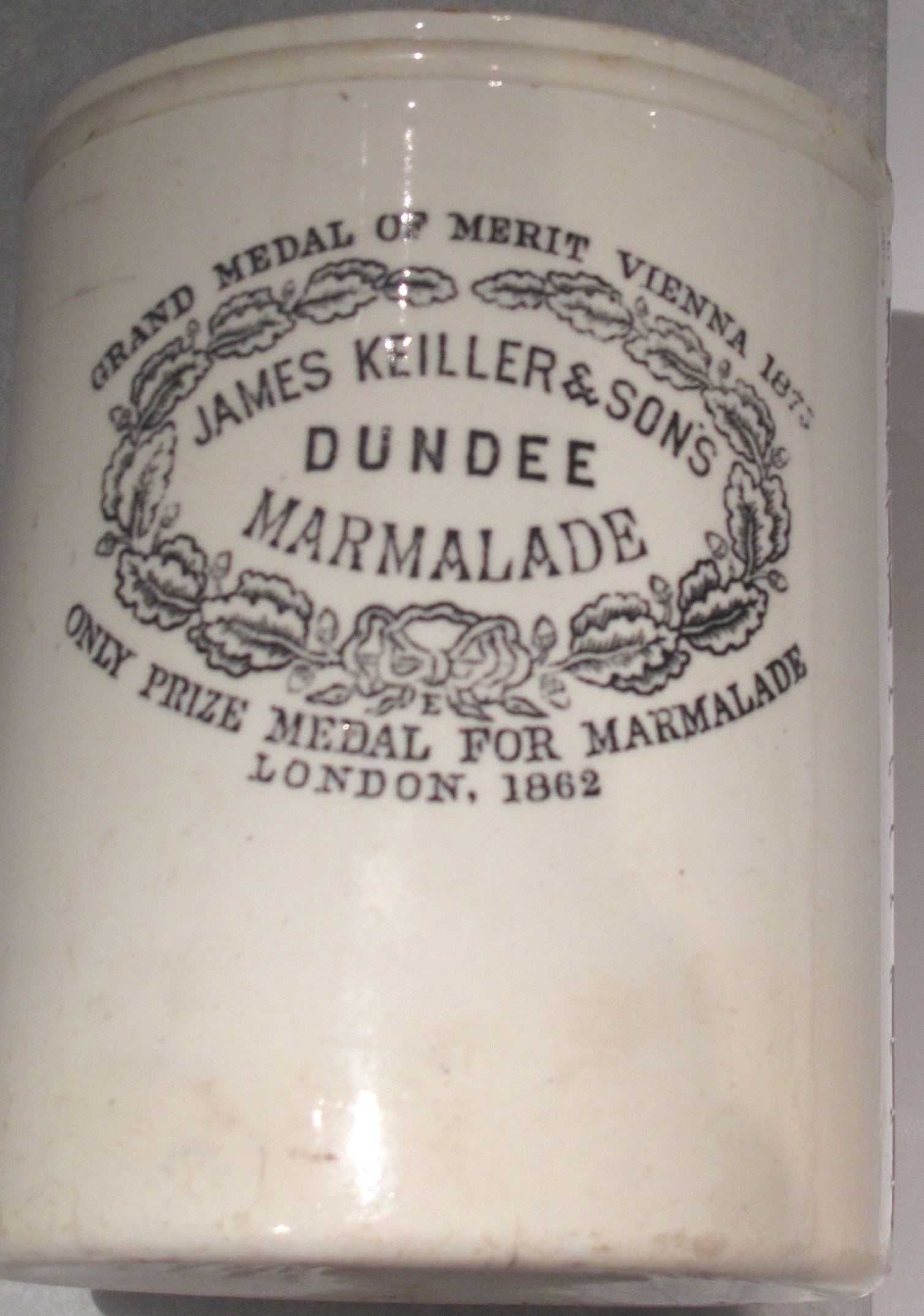
- Type: Marmalade
- Place of origin: Scotland
- Region or state: Dundee
- Created by: Janet Keiller
- Main ingredients: Oranges

Keiller's marmalade is a Scottish marmalade, believed to have been the first commercial brand made in Great Britain. It was first manufactured by James Keiller in Dundee, Scotland, later creating James Keiller & Son, a brand name which became iconic in the 18th and 19th centuries, and has been sold several times.

== History ==
According to a legend, in the 18th century, James Keiller on speculation bought a Spanish ship's cargo that included Seville oranges when the ship sought refuge from a raging storm. The ship had started its journey in Seville but the delay caused by the storm had made the oranges less fresh than they ought to have been. The bargain gave his mother, Janet, the opportunity to manufacture a large quantity of marmalade by boiling the bitter oranges with sugar.

The true story is that Marmalade had existed in Spain and Portugal since at least the 15th century and a Scottish recipe for orange marmalade appears in "Mrs McLintoch's Receipts (sic)" of 1736.

In the 1760s, Keiller ran a small confectionery shop producing jams in Seagate, Dundee. Janet Keiller's main modification to the recipe in 1797 may have been the addition of thin strips of orange rind, creating peel or "chip" marmalade. The peel was thought to aid digestion, but the pith and much of the fiber was discarded. The consistency was also changed, from its former solid form (akin to quince jelly), to a spreadable semi-liquid form, and only at this point did it begin to be placed on toast (especially morning toast). The shipload was probably no more than some boxes, particularly of Seville oranges, which were used medicinally and in a few recipes but not really consumed fresh as a fruit. The name "marmalade" originates from the Portuguese word "marmelo" or quince, the fruit which made up the preserve with thin bits of peel. Seville orange marmalades contain peel to this day.

In 1828, the company became James Keiller and Son, when James junior joined the business The Keillers' main business remained in running a grocery, and marmalade accounted for only 5% of trade in 1833. James Keiller died in 1839 and the business was continued by his widow, Margaret, and son, Alexander Keiller (1820–1877). In 1840, they moved to a new shop on Castle Street in Dundee, and were also running a small marmalade factory off the High Street. In 1859 the company set up a factory in Guernsey in order to avoid the sugar tax charged on the mainland and with a view to eventually expanding business in the south of England. In 1888 (following the abolition of the sugar tax on the British mainland), the company opened a factory at Tay Wharf, Silvertown in London. By the late 19th century the marmalade was shipping as far afield as Australia, New Zealand, South Africa, India, and China.

Only in 1867 did marmalade become the predominant company product. This also linked to a conscious promotion programme in the British colonies. The 19th-century expansions were done under the directorship of John Mitchell Keiller (1851–1899). John took over in 1877 on the death of Alexander. In 1876, when the British Trademark Registry Act came into force, Keiller's Dundee Orange Marmalade was one of the first brands to be formally registered. It is believed that James Keiller and Son was also the first to produce Dundee cake commercially and to give it the distinctive name. By the 1920s, after the firm had been acquired by Crosse & Blackwell, the company had become a producer of a wide range of confectionery, preserves and cakes. After this acquisition in 1920, Keiller was sold again several times before becoming part of another company of Scottish origin, Robertson's. It is now produced by Hain Celestial Group for export only. Keiller's fruit pulping and canning plant at Wisbech was purchased by S. W. Smedley and Co., Ltd., of London. The 1923 purchase included about 20,000 barrels of pulp. Work had been suspended at the factory for some time, and it was stated that Messrs Keiller had spent £132,000 on the plant, which could deal with about 3,000 tons of fruit in a season.

The company ceased to exist in 1992.

== Legacy ==
One of Janet Keiller's great-great-great grandsons was Alexander Keiller, the noted archaeologist, and one of her great-great-great-great grandsons is the British television presenter Monty Don.

James and Janet Keiller are buried in the Howff Cemetery in central Dundee. The grave lies very close to the south-west corner. John Mitchell Keiller lies in the Western Cemetery, Dundee.

== Gallery ==
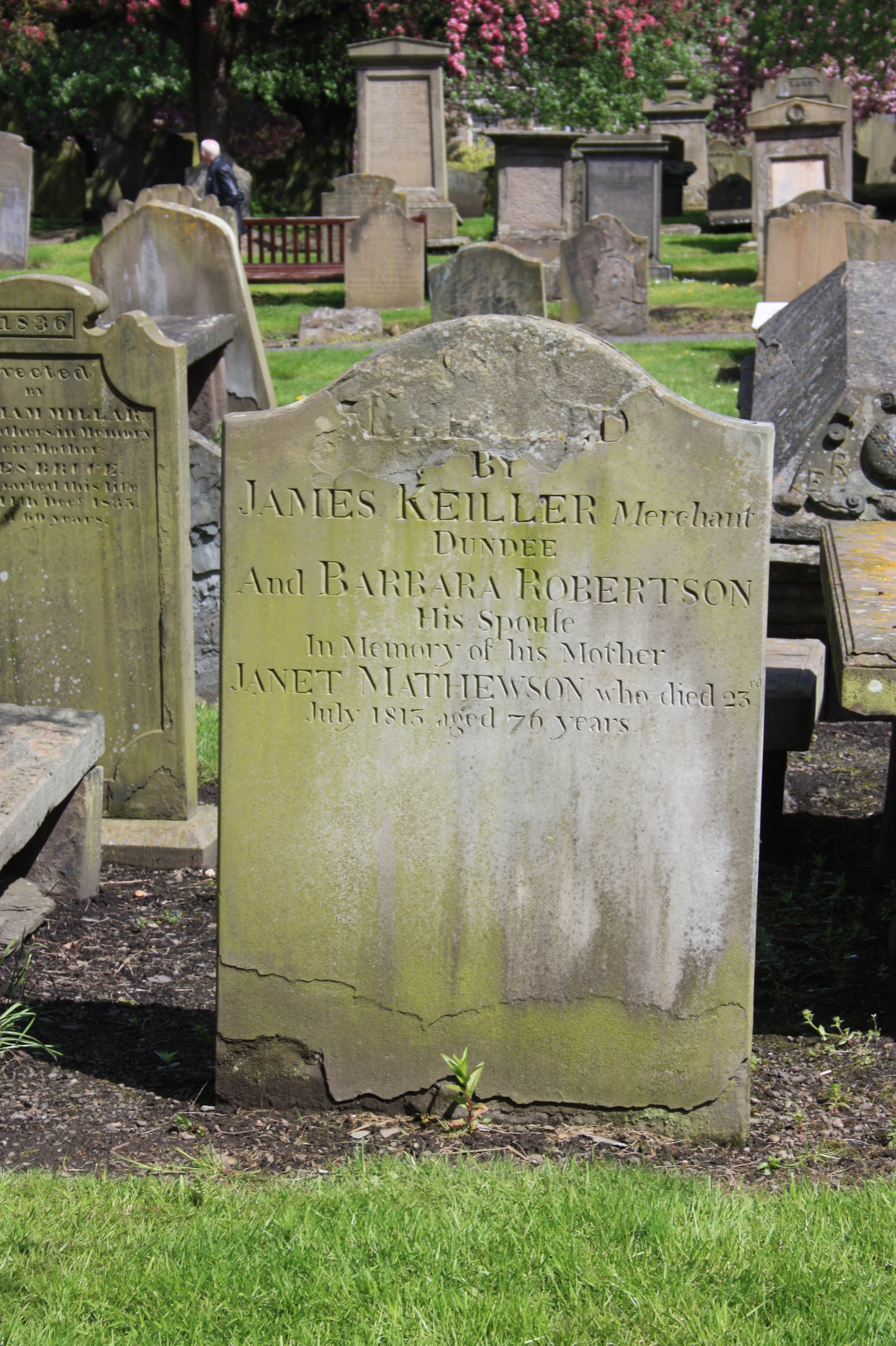
The Keiller grave, the Howff Cemetery, Dundee

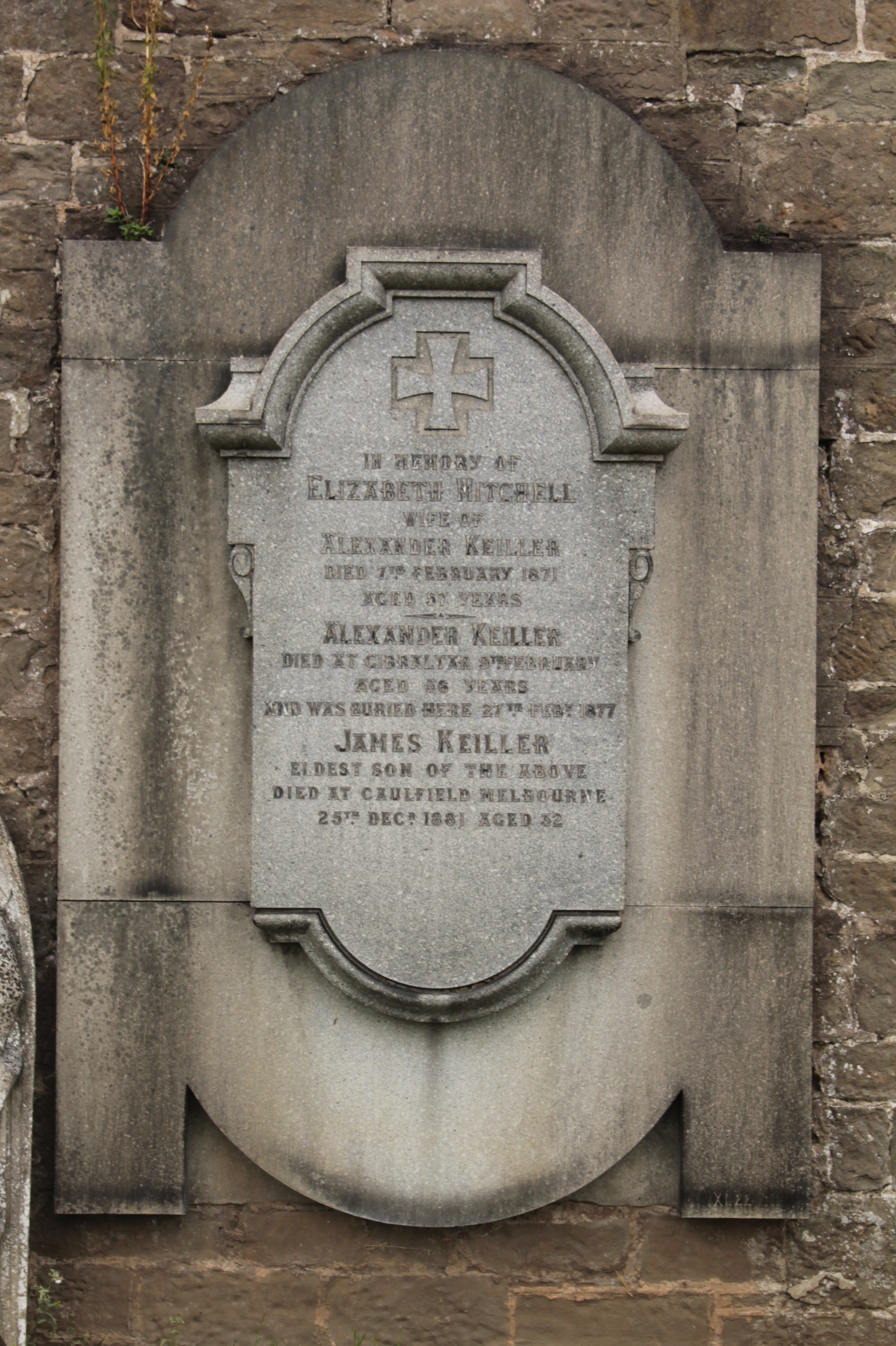
The grave of Alexander Keiller, Western Cemetery, Dundee

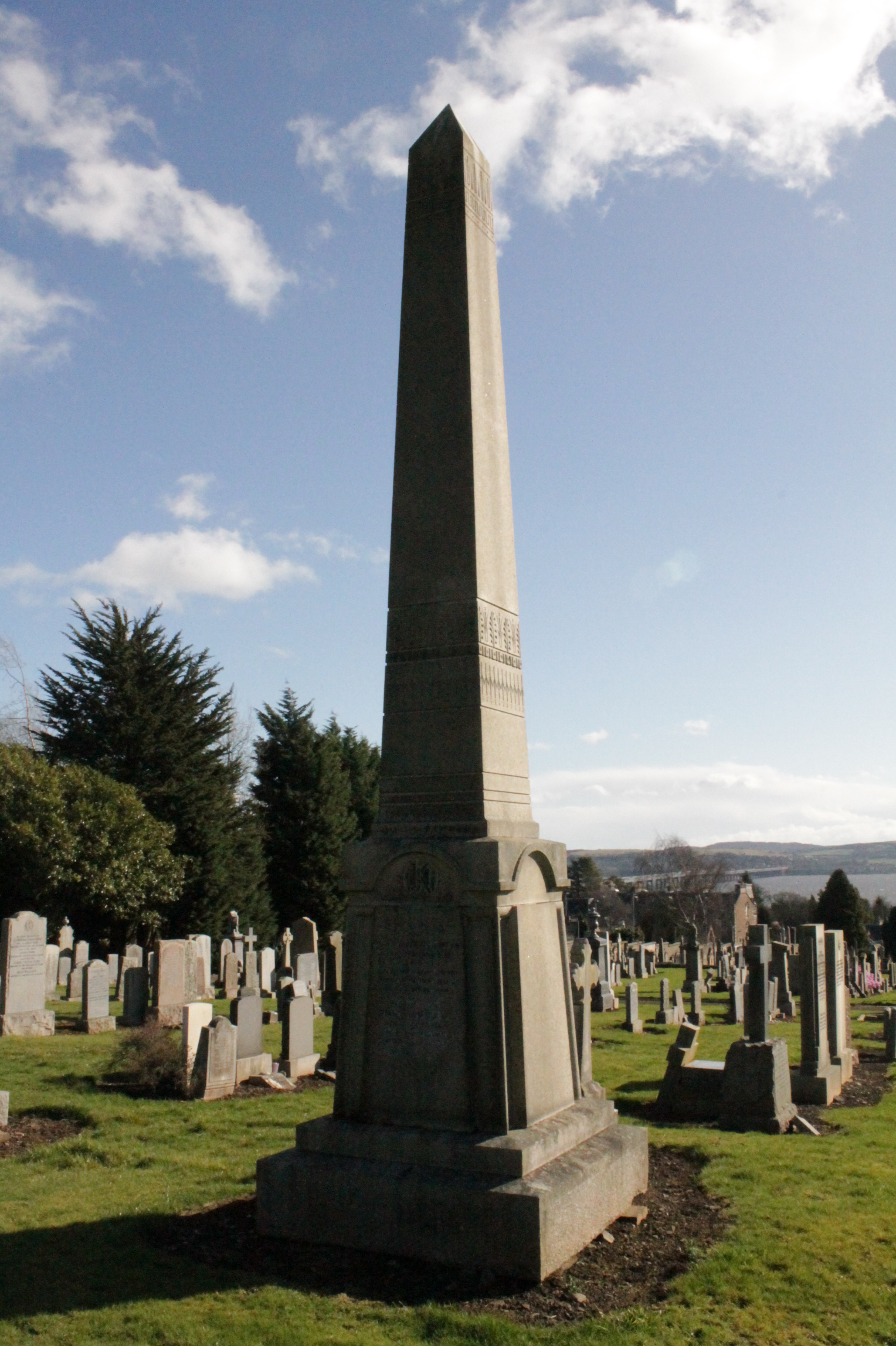
The grave of John Mitchell Keiller, Western Cemetery, Dundee
