= R246 road (Ireland) =

Road in Ireland

R246 road
- Bóthar R246
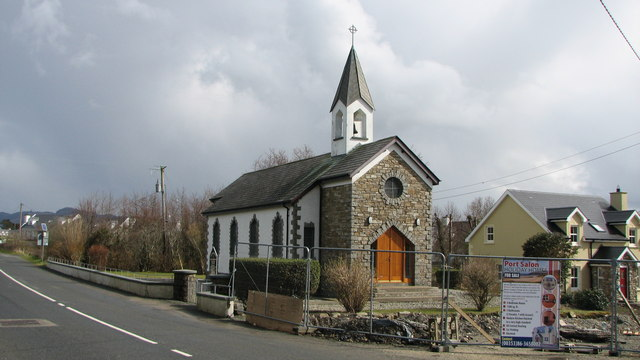
- Portsalon All Saints Church on R246

Route information
- Length: 23.1 km (14.4 mi)

Major junctions
- From: R249 at Tawney Lower, County Donegal
- R245 at Milford; R247 at Kerrykeel; R268 at Greenfort Demesne
- To: Croaghross

Location
- Country: Ireland
- Primary destinations: Milford; Kerrykeel; Portsalon

Highway system
- Roads in Ireland; Motorways; Primary; Secondary; Regional
← R245	→ R247

The R246 road is a regional road in Ireland. It is a road mostly on the Fanad peninsula in County Donegal. The northernmost section of the road at Portsalon forms part of the Wild Atlantic Way.

The R246 branches north from the R249, then passing Lough Fern on the way to Milford. From Milford the road travels along the east shore of Mulroy Bay before turning east to Lough Swilly at Portsalon. Just off the road, the beach at Ballymastocker Bay (Portsalon) has been considered one of the world's finest. The R246 is 23.1 km (14.4 mi) long.
