= Fanad =

Peninsula in County Donegal, Ireland

Fanad Head Light
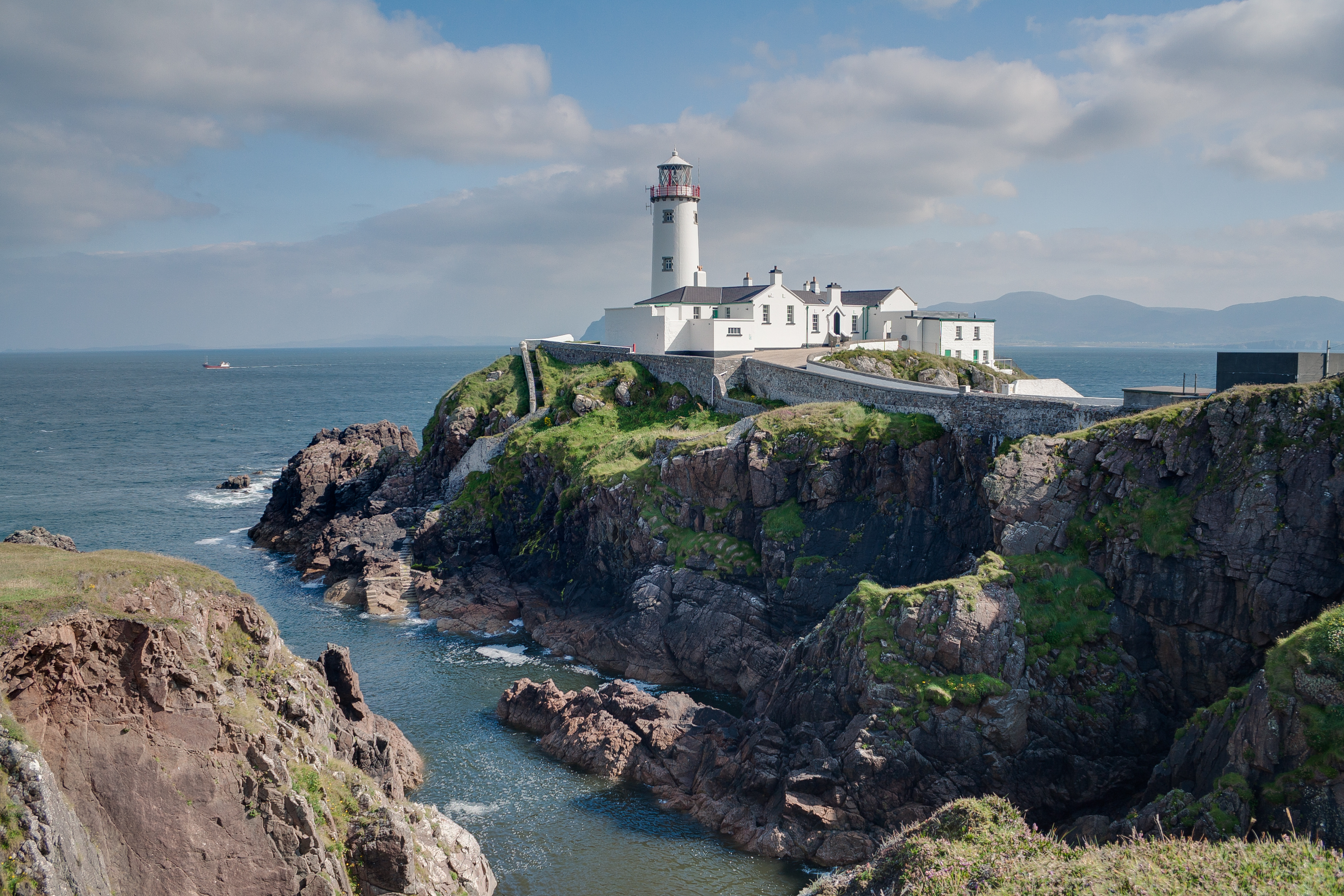
- Fanad Lighthouse County Donegal; Lough Swilly and Mulroy Bay
- Location: County Donegal, Ireland
- Coordinates: 55°16′34.6″N 7°37′54.2″W

Tower
- Constructed: 1817 (first)
- Construction: masonry tower
- Automated: 1983
- Height: 22 metres (72 ft)
- Shape: cylindrical tower with balcony and lantern
- Markings: white tower and lantern, red rail
- Operator: Fanad Head Lighthouse

Light
- First lit: 1886 (current)
- Focal height: 39 metres (128 ft)
- Lens: 300 mm
- Range: 18 nautical miles (33 km; 21 mi)
- Characteristic: Fl (5) WR 20s.
- Ireland no.: CIL-1580

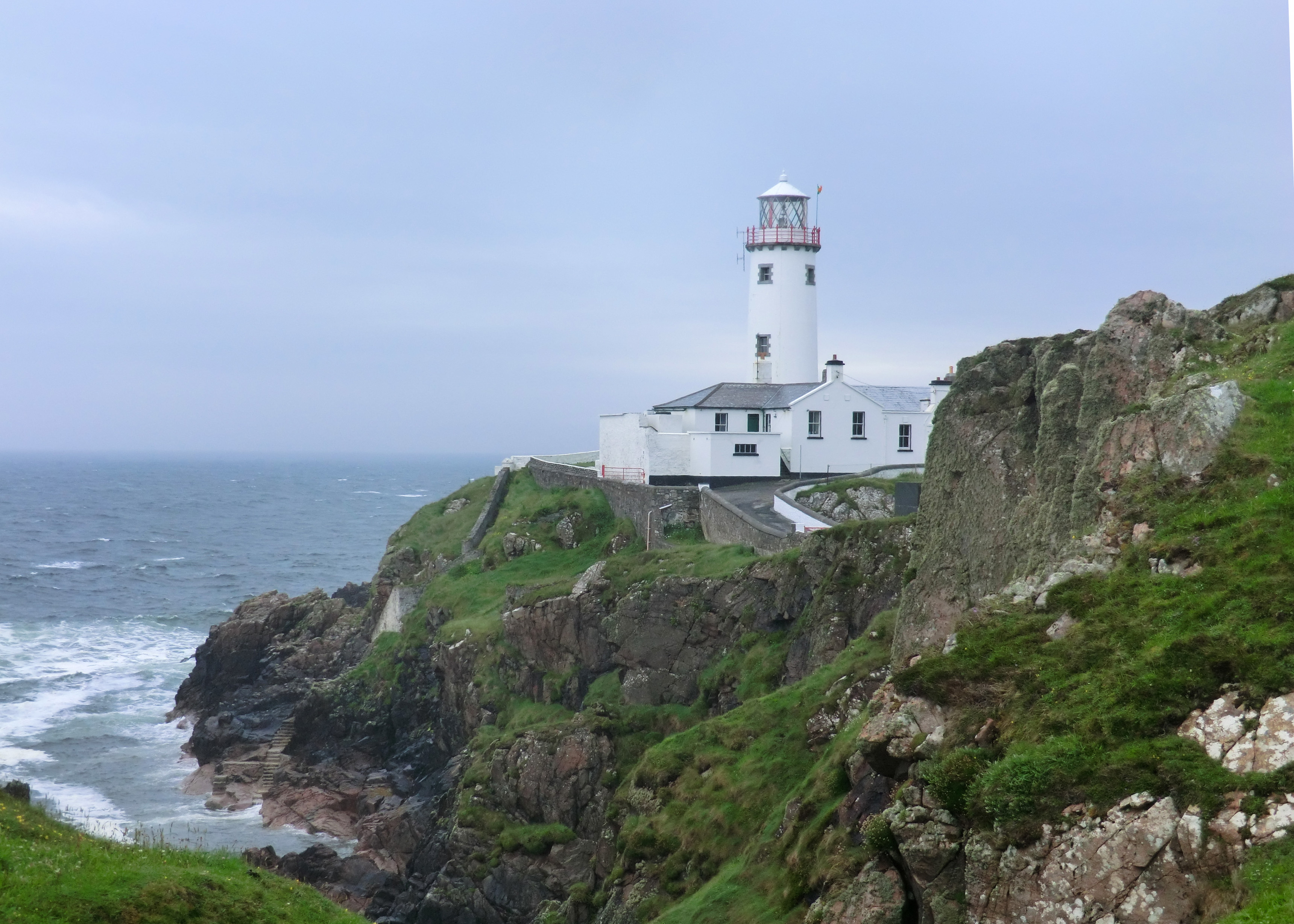
Fanad Head Lighthouse

Fanad (official name: Fánaid) is a peninsula that lies between Lough Swilly and Mulroy Bay on the north coast of County Donegal, Ireland. The origin of the name Fanad derives from the Irish language word Fána for "sloping ground". It is also referred to as Fannet or Fannett in older records. There are an estimated 700 people living in Fanad and 30% Irish speakers.

Fanad encompasses the parishes of Clondavaddog, Killygarvan and parts of Tullyfern and Aughinish. It measures approximately 25 km north–south measured from Fanad Head to the town of Ramelton and approximately 12 km east–west measured between the townlands of Doaghbeg and Glinsk. The southern boundary of Fanad has been the subject of some dispute over the centuries. In the 16th century, during the time of the MacSuibhnes as rulers of Fanad, it was stated that the territory of Fanaid stretched as far south as the River Lennon between Kilmacrennan and Ramelton. In 1835, the surveyor John O'Donovan referred to Rathmullan as the capital of Fanad, and he also refers to Clondavaddog as "the most northern parish of Fanaid", suggesting that Fanad included parishes other than Clondavaddog. O'Donovan also noted that "The inhabitants of Inishowen state that Fanaid extends from Rathmeltan to Mulroy Lough, but the natives of the Parishes of Killygarvan, Tully and Aughnish, who considered themselves civilised, deny that they themselves are of the men of Fanaid". It consists of small villages such as Tamney, Rossnakill and has a bordering village called Kerrykeel.

Family names commonly recorded in Fanad since the mid-19th century include Blake, Callaghan, Cannon/Canning, Carr/Kerr, Coll, Coyle, Deeney, Doherty, Friel, Fealty, Gallagher, Martin, McAteer/McIntyre, McConigley/McGonigle, McGinley/McKinley, Shiels/Shields and Sweeney/McSwyne.

== Geology and geography ==
Geological maps of County Donegal show rock alignments running south-west to north east across the Fanad peninsula. The underlying rock in the peninsula is mostly of Dalradian meta-sedimentary rocks, which have been exposed by weathering and erosion over the millennia There are areas of Granodiorite igneous rocks across the northern end of the peninsula from Ballywhoriskey to Fanad Head, but the greater part of Fanad consist of Middle-Dalradian Quartzite and some Pellite rocks with local occurrences of Schists and Tillites – the latter mostly concentrated around the northern inlet of Mulroy Bay.

The cliffs around Fanad Head are of exposed Grandiorite, whereas the higher ground running south from Fanad Head to Portsalon is a band of Quartzite. Knockalla Mountain is also formed of Quartzite.

The landscape of Fanad has been shaped by geological processes which include the effects of periodic covering with ice sheets and glaciers as recently as 14,000 years ago. The retreat of the ice sheet had a major impact on Fanad and surrounding areas. It is speculated that much of Lough Swilly was may have been dry land which was flooded due to a rise in sea level within the last 10,000 years. Mulroy Bay may have been similarly formed at this time. The peat outcrops on the foreshore at White Strand north of Rathmullan contain the remainder of trees which were submerged by the advance of the sea in this area. Many of the beaches on the Fanad shoreline were formed at this time by glacial deposits which were subsequently reworked by the actions of waves and currents.

In common with much of the rest of Ireland, the post-glacial landscape gradually changed with rises in temperature from open tundra to one dominated by forests of pine, oak, alder, hazel and birch, with breaks in the canopy on the edges of the intervening expanses of lake and bog. This was probably the landscape which greeted the earliest settlers who ventured along the coastline in the late Mesolithic Period, possibly about 5,000 BC. There is archaeological evidence of human occupation of coastal areas of Inishowen at Dunaff and west of Horn Head during this period and it is reasonable to assume that Fanad also saw some transient occupation at this time.

The subsequent evolution of the landscape in Fanad probably owes more to human intervention than to natural forces, reflecting the shift from visits by Mesolithic hunters, fishers and gatherers to the introduction of primitive farming during the Neolithic period from 4,000 BC onwards. The tree-covered landscape of the Mesolithic period would have given way gradually to a more open countryside in arable areas, marking the beginning of the contemporary landscape of Fanad, with its mixture of arable land at lower levels, with scrub and gorse covered uplands, and bogs interspersed with occasional lakes and streams.

== History ==
=== Mesolithic and Neolithic periods ===
There is no specific evidence of human occupation of Fanad during the Mesolithic period (8,000–4,000 BC) though as noted already, it is reasonable to assume that there was some temporary occupation of coastal locations during this period. The earliest evidence of human settlement in Fanad is probably the existence of Megalithic court tombs in a variety of locations including Tyrladden, Drumhallagh Upper and Crevary Upper dating possibly from circa 4,000–3,500 BC. There are also portal tombs or dolmens from the Neolithic period including examples at Gortnavern south of Kerrykeel and above Saltpans on the Lough Swilly side of the peninsula. These are suggested as dating from circa 3,800–3,200 BC.

=== Bronze Age and Iron Age ===
Evidence of the occupation of Fanad during the Bronze Age (2,000 – 500 BC) continues in the form of tombs and related monuments. Three possible stone circles probably belonging to the Bronze Age have been identified near Rathmullan. Several cist burial sites which are thought to date from the Bronze Age were discovered in Fanad including a now destroyed group at a cairn at Killycolman near Rathmullan.

Ring forts (Cashels) and ornately carved stonework are features of Iron Age Donegal (500 BC – 400 AD) including such major monuments as Grianan Aileach. Evidence of ring forts has been found in 35–40 locations in Fanad, principally in coastal locations on both the Swilly and Mulroy coasts.

=== Early medieval period ===
Bealoideas and the earliest records suggest that Fanad was originally occupied by the Corpraige from whom St. Colmcille's mother Eithne is said to have come. The Corpraige may have occupied a territory as far south as the River Swilly and Binswilly Mountain including Gartan.

In the early 7th century, the Cenel Conaill, one of the tribes of Donegal said to be descended from Niall of the Nine Hostages (Gaelic: Niall Noigiallach) and who originated at Mag nItha in the Lower Finn Valley, started to expand into Fanad, possibly forcing the northward retreat of the Corpraige. All traces of the Corpraige had disappeared from the area by the 12th century. Congal Cennemigher Mac Fergus Fanad was high king of Ireland from 700 AD until his death in 710 AD. It is held that the royal seat of Cenel Connell power in Fanad was at Cashelmor in "between the waters" in the north-west of Fanad.

The Cenel Conail were subsequently reduced in power by the expansion of the Cenel Eoghain from Inishowen during the 8th century, particularly following the battle of Clóitech in 789 when the Cenél Conaill withdrew to territories south of Barnesmore. With the reduction of power of the Cenel Conaill, the territory of Fanad came under the control of the O'Breslins who were descended from Congel Cennemigher's son. During this era, there are records of attacks by Vikings on Fanad– specifically in Mulroy Bay at Kinnaweer near Milford in 921 AD.

=== Late medieval period ===
The power of the O'Breslins in Fanad lasted until sometime after 1263 when the Chieftains of Tir Conaill, the O'Donnells, granted the sub-chieftaincy of Fanad to the MacSweeneys (Gaelic: MacSuibhne) in return for their support of certain O'Donnell families in their struggle for chieftaincy of the clan.

The MacSweeneys who were galloglasses, (mercenary warriors) from Scotland, were responsible for the building of the castle and the Carmelite Monastery at Rathmullan at the end of the 16th century. The MacSweeneys were also responsible for the building of the tower house at Moross on the upper stretches of Mulroy Bay in about 1532.

=== 17th and 18th centuries ===
The power of the MacSweeneys as Lords of Fanad ended with the Flight of the Earls in 1607 and the subsequent Plantation of Ulster, though they continued to hold some lands in Fanad as proprietors until the 1641 rising, following which all remaining MacSweeney lands were confiscated. The "hereditary commandery" of Fanad remains in the MacSweeney's families.Leabhar Clainne Suibhne

Lands in Fanad were granted principally to servitors (Crown servants including veterans of the Nine Years War). Settlers noted in the 1654 Civil Survey include Richard Perkins at BelliclanmcCallen (sic), William and David Lyne at Bunintyne (Bunnaton?), John Rowly at Ballymastocker, Craveross (Croaghross?) and Magherawarden, Thomas Stewart at Carlan, Knockbrack and Drumfad, William Patton at Croghan, Colin and Patrick Campbell at Moross and Luke Ashe at Ballyhork. Some lands at Tullynadall were granted to the Provost and Fellows of Trinity College, Dublin.

Rathmullan was initially granted to Sir Ralph Bingley but was soon passed to his son-in-law, Bishop Knox. Rathmullan was incorporated as a town and in 1618, Knox modified the Carmelite Friary to serve as a manor house. It remained as the residence of the Knox family until the late eighteenth century. Also notable at this stage was the building of the Church of Ireland in Rosnakill in 1693.

Despite the plantation, Fanad retained its majority native population and Gaelic ways and Irish remained the principal spoken language of the peninsula – a situation that remained generally unchanged until the mid 19th century. The 18th century saw the introduction into Fanad of rural industry with a corresponding improvement in infrastructure. Rearing cattle commercially, herring fishing, flax growing and linen production came to feature in the local economy from the mid-18th century.

=== 19th century ===
By the early 19th century, manufacture of bent hats, shoes and kelp production were also evident. Rathmelton was a major focus of the linen industry and was stated to have had the largest bleaching green in Donegal during the late 18th century and early 19th century – a time of major prosperity in the town. It also thrived as a port at this time. However, linen and domestic shoe production went into decline by the 1820s and the herring fisheries had also declined. As a result, emigration became a greater feature of life as the local population increased.

Improvements in local infrastructure and facilities during the early part of the 19th century included the construction of a lighthouse at Fanad Head in 1818 in response to the sinking of the frigate HMS Saldanah in Lough Swilly in 1804. A Workhouse was constructed at Milford about 1840 and a network of National Schools emerged, some sponsored by landlord and some by churches and religious organisations. The early 19th century also saw the building of Roman Catholic places of worship starting with the building of the chapel at Massmount near Tamney about 1780 on a site donated by the Pattons of Croghan. Further building continued throughout the period including a chapel of ease in Fanavolty circa 1840.

In 1837, Samuel Lewis published a topographical dictionary which included the following contemporary description of the Parish of Clondavaddog: CLONDEVADOCK, or CLONDEVADOGUE, a parish, in the barony of KILMACRENAN, county of DONEGAL, and province of ULSTER, 15½ miles (N. by E.) from Letterkenny; containing 9595 inhabitants. This parish, which comprises, according to the Ordnance survey, 27,367¼: statute acres, of which 627¾ are water, is situated on the north-western coast; it comprehends the greater part of the peninsular district of Fannet, or Fanad, extending northward into the ocean, and terminating in the points called Maheranguna and Pollacheeny. The surface is for the most part occupied by mountains of considerable altitude, among which Knockalla is 1196 feet above the level of the sea: these are separated by deep and narrow vales, of which the soil is tolerably good, consisting of a brown gravelly mould, sometimes inclining to clay, on a basis of white gravel, brownish or reddish clay, slate of various colours, and sometimes soft freestone rock. The parish contains about 60 quarter lands of good arable and bad pasture, with much waste and barren land: many acres have been covered and destroyed by the shifting sands. The point of Fannet is in lat. 55° 15' 50" (N.) and lon. 7° 39' (W.): it is on the western side of the entrance of Lough Swilly, and a lighthouse has been erected on it, of which the lantern has an elevation of 90 feet above the level of the sea at high water; it consists of nine lamps, displaying a deep red light towards the sea, and a bright fixed light towards the lough or harbour, and may be seen in clear weather from a distance of 14 nautical miles. The seats are Croohan House, the residence of R. H. Patton, Esq.; Greenfort, of H. Babington, Esq.; and Springfield, of M. Dill, Esq.

The living is a rectory and vicarage, in the diocese of Raphoe, and in the patronage of the Provost and Fellows of Trinity College, Dublin: the tithes amount to £463.5.4½. The glebe-house was built by aid of a loan of £100 from the late Board of First Fruits, in 1795; the glebe comprises 240 acres, of which 160 are uncultivated. The church is a plain structure, towards the repairs of which the Ecclesiastical Commissioners have recently granted £371.10.3. The R. C. parish is co-extensive with that of the Established Church, and contains two large chapels. There are five schools, one of which, the parochial school, is partly supported by annual donations from the rector and the late Col. Robertson's school fund. In these about 250 boys and 130 girls are instructed; and there are two pay schools, in which are about 70 boys and 11 girls, and five Sunday schools.

The landscape evolved to reflect the development of local estates during this time. The existence of picturesque seascapes induced many local landowners to site "big houses" in parkland settings overlooking Lough Swilly and Mulroy Bay. In addition to the great houses listed by Lewis, other notable houses built during this era included Drumhalla House (1789) by Dr. Knox, Fort Royal in Rathmullan (1807) by Charles Wray, Rathmullan House (1820) by Lt. Col. Knox of Prehen and Glenalla House (1810) north of Rathmullan which was built by the Hart family.

The 19th century was furthermore a time of great change and upheaval in farming practice. In the first half of the century, many landowners began to introduce "improvements" to their holdings which effectively saw the end of the clachans and the old ways of farming based around the old Rundale system. The farm landscape of Fanad as we know it today, with small individual holdings and regularised boundaries was imposed from the 1830s onwards, often against the wishes of the tenant farmers. The introduction of these "improvements" saw the demise of some major centres of population in Fanad including the well established large villages of Doaghbeg and Glinsk. Emigration continued and grew as a response to the significant growth in population, and in response to the famine and food shortages including the Great Famine of the late 1840s. Fanad's population, which was estimated possibly about 4,000 in 1766, was 10,344 and rising in 1841. However, it had fallen to 8,244 by 1851 and continued to decline to a figure of 5,778 in 1891.

Rural tourism emerged about this time – Fanad features in an 1849 traveller's guide which notes, inter alia, that There are a few more romantic spots than Ramelton and its vicinity. The town contains three Presbyterian meeting-houses, a Methodist chapel and a church: the Roman Catholic chapel is at some distance. There are corn mills and stores, a brewery and a bleach green. Although there is no pier, some exports are made in such small vessels as sail up the harbour. Ramelton contains some good houses and two small inns at which cars can be hired...... Rathmullan, in its single street, church, battery and some vestiges of ecclesiastical and castellated ruins offers but little to arrest the attention of the traveller...Milford contains one or two public houses, a few shops, some respectable dwellings and in its vicinity a union workhouse.....The village of Rosnakill will not detain the traveller, it chiefly consists of poor cabins but it contains the parish church, some small retail shops and one or two public houses.......A good inn at Ballyvicstocker, one of the most lovely of all our sea bays and which is admirably suited to bathing, and where B. Barton Esq., the proprietor of the Greenfort Estate and one or two others have built comfortable villas, together with good roads from Ramelton and Rathmullan would tend to induce strangers to visit Fanad.

The second half of the 19th century witnessed a developing infrastructure of schools and other public buildings in the area. By c. 1858, schools had been established in a number of locations including Ballymichael, Doaghbeg, Ballyhiernan, Cashel Glebe, Tullyconnell, Croaghross, Leatbeg, Ballina, Muineagh, Drumfad and Glenvar. There was also a coastguard stations, police barracks and a dispensary and session house at Tamney.

The second half of the 19th century was marked by the killing of Lord Leitrim in 1878, who was assassinated by three men named Neil Shiels, Michael McElwee and Michael Heraghty. One of the major local landowners in Fanad and a man much reviled for his strictness in his dealing with his tenants, Leitrim held much of the northern part of Fanad, with holdings stretching from Glinsk to Doaghbeg. The time of Leitrim's death coincided with the Land War which ended the era of landlord domination of Fanad. In the decades that followed and with the passing of various Irish Land Acts, ownership of much of the land in Fanad passed from landlords to their tenant farmers. Other major landowners whose lands passed into the ownership of their tenants included the Bartons who owned large tracts and land in and around Portsalon, Henry Letham whose holdings were principally on the Mulroy side of the peninsula, north of Kerrykeel and Thomas Norman whose lands were situated around Tamney and Rosnakill, immediately north of Henry Letham's holdings.

=== 20th and 21st centuries ===
During the first half of the 20th century, Fanad, in common with other coastal areas of Donegal, settled into a pattern of subsistence farming. Employment outside of agriculture was very limited, leading to continuing high levels of migration both permanent and seasonal, some overseas to the UK and to the US, and some to cities in Ireland including Derry and to a lesser extent, Belfast and Dublin. The drop in population continued, with the population recorded as 2,846 in 1961 approximately a quarter of that recorded in the 1840s.

The 2006 census recorded a combined population of 2,131 for the electoral districts of Carrowkeel, Rosnakill, Fanad North and Fanad West. By this time, farming had declined significantly with limited livestock rearing as the main component of local agriculture. Local rural industry had grown to some extent with fish farming in Mulroy Bay and in Lough Swilly as the main local source of employment, albeit for a time in the late 20th century and early 21st century, construction was arguably a major source of local income reflecting the increase in the provision of holiday homes and a general upgrading of the local housing stock and infrastructure both in Fanad and in other areas of Donegal.

A notable addition to the local infrastructure was the construction of a major road bridge at the northern end of Mulroy Bay in 2009, allowing for improved access from Fanad westwards to Carrigart, Downings and other towns and villages along the northern coast. Tourism also provided some limited seasonal employment.

Some consolidation of local facilities has occurred over the last half century, reflecting the decline in population. There has been a consolidation of the National School network into a small number of larger facilities. Many local shops have closed, partly due to the population decline but also arguably due to the greater mobility of the population who now have the option to shop at the larger centres of population e.g. Letterkenny.

== Sport ==
The local association football club, Fanad United, play in the Ulster Senior League. They are the league's most successful club, having won fourteen titles. At national level they have won both the FAI Intermediate Cup and the FAI Youth Cup. The local GAA club is Fanad Gaels (Gaeil Fhánada).

== People ==
- Neil Blaney, politician

== See also ==
- Lighthouses in Ireland
