= Glen, County Donegal =

Village in County Donegal, Ireland

Coordinates: 54°38′49″N 8°10′40″W

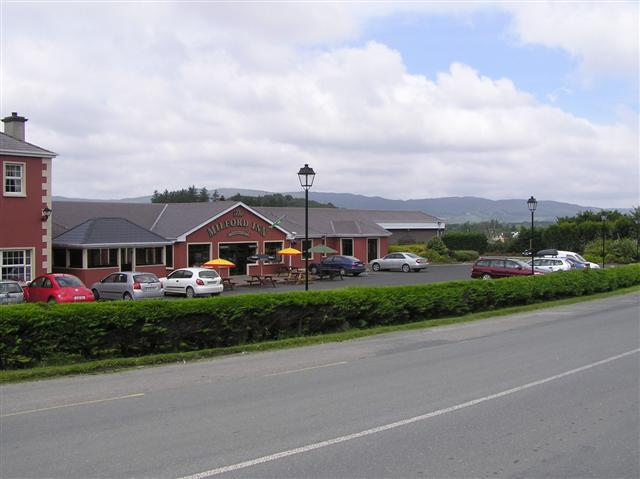
Milford Inn, Glen

Glen (Irish: An Gleann) is a small village in County Donegal, Ireland. The focus of the townlands of Glenmenagh and Glenineeny, it is within the parish of Mevagh, and the Barony of Kilmacrenan. The village is on the crossroads between the towns of Milford, Letterkenny, Creeslough, and Carrigart. The village once supported a schoolhouse, post office and shop, as well as historically a fair. Today, however, one of the few businesses left is the historic local public house, originally a shebeen and dating from the 17th century.

== See also ==
- List of populated places in the Republic of Ireland
