= R247 road (Ireland) =

Road in Ireland

Coordinates: 55.041765°N 7.646271°W

R247 road
- Bóthar R247
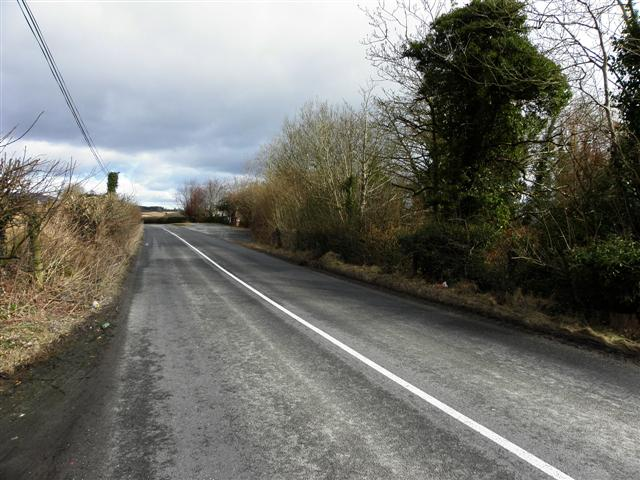
- R247 at Carn Low

Route information
- Length: 42.3 km (26.3 mi)

Major junctions
- From: Fanad Lighthouse
- R246 Kerrykeel; R268 Saltpans; Passes through Rathmullan
- To: R245 Ramelton

Location
- Country: Ireland

Highway system
- Roads in Ireland; Motorways; Primary; Secondary; Regional

The R247 road is a regional road in Ireland, located in Fanad, County Donegal.
