= R245 road (Ireland) =

Regional road in County Donegal, Ireland

R245 road
- Bóthar R245
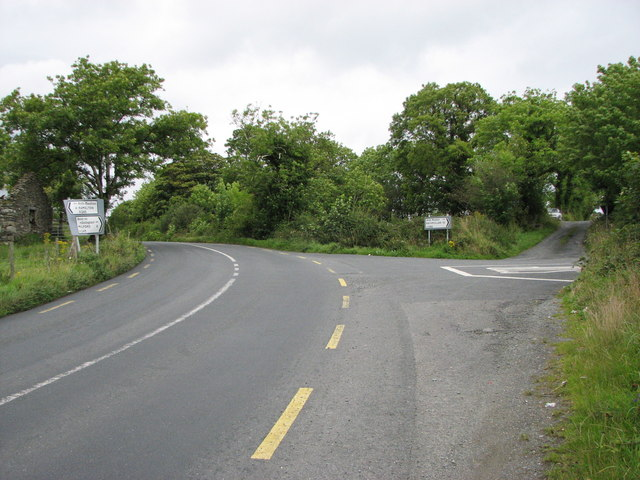
- R245 between Ramelton and Milford

Route information
- Length: 44.9 km (27.9 mi)

Major junctions
- From: N56 at Middle Road, Letterkenny, County Donegal
- R247 at Ramelton; R249 at Ramelton; R246 at Milford; R248 at Carrigart
- To: N56 at Rosscad

Location
- Country: Ireland

Highway system
- Roads in Ireland; Motorways; Primary; Secondary; Regional
← R244	→ R246

The R245 road is a regional road in Ireland. It is a loop road from the N56 road in County Donegal. Sections of the road form part of the Wild Atlantic Way.

The R245 travels north from the N56 at Letterkenny to Ramelton. From Ramelton the road travels north again to Milford and then along Mulroy Bay before turning west to Carrigart. At Carrigart, the R248 road leads to the Rosguill Peninsula and its Atlantic Drive. From Carrigart the R245 turns southwest crossing the Lackagh River before rejoining the N56. The R245 is 44.9 km (27.9 mi) long.
