= R248 road (Ireland) =

Road in Ireland

Coordinates: 55.194409°N 7.840137°W

R248 road
- Bóthar R248

Route information
- Length: 4.3 km (2.7 mi)

Major junctions
- From: R245 Carraig Airt
- To: Downings

Location
- Country: Ireland

Highway system
- Roads in Ireland; Motorways; Primary; Secondary; Regional

The R248 road is a short regional road in Ireland, located in County Donegal.
