= Ramelton =

Town in County Donegal, Ulster, Ireland

Ramelton Ráth Mealtain
- Town
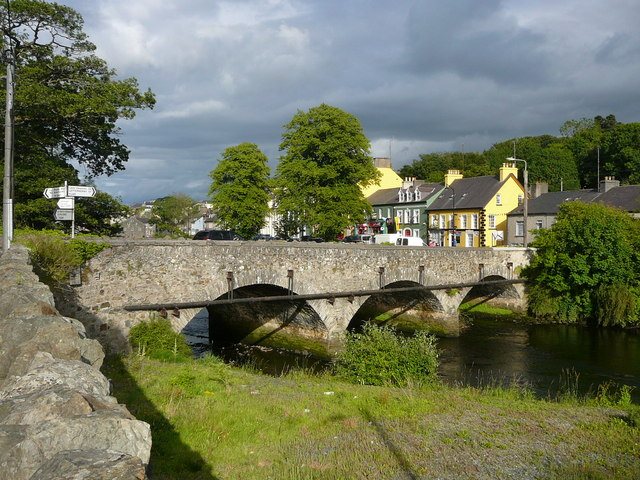
- Bridge over the River Lennon in Ramelton

- Location in Ireland
- Coordinates: 55°02′08″N 7°38′44″W
- Country: Ireland
- Province: Ulster
- County: County Donegal
- Elevation: 20 m (66 ft)

Population (2022)
  - Total: 1,288
- Irish Grid Reference: C228212

Ramelton (rə-MEL-tun; Irish: Ráth Mealtain), also Rathmelton, is a town and townland in County Donegal, Ireland. As of 2022, its population was 1,288.

== Location ==
Ramelton is situated at the mouth of the River Lennon, on the western shores of Lough Swilly. It is 10 km north-east of Letterkenny and 7 km south-east of Milford, on the R245 road.

== History ==
The town is named after Mealtan, an early Gaelic chieftain: the town's Irish name of Ráth Mealtain means "the fort of Mealtan". The fort is said to lie under the ruins of a medieval castle of the O'Donnells, the ruling family of West Donegal before their exile to mainland Europe in 1607.

Ramelton was settled by English and Scots planters during the Ulster Plantation of the 17th century and is the site of the oldest Presbyterian church in Ireland.

The locality is the ancestral home of U.S. president James Buchanan, from which his father, also James Buchanan, emigrated to the United States in 1783.

== Facilities ==
Ramelton is served by many shops and services within the town. The Town Hall in Ramelton was built in the late 19th century and still has a vital role in the community today.

The town has three main churches: St. Mary's Catholic Church, St. Paul's Church of Ireland (Parish of Tullyaughnish), and the Presbyterian Church.

The town is served by two local bus operators that connect Ramelton to Letterkenny, the largest town in County Donegal, and to several other towns in the north of the county. Local Link number 300 runs between Letterkenny, Ramelton and Fanad Lighthouse, via Rathmullan, Kerrykeel, Portsalon and Ballylar; and the number 974, operated by Patrick Gallagher Travel, runs between Letterkenny, Ramelton and Downings, via Milford, Cranford, Glen and Carrigart. In addition, John McGinley Coach Travel runs a service between Ramelton and Letterkenny in order for people to connect to their onward coach service to Dublin.

== Music and sport ==
The town is home to a marching band which frequently wins prizes in the Miscellaneous Marching Bands (Buíon Rogha Gléas) category of the All-Ireland Fleadh.

Swilly Rovers Football Club is based in the town. It was founded in 1929. It also has a tennis club.

== Other ==
The town is home to McDaid's soft drinks manufacturer whose drinks are sold throughout Donegal and further afield. Its most famous drink is the Football Special which was originally produced to celebrate the successes of Swilly Rovers Football Club.

The town was the setting for the 1995 television serial The Hanging Gale, which told of the Great Famine of the 19th century.

Ramelton is also a key setting for the A.E.W. Mason novel The Four Feathers.

The town has hosted the Lennon Festival, a village fair, since 1970. Ramelton is a Fáilte Ireland designated Heritage Town.

The town is also the setting for Django Sur Lennon gypsy jazz festival which has been held in the town since 2015 and has featured gypsy jazz musicians from Europe and beyond.

== Notable people ==
- Catherine Black, private nurse to King George V
- Robert E. Bonner, American publisher, born Ramelton
- Ronan Boyce, professional footballer
- William C. Campbell, scientist, Nobel laureate in Physiology or Medicine in 2015
- Will Carruthers, writer and musician with Spacemen 3, Spiritualized and The Brian Jonestown Massacre
- Patsy Gallacher, association football player with Celtic F.C
- Dave Gallaher, All Blacks rugby captain, author and WW1 soldier
- Roy Greenslade
- Arthur Gwynn, cricket and rugby union player
- Edward Gwynn, scholar of Old Irish and Celtic literature
- John Tudor Gwynn, cricket player
- Lucius Gwynn, cricket and rugby union player
- Robert Gwynn, cricket player
- Conrad Logan, professional footballer
- Francis Makemie, clergyman, the founder of Presbyterianism in the United States
- William McAdoo, American Democratic Party politician
- Basil McCrea, MLA, Leader of NI21 in the Northern Ireland Assembly
- Anne-Marie McDaid, rower and paralympian.
- Walter Patterson, first British Governor of Prince Edward Island

== See also ==
- List of towns and villages in the Republic of Ireland
