= Oileán Ruaidh =

Island in County Donegal, Ireland

Island Roy
Native name: Oileán Ruaidh
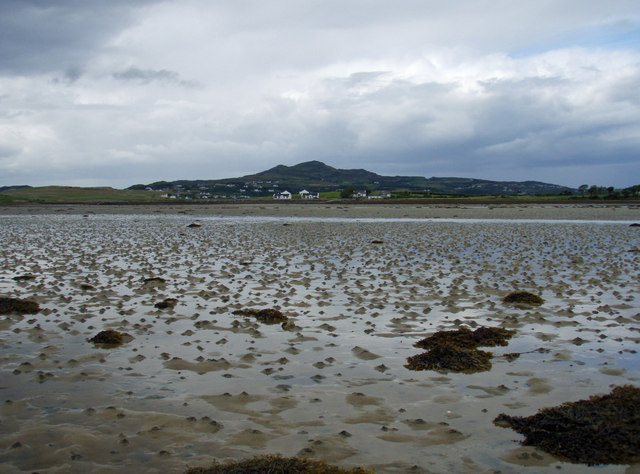

- Location within island of Ireland

Geography
- Location: Atlantic Ocean
- Coordinates: 55°11′22″N 7°47′40″W
- Area: 37.1 km^{2} (14.3 sq mi)

Administration
- Ireland
- Province: Ulster
- County: Donegal

Demographics
- Population: 26

Oileán Ruaidh (Irish: red island), anglicised as Island Roy, also called Oileán an Bhráighe (Irish: island of the captive), is a small island in Mulroy Bay, County Donegal, Ireland.

== Geography ==
Oileán Ruaidh is low lying, gravel-based, and occupies 91.46 acres (37.01 ha; 0.14291 sq mi). It has green fields, abundant growth of seaweed - used for healthy bathing - and the landscape has views of Rossapenna's sand-dunes, the surrounding Mulroy coastline, and the Donegal hills.

The island is located approximately 3.5 miles from the mainland villages of Downings and Carrigart.

== Etymology ==
The island was formerly known as Oileán an Bhráighe, meaning 'island of the prisoners,' which is its official name. It formerly had links with Doe Castle on Rossapenna, so this probably explains the origin of that name.

The present name, Oileán Ruaidh, means 'red island,' so called for the vibrant rusty colour of the vegetation in winter. The English name, 'Island Roy' is an anglicisation created by surveyors in the 19th century.

== History ==
There has been continuous settlement here for several hundred if not thousands of years, and most of the island's residents are descended from original settlers.

The island faced desertion in the early 19th century when Lord Leitrim sought to banish his tenants and put the island's pastures to use for cattle grazing. His plans were thwarted by a female resident who held a 99-year lease on her land, and so all the tenants were allowed to remain and the island was saved for its people.

Today, 26 people live on the island, though it held over 65 some decades ago. Farming, shellfish-rearing, and tourism are the main ways of life of the islanders. They have invested in new infrastructure to cater for the growing visitor demand.

A nickel-iron meteorite found on the surface of the planet Mars by the Opportunity rover in 2010 was named Oileán Ruaidh by scientists at the Jet Propulsion Laboratory in Pasadena, California.
