= Carrowkeel =

Carrowkeel (from the Irish 'an Cheathrú Chaol', meaning 'the narrow quarter') may refer to several places in Ireland:

- Carrowkeel, County Galway, a townland
- Carrowkeel Megalithic Cemetery, County Sligo
- Kerrykeel, County Donegal, known as Carrowkeel in census returns, is a village by Mulroy Bay
- Quigley's Point, sometimes known as Carrowkeel, is a village in County Donegal, north of Derry, on Lough Foyle
