= Cranford, County Donegal =

Village in County Donegal, Ireland

Coordinates: 55°09′N 7°42′W

Cranford (Irish: Cluan Glas Creamhghort, meaning "field of wild garlic") is a small village located in the northeast of County Donegal, Ireland. It is situated on the western banks of Mulroy Bay on the road between two larger villages, approximately 7.9 kilometres north of Milford and 7.9 kilometres south of Carrigart. It looks almost directly at Kerrykeel across the water. The townlands of Drimicallady, Coole, The Bogue, Woodquarter, The Pans, and Seantullagh also fall within Cranfords borders.

== Sport ==
It is home to the Cranford Athletics club which was founded in 1962. The clubs enters athletes in a variety of competitions every year. The club runs the annual Bill Hunter memorial race on 26 December every year.
