= R249 road (Ireland) =

Road in Ireland

Coordinates: 55.040249°N 7.718689°W

R249 road
- Bóthar R249
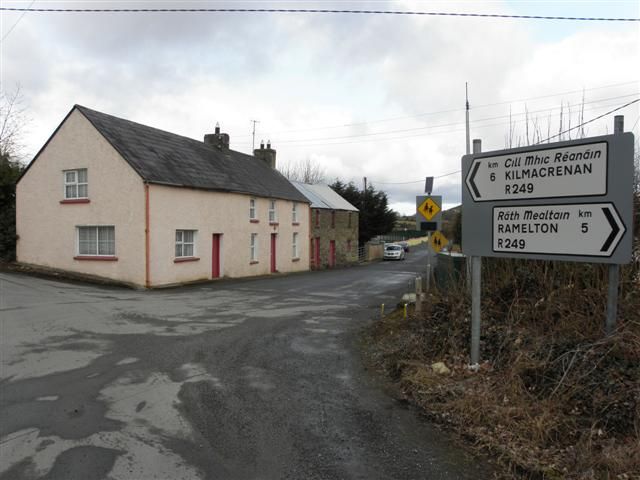
- The R249 at Drumman

Route information
- Length: 8.7 km (5.4 mi)

Major junctions
- From: N56 Kilmacrennan
- R246 Tawny Lower; Crosses River Lennon
- To: R245 Ramelton

Location
- Country: Ireland

Highway system
- Roads in Ireland; Motorways; Primary; Secondary; Regional

The R249 road is a regional road in Ireland, located in County Donegal.
