= Gartan Lough =

Lake in County Donegal, Ireland

- Loch Gartáin (Irish)
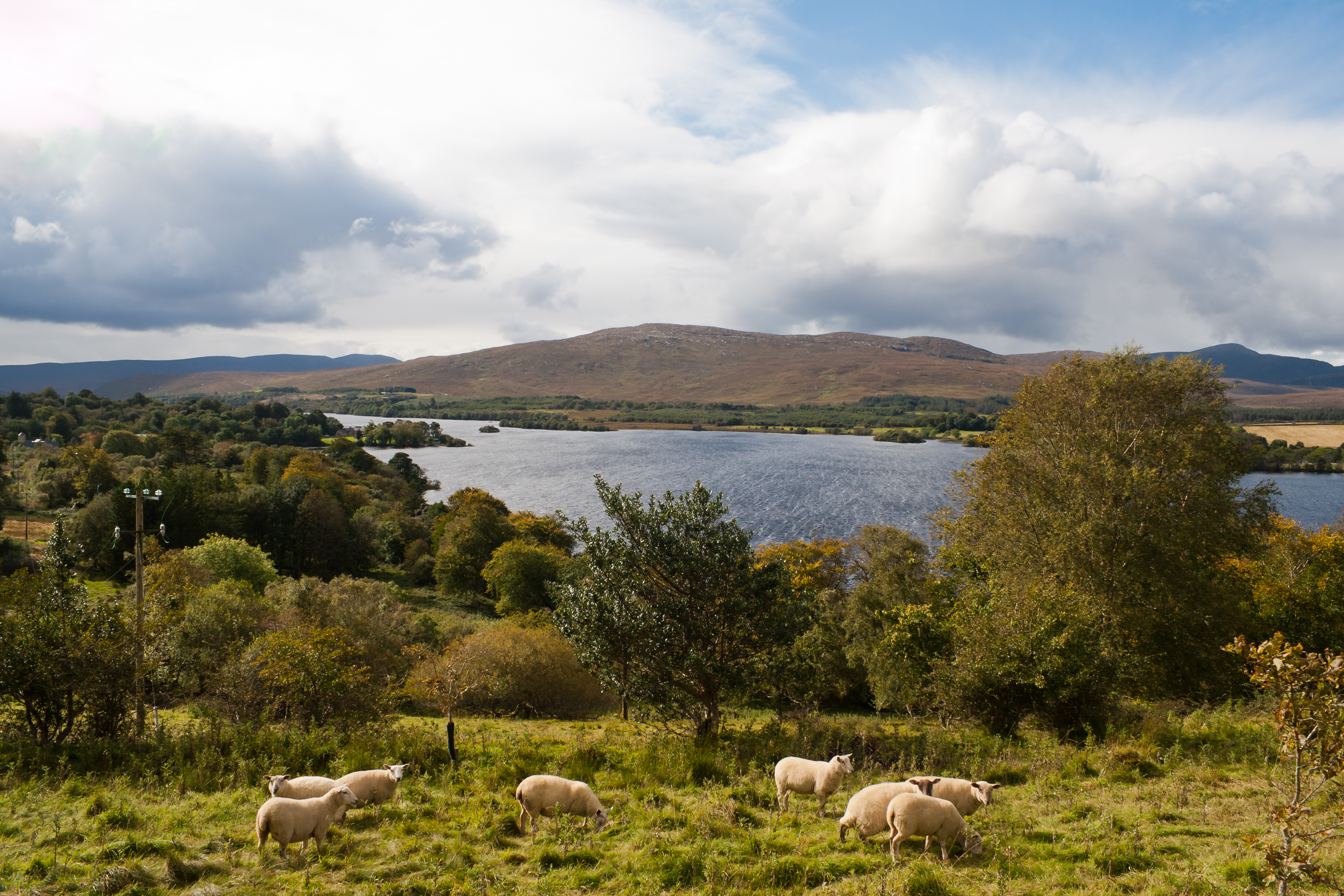

- Location in Ireland
- Location: County Donegal
- Coordinates: 54°59′33″N 7°55′5″W
- Primary inflows: Bullaba River
- Primary outflows: River Leannan
- Catchment area: 77.44 km^{2} (29.9 sq mi)
- Basin countries: Ireland
- Max. length: 3.7 km (2 mi)
- Max. width: 0.5 km (0.3 mi)
- Surface area: 2.05 km^{2} (0.79 sq mi)
- Surface elevation: 67 m (220 ft)

Gartan Lough (Irish: Loch Gartáin), also known as Lough Beagh South, is a freshwater lake in the northwest of Ireland. It is located in north County Donegal close to the eastern boundary of Glenveagh National Park.

== Geography ==
Gartan Lough is about 15 kilometres (9 mi) west of Letterkenny. It measures about 4 km (2.5 mi) long and 0.5 km (0.3 mi) wide.

== Hydrology ==
Gartan Lough is fed by the Bullaba River entering at its southern end. The lake drains northeastwards into the River Leannan, which in turn enters Lough Fern.

== Natural history ==
Fish species in Gartan Lough include Arctic char. Gartan Lough is part of the Leannan River Special Area of Conservation.

== See also ==
- List of loughs in Ireland
