= Gortnavern =

Townland in County Donegal, Ireland

Gortnavern Gort na bhFearn
- Townland
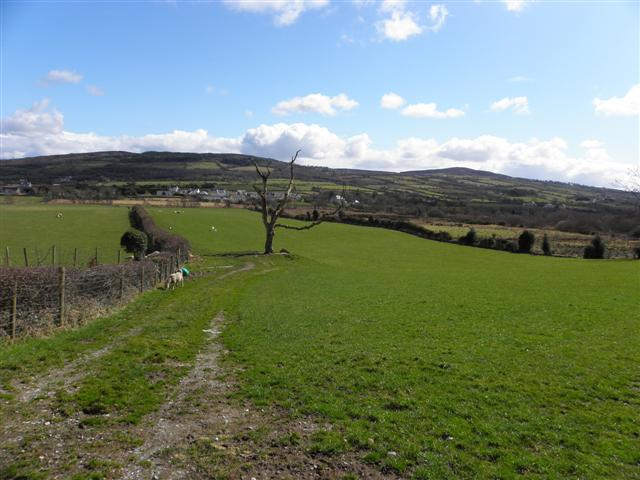
- View across the southeastern part of Gortnavern

- Location in Ireland
- Coordinates: 55°01′23″N 7°43′45″W
- Country: Ireland
- Province: Ulster
- County: County Donegal

Area
  - Total: 2.65 km^{2} (1.02 sq mi)
- Elevation: 83 m (272 ft)

Population (2011)
  - Total: 107
  - Density: 40.4/km^{2} (105/sq mi)
- Time zone: UTC+0 (WET)
  - Summer (DST): UTC-1 (IST (WEST))
- Irish Grid Reference: C171195

Gortnavern (Irish: Gort na bhFearn) is a townland in County Donegal, Ireland. Located in the historic barony of Kilmacrenan, Gortnavern has an area of approximately 2.6 square kilometres (1 sq mi), and the townland had a population of 107 people as of the 2011 census.

Gortnavern is also the name of an electoral division of Letterkenny, which had a population of 1,191 as of the 2016 census.

The Gortavern dolmen is located off R247 with a view of Mulroy Bay.

== See also ==
- List of populated places in the Republic of Ireland
