= Catherine Black (nurse) =

Nurse to King George V

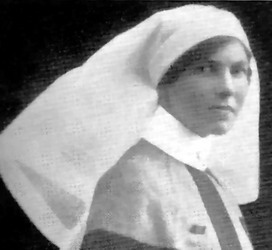
- Born: 12 June 1878; Ramelton, County Donegal, Ireland
- Died: 7 October 1949 (aged 71)
- Known for: Nurse to King George V
- Medical career
- Profession: Nurse
- Institutions: The London Hospital
- Sub-specialties: Field hospital nursing

Catherine Black, MVO, MBE, RRC, SRN (12 June 1878 – 7 October 1949), also known as "Blackie", served in World War I and was the private nurse to King George V. She was known as 'the Kings Nurse'.

== Family and early life ==
Catherine Black was born on 12 June 1878 in Ramelton, County Donegal in Ardeen House on the outskirts of the town. Her father was a linen draper with a prosperous shop in the town. From February 1901 she nursed at the Royal Sea Bathing Hospital in Margate- referred to in her autobiography as 'Southgate'. In 1903 Black became a probationer nurse at The London Hospital under Matron Eva Luckes and qualified in 1905. In 1909 when Black was working as a private nurse for the same doctor who was in charge of the hospital which Edith Cavell ran in Brussels. Luckes put them in touch but although Black and Cavell never physically met they talked together on the phone a few times before Black returned from her assignment.

== World War I service ==
Black was working as a private nurse at The London Hospital when the outbreak of World War I was declared. She joined Queen Alexandra's Imperial Military Nursing Service, first serving in Cambridge Hospital in Aldershot and then the No. 7 Hospital in St Omer where she treated soldiers suffering from shell shock. Black was then sent as a replacement for a nurse who was killed at a casualty clearing station at Poperinghe, Belgium, and subsequently went on to serve at the 41st Stationary Hospital at Sailly-Lorette, nursing soldiers with self-inflicted wounds. She was moved to the No. 5 General Hospital in Rouen and various other clearing stations until the end of the war.

== King George V ==
Sister Black was the private nurse of King George V from 1928 until his death in 1936. She began her service in late 1928 following a serious bout of illness for the King. Black was made permanent in 1930; she was given her own chambers within Buckingham Palace. She was known as "Blackie" to the members of the royal family.

Black objected to the actions of the King's doctor Lord Dawson of Penn in administering a lethal combination of morphine and cocaine to hasten the King's death. The King's final words, "God damn you!", were addressed to Black as she gave him a sedative on the night before his death.

== Later life ==
Black wrote of her life in the Palace in her autobiography King's Nurse, Beggar's Nurse, in which she also recounted her childhood in Donegal, nursing in Australia, as well as her service in WWI. In reflecting on the experiences of nurses in the war, Black recounted "you went into [a casualty-clearing station] young and light-hearted. You came out older than any span of years could make you."

She died on 7 October 1949 in London.

== Honours ==
- Member of the Victorian Order (Fourth Class)- 1938
- Member of the British Empire -1929
- Royal Red Cross -1929
