= Lough Fern =

Lake in north County Donegal, Ireland

- Loch Fearna (Irish)
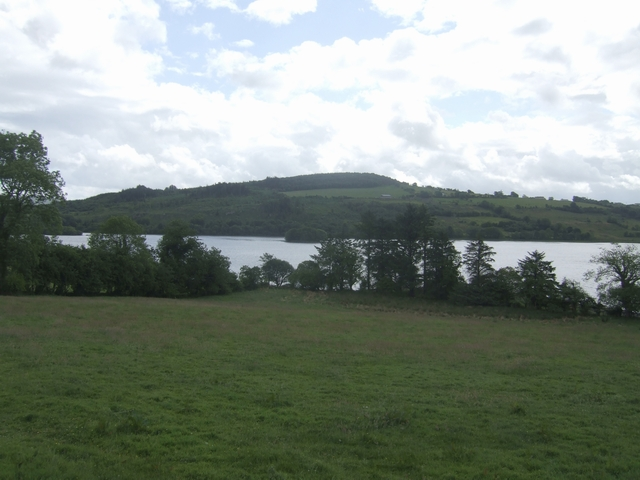

- Location in Ireland
- Location: County Donegal
- Coordinates: 55°3′32″N 7°43′9″W
- Primary inflows: River Leannan
- Primary outflows: River Leannan
- Catchment area: 206.17 km^{2} (79.6 sq mi)
- Basin countries: Ireland
- Max. length: 2.3 km (1 mi)
- Max. width: 0.8 km (0.5 mi)
- Surface area: 1.81 km^{2} (0.70 sq mi)
- Average depth: 2 m (6 ft 7 in)
- Max. depth: 3 m (10 ft)
- Surface elevation: 18.7 m (61 ft)
- Islands: 2

Lough Fern (Irish: Loch Fearna) is a freshwater lake in the northwest of Ireland. It is located in north County Donegal near the town of Milford.

== Geography ==
Lough Fern is about 2 kilometres (1.2 mi) south of Milford, on the R246 road, and 10 kilometres (6 mi) north of Letterkenny. It measures about 2 km (1.2 mi) long and 0.8 km (0.5 mi) wide. The lake has two islands at its northern end, including one crannog.

== Hydrology ==
Lough Fern is fed mainly by the River Leannan entering at its southern end and also by a stream entering at the northern end. The lake drains eastwards into the continuation of the Leannan, which in turn enters Lough Swilly at Rathmelton.

== Natural history ==
Fish species in Lough Fern include brown trout, salmon, three-spined stickleback, perch and the critically endangered European eel. Lough Fern is part of the Leannan River Special Area of Conservation.

== See also ==
- List of loughs in Ireland
