= Ralph Bingley =

Welsh soldier who settled in Ireland

- Born: c.1570 Hawarden, Flintshire, Wales
- Died: 1627; Saint-Martin-de-Ré, France
- Cause of death: Killed in action
- Occupation: soldier

Sir Ralph Bingley (c.1570–1627) was a Welsh soldier who served and settled in Ireland.

Born in Hawarden, Flintshire, Bingley served as an officer under Sir Henry Docwra, as part of the expedition to establish garrisons in Derry and the Lough Foyle during Tyrone's Rebellion (1594–1603). Following its capture, Bingley was placed in command of Rathmullan. In 1602, he was granted land near Rathmullan by the Crown as a reward for his services. In the Plantation of Ulster he was granted 1,100 acres in Kilmacrennan, including the town of Rathmullan. His brother Richard Bingley also served in Ireland and became a landowner in the Plantation, with northern County Donegal becoming a centre of Welsh settlement due to the influence of the brothers.

During O'Doherty's Rebellion of 1608 he returned to active service with the Irish Army, following the Burning of Derry. In 1624, he was elected Mayor of Derry. He was a strong supporter of George Villiers, 1st Duke of Buckingham and led a force of Irish troops to serve under him at the Siege of La Rochelle. He was killed during the battle of the Pont du Feneau.

== Bibliography ==
- Bardon, Jonathan. The Plantation of Ulster. Gill & MacMillan, 2012.
- Hunter, R. J. "Sir Ralph Bingley, c. 1570-1627: Ulster Planter." In Ulster Transformed: Essays on Plantation and Print Culture c. 1590-1641, edited by John Morrill, 86-101. [Belfast]: Ulster Historical Foundation in association with Geography Publications, 2012.
- McGurk, John. Sir Henry Docwra, 1564-1631: Derry's Second Founder. Dublin: Four Courts Press, 2006.
- Morgan, Rhys. The Welsh and the Shaping of Early Modern Ireland, 1558-1641. Boydell & Brewer, 2014.
