= Richard Bingley =

Welsh soldier, settler in Ireland

Richard Bingley was a Welsh soldier who served in Ireland. In 1610 Bingley was appointed Constable of Doe Castle, Donegal. He was granted a significant estate as part of the Plantation of Ulster. Along with his elder brother Sir Ralph Bingley, he turned County Donegal into a centre of Welsh settlement.

== Bibliography ==
- Bardon, Jonathan (2012). The Plantation of Ulster. Gill & MacMillan.
- Morgan, Rhys (2014). The Welsh and the Shaping of Early Modern Ireland, 1558-1641. Boydell & Brewer.
