= Rosguill =

Peninsula in County Donegal, Ireland

Coordinates: 55°12′N 7°50′W

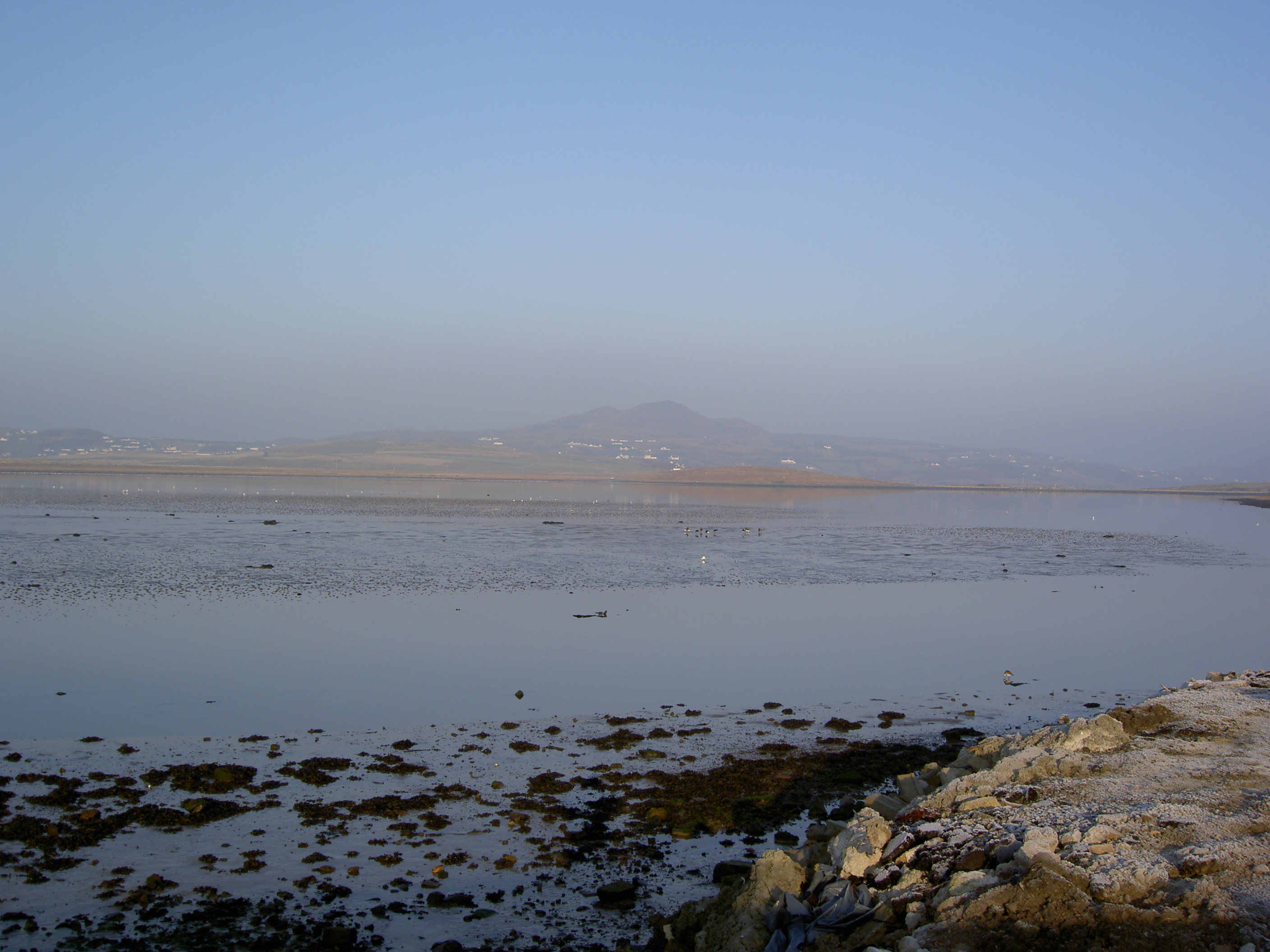
Gainne Mhór from Carrigart.

Rosguill (Irish language and official name: Ros Goill) is a peninsula situated in the north-north-west of County Donegal on the north coast of Ulster, the northern province in Ireland. Lying between the peninsulae of Fanad to the east and Horn Head to the west, Rosguill is a dichotomy of heathland and ocean. Sheephaven Bay lies on the western side of the peninsula, while Mulroy Bay lies on the eastern side. Between, a mixture of bog, hill and pastureland, the ancient walls, remnants of cattle enclosures, and the various evidences of fortification are proof of the area's use since antiquity. The Parish of Rosguill is an alternative name for the Parish of Mevagh, which covers the peninsula and an equally sized hinterland.

There are nearly 800 people living in Rosguill electoral division, while 33% of residents are native Irish speakers.

== History and folklore ==
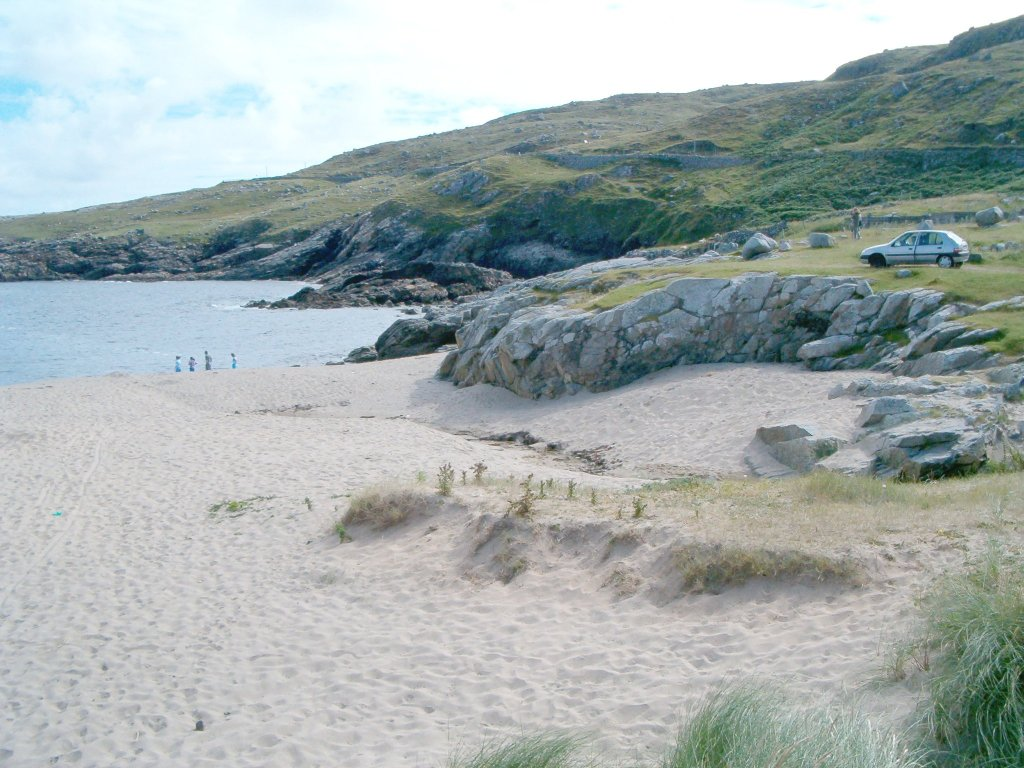
The beach at Dumhaigh / Dooey.

The area is heavy with legend; the name itself is supposed to have originated when Fionn mac Cumhaill finally obtained justice by killing Goll mac Morna, the slayer of his father. This act is traditionally said to have taken place at a rock called Carraic Ghoill (English: Carrickguill) lying off the townland of Dumhaigh (English: Dooey). The entire area became known as the "Headland of Goll" or Ros Goill.

Deirdre and Naoise are thought to have camped on the strand of Trá Mhór (Tramore, also known as Rosapenna Strand) when fleeing from Conchobar mac Nessa, the King of Ulster, and his Knights of the Red Branch.

The highest points on the peninsula are Gainne Mhór (English: Ganiamore) and its sister peak, Gainne Bheag. The name derives from Gráinne, betrothed of Fionn mac Cumhaill and lover of Diarmuid Ua Duibhne. While fleeing Fionn's Fianna warriors en route to Scotland, legend has it that they rested on the hill. Considerable damage to the south western face of Gainne has been the result of unrestrained excavation in recent years.

In the late 4th century, the son of Niall Noigíallach and the eponym of County Donegal (Tír Conaill), Conall Gulban, defeated the warriors of Ulaid, at Ballyshannon and Barnesmore. Conall's army chased the fleeing Ulstermen through Goll (Rosguill), Crích Chloinne Rosa, Crích Ua nDuach, Caim-Fhersaid Mhór, to the shores of Lough Foyle. Conalll Gulban and his brother, Eógan, became the ancestors of the Kings of Tír Conaill (Tyrconnell) and Tír Eógain (Tyrone) respectively.

=== Colm Cille ===
In common with many other areas of Ulster, Rosguill has its share of legends relating to St. Colm Cille. Colm Cille was a nobleman born at Gartan, a great-grandson of Conall Gulban, he took holy orders and began proselytising throughout Ireland. Prior to his exile in Dál Riata and the Kingdom of the Picts, Colm Cille founded monasteries at Derry and Kells, and is accredited with the founding of many more smaller establishments. Of these the Old church at Mevagh, in Clontallagh townland is said to one. Colm Cille also is said to have erected the High cross in the churchyard, on which allegedly he left the track of his fingers in the stone. Furthermore, he spread curses and blessings on various townlands in the parish in equal measure to the hospitality he received: Dundoan Upper was cursed to always have a fool amongst its community, after they mocked him, whereas he prophesied that no-one from Dooey or Island Roy would ever drown. His supposed footprints are to be found on a rock in Downings.

=== 1800s ===
The crop rotation in use in Rosguill at the start of the 19th century was potatoes, barley, oats and flax.

Pynnar's survey was carried out in 1618 by Captain Nicolas Pynnar to verify that the conditions agreed to by the 'Planters' during the Plantation of Ulster were being carried out.

== Today ==
There is a wealth of activities available locally: Angling, Hiking, Golf and Watersports. One of the most eastern of all Gaeltachtaí, the area has a vibrant cultural tradition, with many artists and musicians residing in the area

Rosguill has been victim to some extent to, the short sighted planning of the 1990s, and to the almost absence of applied legislation previously and, like a great deal of the west coast of the country, has suffered from unchecked ribbon development. However, one can easily escape this, except in the main settlements, to find an Ireland of centuries past.

Downings Harbour, on Sheephaven Bay, is fast becoming a world class big game fishing destination. Each autumn, sport fishing charter boats use Downings as the launching point for giant bluefin tuna fishing charters. See for additional information.

== Townlands ==
The western side of the Rosguill peninsula and its townlands are known colloquially as "The Bottom" and the eastern side is known as "The Far side". The townlands on the mainland are known as "The Upper Part".

The peninsula of Rosguill consists of nineteen Townlands:

- Melmore
- Gortnalughoge
- Dundoan lower
- Dundoan upper
- Glenoory
- Dooey
- Glebe
- Clontallagh
- Ardbane
- Derryhassen
- Downings
- Crocknamurleog
- Larganreagh
- Magerabeg
- Kinnelargy
- Rosapenna
- Island Roy
- Ballyoghagan

There are a further thirty one townlands in the parish of Rosguill (Mevagh):

- Finner
- Magheramagowrgan
- Umlagh
- Carrigart
- Tirlaughan
- Gortnabrade
- Rawros
- Aughalatty
- Carrick
- Devlinreagh
- Devlinmore
- Tullagh
- Meenacross
- Drumfin
- Glenkeo
- Downings Barr
- Dunmore
- Kill
- Carnagore
- Glenree
- Aughadahor
- Creevy
- Drumlackagh
- Drumdutton
- Glenmenagh
- Glengillagrana High
- High Glen
- Meenformla
- Meenlaragh
- Glenereragh
- Toragh
- Glenineeny

== Notable natives ==
- The Most Rev. Dr Philip Boyce, Lord Bishop of Raphoe from 1995 until 2017.
- The Most Rev. Dr Daniel McGettigan, Lord Archbishop of Armagh from 1870 until his death in 1887.
