= R268 road (Ireland) =

Road in County Donegal, Ireland

Coordinates: 55.188277°N 7.609554°W

R268 road
- Bóthar R268
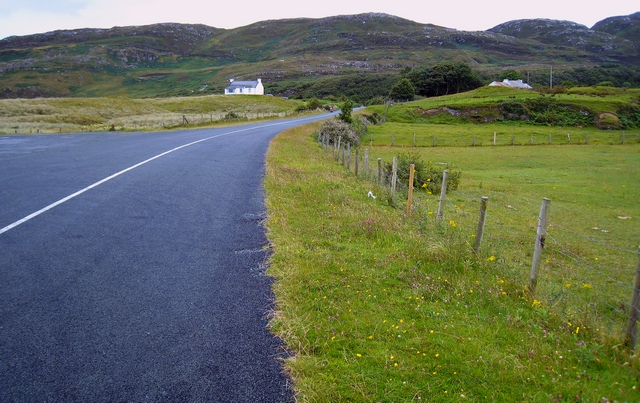
- R268 road south of Portsalon

Route information
- Length: 12.4 km (7.7 mi)

Major junctions
- From: R246 Greenfort Demesne
- Crosses Glenbar River and Drumhallagh River
- To: R247 Saltpans

Location
- Country: Ireland

Highway system
- Roads in Ireland; Motorways; Primary; Secondary; Regional

The R268 road is a regional road in Ireland, located in County Donegal, on the west bank of Lough Swilly.
