= Oileán Ruaidh (Mars rock) =

Meteorite found on Mars

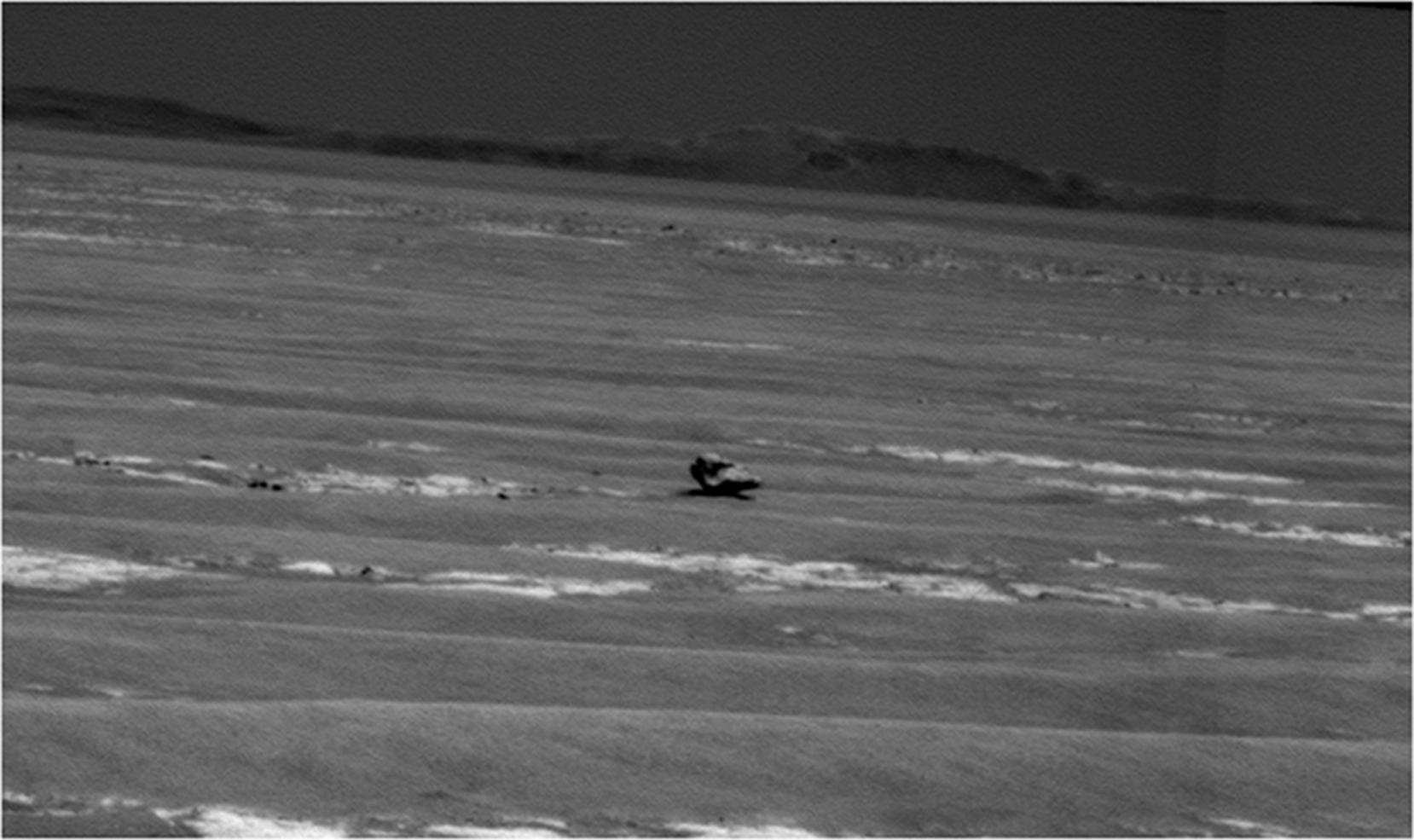
- A picture of the rock taken by Opportunity rover while it was 31 meters away.
- Type: Iron meteorite
- Found date: September 2010
- Related media on Wikimedia Commons

Oileán Ruaidh (pronounced "ill-lawn roo-ah") is a rock discovered on Mars in September 2010 by the Opportunity rover. It is a 45 centimeter wide dark rock that is thought to be an iron meteorite. It was given the name Oileán Ruaidh ("Red Island") after the Irish language name of Oileán Ruaidh island in County Donegal in Ireland.

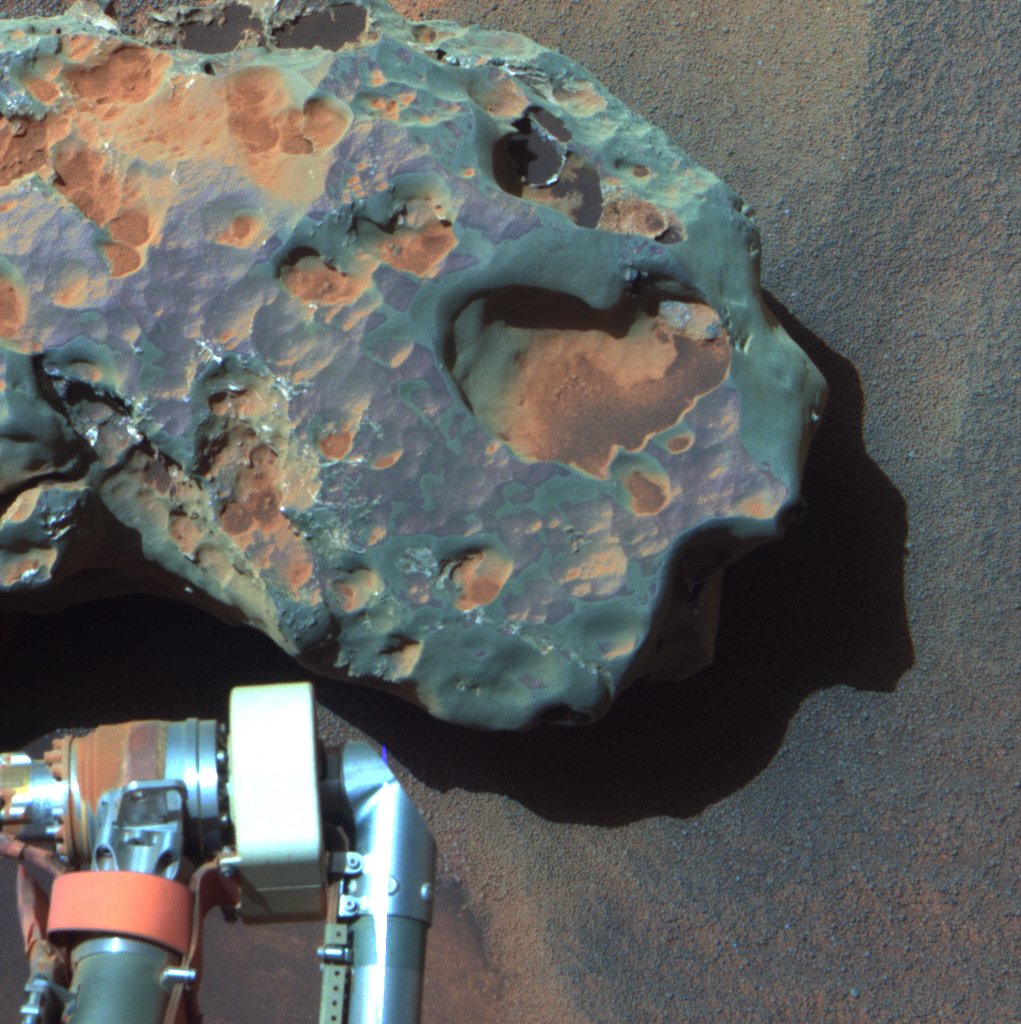
A close-up of the meteorite (September 24, 2010).

== See also ==
- Atmospheric reentry – Passage of an object through the gases of an atmosphere from outer space
- Block Island meteorite – Iron meteorite on Mars
- Bounce Rock – Football-sized primarily pyroxene rock found in the Margaritifer Sinus quadrangle of Mars
- Glossary of meteoritics
- Heat Shield Rock – Basketball-sized iron-nickel meteorite found on Mars
- List of rocks on Mars – Alphabetical list of named rocks and meteorites found on Mars
- Mackinac Island meteorite – Martian meteorite
- Mars – Fourth planet from the Sun
- Mars Exploration Rover – NASA mission to explore Mars via two rovers
- Shelter Island meteorite – Meteorite on Mars
- List of surface features of Mars imaged by Opportunity – Features recorded by 2004–2018 missions
