= Rathmullan Battery =

Fort in County Donegal

Coordinates: 55.0945°N 7.5328°W

The 40ft high external walls that surrounded an internal bastion complete with barracks.

The Rathmullan Battery is a fortification located in Lough Swilly, County Donegal, Republic of Ireland. It earned its name from the nearby village of Rathmullan. The battery is constructed out of granite blocks, and the walls are 40 ft (12 m) high. Despite being such a large fort, the crew was only 30 men. Originally a British fortification, it was constructed in 1810–12, as part of a series of defenses near Lough Swilly made to repulse a French attack, which had happened during the Irish Rebellion of 1798. The battery was of the conventional type of fort for the time, having a surrounding moat and a central bastion. The guns were mounted in five barbettes along the wall, the placements of which can still be seen today. The battery was well kept up until the outbreak of World War I. During the war, Rathmullan protected the British fleet which lay at anchor in the harbour. It also operated as a balloon base during the war. The Rathmullan Battery was abandoned until the 1980s, when the Rathmullan Enterprise Group repaired the building and established a heritage center which opened in 1990.
