= Carrowkeel, County Galway =

Carrowkeel An Cheathrú Chaol
- Townland
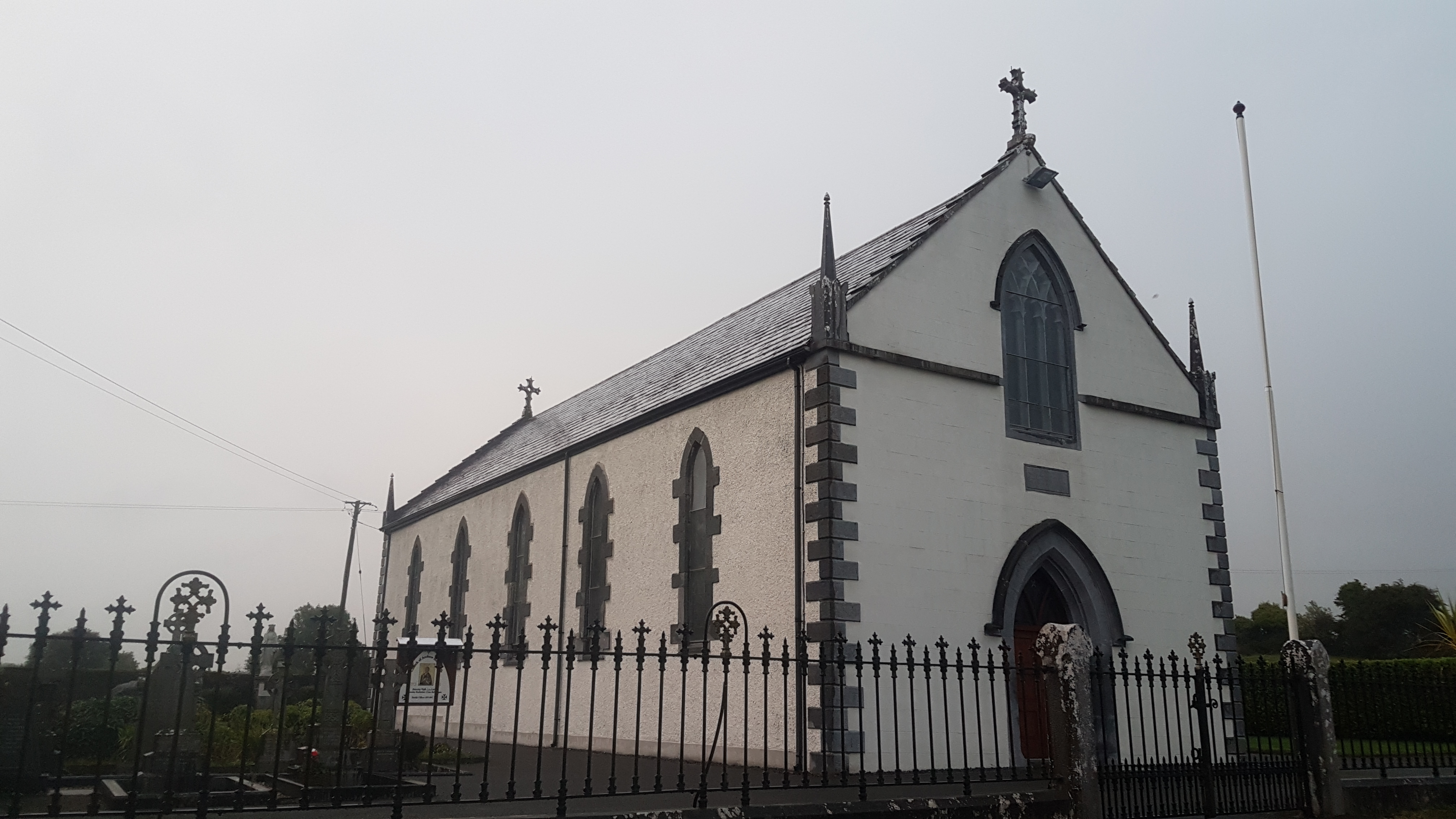
- Leitrim Catholic church, dedicated to St Andrew, is in Carrowkeel townland

- Location in Ireland
- Coordinates: 53°09′54″N 8°28′26″W
- Country: Ireland
- Province: Connacht
- County: County Galway

Area
  - Total: 1.05 km^{2} (0.41 sq mi)
- Time zone: UTC+0 (WET)
  - Summer (DST): UTC-1 (IST (WEST))
- Irish Grid Reference: M683128

Carrowkeel (Irish: An Cheathrú Chaol, meaning 'narrow quarter(land)') is a townland in County Galway, Ireland. It lies in the civil parish of Leitrim and the barony of the same name. As of the 2011 census, the townland of Carrowkeel had a population of 44 people. Leitrim Roman Catholic church, which is dedicated to Saint Andrew and was built in Carrowkeel in 1858, is listed on Galway County Council's Record of Protected Structures.

== See also ==
- List of townlands of County Galway
