= Kilmacrenan (barony) =

Kilmacrenan Cill Mhic Réanáin (Irish)
- Barony
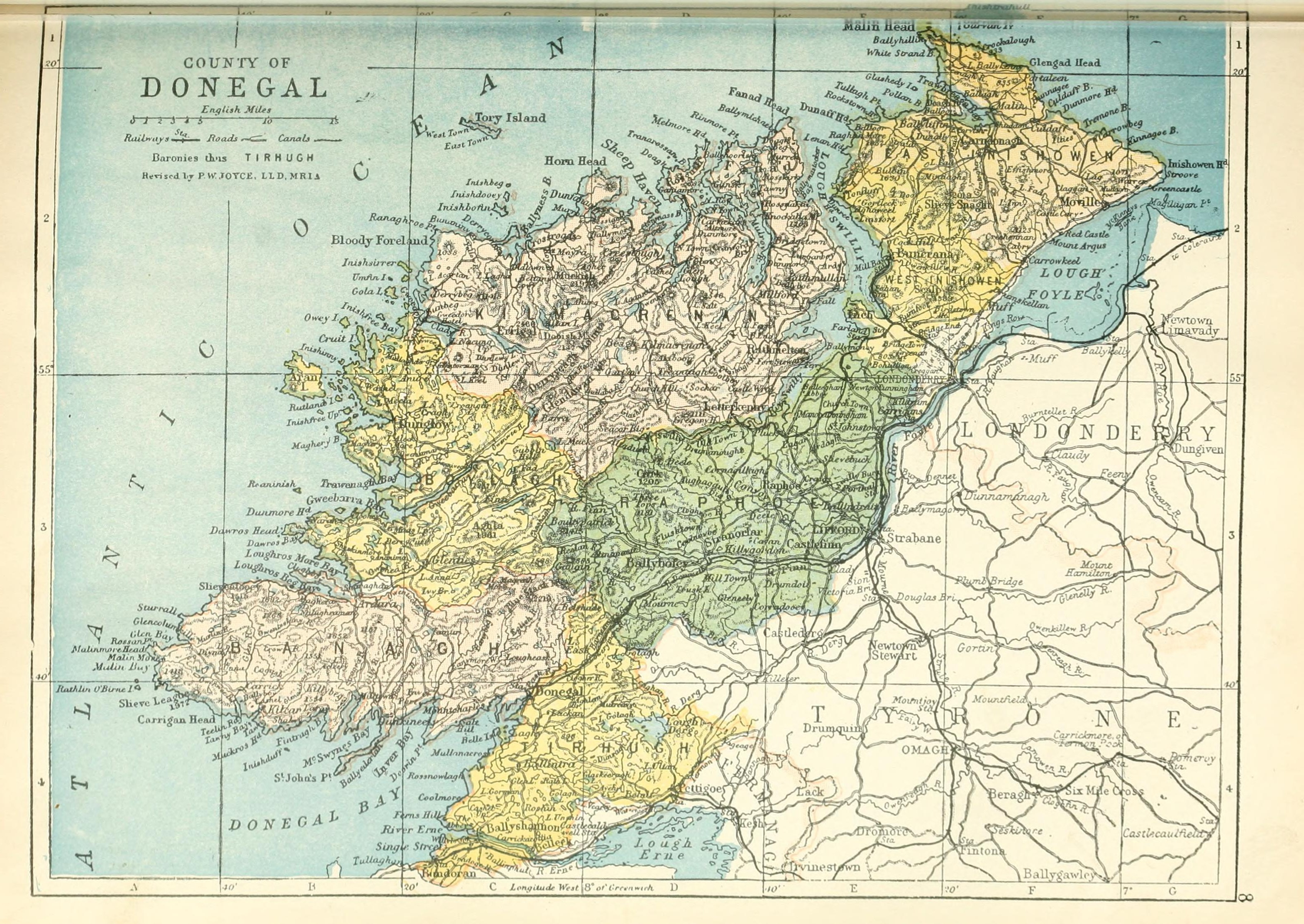
- Barony map of County Donegal, 1900; Kilmacrenan is in the north, coloured peach.

- Location within Ireland
- Coordinates: 55°5′N 7°45′W
- Sovereign state: Republic of Ireland
- Province: Ulster
- County: Donegal

Area
  - Total: 1,264 km^{2} (488 sq mi)

Kilmacrenan (Irish: Cill Mhic Réanáin), sometimes spelled Kilmacrennan, is a barony in County Donegal, Ireland. Baronies were mainly cadastral rather than administrative units, which acquired modest local taxation and spending functions in the 19th century before being superseded by higher units under the Local Government (Ireland) Act 1898. Kilmacrenan is the largest barony in Ireland by land area.

== Etymology ==
Kilmacrenan takes its name from Kilmacrenan village, in Irish Cill Mhic Réanáin or Cill Mhic nÉanáin, "church of the sons of Eanan."

== Geography ==
Kilmacrenan is located in the north of County Donegal, to the west and north of Lough Swilly and the River Swilly. With an area of 312,410 acres, it is the largest barony in Ireland.

== History ==
Kilmacrenan was the ancient territory of the O'Donnell kings of Tyrconnell, O'Breislein (O'Breslin), Mac Sweeneys, O'Begley, O'Friel, O'Kernaghan of Clondavaddog, McCoyle of Mevagh, O'Toner of Tullyfern and O'Laherty (Laverty). Clann Chinnfhaelaidh is in the eastern portion of the barony. The barony of Kilmacrenan was founded by 1672.

== List of settlements ==
Below is a list of settlements in Kilmacrenan barony:

- Bunbeg
- Carrowkeel
- Creeslough
- Derrybeg
- Dunfanaghy
- Falcarragh
- Gortahork
- Kilmacrenan
- Letterkenny
- Meenlaragh
- Milford
- Rathmelton
- Rathmullan
- Tory Island
