= Royal Sea Bathing Hospital =

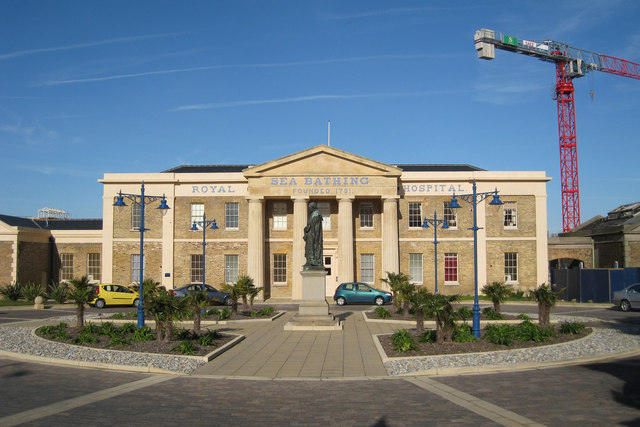
- Main façade of the Royal Sea Bathing Hospital in Margate, Kent, UK

- Location within the United Kingdom

General information
- Coordinates: 051.384780°N 0001.366349°E
- Opened: 1791

Design and construction
- Architect: Revd. John Pridden

Listed Building – Grade II
- Official name: Royal Sea Bathing Hospital
- Designated: 22 February 1973
- Reference no.: 1088987

Listed Building – Grade II
- Official name: Chapel of Royal Sea Bathing Hospital
- Designated: 23 October 1990
- Reference no.: 1241852

Listed Building – Grade II
- Official name: Royal Sea Bathing Hospital Mortuary
- Designated: 9 December 1998
- Reference no.: 1033363

Listed Building – Grade II
- Official name: Statue of Erasmus Wilson to South of Royal Sea Bathing Hospital
- Designated: 23 October 1990
- Reference no.: 1260303

The Royal Sea Bathing Hospital in Margate, Kent, England, was founded in 1791 by Dr John Coakley Lettsom, a Quaker physician and philanthropist, for the treatment of scrofula.

The hospital was one of the earliest—if not the earliest—specialist orthopaedic hospital in the UK, and pioneered the use of open-air treatment for patients with non-pulmonary tuberculosis. Patients received a variety of treatments, with a central focus on providing patients with the supposed clinical benefits of sunshine, fresh air and sea bathing.

== History ==
The organisation was founded in 1791 to treat poor suffers from scrofula in London. The original hospital was built between 1793 and 1796. The treatment was based on fresh air and bathing so from the start it was provided with verandas. Bathing was done from a bathing machine in the sea. At first the hospital was only opened during the summer months but in 1858 an indoor pool was added to allow bathing year round. When possible beds were on the verandah and patients slept there. Only in inclement weather were the beds brought indoors. The hospital was enlarged around 1880 following the donation of £30,000 (equivalent to £3,120,266 in 2025) (Note: UK Consumer Price Index inflation figures from 1209–2024 based on data from "Inflation calculator". Bank of England. London. February 18, 2026.) by Sir Erasmus Wilson who was a director of the hospital and President of the Royal College of Surgeons. The enlargement included the Knowles ward, a heated indoor salt-water pool and the hospital's chapel. The Knowles ward had a flat roof that was used as a promenade by patients.

The hospital continued treating tuberculosis until the 1950s. Better living conditions, preventative medicine and more modern treatments led to the hospital ceasing to treat TB patients in the early 1950s. The whole complex has been turned into apartments.

== Architecture ==
The original building was of yellow brick with stone dressings. The original block remains, but heavily altered, and is the basis of the eastern arm of the quadrangle. In 1816 the southern wing was added and in 1820 the northern two-storey wing. Around 1853 the buildings were raised to two stories and a monumental Greek portico added to the front of the original building. At the end of these wings were the wards for children. The Knowles extensions of 1880 completed the square forming an internal quadrangle. The entrance portico was now internal, so was moved to the south wing to form the current main entrance.

== Associated buildings ==
There are two other buildings and a statue within the complex considered notable enough to warrant listing by the statutory body, Historic England.

=== Chapel ===
The chapel was built 1882–3 by James Knowles as part of Wilson's expansion. It is now a grade II listed building. It is of red brick with contrasting detailing and stone dressings on the buttresses. In plan there is a nave of six bays, a single bay chancel and an apsidal east end. The west end has a five light window. There is a small tower to the north west and a porch to the south.

The stained glass is by Clayton and Bell and according to English Heritage "a very fine series ... depicting miracles and healing plants". At the west end there is an octagonal font and a wall painting depicting Naaman at the door of the prophet Elisha. The organ is by Henry Willis ("Father" Willis) and has stencilled pipes to the front.

=== Mortuary ===
The mortuary is from the 1880 expansion and is probably by James Knowles. It is a single story red brick building with stone dressings and parapet. The entrance has an ogee hood moulding in stone with a lancet window above.

=== Statue of Erasmus Wilson ===
Erasmus Wilson was the donor who paid for the chapel and the 1883 extensions. He is depicted in an academic gown. The statue is in bronze mounted on a granite plinth forming the centrepiece of the hospital's front garden.

== Citations ==
- Historic England. "Royal Sea Bathing Hospital (Grade II) (1088987)". National Heritage List for England.
- —. "Chapel of Royal Sea Bathing Hospital (Grade II) (1241852)". National Heritage List for England.
- —. "Royal Sea Bathing Hospital Mortuary (Grade II) (1033363)". National Heritage List for England.
- —. "Statue of Erasmus Wilson to South of Royal Sea Bathing Hospital (Grade II) (1260303)". National Heritage List for England.
- Richardson, Harriet (27 December 2017), "Margate's Sea Bathing Hospital", Historic Hospitals
