= Downings =

Gaeltacht village in County Donegal, Ireland

Na Dúnaibh Downings, Downies, The Downies
- Village
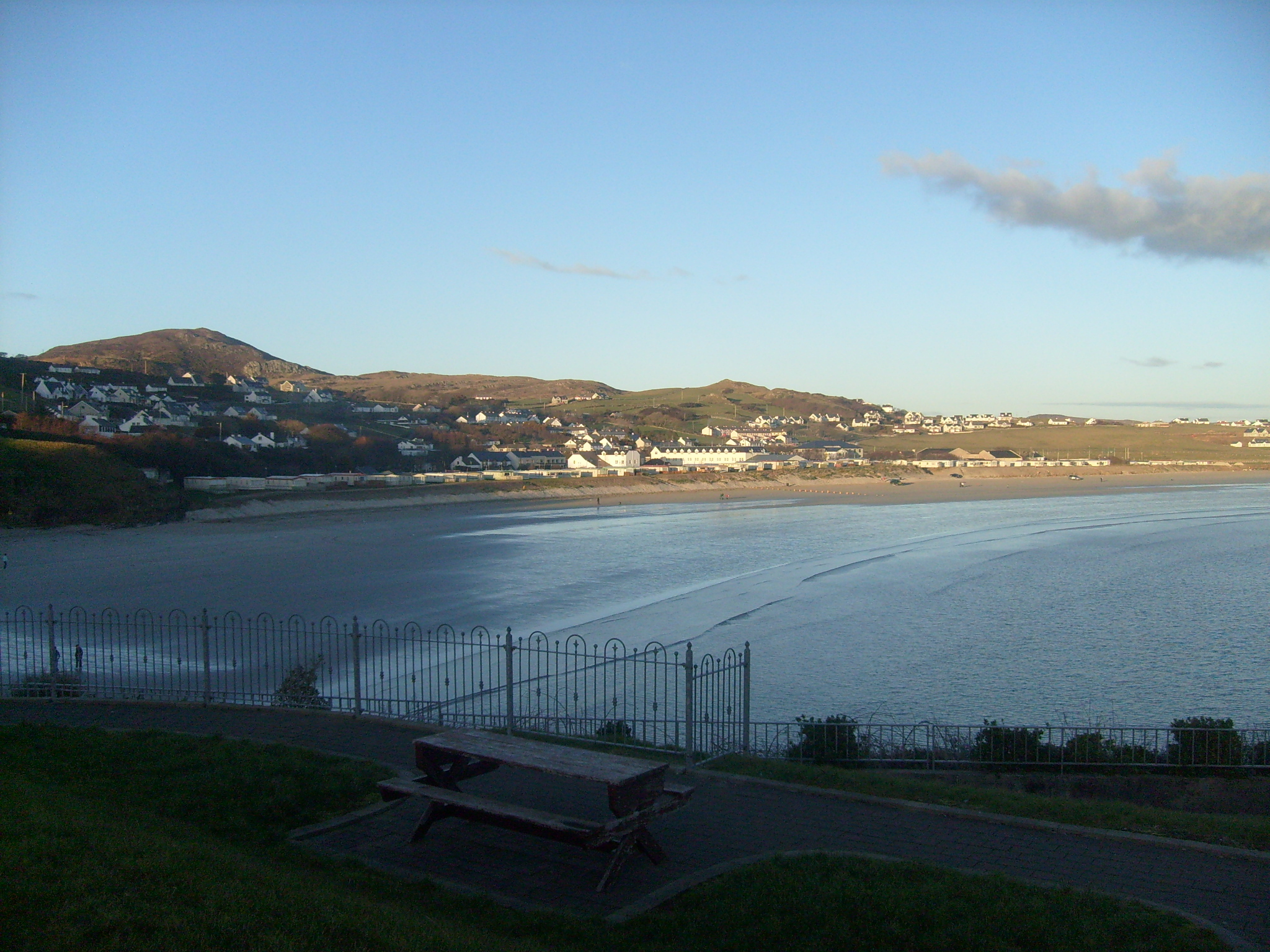
- Downings Bay

- Location in Ireland
- Coordinates: 55°11′40″N 7°50′11″W
- Country: Ireland
- Province: Ulster
- County: County Donegal
- Barony: Kilmacrenan
- Time zone: UTC+0 (WET)
  - Summer (DST): UTC-1 (IST (WEST))
- Irish Grid Reference: B847228

Na Dúnaibh, known in English as Downings or Downies, is a Gaeltacht village and townland on the Rosguill peninsula in County Donegal, Ireland. The village is on the shores of Sheephaven Bay on the north coast of Ireland.

== Name ==
As the village is in a Gaeltacht district, its official name is Na Dúnaibh, its name in the Irish language. The name probably means 'the forts', reflecting the existence of several hill forts in the area. The full original Irish name seems to have been (hi ccrannóicc) na nDuini. The name may also be a hibernicisation of the English name, to describe the sandy dunes connecting the peninsula to the County Donegal mainland.

== History ==
Evidence of ancient settlement in the area includes a number of ringfort and standing stone sites in the townlands of Larganreagh (Leargain Riach), Downies (Na Dúnaibh) and Rosepenna (Machaire Loiscthe).

In 2007, local divers recovered a gun from the wreck of HMS Laurentic at the mouth of Lough Swilly. The gun is now mounted beside Downings Pier.

== Economy ==
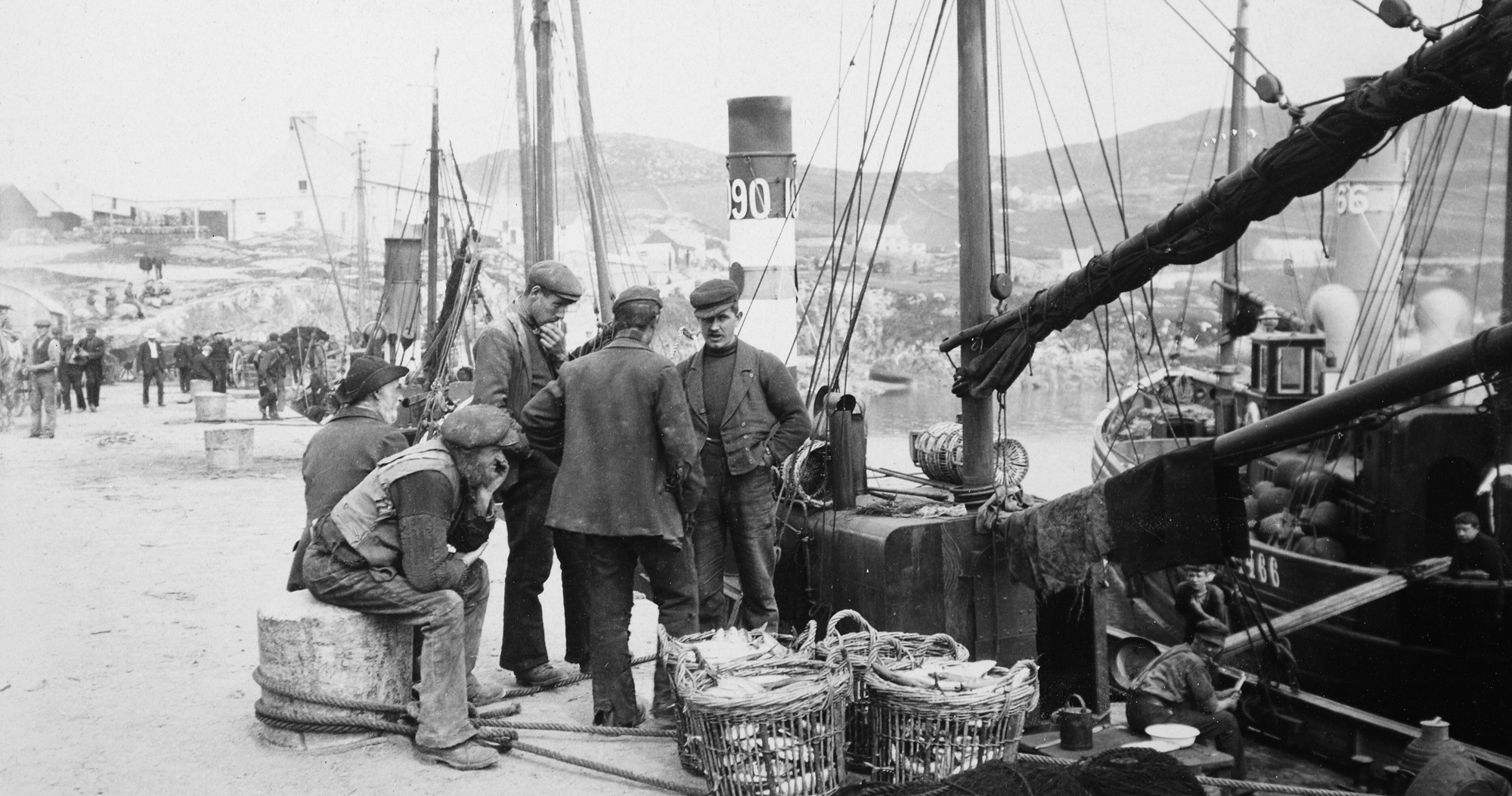
Fishermen on Downings pier, around 1910

The fishing port at Downings was previously home to a substantial herring fleet. Today, the economy survives partly on tourism. Downings is home to the 'McNutt of Donegal' tweed factory and shop. It is also home to McBride Fishing, who operate three crab fishing boats and the online fishing industry news platform The Fishing Daily. The Meevagh Boatyard, located on Mulroy Bay, was established in the early 1900s by the Congested Districts Board (CDB). It built fishing boats, for local fishermen, during the herring boom.

== Recreation ==
The Rosapenna Hotel & Golf Resort, just outside Downings village, is located on the dunes that link the Rosguill peninsula to the mainland. The golf club's links course was initially designed by Old Tom Morris in the 1890s.

Downings lies on the Donegal Atlantic Drive tourist driving route.

== People ==
- Philip Boyce, Lord Bishop of Raphoe from 1995 to 2017.
- Maxi Curran, Gaelic football manager

== See also ==
- List of towns and villages in Ireland
