= Carrigart =

Gaeltacht village in County Donegal, Ireland

Carraig Airt Carrigart
- Village
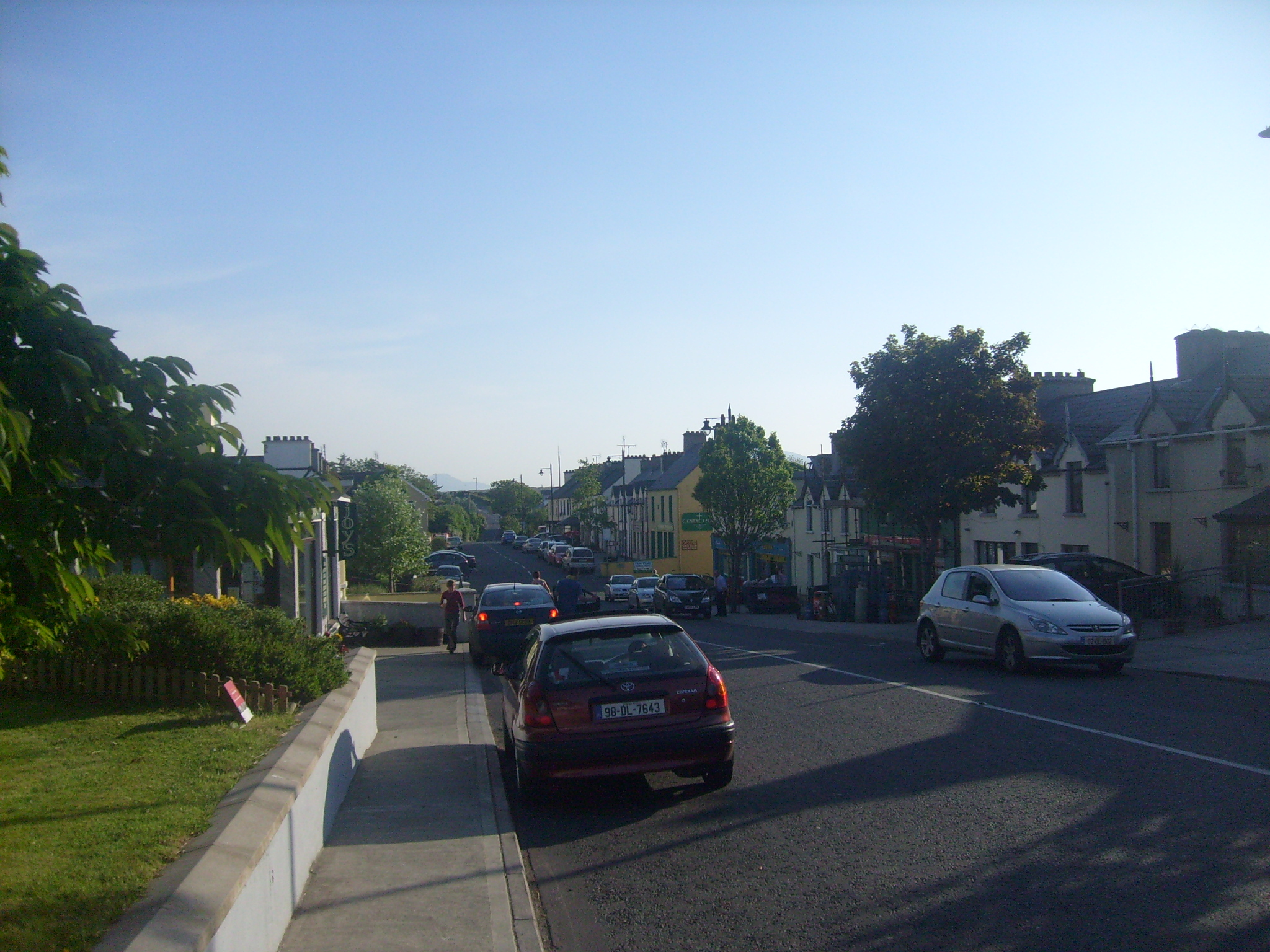
- Carrigart Main Street

- Location in Ireland
- Coordinates: 55°10′37″N 7°47′38″W
- Country: Ireland
- Province: Ulster
- County: County Donegal
- Barony: Kilmacrenan

Population (2022)
  - Total: 294
- Area code: 074, +00 353 74
- Irish Grid Reference: B847228
- Carraig Airt is the only official name. The anglicised spelling Carrigart has no official status.

Carraig Airt (anglicised as Carrigart or Carrickart) is a small Gaeltacht village in the barony of Kilmacrenan in the north of County Donegal, Ireland. The village is on the R245 route between Letterkenny and Creeslough. The Loughnambraddan Burn flows through the village and empties into Mulroy Bay at Carrigart.

Situated as it is at the base of the Rosguill peninsula, in one of the more remote but most scenic parts of the country, the village provides services for a large hinterland, with a supermarket with banking facilities, a post office, a doctor's surgery and a barracks staffed part-time by the Garda Síochána. Carrigart has a public park that borders the shoreline behind the houses on the main street. Designed by Angela Gallagher, it is maintained by the Tidy Towns Committee and has won several awards. The village and its environs remain largely agricultural, relying on passing trade and tourism during the summer months. In common with the rest of this part of Donegal, Carrigart has many second homes, owned especially by Northern Irish holiday makers.

The village, which celebrated its centenary in 2002, although there is evidence of Carrigart's existence for longer than that, originally formed part of the estates of the Earls of Leitrim, nearby Mulroy House being one of their seats. The 3rd Earl of Leitrim was assassinated in nearby Cratlagh Wood in 1878 by men from the neighbouring peninsula of Fanad.

In the 18th and 19th centuries, Carrigart had a fair day on 21 June. The town now hosts a festival that runs from 8 to 14 August.

The official name given to Carrigart is Carraig Airt but it has also been translated as Ceathrú Fhiodhghoirt, meaning Quarterland of the Wood of the Field

== See also ==
- List of populated places in Ireland
