= River Lennon =

Coordinates: 52.228373°N 9.328336°W

River Leannan Leannan River
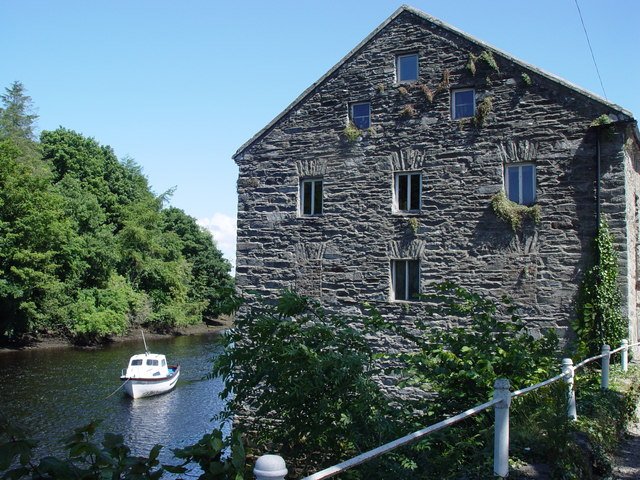
- The "Fish House", Ramelton, with the River Lennon passing it
- Native name: An Leanainn (Irish)

Location
- Country: Ireland
- Cities: Kilmacrennan, Ramelton

Physical characteristics
- Source
  - location: Glendowan Mountains
- Mouth
  - location: Atlantic Ocean via Lough Swilly at Ramelton
- Length: 45.9 km (28.5 mi)
- Basin size: 262 km^{2} (101 sq mi)
- Discharge
  - average: 21.3 m^{3}/s (750 cu ft/s)
  - maximum: 41.79 m^{3}/s (1,476 cu ft/s)

The River Lennon or Leannan (Irish: An Leanainn) is a river in County Donegal, Ireland.

== Course ==
The River Lennon rises in the Glendowan Mountains and flows through Gartan Lough and Lough Fern. It continues through Kilmacrennan and enters Lough Swilly at Ramelton.

== Wildlife ==
The River Lennon is a noted brown trout fishery. Salmon numbers are recovering after a UDN outbreak in the 1970's. Other species found in the river (a Special Area of Conservation) include the freshwater pearl mussel, European otter and slender naiad.

== See also ==
- Rivers of Ireland
