= Rathmullan =

Seaside village in County Donegal, Ireland

Rathmullan Ráth Maoláin
- Village
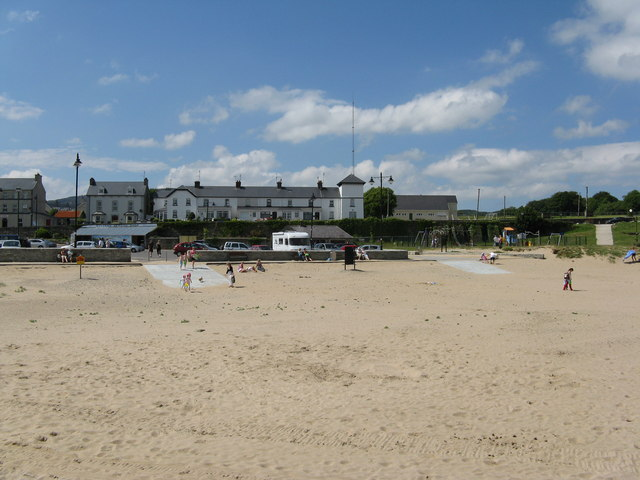
- Rathmullan Beach

- Location in Ireland
- Coordinates: 55°05′39″N 07°32′15″W
- Country: Ireland
- Province: Ulster
- County: County Donegal

Government
  - Dáil constituency: Donegal

Population (2022)
  - Total: 528
- Time zone: UTC+0 (WET)
  - Summer (DST): UTC-1 (IST (WEST))
- Irish Grid Reference: C295275

Rathmullan (Irish: Ráth Maoláin, meaning 'Maolán's ringfort') is a seaside village and townland on the Fanad Peninsula in County Donegal, Ireland. It is situated on the western shore of Lough Swilly, 11 kilometres (7 mi) north-east of Ramelton and 12 km (7 mi) east of Milford. Rathmullan was the point of departure during the Flight of the Earls in 1607, a major turning point in Irish history.

== History ==
Evidence of ancient settlement in the area includes court tomb and ringfort sites in the neighbouring townlands of Crevary Upper and Rathmullan and Ballyboe.

Within Rathmullan village is a ruined Carmelite friary, dating to 1516, which was built by Eoghan Rua MacSweeney. The friary was sacked by the English garrison from Sligo in 1595. In 1617, the friary was occupied by the Protestant Bishop of Raphoe, Andrew Knox. A subsequent Bishop of Raphoe turned it into a fortified house in anticipation of a possible French invasion during the Napoleonic Wars.

On 14 September 1607, 99 aristocrats of the Gaelic Order, including of Clan Ó Néill and Clan Ó Domhnaill, left Rathmullan for the European continent, an episode known as the Flight of the Earls. On 14 September 2007, president Mary McAleese visited the village to mark the 400th anniversary of the event. She unveiled a sculpture by John Behan that represents the plight of the men who were led by the Gaelic aristocrats.

There are the remains of a Martello tower or battery commonly called the Rathmullan Battery which serves as a heritage centre. The fortification was one of six originally built c. 1813 by the British as part of a defence along Lough Swilly against feared Napoleonic invasion. These batteries were manned up until the end of the World War I to protect British warships that were moored in Lough Swilly.

== Amenities ==
There are three churches in Rathmullan: St. Joseph's Catholic Church, St. Columb's Church of Ireland (Parish of Killygarvan), and the Rathmullan Presbyterian Church.

Other facilities in Rathmullan include shops, a resource centre, a spa, a wedding venue (Drumhalla House), and a hotel.

== Events ==
The annual Lough Swilly Deep Sea Fishing Festival is held locally in June. The 2007 festival took place on Saturday 2 June and Sunday 3 June.

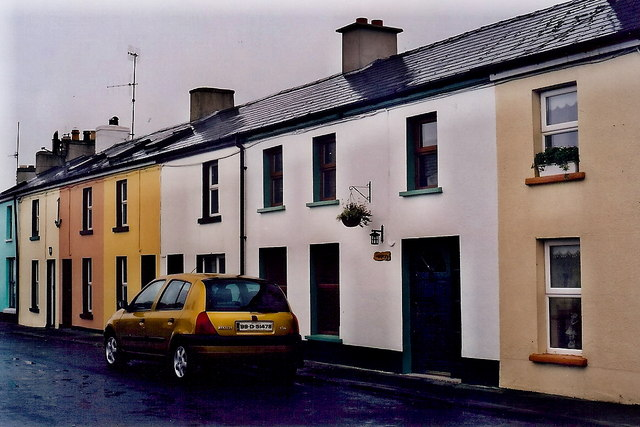
Houses on Rathmullan's main street

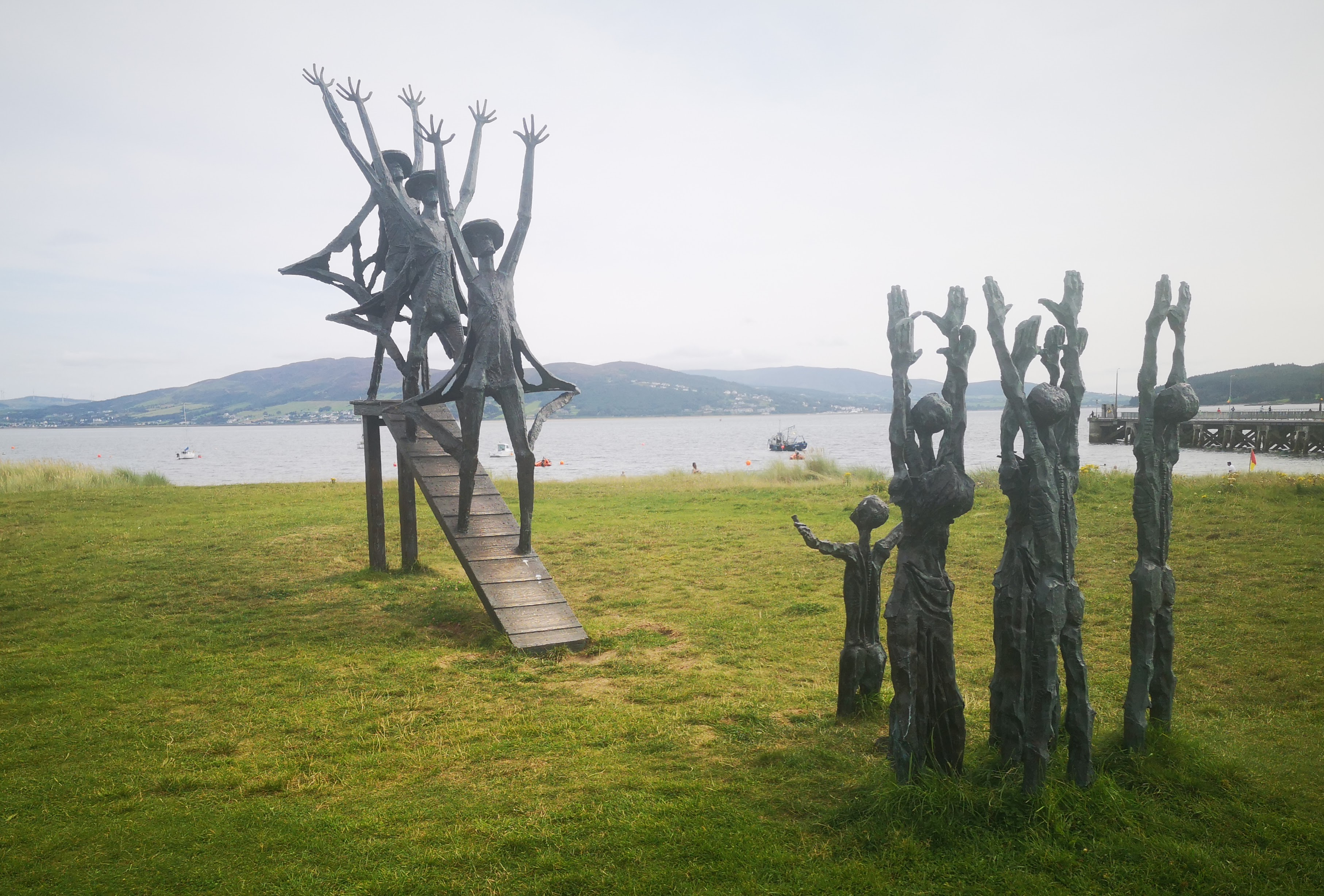
A statue commemorating the Flight of the Earls

== Literature ==
Rathmullan is the setting for Australian/British author Brand King's novel An Irish Winter, published in 2020. A number of features of the village are described in the novel, including the local beach. The traditional New Year's Day cold water swim also features, while a number of scenes are set in the Beachcomber Bar and An Bonnan Bui Cafe.

== Notable people ==
- Ian Anderson (1925–2005), former President of the Legislative Council of the Isle of Man.
- Hugh Law (1818–1883), Lord Chancellor of Ireland, died here in 1883.
- Mary McAlister (1896–1976), Irish-born Scottish nurse who became an MP for the UK Labour Party.
- Oisin Orr (born 1997), jockey.

== See also ==
- List of abbeys and priories in Ireland (County Donegal)
- List of towns and villages in the Republic of Ireland
- List of abbeys and priories in the Republic of Ireland
