= Kerrykeel =

Village in County Donegal, Ireland

Kerrykeel An Cheathrú Chaol
- Village
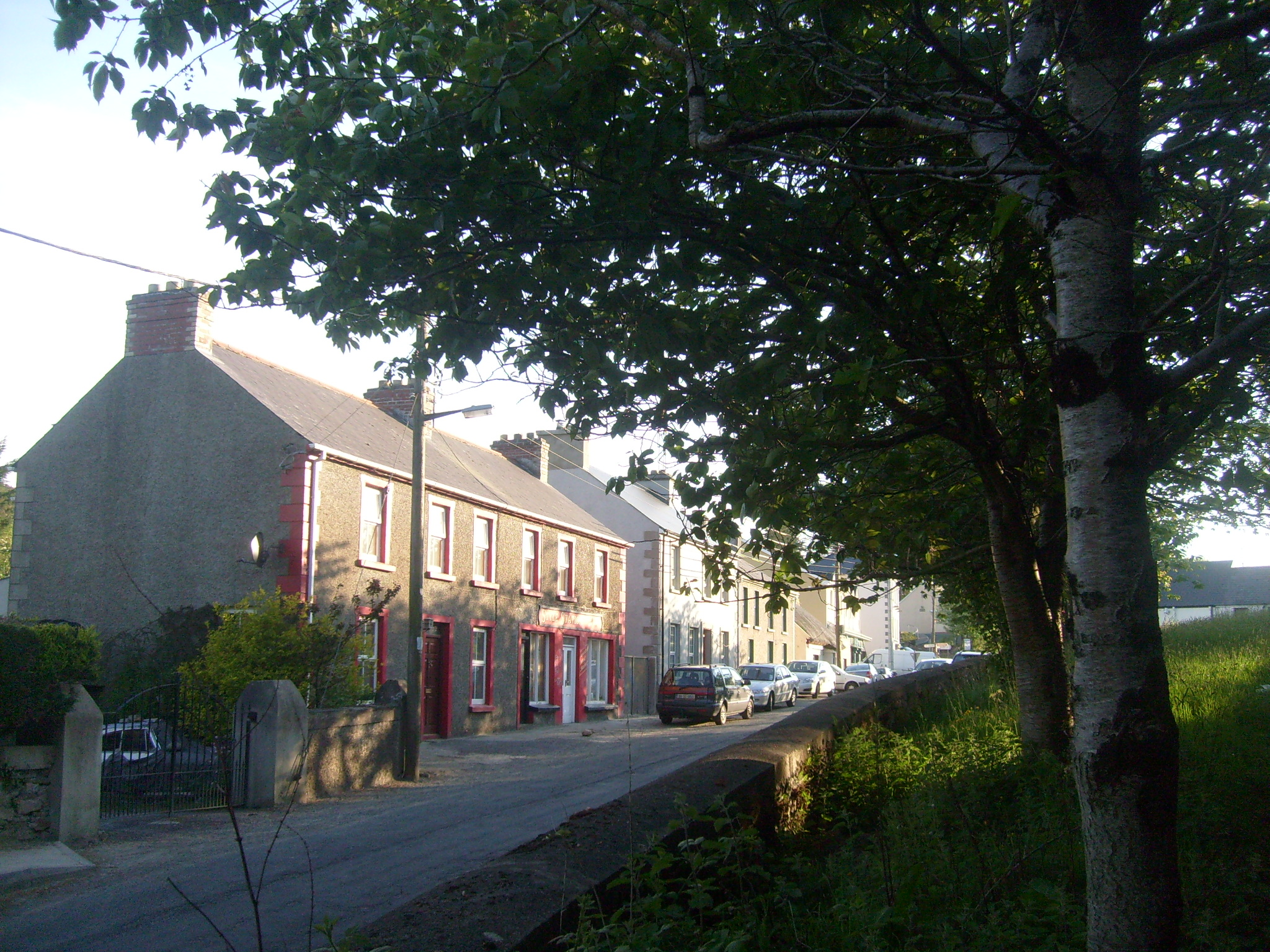
- The R247 passes through Kerrykeel

- Location in Ireland
- Coordinates: 55°08′19″N 7°39′46″W
- Country: Ireland
- Province: Ulster
- County: County Donegal

Government
  - Dáil Éireann: Donegal

Population (2022)
  - Total: 389
- Area code: 074, +353 74
- Irish Grid Reference: B847228

Kerrykeel (Irish: An Cheathrú Chaol, meaning 'the narrow quarter'; historically and in census returns Carrowkeel) is a small village in County Donegal, Ireland. It lies between Knockalla Mountain and Ranny Hill and is on the shores of Mulroy Bay. Kerrykeel is accessible via the R245 and R247 roads which converge in the centre of the village. Kerrykeel is also in close to the tourist area of Portsalon.

== Amenities ==
Amenities include Scoil Colmcille primary school, a Garda station, Roman Catholic and Presbyterian churches, a post office, a number of pubs and restaurants, a community centre and several retail businesses.

The Kerrykeel Country Market took place on Saturday mornings until 2020. During the summer period, Kerrykeel sees an increase of tourists, with some staying in holiday rental homes in the area.

A 'Tidy Towns' committee aims to improve the overall look of the village. This committee's efforts have included the addition of seasonal flower beds, green areas along the roads leading into the village and improvements to the pier and lay-by along the Milford to Kerrykeel road.

In 2013, Kerrykeel was mistakenly named the 'crime capital of Ireland' after a computer glitch at the Central Statistics Office. With a population of approximately 400 people, Kerrykeel was said to have an increase in sexual assaults, burglaries and theft. Later the CSO stated that Kerrykeel was mixed up with Kevin Street. The error was later rectified.

== Gallery ==
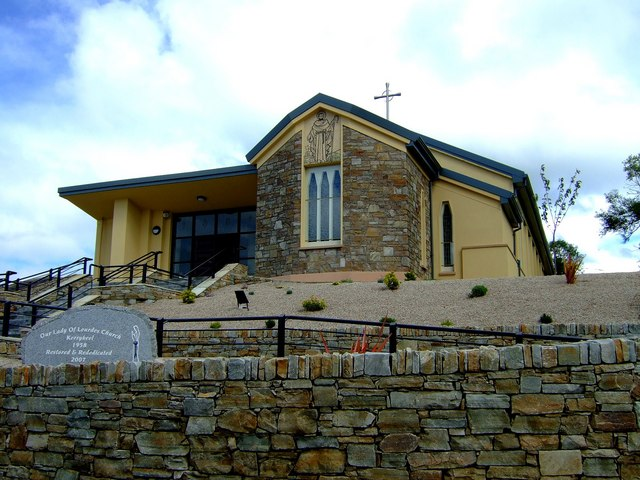
Our Lady of Lourdes Roman Catholic church

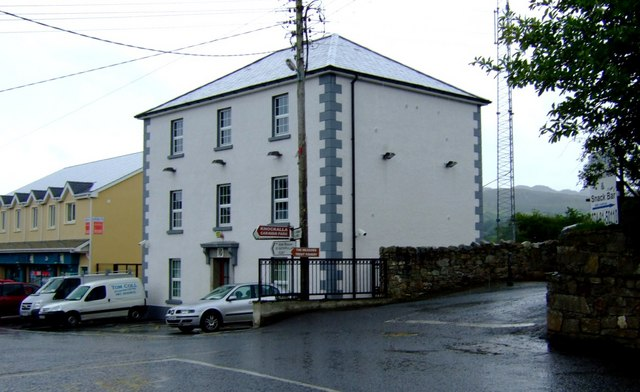
Kerrykeel Garda station

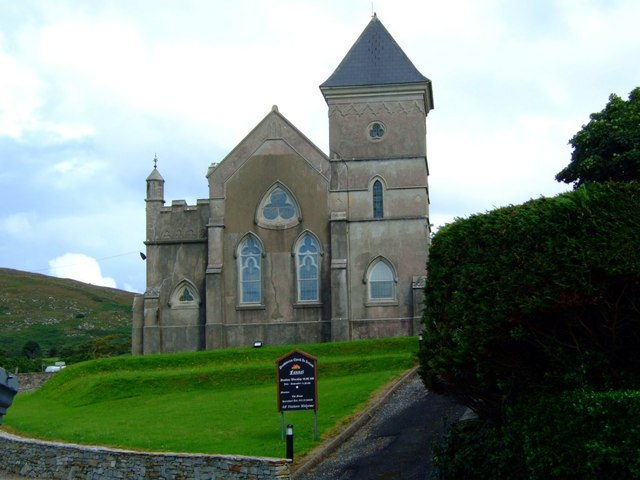
The Presbyterian Church in Kerrykeel

== Notable people ==
- Billy Gillespie, footballer, born Kerrykeel
- John Kerr, ballad singer

== See also ==
- List of towns and villages in Ireland
