= Portsalon =

Portsalon Port an tSalainn
- Village
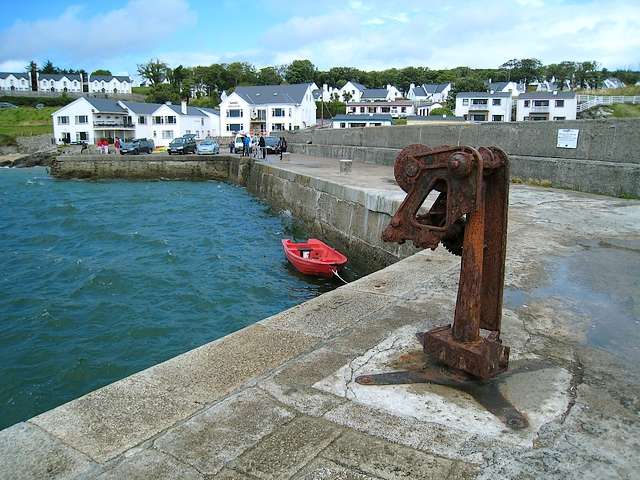

- Location in Ireland
- Coordinates: 55°12′00″N 7°37′01″W
- Country: Ireland
- Province: Ulster
- County: County Donegal

Government
  - Dáil Éireann: Donegal
- Time zone: UTC+0 (WET)
  - Summer (DST): UTC-1 (IST (WEST))
- Area codes: 075, +000 353 74
- Irish Grid Reference: B847228

Portsalon (Irish: Port an tSalainn) is a seaside village in County Donegal, Ireland. It is situated on Lough Swilly and it is known for its beach, which was deemed to be the second most beautiful beach in the world by The Observer newspaper.

Up until the second half of the 20th century, there was very little in the area. Now it is a tourist resort and many visitors have built holiday homes around Portsalon.

== Recent times ==
September 2019, Donegal County Council took action to tackle flooding problems at Portsalon.
