= Milford, County Donegal =

Town in County Donegal, Ireland

Milford Baile na nGallóglach
- Town
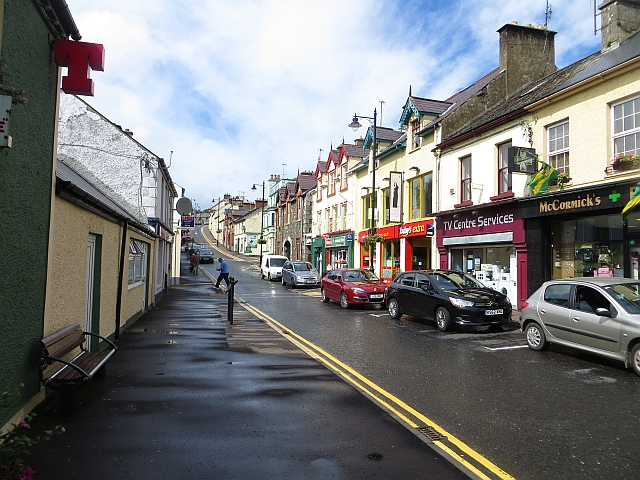

- Location in Ireland
- Coordinates: 55°05′16″N 7°41′55″W
- Country: Ireland
- Province: Ulster
- County: County Donegal

Government
  - Dáil constituency: Donegal
- Elevation: 68 m (223 ft)

Population (2022)
  - Total: 1,076
- Time zone: UTC+0 (WET)
  - Summer (DST): UTC-1 (IST (WEST))
- Area code: 075, +000 353 74
- Irish Grid Reference: C188267

Milford or Millford, historically called Ballynagalloglagh (from Irish Baile na nGallóglach), is a small town and townland in County Donegal, Ireland. It stands near the head of Mulroy Bay. The population at the 2022 census was 1,076.

The Tirconaill Tribune is headquartered here.

== History and name ==
Located north of Letterkenny, the town was founded in the 18th century by the Clement family. It was named after a mill that was located on Maggie's Burn on the edge of the town.

The Irish Baile na nGallóglach means "town of the gallóglach". The gallóglaigh (anglicised 'gallowglass') were an elite class of mercenary warrior who came from Gaelic-Norse clans in Scotland between the mid-13th century and late 16th century. A battle between the Irish (helped by gallowglass) and the English took place on a hill in the townland and this is where the name comes from.

== Amenities ==
The town once had two major employers: the Milford Bakery and Flour Mills and McMahons garage, but both are now long gone. There are now a post office, four supermarkets, a veterinary practice, three pubs, a health centre, a library with council offices, a fire station and fishing lakes.

The Gallowglass Community Centre was donated to the community and has been functioning since September 2023 as a venue for community events and classes.

There are four nearby beaches: Portsalon, Rathmullan, Downings, and Tramore. It is a feeder town to Letterkenny.

=== Education ===
There are a National School, Scoil Mhuire Milford; two secondary schools, Loreto Community School and Mulroy College; and an Adult Education Education and Training Board centre.

== Administration ==
The Milford electoral area has 3 seats. In 2024 the following were elected to Donegal County Council.

- Declan Meehan (Independent)
- Pauric McGarvey (Independent)
- Liam Blaney (Fianna Fáil)

== People ==
- Amber Barrett (born 1996) - Footballer, born in Milford
- Sean Ferriter (born 1938) - Gaelic footballer, born in Milford
- Patsy Gallacher (1891-1953) - association footballer, born in Milford
- The Baron Hay of Ballyore (born 1950) - DUP politician based in Derry who previously served as the Speaker of the Northern Ireland Assembly; born in Milford

== Gallery ==
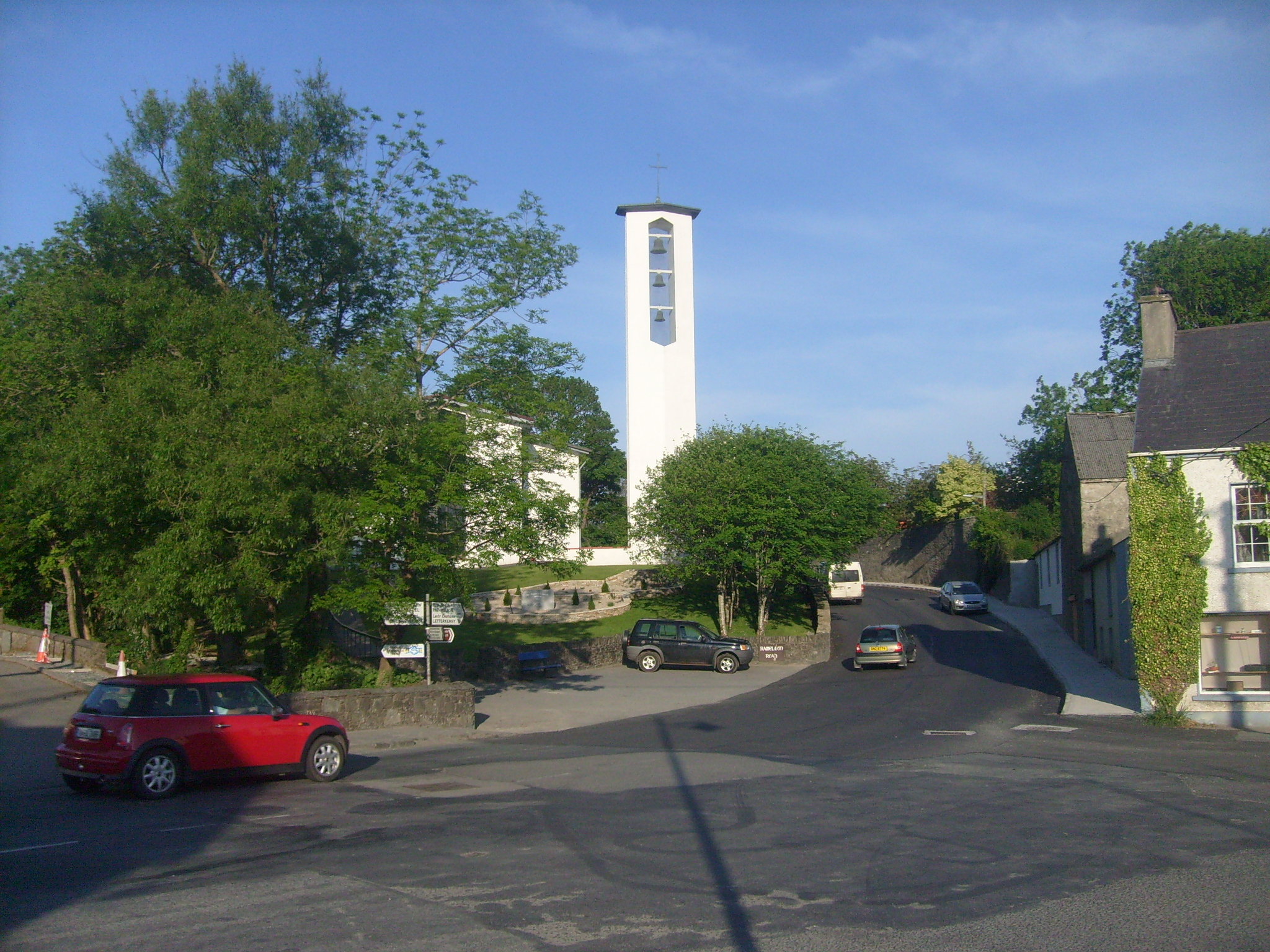
St. Peter's Church, usually known locally as 'the Chapel', the local Catholic place of worship.

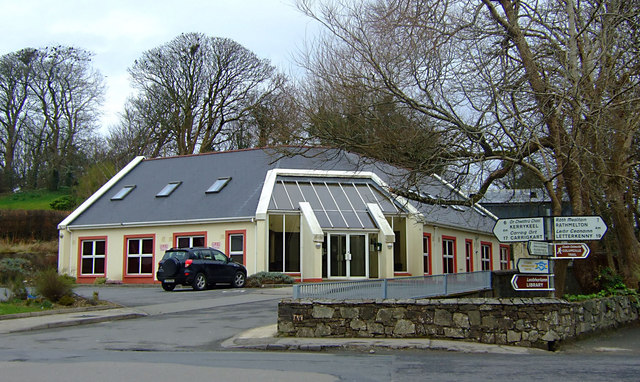
Milford Health Centre

== See also ==
- List of populated places in the Republic of Ireland
