= Mulroy Bay =

Sea loch in County Donegal, Ireland

Coordinates: 55°09′N 7°41′W

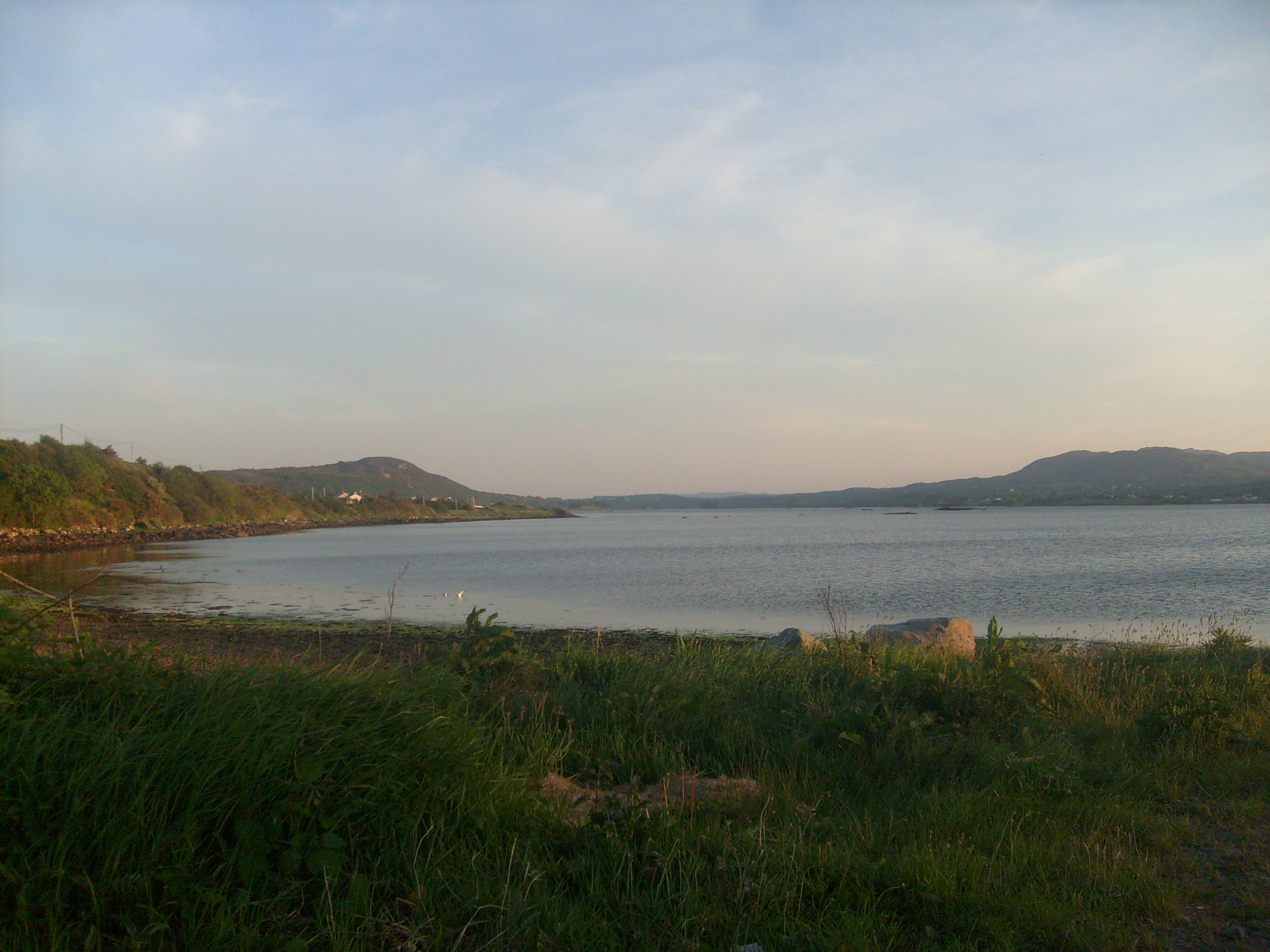
Mulroy Bay, County Donegal

Mulroy Bay (Irish: Cuan na Maoil Ruaidh) is a sea loch on the north coast of County Donegal, Ireland.

Mulroy Bay is the most convoluted of the marine inlets in north-west Ireland. It is approximately 12 km long in a north-south direction. The entrance to the bay is a narrow embayment leading to a winding entrance channel 10 km in length. This channel varies in width and depth, with three significant narrows only 100–150 m across, where the current reaches maxima of 3-5 knots. It opens into the Broad Water, an open shallow sea lough 8 km from north to south and 2.5 km from east to west, generally less than 20 m in depth and with many small rocky islands and islets.

Settlements founded on the bay include Milford, Kerrykeel and Cranford.

The English name of the bay comes from Cuan na Mhaoil Ruaidh, the original Irish language name for the bay which means 'Bay of the Red Current' or 'Bay of the Red Stream'.
