= 25th Anniversary Celebration =

- Cover to the standard edition of the album

Studio album by Altan
- Released: 31 January 2010
- Recorded: May 2009
- Studio: RTÉ studios, Dublin, Ireland
- Genre: Studio; Celtic; Irish traditional
- Length: 56:33
- Label: Compass Records (US); Plankton (JP)
- Director: David Brophy

Altan chronology
Local Ground (2005)	25th Anniversary Celebration (2010)	Gleann Nimhe – The Poison Glen (2012)

Japanese cover

25th Anniversary Celebration (released in Japan as Altan: With the RTÉ Concert Orchestra) is the tenth studio album by Irish folk music group Altan. It was released in January–March 2010. The album does not contain new original material (except for one new song, "Soilse na Nollag") for it is a compilation of studio re-recordings of previous material with orchestral arrangements.

== Overview ==
25th Anniversary Celebration was recorded in the RTÉ studios, Dublin, Ireland with the contribution of the RTÉ Concert Orchestra.

It was made to commemorate Altan's 25th anniversary and features new arrangements of some of Altan's best-known songs and tunes.

The album was released on 31 January 2010 in Japan (where it had its launch in December 2009 during Altan's Winter 2009 Japanese tour) and on 2 March 2010 in North America.

== Track listing ==
1. "Is the Big Man Within? / Tilly Finn's Reel" 3.52 (from Local Ground (2005))
2. "Cití na gCumann" 4.04 (from Altan (1987))
3. "The Roseville" 2.20 [comp. D. Sproule. Arr. Altan] (from Local Ground (2005))
4. "I Wish My Love was a Red Red Rose" 3.44 (from Runaway Sunday (1997))
5. "Dónal agus Mórag" 4.28 (Additional lyrics; Proinsias Ó Maonaigh) (from Harvest Storm (1992))
6. "Mo Ghaoil" 4.19 (Additional lyrics; Proinsias Ó Maonaigh) (from Harvest Storm (1992))
7. "Bog an Lochain / The Margaree Reel / The Humours of Westport" 3.34 (from Harvest Storm (1992))
8. "A Tune for Frankie" 3.24 [comp. Mairéad Ní Mhaonaigh] (from Blackwater (1996))
9. "Molly na gCuach Ní Chuilleannáin" 2.39 (from Blackwater (1996))
10. "Soilse na Nollag" 5.17 [brand new song comp. Proinsias Ó Maonaigh/Mairéad Ní Mhaonaigh]
11. "As I Roved Out" 4.02 (from Local Ground (2005))
12. "The Sunset" 3.47 [comp. Cathal McConnell and Seamus Quinn] (from Altan (1987))
13. "Gleanntáin Ghlas Ghaoth Dobhair" 3.37 (lyrics: Proinsias Ó Maonaigh) (from Runaway Sunday (1997))
14. "Comb Your Hair and Curl It/Gweebarra Bridge" 3.54 (from The Blue Idol (2002))
15. "Dún Do Shúil" 3.32 (from Local Ground (2005))

All tracks: Trad. Arr. Altan except as indicated or added.
All tracks: Orchestral Arr. Fiachra Trench.
The late Proinsias Ó Maonaigh (Francie Mooney) was Mairéad Ní Mhaonaigh's father.

== Personnel ==
=== Altan ===
- Mairéad Ní Mhaonaigh – Fiddle, Vocals
- Ciarán Tourish – Fiddle, Whistles, Backing vocals
- Dermot Byrne – Accordion
- Ciarán Curran – Bouzouki
- Mark Kelly – Guitar, Backing Vocals

=== Guest musicians ===
- David Brophy – Vibes on "Soilse na Nollag"
- The RTÉ Concert Orchestra conducted by David Brophy

== Release history ==
Country	Release date	Record label
Japan	31 January 2010	Plankton
Ireland	19 February 2010	IRL
UK	22 February 2010	Compass Records
Canada & United States	2 March 2010	Compass Records
