= Paul O'Shaughnessy (musician) =

Irish musician (born 1961)

- Born: 9 June 1961 (age 65); Dublin, Ireland
- Genres: Irish traditional; folk; world
- Occupation: Musician
- Instruments: Fiddle, whistle, flute
- Years active: Late 1970s – present
- Labels: Claddagh, Faetain Records, own label
- Website: pauloshaughnessy.wordpress.com

Paul O'Shaughnessy (born 9 June 1961) is an Irish fiddler, former member of Irish folk music bands Altan and Beginish. Also a whistle and flute player and an occasional composer, Paul has been playing fiddle since his childhood, and has long been recognised as a leading traditional musician in the city of Dublin.

== Background and career ==
Paul O'Shaughnessy comes from Artane on the north side of Dublin city. He spent much of his youth in Donegal where he developed a love and talent for fiddle playing, learning at first not only from his mother, Pearl McBride (a fiddle player from a musical Donegal family) but also from the playing of Cavan fiddle player Antóin Mac Gabhann and from John Doherty. He was also influenced by Sligo flute player John Egan.

He was one of a number of outstanding contemporary players who were members of Comhaltas Ceoltóirí Éireann branches in the area, his playing partner whistle player Denis O'Brien among them. In later years, he spent time in Donegal, learning from source-players such as Con Cassidy and the Campbell family.

Paul has been appearing on Irish radio and television since the late 1970s, but became more widely known in the 1990s as a member of the Donegal-based group Altan (1988–92) (after he had met and played with founding members Frankie Kennedy & Mairéad Ní Mhaonaigh) and as a member of the Dublin-based group Beginish (late 1990s–early 2000s), two Irish folk music bands with whom he toured throughout the world.

Paul O'Shaughnessy is to be heard on their recordings and on a wide variety of others, including his solo album Stay Another While (POSCD 0001), and his duet albums with two flute players: Within a Mile of Dublin (SPINCD1000) with Paul McGrattan and Born for Sport with Harry Bradley (BFS001).

He has also completed a doctorate in Irish-language dialect studies.

For the first time in 12 years, Beginish (including Paul O'Shaughnessy) regrouped together for some concerts throughout 2013.

== Discography ==
=== With Altan ===
- 1989 Horse with a Heart
- 1990 The Red Crow
- 1992 Harvest Storm

=== With Beginish ===
- 1998 Beginish
- 2001 Stormy Weather

=== Solo albums ===
- 2000 Stay Another While (Claddagh Records – POS0001; 14 tracks featuring Frankie Lane on guitar, mandolin, dobro & bass)
- 2016 The Friendly Visit – An Céilí (Claddagh Records – POS0002; 14 tracks featuring Garry O'Briain, Eoin O'Neill and fiddlers Pearl and Kate O'Shaughnessy (respectively Paul O'Shaughnessy's mother and daughter))

=== Duet albums ===
Paul O'Shaughnessy & Harry Bradley

- 2005 Born for Sport (Own label – BFS001; duet album with flute player Harry Bradley; also featuring John Blake (bouzouki))

Paul O'Shaughnessy & Paul McGrattan

- 2013 Within a Mile of Dublin (Faetain Records – SPINCD1000; duet album with flute player Paul McGrattan; also featuring Seánie McPhail (guitar), Noel O'Grady (bouzouki), Colm Murphy (bodhrán))
