= Frankie Kennedy =

Northern Irish musician (1955–1994)

- Frankie Kennedy in the 1970s.

Background information
- Born: 30 September 1955; Belfast, County Antrim, Northern Ireland
- Died: 19 September 1994 (aged 38) Royal Victoria Hospital, Belfast, Northern Ireland
- Genres: Irish traditional; folk; World music
- Occupation: Flautist
- Instruments: Flute
- Years active: 1981–1994
- Labels: Gael Linn; Green Linnet
- Website: www.frankiekennedy.com

Frankie Kennedy (30 September 1955 – 19 September 1994) was a flute and tin whistle player born in Belfast, Northern Ireland. He was also the co-founder of the band Altan, formed with his wife Mairéad Ní Mhaonaigh. The popular Frankie Kennedy Winter Music School was founded in 1994 in his honour.

== Biography ==
=== Early life ===
He had three sisters and one brother.

Kennedy's uncle was married to the daughter of Robert Cinnamond, a singer from Glenavy, County Antrim, who was a frequent visitor in his family home.

His memory of [Cinnamond] was as a gentle soul singing "Dobbin's Flowery Vale", a version that Frankie plays. And he had all those northern versions of songs. Frankie used to say, "really I have no tradition," but he had a connection with the tradition which he didn't know himself.

— Mairéad Ní Mhaonaigh

Kennedy became interested in Irish traditional music when he was 18 years old, through the music of Horslips, Planxty, The Chieftains, and The Boys of the Lough. He learned his Irish as a young man in Belfast's Cumann Chluain Árd and travelled frequently to Donegal to perform at local sessions in Gweedore with Mairéad Ní Mhaonaigh.

=== Marriage ===
When Kennedy was eighteen he took a sixth form summer trip to the Gaeltacht of Gweedore in County Donegal. He went to a session one evening and there met a fifteen-year-old fiddle player named Mairéad, daughter of the session's leader Proinsias Ó Maonaigh. They were attracted to each other, and he wrote to her regularly after leaving Donegal.

He was advised by a friend that he should learn an instrument if he intended to court Mairéad, and so he got a whistle and taught himself to play. Later he learned the flute, a somewhat louder instrument, so that he could hear himself in sessions. His love for Mairéad coupled with perfectionist tendencies turned him into a well-respected flute player.

Kennedy and Mairéad Ní Mhaonaigh married in 1981.

=== Forming Altan ===
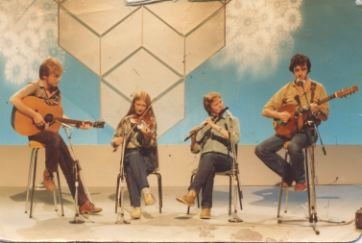
Kennedy performing with the short-lived band Ragairne on RTÉ television in the early 1980s.

The new couple continued to play at sessions in Donegal, and this formed the basis for their musical partnership. They made their recording debut on Albert Fry's eponymous record in 1979 and later formed a short-lived group called Ragairne which also included Gearóid Ó Maonaigh, Ní Mhaonaigh's brother, on guitar, and was rejoined in 1981 by singer Eithne Ní Bhraonáin, later known as Enya.

Joined by bouzouki player Ciarán Curran and Eithne Ní Bhraonáin, now known as Enya, on synthesizer, Kennedy and Mairéad Ní Mhaonaigh released a recording entitled Ceol Aduaidh on Gael-Linn records in 1983.

At the time, Kennedy and Ní Mhaonaigh were earning their living by teaching at St. Oliver Plunkett National School in Malahide, north County Dublin. But live performances in 1984 and 1985, particularly in the United States, convinced them that there was an audience for "no-compromise traditional music played with heart and drive," and they were persuaded to give up teaching.

During this time, the group added guitarist Mark Kelly and released in 1987 a record called Altan, named after a lake in Donegal, although the name Altan wasn't used for the band on that release. But the band's musical momentum was building rapidly, and they would release three records in three years as Altan between 1989 and 1991. Altan was produced by Dónal Lunny, who subsequently appeared as either a producer or guest musician on every Altan album which followed.

=== Later life and death ===
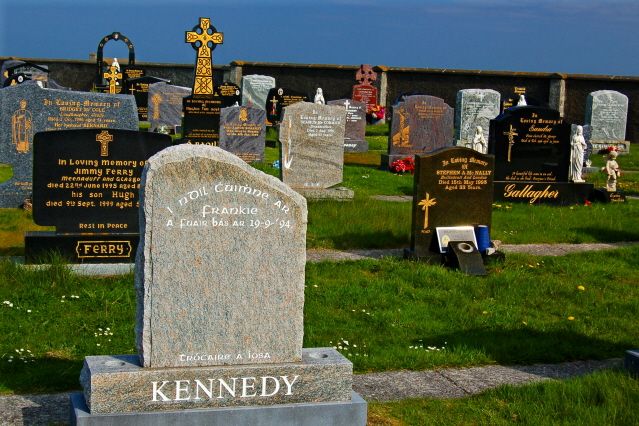
Kennedy's grave at Magheragallon Cemetery in Gweedore, County Donegal.

Kennedy was diagnosed with Ewing's sarcoma, a vicious form of cancer, in 1992. Despite his illness Kennedy continued to tour and record with Altan. The band released Island Angel in 1993, and continued to tour through 1994, the year of his death. Although Kennedy had experienced 18 months in remission, the cancer returned "full blast" afterwards. He died on 19 September at the age of 38 in the Royal Victoria Hospital in Belfast.

Kennedy is buried in Gweedore, County Donegal.

The flute-player Frankie Kennedy, of the traditional group Altan, was buried yesterday after a concelebrated Mass in Derrybeg Church, Gaoth Dobhair, Co. Donegal, attended by hundreds of musicians from Ireland, Britain, the Continent and North America. The prayers were led by Father Gary Hastings in a Mass sung by members of Cor Chuil Aodha, led by Peadar O Riada. Raidio na Gaeltachta broadcast the Mass live, with overlays of the flute-player's music. Matt Molloy of the Chieftains led the communion with a slow air; Altan members Daithi Sproule, Paul Kelly, Dermot Byrne, Ciaran Curran and Ciaran Tourish blended with mazurkas from fiddler Johnny Doherty, and Paddy Glackin and Donal Lunny concluded on fiddle and synthesizer playing "Paddy's Rambles in the Park". With his flute on the coffin, Frankie Kennedy was saluted by Altan's playing of his own reel, "Harvest Storm".

— The Irish Times

Altan, in accordance with Kennedy's wishes, continued to record and perform after his death.

== Legacy ==
=== Flute style ===
Kennedy was widely considered to be a master of the simple system flute. "Simple system" flutes are so named because they do not use a metal key system as complex as the Boehm system found on the Western concert flute; for the majority of notes played on the instrument the player covers the tone holes directly with his or her fingers rather than using a metal key. Simple system flutes are predominant in Irish traditional music.

Kennedy learned to play the flute in his birth city of Belfast, as part of a musical community which produced a number of well-known flute players, including Hammy Hamilton, Gary Hastings, Gerry O'Donnell, Desi Wilkinson, and Sam Murray.

It was a good time to be learning the flute there, because everybody had their own style. There wasn't anyone copying the next person – they were all seeking music from the likes of Roger Sherlock, Cathal McConnell and Conal Ó Gráda, or going down the country. He just threw himself into the music. Frankie was also a huge rock and roll fan – Rory Gallagher, Van Morrison. He never played any of it. – he just loved going to hear different types of music.

— Mairéad Ní Mhaonaigh

Kennedy's style was characterised first and foremost by the music he played; most of the tunes originated from County Donegal, and his flute style corresponded well with the characteristic Donegal fiddle tradition. His recorded legacy is almost exclusively with his wife and Altan, although he did perform on Clannad's album Banba.

His playing was smooth and somewhat less heavily ornamented than that of other popular Irish flute players like Matt Molloy. But like Molloy, the use of flattened "blue notes" for expressive purposes "was a strong feature of Frankie Kennedy's playing with Altan."

Kennedy played flutes made by Chris Wilkes and Patrick Olwell.

=== Frankie Kennedy Winter School ===
Established in December 1994 in remembrance of Kennedy and with the intention of keeping both his memory and the music of County Donegal alive, the Frankie Kennedy Winter School (Scoil Gheimhridh Frankie Kennedy in Irish gaelic) was an annual series of classes which was held for almost two decades in Gaoth Dobhair (Gweedore), County Donegal until the last edition occurred in December 2013–January 2014. In 2004 the school released a CD compilation of solo Irish flute played by a "who's who" of contemporary masters of the instrument, called An Ghaoth Aduaidh/The North Wind, in honour of Kennedy. Kennedy's mother Agnes still attends the festival annually and is close to Mairéad's family.

=== Memorial ===
St. Oliver Plunkett School, where Kennedy and Mairéad taught, planted a tree in their Garden of Peace in memory of Kennedy. The school's staff and pupils planted a Wild Pear, used to make flutes, in his honour. A plaque was also created, with the following inscription:

On the day of the planting ceremony over 400 of the school pupils, many past pupils and staff members put on a very special day-long marathon festival of music, song and dance. There was a three fold purpose. We wished to honour Frankie. We wished to celebrate his life in the way he enjoyed most, showing the joy and happiness that we can get from music, song and dance. Thirdly we wanted to raise funds for cancer research and the Hospice Foundation. We achieved our aims and had a marvellous day in the process. Mairead and Altan's Dermot and Ciaran came and played for huge audience who had gathered. It was at once a very poignant though terribly happy day.

=== Tributes ===
Dozens of songs have been written and recorded about Kennedy, including the following:

- Dan Ar Braz, then a member of the band L'Héritage des Celtes, wrote, recorded and released the song "Left in Peace" in L'Héritage des Celtes's 1995 live album En concert as a tribute to Kennedy.
- Altan have recorded several songs lamenting Kennedy, including Mairead Ni Mhaonaigh's jig "A Tune for Frankie" (which is the last track on Altan's 1996 album Blackwater) along with "Time Has Passed" and "A Moment in Time" (which are two tracks from Altan's 1997 album Runaway Sunday).
- In 1996, Solas wrote and recorded the instrumental "Lament for Frankie", and dedicated it to Kennedy.
- Luka Bloom's "Cool Breeze" on his 1998 album Salty Heaven was written in commemoration and in lamentation of Kennedy's death.
- Enya's 2000 song "Only Time" featured in a movie about a cancer sufferer was dedicated to Kennedy.
- The tune/song "Dobbin's Flowery Vale" has become synonymous with Kennedy and has been recorded by Mairead Ní Mhaonaigh on her 2009 debut solo album Imeall.

== Discography ==
Frankie Kennedy performs on the following records
Year	Artist	Title	Label	Notes
1979	Albert Fry	Albert Fry	Gael-Linn Records	
1983	Frankie Kennedy and Mairéad Ní Mhaonaigh	Ceol Aduaidh	Gael-Linn Records	Re-released by Green Linnet in 1993
1987	Frankie Kennedy and Mairéad Ní Mhaonaigh	Altan	Green Linnet	
1989	Altan	Horse With a Heart	Green Linnet	
1990	Altan	The Red Crow	Green Linnet	
1991	Altan	Harvest Storm	Green Linnet	
1993	Altan	Island Angel	Green Linnet	
1993	Clannad	Banba	BMG	
1995	Altan	The First Ten Years: 1986–1995	Green Linnet	"Best of" CD compiled by Dónal Lunny
1997	Altan	The Best of Altan	Green Linnet	"Best of" CD with no new studio tracks, but includes a bonus CD with a live recording from 1989
