= Beidh Aonach Amárach =

Irish folk song

"Beidh Aonach Amárach" ('there will be a fair tomorrow') is an Irish folk song. The song tends to be most popular among children learning to speak, and is taught to people studying Irish Gaelic. The song's author is unclear, but the song traces its roots to the troubadour and trouvère styles, which are generally believed to have started in 12th century France.

== Synopsis ==
In the lyrics, a young girl is asking her mother's permission to travel to a fair the following day in County Clare, Ireland, but also saying how pointless it is to discuss, as she likely will not even be going. She also says that she is infatuated with the cobbler (shoemaker), and asks her mother if she may marry the man. The girl says she'd rather be with the cobbler man than any army sergeant or officer. Her mother then tells her she is only ten years old, and that when she turns thirteen, she will be old enough to make her own decisions. The woman then chuckles at having a daughter who is in love with a shoemaker. The girl continues to pine for the man and asking permission to attend the fair.

Irish singer Joe Heaney claimed that, in the original song, the girl says she is in love with the cobbler because she does not own any shoes, and was enticed as soon as she saw the man's handiwork.

== Lyrics ==
Cúrfa (chorus): "Is a mháithrín an ligfidh tú chun aonaigh mé? Is a mhuirnín óg ná healaí é." (x2) (Mother, will you let me go to the fair? My dear child, please, don’t ask.)

"Beidh aonach amárach in gContae an Chláir (x3); cén mhaith domh é ní bheidh mé ann." (There’s a fair tomorrow in County Clare; what does it matter? I won’t be there.)

(Chorus)

"Tá 'níon bheag agam is tá sí óg (x3), is tá sí i ngrá leis an ghreasaí bróg." (I have a young daughter, and she is in love with the cobbler.)

(Chorus)

"Níl tú ach deich nó aon deag fós (x3); nuair a bheas tú trí deag beidh tú mór." (You are not but ten or eleven years old; when you’re thirteen you’ll be big.)

(Chorus)

"B'fhearr liom féin mo ghreasaí bróg (x3), 'n fir na n'arm, faoina lascú óir." (I would most prefer my cobbler, more than any man in the army, with his gold bands.)

(Chorus)

"Is iomaí bean a phós go h-óg (x3), is a mhair go socair lena greasaí bróg." (Many-a woman married young, and lived peacefully with her cobbler.)

== Notable recordings ==
- Na Casaidigh — Irish Childhood Songs (1997)
- Altan — Another Sky (2000) - with the reel "Bean a'ti ar lar" ('the woman of the house on the floor')
- John Spillane — Irish Songs We Learned At School (2008)
