= Mick Kinsella =

- Born: Mick Kinsella; Tullow, Ireland
- Genres: Irish, blues, jazz, bluegrass
- Occupations: Musician, composer, multi-instrumentalist
- Instruments: Harmonica, percussion, English concertina

Mick Kinsella is an Irish harmonica player from Tullow, Ireland. He originally played drums for rock bands and showbands for many years before switching to harmonica. Specialized in playing blues, he has played Irish traditional music on 50 albums with other artists, such as the Irish band Altan, Antonio Breschi, Martin Murray and Cormac Breatnach.

With his first solo album, Harmonica, he has enlarged his reputation as the most innovative contemporary Irish harmonica player. On the album he plays many styles on chromatic and diatonic harmonicas, including some of his own compositions. On the album sleeve notes is written: "He is a wonderful musician and more importantly an equally wonderful person. He deserves to be heard. I know that this gem will bring much joy to all who listen!"

== Discography ==
=== Solo work ===
- Harmonica (2000)

=== With other artists ===
- My Irish Portrait (Antonio Breschi – 1998)
- Another Sky (Altan – 2000)
- The Best of Altan: The Songs (Altan – 2003)
- Steve Larkin & Mick Kinsella (2016)
