= Local Ground =

Studio album by Altan
- Released: 1 March 2005
- Recorded: Summer 2004
- Studio: Westland Studios in Dublin, Ireland
- Genre: Celtic
- Length: 46:42
- Label: Narada (VERTCD069)
- Producer: Altan

Altan chronology
The Blue Idol (2002)	Local Ground (2005)	25th Anniversary Celebration (2010)

Professional ratings
Review scores
Source	Rating
Allmusic	(Note: Allmusic erroneously refers to the lead singer/violinist as 'Maighread'; they are mistaken and may have misspelled actual bandmember Mairéad Ní Mhaonaigh's name. This is the case with many Allmusic reviews of Altan's music - other erroneous 'variants' include 'Maircad Ni Mhaonaigh', 'Maighread Ní Mhaonaigh', and 'Maighread Ní Dhomhnaill' [a wholly different person].)
musicscotland.com	very favourable
Amazon.com	very favourable
Tom Hull	B

Local Ground is the ninth studio album by Irish folk music group Altan, released in March 2005 on the Narada label.

== Recording ==
For the recording of Local Ground, Altan invited a few of their friends in music to play on the album. Former Bothy Band founder Tríona Ní Dhomhnaill plays piano on guitarist Dáithí Sproule's composition "The Roseville", a kind of a slip-reel. Steve Cooney guests on bass and Dónal Lunny adds guitar. Altan have asked Galician piper Carlos Núñez to contribute some gaita (Galician bagpipes) to two tracks. Bodhrán maestro Jim Higgins provides the rhythmic pulse on many of the tracks while Graham Henderson adds some touches of keyboard colour to a set of reels.

== Artwork and title ==
The cover art is a reproduction of a painting by Kilkenny-based artist Bernadette Kiely. The album title "Local Ground" comes from the painting title.

== Critical reception ==
Local Ground received a very positive review from the musicscotland.com website, describing it as «an album of beauty, energy, grace and finesse, retaining the enthusiasm that originally shaped [Altan's] music.»

The album also received a warm review from Amazon.com website's critic Christina Roden, stating: «For [Local Ground], the veteran Irish ensemble has gathered 13 traditional and newly composed tunes. [...] The set list includes several of the jaunty dance tunes that are the soul of Irish music. [...] Mairéad Ní Mhaonaigh's fragile, girlish soprano creates many of the album's most memorable moments [such as] "Adieu My Lovely Nancy" and [the] lullaby "Dun Do Shuil". [...] The entire album has home-town warmth to it, a sense of achieved heritage that is at once soothing and invigorating.»

== Track listing ==
All songs, medleys and tunes are traditional, except as indicated.

No.	Title	Writer(s)	Type	Length
1.	"Éirigh's Cuir Ort Do Chuid Éadaigh"		Song #1	3:18
2.	"Tommy Peoples/The Road to Cashel/The Repeal of the Union/Richie's Reel"	Charlie Lennon ("The Road To Cashel") / Ciaran Tourish ("Richie's Reel")	Medley #1 (4 reels)	3:46
3.	"Is the Big Man Within?/Tilly Finn's Reel"		Medley #2 (2 reels)	3:48
4.	"Adieu, My Lovely Nancy"		Song #2	3:15
5.	"Bó Mhín Na Toitean/Con McGinley's Highland/Seanamhach Tube Station"	John Carthy ("Seanamhach Tube Station")	Medley #3 (1 march, 1 highland, 1 jig)	4:01
6.	"Amhrán Pheadair Bhreathnaigh"		Song #3	3:54
7.	"The Roseville"	Dáithí Sproule	Tune #1 (slip-reel)	2:21
8.	"As I Roved Out"		Song #4	4:20
9.	"Spórt"	Peadar Ó Riada	Tune #2 (1 jig)	3:02
10.	"The Humours of Castlefin/Nia's Dance/An Dúidín"	Mairéad Ní Mhaonaigh ("Nia's Dance")	Medley #4 (3 reels)	3:26
11.	"The Wind and Rain"		Song #5 (song & jig)	4:03
12.	"The Silver Slipper"		Tune #3 (1 jig)	3:32
13.	"Dún Do Shúil"		Song #6	3:56
14.	"Andy Dixon's/Ril Chois Claiding/The Swilly Reel (Bonus Track only available on the Japanese release before the 12 March 2021 re-issue)"		Reels	3:29

== 2021 re-issue ==
Originally released in the US in March 2005 by Narada Records, Local Ground had been unavailable for several years. Compass Records (Altan's label partner since the 2012 release of Gleann Nimhe – The Poison Glen and home to most of the band's catalog) re-issued Local Ground on 12 March 2021. The 14-track Deluxe re-issue includes a bonus track "Andy Dixon's/Ríl Chois Claidigh/The Swilly Reel," which was previously only available on the Japanese release (also long out of print).

== Personnel ==
=== Altan ===
Adapted from the AllMusic credits.

- Mairéad Ní Mhaonaigh – fiddle, vocals
- Ciaran Tourish – fiddle, whistle, backing vocals
- Ciarán Curran – bouzouki, mandolin
- Mark Kelly – guitar, bouzouki, backing vocals
- Dermot Byrne – Accordion
- Dáithí Sproule – guitar, backing vocals

=== Guest musicians ===
- Stephen Cooney – bass
- Graham Henderson – keyboards
- Jim Higgins – percussion, bodhrán
- Dónal Lunny – guitar
- Tríona Ní Dhomhnaill – piano
- Carlos Núñez – whistle, bagpipes (Galician gaita)

=== Production ===
- Alvin Sweeney – engineer
- Bernadette Kiely – artwork
- Édain O'Donnell – photography

== Track notes ==
1. "Éirigh 's Cuir Ort Do Chuid Éadaigh": guitar – Dónal Lunny; percussion – Jim Higgins; the title of the song means "Arise now and dress yourself quickly"
2. "Tommy Peoples/The Road to Cashel/The Repeal of the Union/Richie's Reel": bodhrán – Jim Higgins; keyboards – Graham Henderson
3. "Is the Big Man Within?/Tilly Finn's Reel": bodhrán – Jim Higgins; whistle, bagpipes (Galician gaita) – Carlos Núñez
4. "Adieu, My Lovely Nancy": bass – Stephen Cooney; percussion – Jim Higgins
5. "Bó Mhín Na Toitean/Con McGinley's Highland/Seanamhach Tube Station"
6. "Amhrán Pheadair Bhreathnaigh": bass – Stephen Cooney; translated by Proinsias Ó Maonaigh
7. "The Roseville": percussion – Jim Higgins; piano – Tríona Ní Dhomhnaill
8. "As I Roved Out"
9. "Spórt": percussion – Jim Higgins
10. "The Humours of Castlefin/Nia's Dance/An Dúidín": bass – Stephen Cooney; percussion – Jim Higgins
11. "The Wind and Rain": bass – Stephen Cooney; bodhrán – Jim Higgins
12. "The Silver Slipper": percussion – Jim Higgins; whistle, bagpipes (Galician gaita) – Carlos Núñez
13. "Dún Do Shúil": backing vocals – Ciaran Tourish, Dáithí Sproule, Mark Kelly; keyboards – Graham Henderson; translated by Proinsias Ó Maonaigh; the title of the song means "Close Your Eyes"

== Live performances ==
Altan played live in concert the following tracks:

- "Is the Big Man Within?/Tilly Finn's Reel"
- "The Roseville"
- "As I Roved Out"
- "The Humours of Castlefin/Nia's Dance/An Dúidín"
- "The Silver Slipper"
- "Dún Do Shúil"
