= Blackwater (Altan album) =

Studio album by Altan
- Released: 5 April 1996
- Studio: Windmill Lane Studios, Dublin, Ireland
- Genre: Celtic
- Length: 39:33
- Label: Virgin
- Producer: Altan and Brian Masterson

Altan chronology
| Island Angel (1993) | Blackwater (1996) | Runaway Sunday (1997) |

Singles from Blackwater
- 1. "Blackwater" Released: 1996

Professional ratings
Review scores
| Source | Rating |
|---|---|
| Allmusic | (Note: Allmusic errenously refers to 'Maighread Ní Dhomhnaill' as the lead singer/violinist; they are mistaken and may have misremembered actual bandmember Mairéad Ní Mhaonaigh as Maighread Ní Dhomhnaill, a wholly different person. This is the case with many Allmusic reviews of Altan's music - other errenous 'variants' include 'Maircad Ni Mhaonaigh', 'Maighread Ní Mhaonaigh' and 'Maighread' .) |

Blackwater is the fifth studio album by County Donegal, Ireland, traditional music group Altan, released on 5 April 1996 through Virgin Records. Featuring an eclectic mix of Irish and Scottish jigs, reels, and hornpipes, along with a strathspey and barndance (both unique to County Donegal), Blackwater was Altan's first record to be produced and released following the tragic death of flautist and founding Altan member Frankie Kennedy in 1994; Kennedy was married to frontwoman Mairéad Ní Mhaonaigh. The final track, "A Tune For Frankie", is a tribute to Kennedy, a slip-jig (a unique 9/8 dance tune) composed by Ní Mhaonaigh herself. The track's arrangement gradually builds in intensity, with Ní Mhaonaigh's solo fiddle playing the first round before being joined by the rest of the band. Played slowly and thoughtfully, "A Tune For Frankie" makes use of many ornamental rolls and modal phrases; alternating between G-Mixolydian and G-Minor, the tune has a somber, yet majestic, flavour.

The album features "no-frills", clear arrangements of music and song; the intricately-woven double fiddles of Ni Mhaonaigh and Ciarán Tourish and the button accordion mastery of Dermot Byrne are expertly backed by Ciarán Curran on bouzouki and Dáithí Sproule and Mark Kelly on guitars. Three of the record's songs are sung in Irish, while a fourth ballad, "Ar Bhruach Na Carraige Báine" ('at the edge of the white rocks', a famous lovesong), is sung with verses in both English and Irish. "Blackwaterside", a song about falling in love with someone who is not interested, is sung in English and features a string section with the acclaimed Yo-Yo Ma on cello.

== Track listing ==
1. "Johnny Boyle's/King of the Pipers" (Jigs; Trad.) - 3.30
2. "Dark Haired Lass/Biddy From Muckross/Sean Maguire's" (Reels; Trad.) - 2:51
3. "Stór, A Stór, A Ghrá" (Trad.) - 2:51
4. "Strathspey*/Con McGinley's/The Newfoundland Reel" (Strathspey & reels) - 3:11 *The tune titled "Strathspey" is a slowed version of the reel "The King of Meenasillagh", which appears on Altan's later record, Another Sky (2000).
5. "Tá Mé 'Mo Shuí" (I Am Awake) (Trad.) - 4:08
6. "An Gasúr Mor/Bunker Hill/Dogs Among the Bushes" (Hornpipe & reels) - 2:36
7. "Molly Na gCuach Ní Chuilleanáin" (Curly-Haired Molly) (Trad.) - 2:35
8. "Jenny Picking Cockles*/Farewell to Leitrim*/John Doherty's" (Reels) - 2:41 *The first two reels on this track are printed in the wrong order, as per the liner notes, with "Farewell to Leitrim" being the opening tune, followed by "Jenny Picking Cockles".
9. "Ar Bhruach Na Carraige Báine" (The Edge of the White Rocks) (Trad.) - 2:38
10. "The Dance of the Honeybees" (barndance) (by Charlie Lennon) - 3:24
11. "Blackwaterside" (Trad.) - 3:43
12. "A Tune for Frankie" (slip jig) (by Mairéad Ní Mhaonaigh) - 3:25

== Personnel ==
=== Altan ===
- Mairéad Ní Mhaonaigh – Fiddle, vocals
- Ciaran Tourish – Fiddle, whistle, backing vocals
- Dermot Byrne – Accordion, melodeon
- Ciarán Curran – Bouzouki
- Mark Kelly – Guitar, backing vocals
- Dáithí Sproule – Guitar, backing vocals

=== Guest musicians ===
- Steve Cooney – Bass (tracks 7, 9, 10, 12), backing vocals (tracks 3, 7)
- Conan Doyle – Backing vocals (track 3)
- Jimmy Higgins – Bodhrán (tracks 1, 3, 5), darrbuka (track 8), snare drum (track 7), wood block (track 9), clay drums (track 3)
- Dónal Lunny – Bouzouki (track 10), bodhrán (tracks 4, 7, 9, 12), keyboards (tracks 5, 7, 9, 12)
- Maighréad Ní Dhomhnaill – Backing vocals (track 3)
- Tríona Ní Dhomhnaill – Backing vocals (track 3), piano (track 11)
- Anna Ní Mhaonaigh – Backing vocals (track 7)
- Brendan Power – Harmonica (tracks 3, 7, 9)
- String quartet:
  - Máire Breatnach — Viola
  - Annette Cleary — Cello
  - David James — Cello
  - Tommy Kane — Violin

=== Production ===
- Brian Masterson – Producer, Engineer
- David Scheinmann – Photography
- The Design Corporation – Design
