= Island Angel =

Album by Altan

Studio album by Altan
- Released: July 1993
- Recorded: Windmill Lane Studios, Dublin, Ireland, July 1993
- Genre: Celtic
- Length: 45:21
- Label: Green Linnet
- Producer: Brian Masterson and Altan

Altan chronology
Harvest Storm (1992)	Island Angel (1993)	Blackwater (1996)

Professional ratings
Review scores
Source	Rating
Allmusic	(Note: Allmusic errenously refers to 'Maighread Ní Mhaonaigh' as the lead singer/violinist; they are mistaken and may have misspelled actual bandmember Mairéad Ní Mhaonaigh's name. This is the case with many Allmusic reviews of Altan's music – other errenous 'variants' include 'Maircad Ni Mhaonaigh', 'Maighread', and 'Maighread Ní Dhomhnaill' [a wholly different person].)

Island Angel is the fourth studio album by Altan, released in 1993 on the Green Linnet label. In 1995, Q included Island Angel in its publication "In Our Lifetime: Q's 100 Best Albums 1986–94", a list compiled to celebrate its 100th issue. It was also the final album to feature founding member Frankie Kennedy who died a year after its release.

== Track listing ==
All arrangements are by Altan.

1. "Tommy Peoples/The Windmill/Fintan McManus's" – 3:14
2. "Bríd Óg Ní Mháille" – 5:00
3. "Fermanagh Highland/Donegal Highland/John Doherty's/King George IV" – 4:06
4. "An Mhaighdean Mhara" – 2:52
5. "Andy de Jarlis/Ingonish/Mrs. McGhee" – 3:34
6. "Humours of Andytown/Kylebrack Rambler/The Gladstone" – 3:15
7. "Dúlamán" – 3:42
8. "Mazurka" – 2:42
9. "The Jug of Punch" – 3:29
10. "Glory Reel/The Heathery Cruach" – 2:54
11. "An Cailín Gaelach" – 3:24
12. "Drumnagarry/Pirrie Wirrie/Big John's" – 3:29
13. "Aingeal an Oileáin (Island Angel)" – 3:40

All titles are traditional except the following:

- "The Windmill Reel" – composed by Ciaran Tourish
- "Angeal An Oileáin/Island Angel" – composed by Mairéad Ní Mhaonaigh
- "Humours of Andytown" – composed by Frankie Kennedy
- "Fintan McManus's Reel" – composed by Fintan McManus
- "The Kylebrack Rambler" – composed by Finbar Dwyer
- "Andy de Jarlis/Ingonish/Mrs. McGhee" – composed by Mike McDougall

See tune identifications for this album at irishtune.info.

== Personnel ==
=== Altan ===
- Mairéad Ní Mhaonaigh – Fiddle, vocals
- Frankie Kennedy – Flute, low whistle, vocals (backing)
- Ciaran Tourish – Fiddle, whistle, vocals (backing)
- Ciarán Curran – Bouzouki, bouzouki-guitar
- Mark Kelly – Guitar, vocals (backing)
- Dáithí Sproule – Guitar, vocals (backing)

=== Guest musicians ===
- Dermot Byrne – Accordion (tracks 1,6,8)
- Steve Cooney – Bass (tracks 7,9)
- Tommy Hayes – Percussion (tracks 7,9,10,12)
- Dónal Lunny – Bodhrán, keyboards, bouzouki (tracks 1,2,4,7,9,13)
- Neil Martin – Cello (track 2)
- Anna Ní Mhaonaigh – Vocals (backing) (track 7)

== Production ==
- Brian Masterson and Altan – Producer
- Brian Masterson – Engineer
- Alister McMillan – Assistant Engineer
- Colm Henry – Photography
- Ross Wilson – Cover Image
- Brian Wittman/Wittman Design – Design
