= The Widening Gyre (album) =

Studio album by Altan
- Released: Ireland 20 February 2015; United Kingdom 23 February 2015; United States 24 February 2015; France 19 May 2015
- Recorded: Rehearsals: June 2014 (Note: On 3 June 2014, in their Twitter page and Pledge Music website page, Altan announced that they were at the time working on a new studio album planned to be recorded in Nashville, Tennessee. Indeed, the band was at the time in pre-production and had started rehearsing potential material for the new album with the intention to play and sing these new pieces at various concerts during Summer 2014.) at Mairéad Ní Mhaonaigh's house in Derrybeg, County Donegal, Ireland. Recording sessions: 29 July-7 August 2014 (10 days) at Compass Records recording studios in Nashville, Tennessee.
- Genre: Celtic
- Length: 58:59
- Label: Compass Records (746402) (US) Keltia (France)
- Producers: Garry West and Altan

Altan chronology
Gleann Nimhe – The Poison Glen (2012)	The Widening Gyre (2015)	The Gap Of Dreams (2018)

The Widening Gyre is the twelfth studio album by Irish folk music group Altan and their eleventh studio album of original material, released in February 2015 on the Compass Records label. It was released to critical acclaim.

== Overview ==
=== Presentation ===
This is the first studio album of original material to be released by Altan in almost 3 years since the release of Gleann Nimhe – The Poison Glen in 2012. This is also the first Altan album to feature new band member Martin Tourish on accordion.

In January 2015, Altan revealed that The Widening Gyre would be the name of their new album to be released in Ireland on 20 February 2015, in the UK on 23 February 2015 and in the US on 24 February 2015. And as they borrowed the title from "The Second Coming", one of W. B. Yeats poems, the first Irishman to be awarded the Nobel Prize for Literature in 1923. Altan's official website published a presentation of their new studio album The Widening Gyre giving many details about the new album: the new musical direction taken by the band, the album recording process and the participation of numerous guest musicians as well as the titles of some of the new tracks. The very same day, on their "Widening Gyre" iTunes page, Altan revealed the titles of the 14 tracks from their new studio album and released them for sale.

On 27 January 2015, on their "Widening Gyre" Compass Records page, Altan made available short snippets of their new tracks.

=== New musical direction ===
Mairéad Ní Mhaonaigh introduced the music on the album as an exploration of the influence of Appalachian music on Irish music. Recorded «with many good friends in the studio and Compass Records co-founder Garry West in the producer's chair steer[ing] the band in the studio to open up musically while somehow managing to help keep the integrity of Altan intact», the album is the result of a fusion «of the traditional Irish music that the members of Altan are known for, namely Donegal fiddling and Gaelic singing traditions, with American roots music, particularly that of the Appalachian bluegrass fiddle» and a celebration of the relationships between Altan and lifelong friends they've made through music.

The Widening Gyre straddles time as it manages to remind listeners of the ancient bond between Irish and Appalachian music while at the same time breaking new ground through collaborations between masters of American roots music and Celtic music.

Mairéad stated: «The title "The Widening Gyre" appeals to us and depicts the spiral of life, widening and embracing the new. It has an innate energy. We think that idea is reflected in the album's music».

The Widening Gyre marked a development in Altan's music after nearly thirty years together.

=== Recording ===
Altan recorded the new album over ten days from 29 July to 7 August 2014 entirely in Nashville, Tennessee (at Compass Records recording studios) to collaborate there with longtime friends and guests, many of the roots musicians the band members have met over their thirty years together including Tim O'Brien, Sam Bush, Jerry Douglas, Bryan Sutton and Compass co-founder Alison Brown.

=== Musical themes and guest musicians ===
The list of guests on the new album is as diverse as it is impressive:

Mary Chapin Carpenter, a friend of the band since the 1990s, lent her vocals to the song "White Birds" to create a lush, meditative re-imagining of the W. B. Yeats poem about being a bird on the sea, an appropriate metaphor for a band who has musically and physically crossed the Atlantic in the making of the album.» Mairéad introduces «Eddi Reader as «an amazing singer and very generous person» offering her angelic backing vocals to "Far Beyond Carrickfinn" and she recalls that Altan have played concerts with Reader before and [that] they were delighted to finally have the Glasgow native join them in the studio.»

Altan borrowed the mournful waltz "No Ash Will Burn" from the legendary Nashville songwriter Walt Aldridge. Mairead's crystalline vocals unlock the Celtic undertones of the song while standing in stark contrast to the plaintive baritone of Bruce Molsky, a longtime friend of the band and well-known old-time fiddler and singer.

The bluegrass presence shows itself most clearly on "Buffalo Gals" and "Thomasino (Thomas Tourish's Tune)," a lively fiddle song written by Altan's own Ciarán Tourish who's joined by bluegrass greats Alison Brown, Sam Bush, Jerry Douglas, Todd Phillips, Bryan Sutton and Darol Anger.

Mairead gushes about Darol Anger: «His unique approach gives a different color to the music which opens up amazing possibilities with Irish traditional music. He is a true artist with that fiddle!» She also declares Stuart Duncan to be, «a fiddler's fiddler! He can create so many amazing variations on that instrument, it's unreal!»

Tim O'Brien duets on "The House Carpenter (Gypsy Davy)," a track which spotlights the shared musical roots of Irish and Appalachian music with references to both of these historical songs. O'Brien is best known for his work with Hot Rize, but like many dedicated bluegrass musicians, has shown a deep interest in Celtic music.

== Funding ==
Altan called on Pledge Music's services to finance their new studio album.

On 3 January 2015, Mairéad Ní Mhaonaigh explained why Altan made this choice and thanked all the pledgers for helping Altan with the fundraising campaign and for bringing it to completion (reaching, at that time, 101% of goal): «The music business is a changing world for professional musicians as ourselves. We depend more on live concerts to make our living. We can no longer depend on big record company funding to get our music out there, we have to do it ourselves. Now with your help we have funded our latest album which we are really happy with.» She also stated that Altan have licensed the new album to Compass Records in the US, that Gary West of Compass co-produced it and that after 30 years recording studio albums, Altan «have taken a new approach with this one».

The Altan Pledge Music pre-order page announced that all exclusive pre-orders would be fulfilled by 17 February 2015.

Apart from the new album on CD, the Altan Pledge Music page offers many original and exclusive items. (Note: Original and exclusive Altan items such as: the new album on CD signed by the band members; a studio quality FLAC (Free Lossless Audio Codec) file of the new album together with a signed track list and photo; a personalized postcard from the band; a signed limited edition Altan poster; a lyric sheet handwritten («in a very special way») by Altan of the song of the purchaser's choice; a photo of Altan, signed by the whole band; a Donegal pen engraved with Altan logo, a signed set list from a recent show; 2 gig tickets + a meeting with Altan backstage after the gig; a record by Altan of an answer phone message; a framed signed digipack file of the new album; the purcharser's name in the CD credits + the signed CD; Donegal GAA Jerseys signed by all the band members; a song of the purchaser's choice performed over Skype by Altan just for him; the purchaser's appearance as an executive producer in the album liner notes (claimed as «the highest honor of them all»); the original artwork proof of the new album signed; the chance for the purchaser to join Altan on stage to sing one of their songs, at a show of the purchaser's choice; the chance to purchase a fiddle, guitar or bouzouki («all well played and travelled») signed by all the band members; Altan's coming to the purchaser's house for a private house concert anywhere in Ireland and potentially anywhere outside Ireland.)

== Artwork ==
In a 20 January 2015 post on her Facebook page, Mairéad Ní Mhaonaigh revealed the cover of their new studio album and that the art work was done by their artist friend Édaín O'Donnell who previously designed the cover of their previous album Gleann Nimhe - The Poison Glen.

== Critical reception ==
Professional ratings
Review scores
Source	Rating
The Irish Post	5/5 stars
Irish Voice	very favourable
The Irish Times	4/5 stars
The Arts Desk	very favourable
The Telegraph (UK)	4/5 stars
PopMatters	8/10 medals
Irish Music Magazine	very favourable
Folkworks (US)	very favourable
Trad' Mag	5/5 stars

On 5 February 2015, before its release, The Widening Gyre was awarded full marks by The Irish Post's columnist Joe Giltrap, describing the album as "a really nicely balanced album", "an album of pure quality", "a great album from a great band".

The album received a very positive review from the New York-based Irish Voice's music critic Paul Keating, writing: "[Would] Altan have shared stages and off-hours sparks with a wealth of kindred musical spirits from both sides of the Atlantic and the Irish Sea [over the past thirty years], the recording shows that depth and creativity with lots of new stuff to savor and some reinventions of recognizable material as well, interpreted by some of the best musicians you can find in roots music.".

The Widening Gyre received a four star album review (out of 5) from The Irish Times's reviewer Siobhan Long, stating that Altan "have reinvigorated their sound in the process of [recording in] Nashville with newcomer Martin Tourish on piano accordion [and] an all-star cast [of Appalachian bluegrass musicians]".

The Arts Desk website's music critic Peter Quinn, stated: "Listeners looking for the uniquely driving tune sets that Altan are famous for have plenty to get their teeth into", describing The Widening Gyre as "an absolute treasure trove" and Ní Mhaonaigh's voice as "indescribably beautiful", "songs [occupying] a special place on any Altan album", adding: "Ní Mhaonaigh's soaring, soul-stirring vocals on "Far Beyond Carrickfinn" [...] is one of the most touching things you'll hear this year".

The Telegraph gave it 4 stars (out of 5), describing it as "a wonderful mix of Irish and Appalachian music."

On 9 March 2015, The Widening Gyre was honoured "album of the week" on RTÉ radio 1.

PopMatters's gave it a rating of 8 stars out of 10. Music critic Lee Zimmerman, stating: "The Widening Gyre is a defining moment for Altan. [...] [It] is much more than a mere scholarly treatise. The energy and enthusiasm are palatable, and there's a sense of celebration that echoes throughout. [...] Altan has made the kind of album that defines them as distinctive."

Irish Music Magazine's critic Eileen McCabe, stated: "Altan are just at the start of their next chapter and having shown their inimitable metal with The Widening Gyre; they have set the standard at an all time high."

Folkworks reviewer Anya Sturm, stated: "Altan's new CD The Widening Gyre is a fantastic collection of traditional Gaelic songs mixed in with Irish jam regulars. The band is joined by many special guests in this collection of upbeat lively jam tunes as well as slower songs sung by Mairéad Ní Mhaonaigh. [...] This CD is a great mixture of what you would expect from a traditional Irish band combined with American influences."

In the May–June 2015 issue of (French magazine) Trad' Mag, folk critic Philippe Cousin awarded The Widening Gyre full marks (giving the album a "Bravo!!!" award), stating: "If Donegal is still part of it here, bluegrass colours dot here and there some of the fourteen tracks of this superb album. [...] Throughout the album, American and Irish tunes intertwine with each other and lay down a wonderful template sublimated by Mairéad Ní Mhaonaigh's crystalline voice and her fellow musicians' instruments. Once again, a nice piece of work."

In December 2015, The Telegraph's culture editor Martin Chilton chose The Widening Gyre as one of the 70 best folk music albums of the year 2015.

== Commercial performance ==
On 7 March 2015, The Widening Gyre entered the Billboard Top Ten World Music Albums Charts at No. 5 (its peak position ever) and hold No. 5 for six consecutive weeks.

== Track listing ==
1. "Maggie's Pancakes/Píobaire an Chéide/The Friel Deal (Reels)" – 3:35 (with Alison Brown, Stuart Duncan, Todd Phillips, Jim Higgins & Kenny Malone)
2. "No Ash Will Burn" (song) – 3:21 (with Kenny Malone, Bruce Molsky, Garry West & Jeneé Fleenor)
3. "Buffalo Gals/Leather Britches/Leslie's Reel" – 3:55 (with Darol Anger, Alison Brown)
4. "Má Théann Tú 'un Aonaigh" (amhrán/song) – 2:39 (with Alison Brown, Natalie Haas & Jim Higgins)
5. "A Tune for Mairéad and Anna Ní Mhaonaigh" (slow tune) – 3:51 (with Stuart Duncan & Natalie Haas)
6. "White Birds" (song) – 4:40 (with Will Barrow & Mary Chapin Carpenter)
7. "The Tin Key/Sam Kelly's Jig/The Gravediggers (Jigs)" – 3:23
8. "Cúirt Robin Finley" (amhrán/song) – 4:16 (with Darol Anger & Natalie Haas)
9. "The House Carpenter (Gypsy Davy)" (song) – 4:33
10. "Samhradh (Slow Reel)/Aniar Aduaidh (Jig)/The Donegal Jig" (slow reel/jigs) – 6:11 (with Alison Brown)
11. "Lurgy Streams" (song) – 4:01
12. "The Triple T" (a.k.a. "Thomas Tourish's Tune" a.k.a. "Thomasino") – 5:50 (with Darol Anger, Alison Brown, Sam Bush, Jerry Douglas)
13. "Far Beyond Carrickfinn" (song) – 3:48 (with Eddi Reader)
14. "The Road Home" (slow house) – 4:56 (with Darol Anger)

== Personnel ==
=== Altan ===
- Mairéad Ní Mhaonaigh – fiddle, vocals
- Ciarán Tourish – Fiddle, whistle, backing vocals
- Martin Tourish – accordion
- Ciarán Curran – bouzouki, mandolin
- Mark Kelly – guitar, bouzouki, backing vocals
- Dáithí Sproule – guitar, backing vocals

=== Guest musicians ===
- Eddi Reader – vocals
- Mary Chapin Carpenter – vocals
- Jenee Fleenor – backing vocals
- Julee Glaub Weems – backing vocals
- Bruce Molsky – fiddle, vocals
- Darol Anger – fiddle
- Todd Phillips – fiddle
- Stuart Duncan – fiddle
- Natalie Haas – cello
- Bryan Sutton – guitar
- Alison Brown – banjo
- Sam Bush – mandolin
- Tim O'Brien – mandolin, backing vocals
- Jerry Douglas – dobro
- Mike McGoldrick – flute
- Garry West – bass
- Will Barrow – piano
- Jim Higgins – bodhrán
- Kenny Malone – percussion

=== Production ===
- Garry West – producer
- Altan – producers
- Sean Sullivan – sound engineer

== Track notes ==
These track notes are from the album liner notes posted on 31 January 2015 on their website by Altan in anticipation to the release of the album.

1. "Maggie's Pancakes/Píobaire an Chéide/The Friel Deal (Reels)"

- "Maggie's Pancakes" is a Scottish tune composed by fiddler Stuart Morison, once a member of the Tannahill Weavers. The Maggie in the title is Maggie Moore, who makes, apparently, really nice pancakes. This version was learned from the wonderful fiddling of Catriona MacDonald, Alasdair Fraser and all the students at the Valley of the Moon Fiddle School in California.
- "Píobaire an Chéide" is yet another setting of this fine Donegal reel which came from the playing of the great Donegal fiddle player, John Doherty.
- "The Friel Deal" is a reel composed by Mairéad Ní Mhaonaigh for the musical Friel family: Clare, Anna, Síle, John and Sheila Friel of Doire na Mainseár and Fanad in County Donegal and Glasgow.

2. "No Ash Will Burn" (song)

- A popular old timey song from the pen of Walt Aldridge. We heard it first from the beautiful singing of Carol Elizabeth Jones on the Renegades CD. This song came together in the studio during the recording session in Nashville and we got our friend Bruce Molsky to sing a verse and play his fiddle on it. Jenee Fleenor added some glorious backing vocals.

3. "Buffalo Gals/Leather Britches(Lord McDonald's Reel)/Leslie's Reel"

- Darol Anger, Todd Phillips, Alison Brown and ourselves were casually playing tunes in the studio when we came up with this selection. This track embodies the idea of this album: how the tunes travelled across the Atlantic to the Appalachian Mountains and how we can still find tunes which we have in common.

4. "Má Théann Tú 'un Aonaigh" (amhrán/song)

- A song (in Gaelic) of sound advice for a young man heading off into the world. It advises him to put his best foot forward in whatever his endeavours may be: whether going to the fair with his sheep or taking his loved one out, to concentrate fully on his actions and manners! This melody is from a field recording of Róise na nAmhrán of Arranmore Island of the Northwest coast of Donegal, recorded in the 1950s. Róise na nAmhrán is a nickname of the singer which means "Rose of the Songs". As Róise Bean Mhic Grianna (Mrs Rose Green), she was visited by Radio Éireann in May 1953, when she recorded some fifty songs at a single sitting. On stage on 6 March 2015 at The Barns at Wolf Trap in Vienna, Virginia Mairéad roughly translated the song's title as «Everything you do in life, do it well.»

5. "A tune For Mairéad and Anna Ní Mhaonaigh" (slow tune)

- Dáithí Sproule composed this back in the eighties for a birthday celebration in honour of Mairéad Ní Mhaonaigh and her sister, Anna Ní Mhaonaigh. He recorded it first on a CD with Liz Carroll – great to hear it here played by the whole band with lovely parts from Stuart Duncan and Natalie Haas.

6. "White Birds" (song)

- This evocative poem was written by the renowned Irish poet W. B. Yeats early in his career. He wrote it the day after the great love of his life, Maud Gonne, rejected his first marriage proposal, after expressing that she would rather be a seagull than any other bird. Yeats, feeling rejected, imagines in the poem that as gulls they could both flee and escape reality, and live together forever. Here, we have asked Mary Chapin Carpenter to share the beautiful lyrics, for which our friend Fiona Black has composed the music.

7. "The Tin Key/Sam Kelly's Jig/The Gravediggers (Jigs)"

- Three jigs composed by Mark Kelly, inspired by the Donegal fiddling tradition.

8. "Cúirt Robin Finley/Moladh Shliabh Maoineach" (amhrán/song)

- A love song in praise of a mountain in County Donegal. It is here you will find happiness, health, love and gold. In other words, a Utopia. We are still trying to find this mountain! Mairéad Ní Mhaonaigh collected this song in the 1980s from a lovely singer, Máire Rua Ní Mhaigh, who lived in an area near Ballybofey called the Croaghs, a mountainous Gaelic-speaking region.

9. "The House Carpenter (Gypsy Davy)" (song)

- Another great version of the well documented "The House Carpenter", which has travelled the Atlantic and can be found both in America and in Ireland, Scotland, England and Wales. This particular version also echoes The Raggle Taggle Gypsy and Cuach Mo Lon Dubh Buí, where the exotic traveller entices a young wife away from her husband to her dismay. Julee Glaub Weem is the source for this unusual version, and she kindly joins us here on backing vocals along with the great Tim O'Brien exchanging a verse and playing his mandolin.

10. "Samhradh (Slow Reel)/Aniar Aduaidh (Jig)/The Donegal Jig"

- Mairéad Ní Mhaonaigh composed the first slow reel "Samhradh" ("Summer" in Irish Gaelic) as she waited for the band to arrive at her house on the first day of rehearsals for this new album – a beautiful sunny day on 5 June 2014.
- The title of the jig, "Aniar Aduaidh", can mean two things: "northwest" or it can also mean to startle or to surprise someone.
- "The Donegal Jig" composed by Martin Tourish reminiscing the excitement of New Year's Eve in County Donegal.

11. "Lurgy Streams" (song)

- The "Lurgy Stream" takes its name from a river in Donegal and mentions several places in the eastern part of the county. It is quite a popular song, sung to different melodies. Although Dáithí Sproule already had two airs to it, one from his father, Robert Sproule, and the other from the great Derry singer, Kevin Mitchell, he decided to put a melody of his own to the words, and that is the version Mairéad Ní Mhaonaigh sings here.

12. "The Triple T" (a.k.a. "Thomas Tourish's Tune")

- Written by Ciarán Tourish for his son, Thomas. His older brother, Richie, came up with the title. As the record was recorded in Nashville, the tune was written with a bluegrass feel in mind. Guest soloists are Alison Brown (banjo), Jerry Douglas (dobro), Bryan Sutton (guitar), Darol Anger (fiddle), Sam Bush (mandolin) and Stuart Duncan (fiddle).

13. "Far beyond Carrickfinn" (song)

- This song was composed by Mairéad Ní Mhaonaigh's friends, Ian Smith and Enda Cullen, giving her perspective on the loss of her father, Proinsias Ó Maonaigh (Francie Mooney). On the night of his death, a shooting star overhead felt like a signal of hope, leading to the line «Stars lead the way, as your journey begins.» The wonderfully talented Eddi Reader joins us on this song. The male chorus of Altan sing Gaelic lines which Francie wrote…

«Áit shéimh gan smál—slán slán go fóill—macalla do ghlór ar feochan na gaoithe.»

«A glentle unblemished place—goodbye for now—the echo of your voice on the breath of the breeze.»

14. "The Road Home" (slow house)

- Inspired by Ireland's rugged West coast, Martin Tourish composed this piece in the Summer of 2003 on the road from Milltown Malbay to Donegal following the annual Willie Clancy Summer School.

== Live performances ==
Prior to the release of The Widening Gyre, Altan had already played live in concert (at least) one track from the new album, "The Tin Key/Sam Kelly's Jig/The Gravediggers (Jigs)", during (at least) one of their 2014 shows (i.e. their last show of 2014: on 5 December 2014 at The Great British Folk Festival in Skegness, Lincolnshire, UK).

On 22 February 2015 at West Virginia's Culture Center Theater in Charleston, West Virginia, Altan as a trio (including Mairéad Ní Mhaonaigh, Ciaran Tourish and Dáithí Sproule) performed live for the NPR Music's Mountain Stage radio show a special set of 5 tracks including "The House Carpenter (Gypsy Davy)" from the new album. This 26-minute live set was broadcast on 5 May 2015 on the web edition of the radio show.

As an example, on 25 August 2015 at the East Belfast Arts Festival, Stormont Hotel, Belfast, Northern Ireland, UK, Altan performed live no less than 10 songs (out of 14) from The Widening Gyre:

- "Maggie's Pancakes/Píobaire an Chéide/The Friel Deal (Reels)"
- "No Ash Will Burn"
- "Má Théann Tú 'un Aonaigh"
- "White Birds"
- "The Tin Key/Sam Kelly's Jig/The Gravediggers (Jigs)"
- "The House Carpenter (Gypsy Davy)"
- "Samhradh (Slow Reel)/Aniar Aduaidh (Jig)/The Donegal Jig"
- "The Triple T" (a.k.a. "Thomas Tourish's Tune")
- "Far Beyond Carrickfinn"
- "The Road Home"
