= Samuel Murray =

Samuel or Sam Murray may refer to:

== People ==
- Samuel J. Murray (1851–1915), American inventor
- Samuel Murray (sculptor) (1869–1941), American sculptor
- Sam Murray (flute maker), (c.1949-2024), Irish flute maker
- Sam Murray (tennis) (born 1987), British tennis player
- Sam Murray (rower) (born 1990), British rower
- Sam Coghlan Murray (born 1992), Irish rugby union player
- Samuel Murray (racquetball) (born 1993), Canadian racquetball player
- Sam Murray (footballer) (born 1997), Australian footballer
- Kinetic 9 (born Samuel Craig Murray), American hip-hop musician

== Fiction ==
- Sam Murray, character played by Kevin McDonald in the 2010 Canadian comedy miniseries The Kids in the Hall: Death Comes to Town
- Sam Murray, character played by Heather Peace in the 2010 British drama TV series Lip Service

== See also ==
- Murray (disambiguation)
