= Harry Bradley (musician) =

Irish flute player

Harry Bradley (born 1974 in Belfast, Northern Ireland) is an Irish flute player.

== Overview ==
He began playing tin whistle at age 12 and went on to flute in his early teens inspired by local musicians and the early recordings of Irish music made in America. He received further inspiration from local flute players such as Noel Lenaghan, Michael Clarkson, Sam Murray and Brendan O'Hare.

He has toured Europe and America both as a solo performer and teacher, and as a member of groups such as Dervish and Cran. His debut solo CD, Bad Turns and Horse-shoe Bends, was released to broad critical acclaim and was chosen as the number one traditional album of 2000 by Earle Hitchner of New York's Irish Echo.

Bradley is also a dedicated uilleann piper and has served as a member of the board of directors of Na Píobairí Uilleann (NPU), the society for uilleann pipers, where he taught the instrument.

He was elected TG4 Musician of the Year in 2014.

== Discography ==
As a solo artist

- 2000 Bad Turns and Horse-shoe Bends Outlet (PTICD 9000)
- 2002 As I Carelessly Did Stray (Phaeton SPINCD1005, 44 minutes)
- 2006 The Night Rambler’s Companion (guest musicians: Paul O'Shaughnessy (fiddle), Emmet Gill (uilleann pipes) and Mary Corcoran (piano))

As a collaborative artist

- 2003 The Tap Room Trio (trio with Jessie Smith and John Blake)
- 2005 ...Born for Sport (duo with Paul O'Shaughnessy)
- 2009 The Pleasures of Hope – Flute Music From Belfast and Beyond (duo with Michael Clarkson)
- 2013 The First of May (FOM2013) (with James Carty (fiddle), Sean Gavin (flutes) and Colm Gannon (accordion and melodeon))
- 2016 The Forest of Ornaments (collaborative composition with Dave Flynn released on the album Shadowplay – New Irish Music for Flute and Guitar FRCD006)

With Altan

- 2002 The Blue Idol
- 2012 Gleann Nimhe - The Poison Glen
