= Steve Cooney =

Australian musician

- Born: Stephen Cooney; 1953 (age 72–73); Melbourne, Victoria, Australia
- Genres: Irish music, classical music
- Occupations: Musician; composer; producer
- Instruments: Guitar, bass guitar, didgeridoo, keyboards
- Years active: 1969–present

Stephen Cooney is an Australian-Irish musician.

== Early life ==
Cooney was born in Melbourne, Victoria, Australia, where he learned to play the didgeridoo, and from the age of seventeen he played in a number of rock bands. He is of Irish ancestry.

== Career ==
Cooney moved to Ireland in the early 1980s, and since then he played, most notably the guitar, over 60 albums with Irish artists, such as the Irish band Altan, The Chieftains, Clannad and Andy Irvine. He also composes his own material and is a producer/arranger of traditional music.

In 2019, he recorded and published the album Ceol Ársa Cláirsí:Tunes of the Irish Harpers for Solo Guitar at Claddagh Records.

== Personal life ==
Cooney was married to Sinéad O'Connor from 2010 to 2011.

== Selected discography ==
With Franciscus Henri

- Lord of the Dance (1969)

With Mándu

- To the Shores of His Heaven (1974)

With Little River Band

- Little River Band (1975)

With Captain Rock

- Buried Treasure (1975)

With Seona McDowell

- Down Country Roads on Gossamer Wings (1978)

With Sixto Rodriguez

- Rodriguez Alive (1981)

With Jake Walton

- Sunlight and Shade (1983)
- Songs from the Gurdy Man - Collection (1990)

With Redgum

- Frontline (1984)

With Judy Small

- Ladies and Gems (1984)

With Antonio Breschi

- Ode to Ireland (1982)
- Tierras, Mares y Memorias (1986)

With Dermot Morgan

- Special Moments (1987)

With Geraldine MacGowan and Anne Conroy

- Winds of Change (1987)

With The Chieftains

- A Chieftains Celebration (1989)
- The Long Black Veil (1995)
- Santiago (1996)
- Water from the Well (2002)

With Sean Maguire

- Portraid (1990)

With Gerry O'Connor

- Time to Time (1991)
- Myriad (1998)

With Áine Uí Cheallaigh

- Idir Dha Chomhairle - In Two Minds (1992)

With Tommy Sands

- Beyond the Shadows (1992)
- The Heart's a Wonder (1995)

With Sharon Shannon

- Sharon Shannon (1993)

With Altan

- Island Angel (1993)
- Blackwater (1996)
- Runaway Sunday (1997)
- Another Sky (2000)
- The Blue Idol (2002)
- Local Ground (2005)
- Donegal (2024)

With Liam O'Flynn

- Out to an Other Side (1993)
- The Given Note (1995)

With Déanta

- Déanta (1993)

With Máirtín O'Connor

- Chatterbox (1993)

With Martin Hayes

- Under the Moon (1995)

With Dermot Byrne

- Dermot Byrne (1995)

With Matt Molloy

- Shadows on Stone (1996)

With Dordán

- Christmas Capers (1996)
- Celtic Aire (1999)

With Alan Kelly

- Out of the Blue (1996)

With Various Artists

- The Twentieth Anniversary Collection (1996)
- Sult - Spirit of the Music (1996)
- Celtic Christmas III (1997)
- Magic Irish Romances (1998)
- Celtic Christmas - Silver Anniversary Edition (2001)
- Beginner's Guide to Ireland (2005)

With Séamus Begley

- Meitheal (1996)

With The Cassidys

- Singing from Memory (1998)

With Kíla

- Lemonade & Buns (2000)

With Andy Irvine

- Rain on the Roof (1996)
- Way Out Yonder (2001)

With Tim O'Brien

- Two Journeys (2001)

With Pádraigín Ní Uallacháin

- An Dealg Óir (2002)
- Áilleacht (2003)
- Seven Daughters of the Sea (2024)

With Secret Garden

- Once in a Red Moon (2002)
- Earthsongs (2004)

With Sliabh Notes

- Sliabh Notes (1995)
- Gleanntán (1999)
- Along Blackwater's Banks (2002)

With Danny Doyle

- Spirit of the Gael (2002)

With Patrick Street

- Street Life (2002)

With Virgin Prunes

- ...If I Die, I Die (2004)

With Noel Hill

- The Irish Concertina Two: Teacht Aniar (2005)

With Sinéad O'Connor

- Theology (2007)

With Luka Bloom

- Sunny Sailor Boy / You Couldn't Have Come at a Better Time (2011)
- This New Morning (2012)

With Clannad

- Nádúr (2013)
