= Gleann Nimhe – The Poison Glen =

Album by Altan

Gleann Nimhe

Studio album by Altan
- Released: 28 February 2012: US; 8 March 2012: Europe / Australia; 9 March 2012: Ireland; 12 March 2012: UK
- Recorded: April 2011 – January 2012
- Studio: The Steeples Studios, Ramelton, Ireland Additional recordings: by Manus Lunny at Stiúidió na Mara, An Bhráid, Tír Chonaill, Na Rosa (The Rosses), County Donegal, Ireland by Alwyn Walker at Westlands Studios, Dublin, Ireland & by John Walker at The Villa, Savage, Minnesota, USA
- Genre: Celtic
- Length: 51:56
- Label: Compass Records (US) Keltia (France)
- Producer: Mairéad Ní Mhaonaigh & Altan

Altan chronology
25th Anniversary Celebration (2010)	Gleann Nimhe (2012)	The Widening Gyre (2015)

Professional ratings
Review scores
Source	Rating
PopMatters	6/10 medals

Gleann Nimhe – The Poison Glen is the eleventh studio album by Irish folk music group Altan and their tenth studio album of original material, released in late February / early March 2012 on the Compass Records label.

== Background ==
This is the first studio album of original material to be released by Altan in since the release of Local Ground on 1 March 2005.

== Title ==
Gleann Nimhe, or the Poisoned Glen, is the Irish name of a glen located near Dún Lúiche, in County Donegal in Ireland. In English, Gleann Nimhe means "The Heavenly Glen" or "The Poison Glen" (also written "The Poisoned Glen").

== Music ==
The album features An Ghealóg, a song composed by Martin Tourish who would later join the band replacing Dermot Byrne, temporarily starting from the extensive Fall 2013 (mostly) German tour and permanently since Dermot Byrne's departure from the band in early 2014.

== Critical reception ==
On 22 April 2012, Gleann Nimhe – The Poison Glen received a six-star album review (out of 10) from PopMatters's music critic John L. Murphy, stating: "Shifting somewhat away from its Narada-label leanings of a decade back into New Age-inflected stylings, this Compass Records release offers a more traditional delivery of tunes, reliable in their familiar conjuring of their Northwestern Irish heritage. At its best, this recalls their standout albums originally released in America on the Green Linnet Records label."

On 16 December 2015, "Beyond Tunes" blog critic Eros Faulk made the tune "Tommy Potts' Slip Jig" one of his three "tracks of the month December 2015" (out of the blog's seven "tracks of the month"), stating: "One of the greatest Donegal groups strikes again with this exceptional track. It’s only one tune, yet they make it quite interesting. The third time through in the second part, Dermot Byrne (accordion) does backup, and it carries into the next time. Then fiddlers Mairéad Ní Mhaonaigh and Ciaran Tourish do a wonderful fiddle harmony/backup before going back to melody and ending this tune, all the way the wonderful accompanists doing amazing backup."

== Track listing ==
1. "A Fig for a Kiss/The Turf Cutter" – 2.47 (Slip Jigs)
2. "Seolta Geala" – 3.59 (Song)
3. "The Ardara Girls/The Backdoor Highlands/Fáscadh Mo Léine (The Wringing of my Shirt)/Reel in A/Ciarán Tourish's Reel" – 6.05 (Highlands and Reels) (sometimes called "The Ardara Set")
4. "An Ghealóg" – 4.57 (Song)
5. "Caitlín Triall" – 3.22 (Song)
6. "The New Rigged Ship/Eddie Curran's/The Monaghan Twig/Kitty the Hare" – 4.27 (Reels)
7. "The Blackest Crow" – 4.50 (Song)
8. "The Lancers Jig/The Further in the Deeper" – 3.11 (Also known as "John Doherty's Jigs" (Note: As these jigs are from the playing of John Doherty, according to Mairéad Ní Mhaonaigh who introduced this track that way on stage during a concert on 15 May 2012 in Lyon, France.))
9. "The Lily of the West" – 4.33 (Song)
10. "The Wheels of the World" – 4.03 (Reel)
11. "Cailín Deas Crúite na mBó" – 4.23 (Song)
12. "Tommy Potts' Slip Jig" – 2.48
13. "The House at the Corner" – 2.31 (Tune)

See tune identifications for this album at irishtune.info.

== Personnel ==
=== Altan ===
- Mairéad Ní Mhaonaigh – Fiddle, Vocals
- Ciarán Tourish – Fiddle, Whistle, Backing vocals
- Dermot Byrne – Accordion
- Ciarán Curran – Bouzouki, Mandolin
- Mark Kelly – Guitar, Bouzouki, Backing Vocals
- Dáithí Sproule – Guitar, Backing Vocals

=== Guest musicians ===
- Jim Higgins – Bodhrán (on tracks No. 1, #4, No. 6, #8 and #10), Snare Drum (on track #9), Percussion (on tracks No. 10 & #12)
- Harry Bradley – Flute (on tracks No. 1, #4, No. 6 and #13)

=== Production ===
- Mairéad Ní Mhaonaigh – producer, mixing (except track 1)
- Altan – producers, mixing (except track 1)
- Billy Robertson – recording, mixing (track 1)
- Manus Lunny – recording (Stiúidió na Mara ("Seafront Studio"), An Bhráid, Na Rosa, Co. Dhún na nGall (Donegal), Ireland)
- Alwyn Walker – recording (Westlands Studios, Dublin, Ireland), mixing (track 1)
- John Walker recording (The Villa, Savage, Minnesota, United States)
- Ciarán Tourish – mixing
- Terry McGinty – mastering (Valley Studios, Ballybofey, County Donegal)
- Édaín O'Donnell – sleeve design

All tracks traditional, arranged by Altan except:

- "The Turf Cutter" – composed by Paddy O'Brien (of Daingean, County Offaly, and Saint Paul, Minnesota, in honor of his late father Christy O'Brien)
- "Seolta Geala" (a sea shanty) – translated by Proinsias Ó Maonaigh (Francie Mooney, Mairéad's late father)
- "Ciarán Tourish's Reel" – composed by (late Cape Breton fiddler) Jerry Holland and Dougie McDonald
- "An Ghealóg" – composed by Martin Tourish
- "The Blackest Crow" – melody by (American musician) Pete Sutherland, words traditional
- "Tommy Potts' Slip Jig" – composed by Tommy Potts
- "The House at the Corner" – composed by Dáithí Sproule

== Live performances ==
Altan played live in concert the following tracks:

- "A Fig for a Kiss/The Turf Cutter",
- "Seolta Geala",
- "The Ardara Set",
- "An Ghealóg",
- "Caitlín Triall",
- "The New Rigged Ship/Eddie Curran's/The Monaghan Twig/Kitty the Hare",
- "The Blackest Crow" &
- "The Lancers Jig/The Further in the Deeper".
