= Robert Cinnamond =

Irish traditional singer and collector of songs

Robert Cinnamond (18 May 1884 – 3 June 1968) was an Irish traditional singer and collector of songs. He was born in Tullyballydonnell, Ballinderry, County Antrim, Ireland. Along with his siblings he attended the nearby school located at the front of St. Mary's chapel, Tullyballydonnell. He married Elizabeth Murphy in 1913 - she died in 1936 giving birth to their ninth child.

He was a founding chairman of St. Joseph's Gaelic Football club.

Due to the hundreds of songs he had in his repertoire he was interviewed several times by both BBC and RTE. He was interviewed by Seán Ó Boyle as part of the field recording venture carried out in Ireland by the BBC between 1952 and 1957. Cinnamond provided 70 songs for the field researchers. A number of these songs were featured on the BBC radio programmes As I Roved Out and Music on the Hearth and were released on the cassette You Rambling Boys of Pleasure; also as the gramophone record 12T269 by Topic Records, 1975.

One of his best known pieces was "Dobbin's Flowery Vale", which was adapted for the flute by Frankie Kennedy.

Steeleye Span used their version of his recording of "The Weaver" (Roud 3085) as the introduction and ending of their song "The Weaver and the Factory Maid" on the 1973 album Parcel of Rogues. He sang the song "The Beggerman" to the same tune.
