= Gleanntáin Ghlas' Ghaoth Dobhair =

Irish language written by Irish musician Proinsias Ó Maonaigh

"Gleanntáin Ghlas' Ghaoth Dobhair" is a song in the Irish language written by Irish musician Proinsias Ó Maonaigh (father of Mairéad Ní Mhaonaigh of Altan) about his hometown of Gaoth Dobhair (i.e. Gweedore) in County Donegal. It translates as "the green glens of Gweedore". The song is one of the well-known Irish language songs of Ireland and it can be heard in many Irish pubs around the world. The song is about immigration overseas to North America and the desire to go back home to Gweedore, Ireland as well as about a great respect and love for Gweedore, its surrounding nature, and its people.

== Renditions ==
- Altan's version of the song appears on their 1997 album Runaway Sunday.
- Irish singer Paul Brady has recorded the song on numerous occasions.
- Scottish folk group Battlefield Band popularised the song as "Paddy's Green Shamrock Shore" (which they recorded and released in 1976 on their debut album Farewell to Nova Scotia).
