= The Blue Idol =

Studio album by Altan
- Released: 26 February 2002
- Recorded: June – August 2001
- Genre: Irish traditional Folk
- Length: 49:20
- Label: Narada
- Producer: Altan

Altan chronology
Another Sky (2000)	The Blue Idol (2002)	Local Ground (2005)

Professional ratings
Review scores
Source	Rating
Allmusic	4.5/5 stars
Billboard	5/5 stars

The Blue Idol is the eighth studio album by County Donegal-based Irish traditional band Altan. It was released in February 2002 on the Narada label.

== Overview and highlights ==
The Blue Idol features an outstanding variety of traditional tunes and songs sprinkled with pieces by other musicians in the genre, as well as several tunes composed and arranged by members of the band. A number of guest artists appear on the record, including American country singer Dolly Parton, who lends her iconic vocals to great effect on the English version of "An Cailín Deas Óg" ("The Pretty Young Girl", translated by frontwoman Mairéad Ní Mhaonaigh's late father and musician Proinsias Ó Maonaigh).

Famed uilleann piper Liam O'Flynn joins the band for "Roaring Water" (composed by Altan fiddler Ciarán Tourish), a rousing, five-part jig that builds in its intensity, evoking a whitewater river before eventually spilling down a waterfall. Singer Paul Brady joins Máiread Ni Mhaonaigh on "Daily Growing", a tragic Scottish tale of a nobleman's 24-year-old daughter being married to a 12-year-old son of a fellow wealthy aristocrat; eventually, with his "daily growing", the two fall in love.

The album was mixed and engineered by nine-time Grammy Award-winner Gary Paczosa.

== Critical reception ==
The Blue Idol received an enthusiastic review from Billboard, describing it as "a work of genius" and as "a triumph for Altan and a reminder of the endless charm of Irish music".

== Track listing ==
1. Daily Growing — 4:53 [featuring Dónal Lunny & Paul Brady; also known as "The Trees They Grow High"]
2. Uncle Rat – 2:18
3. Roaring Water [jig; composed by Ciarán Tourish] – 3:15
4. The Pretty Young Girl [feat. Dolly Parton] – 4:39
5. The Blue Idol (Frankie Kennedy's, The Blue Idol, The Butcher's March) [jigs; ft. Harry Bradley] – 3:05
6. The Trip to Cullenstown (The Gatehouse Maid, The Ashplant, The Trip to Cullenstown) [reels] – 3:52
7. Cuach Mo Lon Dubh Buí [song; music by Máiread Ni Mhaonaigh] – 3:02
8. Mother's Delight (Mother's Delight, The Donegal Traveler, Ormond Sound [by Paddy O'Brien], Mike Hoban's [by Mike Hoban]—also called "The Well-Bred Foal") [reels; ft. Harry Bradley] – 4:22
9. The Low Highland (The Low Highland, Moneymusk, Duncan Davidson's, The Wild Irishman—also called "The Glenties") [highlands & reel] – 3:39
10. The Sea-Apprentice Boy [song] – 3:50
11. Sláinte Theilinn (A Health to Teelin) [slow air; by Máiread Ni Mhaonaigh] – 4:00
12. An Cailín Deas Óg [song] – 4:40
13. Gweebarra Bridge (Comb Your Hair and Curl It, Gweebarra Bridge—also known as "Killarney Boys of Pleasure") [slip jig & reel] – 3:45

Find additional information and tune identifications for this album at irishtune.info and thesession.org, with notation for much of the album transcribed and available at the latter.

== Live performances ==
Altan has performed much of the album at various points throughout their years of touring, including:

- "Uncle Rat"
- "The Pretty Young Girl"
- "The Blue Idol"
- "An Cailín Deas Óg"
- "Gweebarra Bridge".

== Personnel ==
=== Altan ===
- Mairéad Ní Mhaonaigh – Fiddle, vocals
- Ciarán Tourish – Fiddle, whistle, backing vocals
- Ciarán Curran – Bouzouki, mandolin
- Mark Kelly – Guitar, bouzouki, backing vocals
- Dermot Byrne – Button accordion
- Dáithí Sproule – Guitar, backing vocals

=== Guest musicians ===
- James Blennerhassett – Bass (track 1, 2)
- Paul Brady – Vocals (track 1)
- Harry Bradley – Flute (track 5, 8)
- Richie Buckley - Saxophone (track 7)
- Steve Cooney – Bass guitar (track 11)
- Jim Higgins – Bodhrán (tracks 1–3, 5, 6, 8, 9, 11, 13)
- Dónal Lunny – Bouzouki (tracks 1, 4, 11, 12), keyboards (track 1)
- Neil Martin – Cello (track 11)
- Anna Ní Mhaonaigh
- Liam O'Flynn – Uilleann pipes (track 3)
- Dolly Parton – Vocals (track 4)

=== Production ===
- Gary Paczosa – Engineer
- Alistair McMillan – Assistant engineer
- Amelia Stein – Band photography
- Shaughn McGrath/Four 5 One Design – Design
