= Another Sky (album) =

2000 studio album by Altan

Studio album by Altan
- Released: 29 February 2000
- Genre: Irish Traditional; Folk
- Length: 49:32
- Label: Narada
- Producer: Altan

Altan chronology
Runaway Sunday (1997)	Another Sky (2000)	The Blue Idol (2002)

Professional ratings
Review scores
Source	Rating
Allmusic	(Note: Allmusic errenously refers to 'Maircad Ni Mhaonaigh ' as the lead singer/violinist; they are mistaken and may have misspelled actual bandmember Mairéad Ní Mhaonaigh's name. This is the case with many Allmusic reviews of Altan's music - other errenous 'variants' include 'Maighread Ní Dhomhnaill' [a wholly different person], 'Maighread Ní Mhaonaigh' and 'Maighread'.)

Another Sky is the seventh studio album by Irish traditional band Altan. It was released in February 2000 on the Narada Productions label.

== Overview ==
The album title "Another Sky" derives from a line in Steve Cooney's song "Island Girl", which Mairéad Ní Mhaonaigh sings on the album with Cooney himself as accompanist. This album is a slight departure from previous Altan albums, in that there is a Bob Dylan song. The album also features the Scots language song, "Green Grow The Rushes" by Robert Burns. A video was released for the Irish track "Beidh Aonach Amárach".

Another Sky was also mixed by nine-time Grammy Award-winner Gary Paczosa.

== Track listing ==
1. "Beidh Aonach Amárach (There's a Fair Tomorrow)" (Trad. Irish) – 4:20
2. "Green Grow the Rushes" (Trad. arr. Robert Burns) – 3:57
3. "The King of Meenasillagh/Lamey's/The High Fiddle Reel" (Trad./Mairéad Ni Mhaonaigh) – 2:49
4. "Island Girl" (Steve Cooney) – 4:09
5. "Eoghainín Ó Ragadáin" (Trad. Irish) – 3:48
6. "Ten Thousand Miles" (Trad.) – 3:05
7. "Gusty's Frolics/Con's Slip Jig/The Pretty Young Girls of Carrick/The Humours of Whiskey" (Trad.) – 5:07
8. Girl From The North Country (Bob Dylan) – 3:28
9. The Verdant Braes of Screen (Trad.) – 3:25
10. "The Dispute at the Crossroads/Columba Ward's/ Siuns Reel" (Trad/Ciaran Tourish) – 3:18
11. "Tiocfaidh an Samhradh (Summer Will Come)" (Trad. Irish) – 3:36
12. "The Ookpik Waltz" (Trad.) – 4:47
13. "The Waves of Gola" (Mark Kelly) – 3:44

See tune identifications for this album at irishtune.info.

== Album tracks performed live ==
Altan played live in concert the following tracks:

- "Green Grow the Rushes"
- "Eoghainín Ó Ragadáin"
- "Ten Thousand Miles"
- "Gusty's Frolics/Con's Slip Jig/The Pretty Young Girls of Carrick/The Humours of Whiskey"
- "The Dispute at the Crossroads/Columba Ward's/ Siuns Reel"

== Personnel ==
=== Altan ===
- Mairéad Ní Mhaonaigh – Fiddle, Vocals
- Ciaran Tourish – Fiddle, whistle, backing vocals
- Dermot Byrne – Accordion
- Ciarán Curran – Bouzouki
- Mark Kelly – Guitar, backing vocals
- Dáithí Sproule – Guitar, backing vocals

=== Guest musicians ===
- Steve Cooney – Bass, guitar
- Jerry Douglas – Dobro
- Jimmy Higgins – Bodhrán
- James Hutchinson (musician) - Bass
- Mick Kinsella – Harmonica
- Dónal Lunny – keyboards
- Neil Martin – Cello, keyboards
- Tríona Ní Dhomhnaill – Piano
- Mick O'Brien – Uilleann pipes
- Bonnie Raitt – Slide guitar
- String quartet:
  - Bill Butt
  - Niamh Nelson
  - Alan Smale
  - Gillian Williams

== Production ==
- Altan – Producer
- Conal Markey – Engineer
- Gary Paczosa – Mixer
- Doug Sax – Mastering
- Dave McKean – Design, illustration
- Paul McCarthy – Band Photography
- Jan Voster – Landscape Photography
