= Horse with a Heart =

Studio album by Altan
- Released: 29 May 1989
- Genre: Celtic
- Length: 45:46
- Label: Green Linnet
- Producer: Phil Cunningham

Altan chronology
Horse with a Heart (1989)	The Red Crow (1990)

Mairéad Ní Mhaonaigh and Frankie Kennedy chronology
Altan (1987)

Professional ratings
Review scores
Source	Rating
Allmusic	4/5 stars

Horse with a Heart is the first studio album by Altan, released in May 1989 on the Green Linnet Records label.

== Track listing ==
All titles arranged by Altan.

1. "The Curlew/McDermott's/Three Scones of Boxty/Unnamed Reel {= McConnell's}" – 4:11
2. "The Lass of Glenshee" – 4:38
3. "Con Cassidy's & Neil Gow's Highlands/Moll and Tiarna/Mcsweeney's Reels" – 4:27
4. "The Road to Durham" – 3:21
5. "An t-Oileán Úr" – 2:33
6. "An Grianán/Horse With a Heart" – 3:01
7. "A Bhean Udaí Thall" – 3:28
8. "Welcome Home Gráinne/Con McGinley's" – 3:18
9. "Tuirse Mo Chroí" – 4:06
10. "Come Ye by Atholl/Kitty O'Connor" – 3:11
11. "An Feochán" – 4:45
12. "Paddy's Trip to Scotland/Dinky's/The Shetland Fiddler" – 4:47

All titles are traditional, except the following:

- "An Grianán" and "Horse with a Heart" – composed by Frankie Kennedy
- "The Curlew" – composed by Josephine Keegan
- "McDermott's" – composed by Josie McDermott
- "An Feochán" – composed by Tommy Peoples
- "The Road to Durham" – composed by Armin Barnett and David Molk

See tune identifications for this album at irishtune.info.

== Personnel ==
=== Altan ===
- Mairéad Ní Mhaonaigh – Fiddle, Vocals
- Frankie Kennedy – Flute
- Paul O'Shaughnessy — Fiddle
- Ciarán Curran – Bouzouki
- Mark Kelly – Guitar

=== Guest musicians ===
- Marie Askin – Piano on "The Lass of Glenshee"
- Phil Cunningham – Keyboard, Whistle
- Dónal Lunny – Bass Bodhrán on "A Bhean Udaí Thall"
- Colm Murphy – Bodhrán
- Steve White – Percussion on "A Bhean Udaí Thall"

== Production ==
- Phil Cunningham – Producer
- Dan Fitzgerald – Engineer
- John W. Davis – Assistant Engineer
- Stephen Byram – Design
- Ross Wilson – Artwork
- Dave Harrold - Back cover photograph
