= Ceol Aduaidh =

Studio album by Mairéad Ní Mhaonaigh and Frankie Kennedy
- Released: 1983
- Studio: Windmill Lane Studios, Dublin, Ireland
- Genre: Celtic
- Length: 36:54
- Label: Gael-Linn (CEFCD32) (1983 & 2009) Green Linnet (GLCD 3090) (1994)

Mairéad Ní Mhaonaigh and Frankie Kennedy chronology
Ceol Aduaidh (1983)	Altan (1987)

Remastered cover (2009)

Professional ratings
Review scores
Source	Rating
Allmusic	3/5 stars
Trad' Mag	4/4 stars

Ceol Aduaidh (Irish Gaelic for "Music from the North") is the first studio album by Frankie Kennedy and Mairéad Ní Mhaonaigh (who would go on to found the Irish band Altan), originally released in 1983 on the Gael-Linn Records label. It was reissued in 1994 by Green Linnet Records and a remastered edition was issued in 2009 by Gael-Linn.

== Critical reception ==
In the January–February 2010 issue of (French magazine) Trad' Mag, on the occasion of the album re-release by the Gael-Linn label, folk critic Philippe Cousin awarded Ceol Aduaidh full marks (giving the album a "Bravo!!!" award), calling it a «recording that is a historical milestone in the early 1980s presaging the beginnings of Altan» and stating: "On the fully remastered Ceol Aduaidh, fiddler and singer Mairéad Ní Mhaonaigh and flutist Frankie Kennedy perform some of the typical Donegal dances such as Mazurkas ("Shoe the Donkey"), Highlands and Germans along with the inevitable Jigs and Reels. Mairéad Ní Mhaonaigh put her superb soprano voice on four songs from the North such as "An Spealadóir" which evokes the hard seasonal work in Scotland to whom the Donegal people were compelled."

== Track listing ==
1. "Rílleanna" – 1:59 [Reels]
2. "Mazurkas Phroinsias Uí Mhaonaigh" – 2:12 [Mazurkas]
3. "Iníon a' Bhaoghailligh" – 3:29 [Song/Amhran#1]
4. "Poirt: Con Ó Casaide, Pilleadh Wellington" – 2:06 [Tune/Jig]
5. "Méiltí Cheann Dubhrann (Fonn Mall) [Slow air] / Cloch na Ceithre Mhíle (Ril)" [Reel] – 4:15
6. "Thíos i dTeach a' Tórraimh" – 3:02 [Song/Amhran#2]
7. "An Cruach fraoch, Ríl Sheáin Mhosaí" – 1:48 [Reels]
8. "Poirt: An Peata sa Chistineach, Poirt: An Fathach Éireannach, Poirt: Atholl Highlanders" – 4:08
9. "Germans" – 3:59 [Germans]
10. "An Spealadóir" – 1:52 [Song/Amhran#3]
11. "Ríleanna Tommy Peoples" – 2:14 [Reels]
12. "Shoe the Donkey" – 1:46 [Mazurka]
13. "An Clár Bog Déil" – 3:42 [Song/Amhran#4]
14. "The Brown-Sailed Boat (Strathspey) / The Maids of Tullyknockbrine (Ril)" [Reel] – 1:39

All tracks are traditionals arranged by Frankie Kennedy and Mairéad Ní Mhaonaigh.

== Personnel ==
Personnel per Discogs.

- Mairéad Ní Mhaonaigh – Fiddle, Vocals and arrangements
- Frankie Kennedy – Flute and arrangements
- Gearóid Ó Maonaigh (Mairéad Ní Mhaonaigh's brother) – Guitar
- Ciarán Curran – Cittern
- Fintan McManus – Bouzouki
- Eithne Ní Bhraonáin – Synthesizer (Prophet 5)
- Nicky Ryan – producer
- Brian Masterson – engineer
- Michael Ellis – mastering
- Bill Doyle – photography
