= Runaway Sunday =

Studio album by Altan
- Released: 25 July 1997
- Recorded: September 1996 – March 1997
- Genre: Celtic
- Length: 46:32
- Label: Virgin
- Producer: Altan and Alastair McMillan

Altan chronology
Blackwater (1996)	Runaway Sunday (1997)	Another Sky (2000)

Professional ratings
Review scores
Source	Rating
Allmusic	2.5/5 stars

Runaway Sunday is the sixth studio album by Altan, released in July 1997 on the Virgin Records label.

== Track listing ==
All titles arranged by Altan.

1. "Súil Ghorm" – 2:45
2. "John Doherty's Reels" – 2:35
3. "Caidé Sin Don Té Sin?" – 3:13
4. "Germans" – 3:13 (barn dances)
5. "Clan Ranald/J.B.'s Reel/Paddy Mac's Reel/Kitty Sheáin's" – 4:17
6. "I Wish My Love Was a Red Red Rose" – 3:50
7. "Mazurka" – 2:29
8. "Australian Waters" – 3:27
9. "A Moment in Time" – 3:17
10. "Ciarán's Capers" – 3:29
11. "Cití Ní Eadhra" – 3:06
12. "Flood on the Holm/Scots Mary/The Dancer's Denial" – 3:52
13. "Gleanntáin Ghlas' Ghaoth Dobhair" – 3:27
14. "Time Has Passed" – 3:32

All titles are traditional, with the following exceptions:

- "Súil Ghorm" – composed by Mairéad Ní Mhaonaigh
- "Time has passed" – composed by Mairéad Ní Mhaonaigh
- "A Moment in Time" – composed by Mairéad Ní Mhaonaigh and Mark Kelly
- "The Dancer's Denial" – composed by Mark Kelly
- "Paddy Mac's Reel" – composed by Ciaran Tourish
- "Gleanntáin Ghlas' Ghaoth Dobhair" – lyrics by Proinsias Ó Maonaigh

== Live recordings ==
A live recording of "John Doherty's Reels" performed by Altan in early August 2002 at the Cambridge Folk Festival is available on the Cool as Folk 2-CD collective album. Released in 2007, this compilation includes a total of 36 live recordings from the Cambridge Folk Festival between 1999 and 2006.

== Personnel ==
=== Altan ===
- Mairéad Ní Mhaonaigh – Fiddle, vocals
- Ciaran Tourish – Fiddle, whistle, backing vocals
- Dermot Byrne – Accordion, melodeon
- Ciarán Curran – Bouzouki, bouzarre, mandolin, backing vocals
- Mark Kelly – Guitar, bouzouki, backing vocals
- Dáithí Sproule – Guitar, backing vocals

=== Guest musicians ===
- Stephen Cooney – Double Bass, didgeridoo
- Pat Crowley – Piano
- Jerry Douglas – Dobro
- Jimmy Higgins – Percussion
- Alison Krauss – Backing vocals
- Dónal Lunny – Keyboards, bodhrán
- Neil Martin – Cello, keyboards
- Matt Molloy – Flute

=== Production ===
- Altan – producers
- Alastair McMillan – producer, engineer
- Conan Doyle – assistant engineer
- Brian Masterson – mixer
- Dave McKean – photography, design
