= Altan (album) =

Studio album by Mairéad Ní Mhaonaigh and Frankie Kennedy
- Released: 1987
- Genre: Celtic
- Length: 40:58
- Label: Green Linnet
- Producer: Dónal Lunny

Mairéad Ní Mhaonaigh and Frankie Kennedy chronology
Ceol Aduaidh (1983)	Altan (1987)

Altan chronology
Altan (1987)	Horse with a Heart (1989)

Professional ratings
Review scores
Source	Rating
Allmusic	3/5 stars

Altan is the second (studio) album by Frankie Kennedy and Mairéad Ní Mhaonaigh (future founders of the Irish band Altan), originally released in 1987 by Green Linnet Records. The musicians appearing on this album are substantially those that became the early incarnation of the band Altan. The band later (retroactively) called Altan their debut album.

== Track listing ==
1. "The Highlandman/The Cliffs of Glencolumbkille/Old Cuffe Street" – 3:12
2. "An tSeanchailleach Gallda/Dermot Byrne's" – 3:04
3. "Tá Mo Cleamhnas a Dhéanamh" – 5:15
4. "The Cat That Ate The Candle/Over the Water to Bessie" – 3:10
5. "Ceol A'Phíobaire" – 3:50
6. "Tommy Peoples'/Loch Altan/Danny Meehan's" – 3:28
7. "Rogha an Ghabha/Charlie O'Donnell's" – 2:40
8. "The Sunset" – 3:38
9. "Thug Mé Rúide" – 4:25
10. "Humours of Whiskey/The Fairy Jig/Humours of Whiskey" – 3:18
11. "Jimmy Lyons'/Leslie's Reel" – 2:21
12. "Cití na gCumann" – 3:57
13. "Con Cassidy's Highland/Neilly O'Boyle's Highland & Reel" – 3:05

== Credits ==
Tracks 1,2,5,6,7,9,11,12,13 arranged by Kennedy, Ní Mhaonaigh, Kelly, Curran.
Tracks 3,4,8,10 arranged by Kennedy, Ní Mhaonaigh, Kelly, Curran, Lunny.

All tracks are traditionals, except the following:

- "The Sunset" – composed by Cathal McConnell and Seamus Quinn.
- "Loch Altan" – composed by Mairéad Ní Mhaonaigh.

== Personnel ==
- Mairéad Ní Mhaonaigh – Fiddle, Vocals
- Frankie Kennedy – Flute
- Ciarán Curran – Bouzouki
- Mark Kelly – Guitar
- Dónal Lunny – Bodhrán, Keyboards
- Anna Ní Mhaonaigh – Vocals on "Ceol a'Phíobaire"

== Production ==
- Dónal Lunny – Producer, Engineer
- Lolly Kupec – Design
