= Harvest Storm =

Studio album by Altan
- Released: 15 April 1992
- Recorded: September – October 1991
- Genre: Celtic
- Length: 45:42
- Label: Green Linnet
- Producer: P.J. Curtis

Altan chronology
The Red Crow (1990)	Harvest Storm (1992)	Island Angel (1993)

Professional ratings
Review scores
Source	Rating
Allmusic	4.5/5 stars

Harvest Storm is the third studio album by Altan, released in April 1992 on the Green Linnet label.

== Track listing ==
All titles arranged by Altan.

1. "Pretty Peg/New Ships A-Sailing/The Bird's Nest/The Man From Bundoran" (reels) – 3:37
2. "Dónal Agus Mórag/The New-Rigged Ship" (song and reel) – 4:27
3. "King of the Pipers" (jig) – 3:08
4. "Séamus O'Shanahan's/Walking in Liffey Street" (jigs) – 2:33
5. "Mo Choill" (song) – 4:10
6. "The Snowy Path" (slip jig) – 2:12
7. "Drowsy Maggie/Rakish Paddy/Harvest Storm" (reels) – 2:57
8. "Sí Do Mhaimeo Í" (song) – 2:50
9. "McFarley's/Mill Na Máidí" (reels) – 2:25
10. "The Rosses Highlands" (highlands) – 2:58
11. "A Nobleman's Wedding" (song) – 6:35
12. "Bog An Lochain/Margaree Reel/The Humours of Westport" (strathspey and reels) – 3:34
13. "Dobbin's Flowery Vale" (slow air and reel) – 4:20

All titles are traditional except the following:

- "Séamus O'Shanahan's/Walking in Liffey Street" composed by Paul O'Shaughnessy
- "The Snowy Path" composed by Mark Kelly
- "Harvest Storm" composed by Frankie Kennedy and Mairéad Ní Mhaonaigh

"Mo Choill" ("My Love") is a song from a lady called "Rose of the songs" who had so many songs that she was known all over Ireland by a lot of people. It's a sad song about a man who goes off to sea and leaves his beloved one behind.

== Live recordings ==
A live recording of the medley "Drowsie Maggie" performed by Altan in 1999 at the Cambridge Folk Festival is available on the Cambridge Folk Festival - A Celebration of Roots Music 1998-99 1-CD collective album. Released in 2000, this compilation includes a total of 17 live recordings from the Cambridge Folk Festivals 1998 & 1999.

== Personnel ==
=== Altan ===
- Mairéad Ní Mhaonaigh – Fiddle, vocals
- Frankie Kennedy – Flute, whistle, backing vocals
- Ciarán Tourish – Fiddle, whistle, backing vocals
- Paul O'Shaughnessy – Fiddle
- Ciarán Curran – Bouzouki, bouzouki-guitar
- Mark Kelly – Guitar, backing vocals
- Dáithí Sproule – Guitar on "The Rosses Highlands", backing vocals

=== Guest musicians ===
- Frieda Gray – Dancing on "Mill na Máidí"
- Tommy Hayes – Bodhrán, bass bodhrán, percussion, jaw harp
- Dónal Lunny – Keyboards, bass bodhrán on "Dónal Agus Mórag"
- Liam Ó Maonlaí – Didgeridoo on "Sí Do Mhaimeo Í"

== Production ==
- P.J. Curtis – Producer
- Brian Masterson – Engineer
- Aidan McGovern – Assistant Engineer
- Ciaran Byrne – Assistant Engineer
- Greenberg Kingsley – Design
- Ross Wilson – Artwork
- Colm Henry – Photography
