= The Red Crow =

Studio album by Altan
- Released: 6 November 1990
- Genre: Celtic
- Length: 45:56
- Label: Green Linnet
- Producer: P.J. Curtis

Altan chronology
Horse with a Heart (1989)	The Red Crow (1990)	Harvest Storm (1992)

Professional ratings
Review scores
Source	Rating
Allmusic	3/5 stars

The Red Crow is the second studio album by Altan, released in November 1990 on the Green Linnet Records label. The title track, written by Mairéad Ní Mhaonaigh also features on her 2008 début album, Imeall.

== Critical reception ==
The Red Crow is the first of three Altan records to win the prestigious "Celtic/British Isles Album of the Year Award" from the National Association of Independent Record Distributors and Manufacturers (NAIRD).

== Track listing ==
All titles are arranged by Altan.

1. "Yellow Tinker/Lady Montgomery/The Merry Harriers" – 2:55
2. "Con Cassidy's/Dusty Millar" – 3:01
3. "The Flower of Magherally" – 4:19
4. "Brenda Stubbert's/Breen's/The Red Box" – 4:51
5. "Inis Dhún Rámha" – 3:46
6. "Jimmy Lyon's/The Teelin/The Red Crow/The Broken Bridge" – 4:42
7. "Moll Dubh A'ghleanna" – 3:31
8. "The Wedding Jig/Hiudaí Gallagher's March/James Byrne's/Mickey Doherty's/Welcome Home Grainne" – 6:45
9. "Mallaí Chroch Shlí" – 3:54
10. "Tommy Bhetty's Waltz" – 5:07
11. "The Emyvale/Ríl Gan Ainm/The Three Merry Sisters of Fate" – 3:05

All titles are traditional, except the following:

- "The Red Crow" – composed by Mairéad Ní Mhaonaigh
- "Brenda Stubbert's" – composed by Jerry Holland
- "The Red Box" – composed by Arty McGlynn

See tune identifications for this album at irishtune.info.

== Personnel ==
=== Altan ===
- Mairéad Ní Mhaonaigh – Fiddle, Vocals
- Frankie Kennedy – Flute, Vocals (backing), Whistling
- Paul O'Shaughnessy – Fiddle
- Ciarán Curran – Bouzouki, Guitar
- Mark Kelly – Guitar, Vocals (backing)

=== Guest musicians ===
- Johnny 'Ringo' McDonagh
- Marie Askin
- Dermot Byrne
- Séamus Quinn
- Garvan Gallagher
- Dónal Lunny
- Máire Bhreathnach
- Niall Toner
- P.J. Curtis

== Production ==
- P.J. Curtis – Producer
- Dan Fitzgerald – Engineer
- Pete McGrath – Assistant Engineer
- Mary McShane – Assistant Engineer
- Greenberg Kingsley – Design
- Ross Wilson – Artwork
