= Sam Murray (flute maker) =

Sam Murray was an Irish traditional flute maker from Belfast City, Ireland. He has been making traditional Irish flutes for over 40 years. He was born in Belfast, where he worked for many years up until the early 2000s, when he moved to Galway City. His instruments are popular among Irish musicians and abroad.

Murray's instruments are all made in high-grade African blackwood or Persian boxwood using sterling silver for rings and keys. He also crafts flutes with Mopane and Chacate wood. He now sells his wooden flutes with Paraic McNeela on McNeela Music's online store.

Sean Murray has been working for Murray Flutes close to 20 years, specialising in the restoration and repair of instruments, both modern and antique.

== Personal life ==
Murray was born in Sailortown, Belfast, part of which no longer exists as it was demolished in place of the M2 motorway. Sam died in Galway at the age of 74 on the 24th of April 2024. He was buried in Milltown Cemetery, Belfast on the 29th of April.
