= Altan (band) =

Irish folk music band

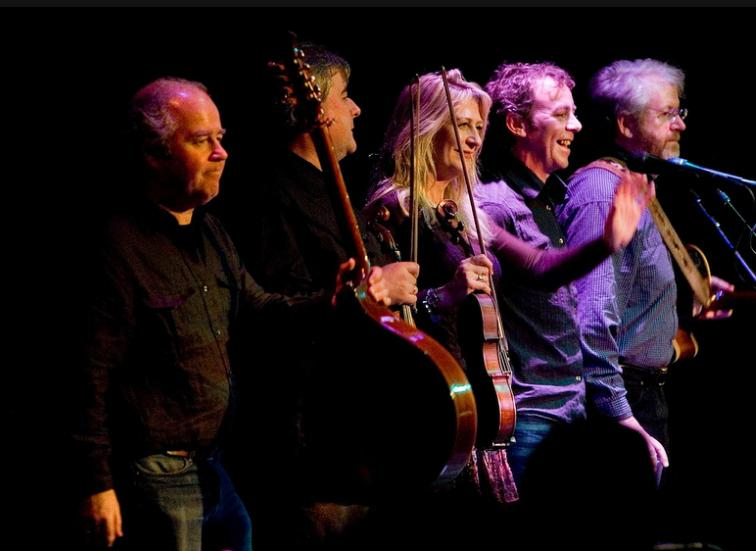
- Altan on their North America Tour in 2010: (left to right) Ciarán Curran, Ciarán Tourish, Mairéad Ní Mhaonaigh, Dermot Byrne, and Dáithí Sproule

Background information
- Origin: Gweedore, County Donegal, Ireland
- Genres: Irish traditional, folk
- Years active: 1987–present
- Labels: Green Linnet, Virgin, Narada, Compass
- Members: Mairéad Ní Mhaonaigh; Ciarán Curran; Mark Kelly; Dáithí Sproule; Martin Tourish; Clare Friel
- Past members: Frankie Kennedy; Paul O'Shaughnessy; Dermot Byrne; Ciarán Tourish
- Website: www.altan.ie

Altan are an Irish folk music band formed in County Donegal in 1987 by lead vocalist Mairéad Ní Mhaonaigh and her husband Frankie Kennedy. The group were primarily influenced by traditional Irish-language songs from Donegal and have sold over a million records.

The group were among the first traditional Irish groups to be signed to a major label when they signed with Virgin Records in 1994. The group has collaborated with Dolly Parton, Enya, the Chieftains, Bonnie Raitt, Alison Krauss, and many others.

== Origin ==
As an 18-year-old student and musician from Belfast, Frankie Kennedy used to travel to Gweedore, County Donegal, on his summer holidays, learning Irish and playing traditional Irish music on Irish flute and tin whistle. There he met native 14-year-old Irish-speaker and musician Mairéad Ní Mhaonaigh, the daughter of musician Proinsias Ó Maonaigh from Gweedore and the two fell in love with each other but Ní Mhaonaigh being very young, an innocent friendship began. When she was 15, she was allowed to go to dances under her brother Gearóid Ó Maonaigh's watchful eye, and gradually Frankie Kennedy and Mairéad Ní Mhaonaigh became a couple. They both took jobs as trainee teachers at St. Patrick's College in Dublin. In 1979, the two musicians made their recording debut as accompanists for the well-known Belfast singer and Gaelic enthusiast Albert Fry on his self-titled debut album. (In total, Ní Mhaonaigh and Kennedy would feature on the first three albums of Albert Fry.) Two years later, in 1981, Ní Mhaonaigh and Kennedy graduated from college and married when Mairéad was 21.

== History ==
=== Pre-Altan years: Ní Mhaonaigh & Kennedy ===
Kennedy and Ní Mhaonaigh had moved to Dublin and were both teaching at St. Oliver Plunkett primary school in Malahide. At the time, they were also playing music in the folk clubs around Dublin. Ní Mhaonaigh had learned the Donegal style of fiddle-playing from her father. However, Donegal music was little known outside of the county at the time. Kennedy's repertoire included a number of obscure northern flute tunes drawn from his travels in County Tyrone and County Fermanagh.

In the early 1980s, Ní Mhaonaigh formed a (short-lived) band named Ragairne with Kennedy, Gearóid Ó Maonaigh (Mairéad's brother), and a then unknown musician from Gweedore, Eithne Ní Bhraonáin, later known as Enya. People became interested in their repertoire of Donegal tunes. The group's members contributed to Mairéad and Frankie's debut album, Ceol Aduaidh (which means "Music of the North"), produced by Nicky Ryan and released in 1983 by Gael-Linn Records. The album is a collection of Gaelic songs and Ulster jigs and reels.

After the release of their first album, Kennedy and Ní Mhaonaigh were invited to America, and they quickly realised that there was a market there. They then took a career break from teaching, which ultimately became permanent.

The two started to tour with two additional members Ciarán Curran (on bouzouki) and Mark Kelly (on guitar), performing their first ever live concert as a four-member ensemble on 1 June 1985 at St. John's Church in Listowel, County Kerry, Ireland, this line-up – with no name yet – being the core of the future Altan band.

Inspired by the success of their debut effort, they began to work on a new group of ballads and jigs from the North. The result was the album Altan, released in 1987 on the Green Linnet Records label, named after a lake which sits in the shadow of Errigal near Gweedore, County Donegal. In the Irish language, altan also means 'stream'. The album features many of the musicians who would later join the band.

=== 1987–1994: Horse with a Heart, The Red Crow, Harvest Storm, Island Angel ===
Shortly after the release in 1987 of Altan, their second studio album, Ní Mhaonaigh and Kennedy named their ensemble "Altan" after the name of the album, the band's line-up remaining unchanged as a quartet including Kennedy on flute, Ní Mhaonaigh on fiddle and vocals, Ciarán Curran on bouzouki and Mark Kelly on guitar. Later on, Dublin's Paul O'Shaughnessy joined the band on fiddle, participating in the first three Green Linnet recordings (1989–1992).

In 1989, Altan released their debut album, Horse with a Heart.

In 1990, Altan released The Red Crow, which became the first of three Altan albums to win the "Celtic/British Isles Album of the Year" award from the National Association of Independent Record Distributors and Manufactures (NAIRD).

In 1992, Ciarán Tourish on fiddle & whistle and Dáithí Sproule on guitar joined the band for the Harvest Storm recording. With the arrival of Dáithí Sproule, Mark and Dáithí shared the role of guitarist, Mark touring with the band in Europe and Dáithí in the United States. In June 1992, Frankie Kennedy learned he had Ewing's sarcoma, a type of cancer that attacks bone structure. He endured surgery, radiotherapy, and chemotherapy simultaneously continuing his work with Altan.

In 1993, the band released Island Angel. Billboard cited Island Angel as the fourth-best-selling album of world music in 1994. In 1994, they were asked by US President Bill Clinton to perform at the White House on Saint Patrick's Day, and they played for him again on his visit to Ireland in 1998. Also, the President of Ireland Mary McAleese requested they accompany her on several State visits.

=== 1994–2000: Kennedy's death, major label, Blackwater, Runaway Sunday ===
While battling with cancer, Frankie Kennedy continued to steer the band to international recognition, negotiating with Virgin Records UK to sign the band. Frankie Kennedy died on 19 September 1994. After a period of mourning, the band resumed their touring as requested by Kennedy himself before he died. They became the first traditional group to be signed to a major label when they signed with Virgin Records.

Dermot Byrne, who had previously guested on accordion on two Altan recordings The Red Crow (1990) and Island Angel (1993), officially joined the band in 1994. The recording line-up became Mairéad Ní Mhaonaigh (vocals, fiddle), Ciarán Tourish (fiddle), Mark Kelly (guitar), Ciarán Curran (bouzouki), Dáithí Sproule (guitar) and Dermot Byrne (accordion) and remained unchanged until Dermot Byrne's departure in 2013.

In 1995, Green Linnet Records released Altan's first greatest-hits package titled The First Ten Years.

In April 1996, Altan released Blackwater, their first album on Virgin Records.

In July 1997, Altan released their next album, Runaway Sunday, which featured their version of "Gleanntáin Ghlas' Ghaoth Dobhair", a song written by Mairéad's father and a favourite at all their live shows.

=== 2000–2009: Another Sky, The Blue Idol, hiatus ===
In 2000, the group released Another Sky, their first album on the Narada label.

In 2002, The Blue Idol featured the vocals of American singer Dolly Parton, who became close friends with the group after she invited them to play on her 2001 album Little Sparrow. The album garnered them the award for Best Group at the BBC Radio 2 Folk Awards.

In 2002, Altan, along with other artists signed to Green Linnet such as Cherish the Ladies, sued for unpaid royalties. Most artists were paid and most claims were settled in 2006 as Compass Records (who would later sign Altan) bought the company.

In 2003, they released another greatest hits compilation CD called The Best of Altan: The Songs.

In 2005, they released Local Ground which met with positive reviews.

Altan then went on hiatus. Some members released their debut solo album: Ciarán Tourish released Down The Line (2005), Dáithí Sproule released The Crow in the Sun (2007) and Mairéad Ní Mhaonaigh released Imeall (2009).

=== 2009–2011: 25th anniversary ===
In April 2009, Mairéad Ní Mhaonaigh announced that the band would be going into the studio in early May 2009 to record a new Altan album with the RTÉ Concert Orchestra just after a show on 7 May 2009 in Pornichet, France (near Saint-Nazaire).

In July 2009, Ní Mhaonaigh announced that Altan would also release their first DVD as the video recording of a concert on 14 August 2009 in the National Concert Hall (NCH), Dublin, Ireland (again with the RTÉ Concert Orchestra).

To commemorate their 25th anniversary, Altan released 25th Anniversary Celebration, a compilation album of studio re-recordings of previous material (plus one brand new song) with the contribution of the RTÉ Concert Orchestra. It was made available in January 2010 in Japan (where it had its launch in December 2009 during Altan's Winter 2009/2010 Japanese tour), in February 2010 in Ireland and the UK and in March 2010 in North America.

After a few European dates in January, February and April 2010 and an extensive 18-date (March to April) tour of the United States, Altan launched on 23 April 2010 in Dublin, Ireland their 14-date "25th Anniversary" tour of Ireland which would run from April to June. During Summer 2010, Altan took part in a few European festivals. A 10-date tour of UK and Ireland took place in September 2010.

=== 2011–2014: Gleann Nimhe – The Poison Glen and touring ===
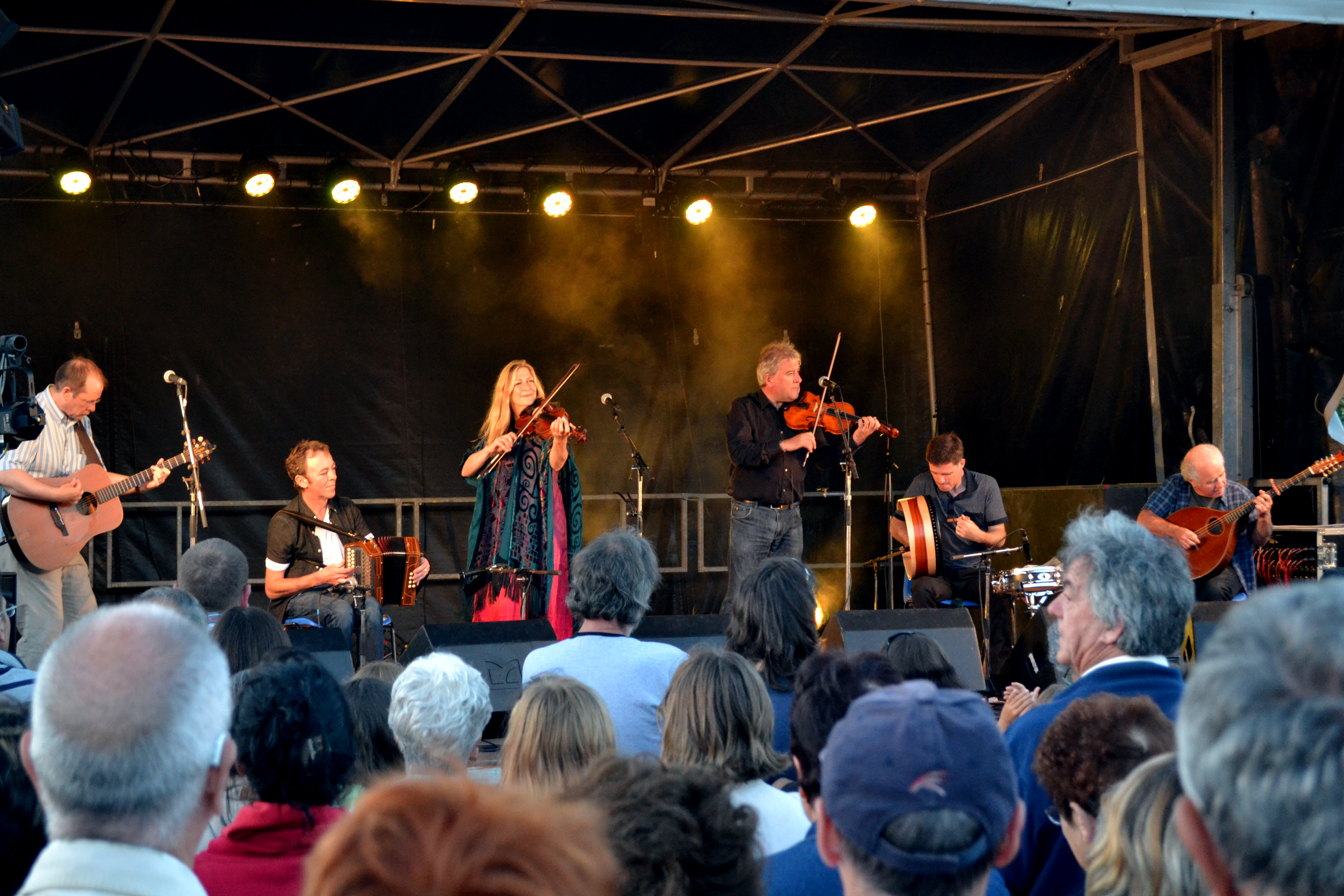
Altan in concert in Plouescat, France, in 2013

From April 2011 to January 2012, Altan recorded a new studio album titled Gleann Nimhe – The Poison Glen.

After celebrating the launch of the 18th Frankie Kennedy Winter School programme on 29 November 2011 by performing a show taking place during the Liffey Banks Sessions at The Grand Social, Dublin, Ireland, Altan celebrated the New Year 2012, then forthcoming release of their new studio album Gleann Nimhe – The Poison Glen on the occasion of their performance on 1 January 2012 at Scoil Gheimhridh Frankie Kennedy, Ionad Cois Locha, Gweedore, County Donegal, Ireland during which they played some new tracks from it.

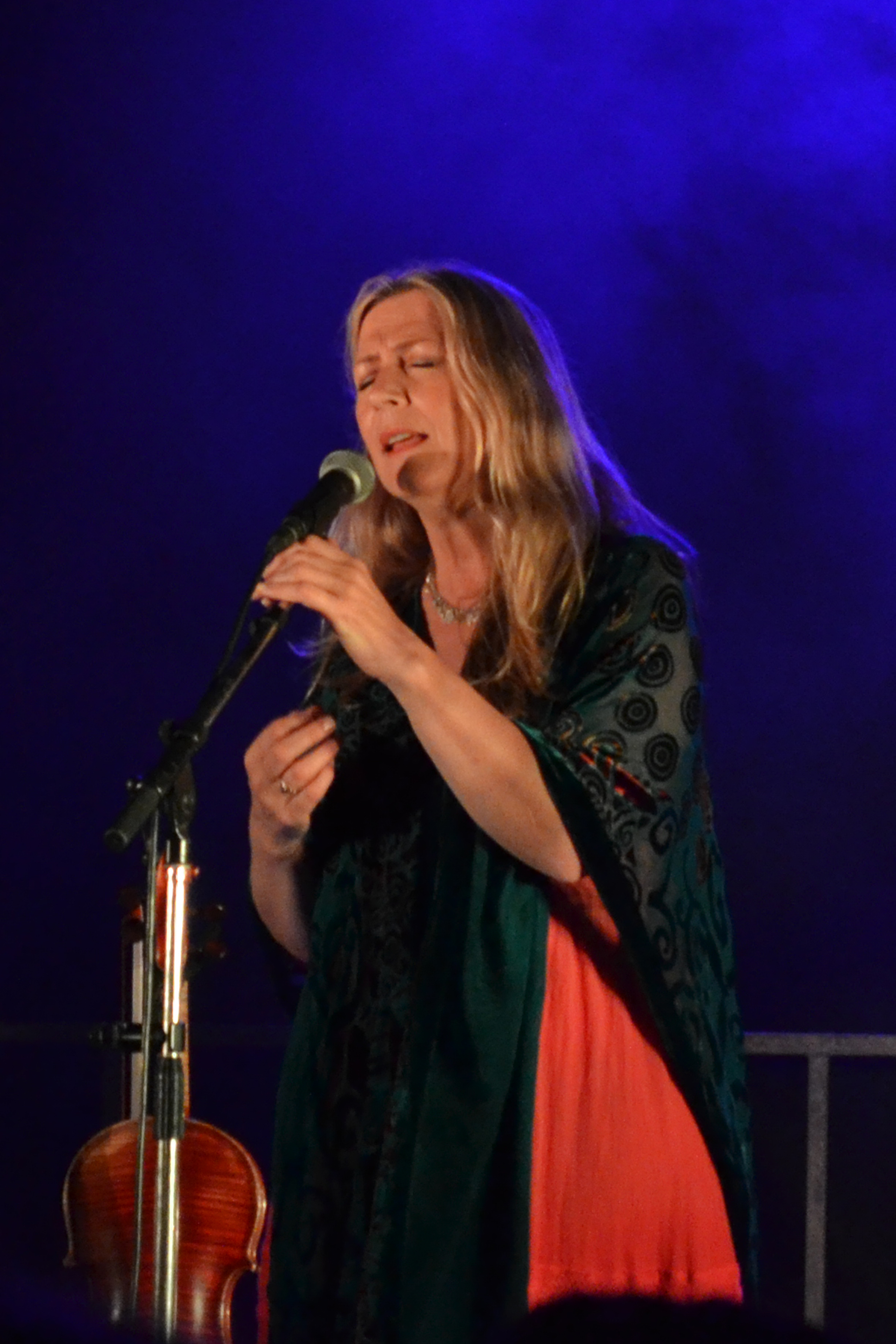
Lead singer Mairéad Ní Mhaonaigh is known for performances of Irish Gaelic songs

Exactly seven years after Local Ground, Altan released Gleann Nimhe – The Poison Glen, their new studio album of original material, on Compass Records in the US on 28 February 2012, in Europe & Australia on 8 March 2012, in Ireland on 9 March 2012 and in the UK on 12 March 2012. Started in April 2011, the recording took place in famous sound engineer & bass player Billy Robinson's Steeples Studios in Ramelton, Ireland and ended in early January 2012.

The album features An Ghealóg, a song composed by Martin Tourish who would later join the band replacing Dermot Byrne, temporarily starting from the Autumn 2013 (mostly) German tour and permanently since Dermot Byrne's departure from the band in early 2014.

=== 2014–2017: The Widening Gyre and touring ===
2014

On 3 June 2014, on their Twitter page and the Pledge Music website, Altan announced that they were working on a new studio album to be recorded in Nashville, Tennessee. The band had started rehearsing potential material for the album with the intention to perform some of these new pieces at various concerts over the summer.

While on a 5-show US tour in July–August 2014, the band – Mairéad Ní Mhaonaigh, Ciarán Tourish, Ciarán Curran, Daíthí Sproule, Mark Kelly, and Martin Tourish (replacing Dermot Byrne) – began recording their new album in Nashville, Tennessee.

In October 2014, Altan confirmed that their new album was being mixed and that they "hope[d] to have it [released] in the Spring of 2015", and that it would contain "loads of surprises".

On 5 November 2014, Altan published a snippet of a new track titled "White Birds" which was recorded with an undisclosed musical guest.

In late November 2014, Altan announced the names of some guest musicians who they collaborated with: Eddi Reader on vocals, Jerry Douglas (from Union Station and Transatlantic Sessions) on Dobro, Alison Brown, Bruce Molsky, Mike McGoldrick, Natalie Haas, Jim Higgins and Darol Anger.

On 5 December 2014, Altan took part in the Great British Folk Festival in Skegness, Lincolnshire, UK. During the show, Ciarán Tourish announced that they "have a new album almost finished [which] has been mastered" and about which they "can do any more with it [for] it's done" just before the band went into playing a new medley (taken from it) entitled "The Tin Key / Sam Kelly's Jig / The Gravediggers".

On 19 December 2014, Altan revealed the names of the final guests who had participated in the recording of the new album: Mary Chapin Carpenter, Todd Phillips, Garry West, Julee Glaub Weems, Kenny Malone and Stuart Duncan and offered (for listening and downloading) a (very) short audio excerpt (18 seconds) of one new instrumental titled "Buffalo Gals".

2015

In January 2015, Mairéad Ní Mhaonaigh explained why Altan called on Pledge Music's services in order to produce the new studio album and thanked all the pledgers for helping Altan with the fundraising campaign and for bringing it to completion (reaching, at that time, 101% of goal): "The music business is a changing world for professional musicians as ourselves. We depend more on live concerts to make our living. We can no longer depend on big record company funding to get our music out there, we have to do it ourselves. Now with your help we have funded our latest album which we are really happy with." She also stated that Altan have licensed the new album to Compass Records in the US, that Gary West of Compass co-produced it and that after 30 years recording studio albums, Altan "have taken a new approach with this one." The Altan Pledge Music pre-order page announced that all exclusive pre-orders would be fulfilled by 17 February 2015.

The band later announced that the new album would be released in Ireland on 20 February 2015, in the UK on 23 February 2015 and in the US on 24 February 2015, and would be titled The Widening Gyre, taken from "The Second Coming", a poem by W. B. Yeats, the first Irishman to be awarded the Nobel Prize for Literature in 1923. Mairéad Ní Mhaonaigh revealed the album's cover artwork, by artist friend Édaín O'Donnell, who previously designed the Gleann Nimhe – The Poison Glen cover.

On 26 January 2015, Altan's official website published a presentation of their new studio album entitled anew The Widening Gyre giving many details about the new album: the new musical direction taken by the band, the album recording process and the participation of numerous guest musicians as well as the titles of some of the new tracks. The very same day, on their "Widening Gyre" iTunes page, Altan revealed the titles of the 14 tracks from their new studio album and released them for sale.

On 27 January 2015, on their "Widening Gyre" Compass Records page, Altan made available short snippets of their new tracks.

On 22 February 2015 in Charleston, WV (at Culture Center Theater, Mountain Stage Radio), Altan embarked on a 25-date Winter/Spring North American tour which ended on 3 April 2015 in Greeley, Colorado (at the Union Colony Civic Center) visiting the Canada only twice: on 18 March 2015 in St. Albert, Alberta (at the Arden Theatre) and on 19 March 2015 in North Vancouver, BC (at the Centennial Theatre Centre).

2016

Almost a year after the beginning of their extensive 25-date Winter/Spring 2015 North American tour, Altan embarked on 19 February 2016 in Northampton, Massachusetts in another extensive North American tour (but exclusively visiting the US), their 25-date Winter/Spring 2016 US tour which ended on 25 March 2016 in Spokane, Washington. An extensive (18-date) Spring 2016 UK tour followed in April and May 2016, including one Scotland leg and two England legs from 8 April in Hindhead, Surrey to 7 May 2016 in Stornoway, Scotland, including a London show at Kings Place on 9 April 2016.

2017

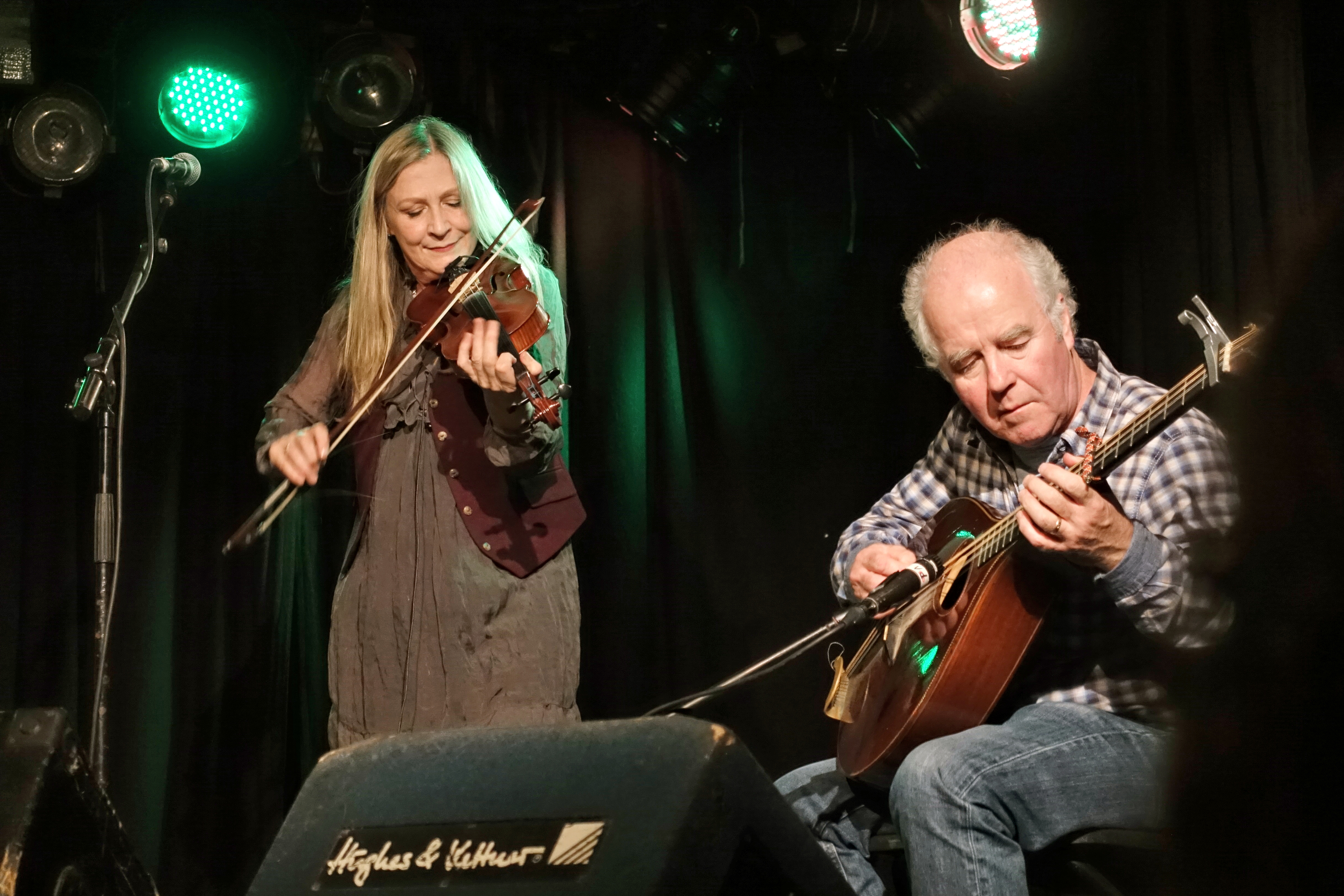
Altan in Hamburg 2017

Altan celebrated their 30th anniversary year with a Winter tour of Europe in January 2017, visiting The Netherlands, Ireland, Scotland and France within this month. (Note: The Altan 2016–2017 Winter tour of Europe should include: two Netherlands shows on 13 January in Zaandam during the Roots aan de Zaan festival and on 14 January in Oisterwijk at Cultuurcluster Tiliander, a unique show in Ireland on 28 January in Dublin at Dublin Castle, Ireland during the Temple Bar TradFest (as the special event "Trad Gala Night" along with the two other Irish bands Four Men and a Dog and Boffin to Burren), a unique show in Scotland on 30 January 2017 in Glasgow at Celtic Connections / Glasgow Royal Concert Hall & finally a unique show in France on 31 January 2017 in Rennes at the Théâtre National de Bretagne (Salle Vilar).) On this tour, the core of the band (made up of Mairéad Ní Mhaonaigh, Ciarán Curran, Ciarán Tourish, Mark Kelly, and Martin Tourish) was joined with a newcomer, John Joe Kelly on bodhrán. Altan also announced for 2017 a 17-date US winter tour in February and March 2017. (Note: The Altan 2016–2017 Winter/Spring tour is due to start on 23 February in Sellersville, Pennsylvania and to end on 21 March in Des Moines, Iowa.)

After more than 25 years as a band member (he had joined Altan in September 1991 for the Harvest Storm recording sessions), Ciarán Tourish (fiddle, backing vocals) left the band (for personal reasons) after the show Altan performed on 29 July 2017 in Lyon, France, at Les Nuits de Fourvière Festival. He was not replaced until fiddle player Clare Friel joined the band, at first as a guest musician for the Autumn 2022 and Spring 2023 US tours, then as a permanent member in July 2023.

=== 2017–2024: The Gap of Dreams and touring ===
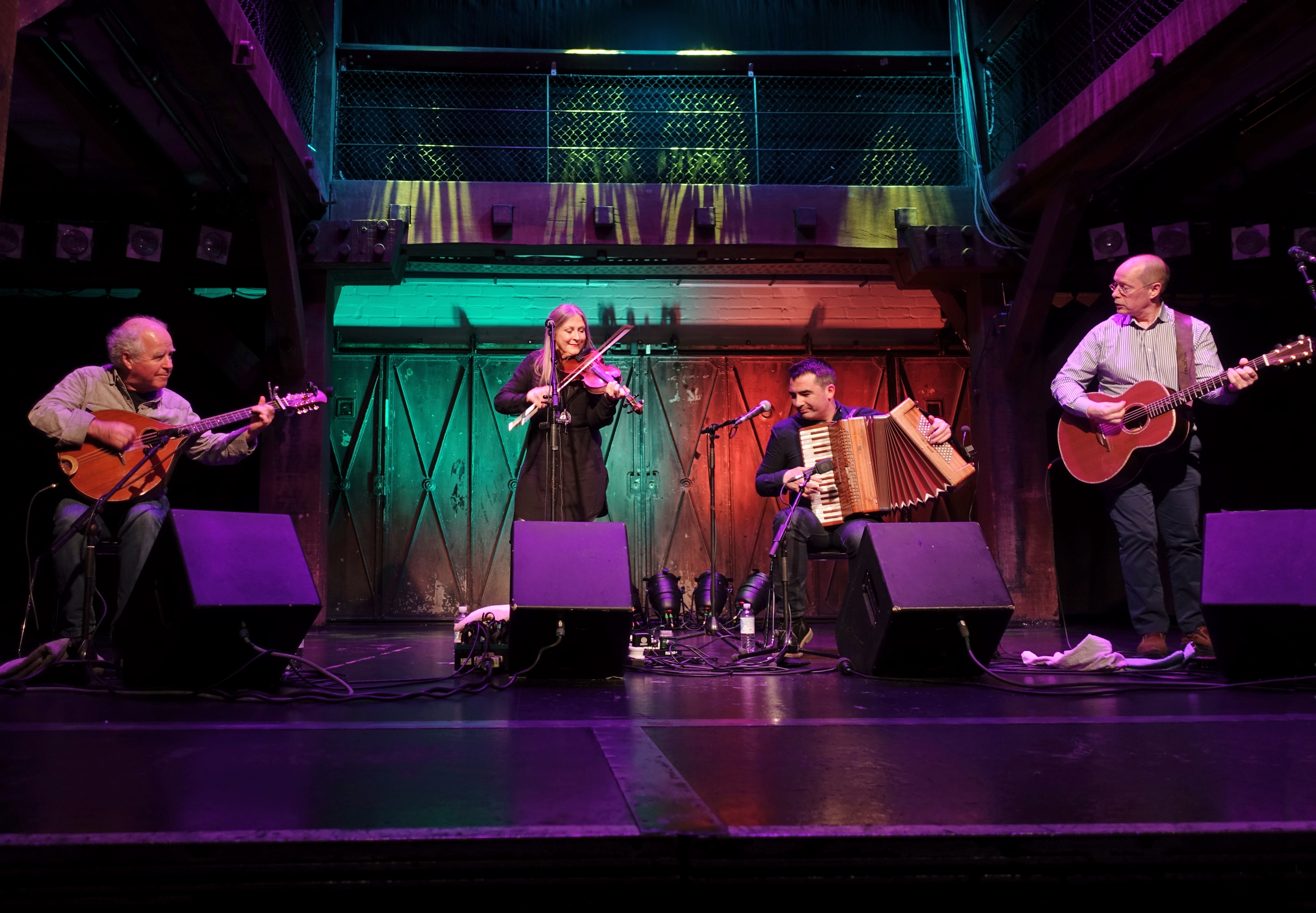
Altan in Hamburg 2019

On 23 February 2018, Altan embarked on a new (one-month) North-American tour.

On 2 March 2018, Altan released their new studio album entitled The Gap of Dreams which they had recorded in November 2017.

On 15 March 2020, Altan halted its tour due to the COVID-19 pandemic. Nevertheless, Altan performed their last two scheduled shows in Ireland on 18 April 2020 at Copper Coast TradFest in Dunhill, County Waterford and on 24 April 2020 at Club Ceol Aislann in Kilcar, County Donegal.

After a unique 2021 show on 26 November 2021 at Áislann Chill Chartha, Kilcar, Co. Donegal and their annual week residence at Scoil Gheimhridh Ghaoth Dobhair, Ghaoth Dobhair (also Co. Donegal) from 27 December 2021 to 1 January 2022, Altan resumed touring in March 2022, performing 3 shows in London (Note: A show on 13 March 2022 at London St. Patrick's Day Festival and 2 shows (with special guests) on 17 & 18 March 2022 at the Irish Cultural Centre, Hammersmith) and 3 shows in France (Note: 2 shows in Paris on 19 & 20 March 2022, respectively at Centre Culturel Irandais and Studio de l'Ermitage, and a show on 21 March 2022 at L'Illiade, Illkirch-Graffenstaden near Strasbourg, Grand Est.) this month, and another 6 shows in Ireland from March to October.

Two extensive (23-date) US Autumn and (15-date) US Spring tours ensued, respectively in October–November 2022 and March 2023 (after a unique show in Ireland on 3 February 2023 at Seamus Heaney HomePlace, Bellaghy, Magherafelt, County Londonderry). These new US dates marked Altan's first shows in the US in two and a half years (since the aborted US Spring Tour in March 2020).

Since then, Altan embarked on a 4-show tour of Ireland in the Spring and Summer of 2023 and performed 2 shows in France: on 1 April 2023 at La Coursive (scène nationale), La Rochelle, Nouvelle-Aquitaine, and with l'Orchestre National de Bretagne on 9 August 2023 at the Lorient Interceltic Festival, Lorient, Brittany.

Born in Glasgow with her family roots firmly entrenched in the Donegal Gaeltacht (Derrynamansher), fiddle player Clare Friel permanently joined Altan in July 2023. She is the first female member to join the band since Mairéad Ní Mhaonaigh since the band's start. A former Gradaim Cheoil Young Musician of the Year winner, Friel was from the Friel Sisters trio (Anna, Sheila and Clare) and from the SíFiddlers.

=== 2024–present: new album Donegal and touring ===
On 24 January 2024, Altan performed at the Glasgow Celtic Connections with the Scottish Chamber Orchestra and the Scottish fiddle female quartet RANT." A 5-date tour of Ireland ensued: starting on 26 January in Dublin at Temple Bar Tradfest, it included concerts on 1 February with the RTÉ Concert Orchestra in Kildare at the C. Kildare St. Brigid's Cathedral and on 2 February in Galway at the Town Hall Theatre. It is due to include a performance on 23 February at the Belfast Winter Tradfest and to end on 3 March 2024 in Killarney at the Gathering Traditional Irish Music Festival. Altan is due to embark on a 15-date US tour on 8 March 2024 in Sacramento at Sofia Tsakopoulos Center, due to end on 27 March 2024 in Chicago at the Old Town School of Folk Music.

On 7 February 2024, it was officially announced the upcoming release on 1 March 2024 on Compass Records of Altan's new studio album entitled Donegal. This was then their first studio album to be released in 6 years. The announcement read: "Donegal captures the essence of the region which has inspired Altan since the band's inception and further cements Altan's legacy as one of the great cultural treasures of Ireland."

== Band members ==
=== Recording line-up ===
Since the arrival of accordionist Dermot Byrne in 1994, the band recording line-up has remained unchanged until his definitive departure from the band some time in 2013 and his lasting replacement since then by Martin Tourish (Ciarán Tourish's cousin). Incidentally, Martin Tourish wrote (but didn't record) the song "An Ghealóg" from the 2012 Altan studio album Gleann Nimhe – The Poison Glen.

Since July 2023, the band recording line-up has become:

- Mairéad Ní Mhaonaigh – lead vocal, fiddle
- Ciarán Curran – bouzouki
- Mark Kelly – guitar
- Dáithí Sproule – guitar, vocals
- Martin Tourish – accordion
- Clare Friel – fiddle, viola, lead vocal

=== Touring line-up ===
Based on the recording line-up, the band touring line-up may differ at times:

- Dáithí Sproule (guitar) replaces Mark Kelly when touring with the band, mostly in the US but also in Europe (for instance during the entire 14-date Spring 2012 Norwegian tour).
- Martin Tourish on accordion has permanently replaced Dermot Byrne, starting from the extensive Autumn 2013 (mostly) German tour (from 12 to 30 November 2013) after an 8-month hiatus (starting from March 2013) during which Altan had no longer been playing with any accordionist (as Dermot Byrne had not been playing with the band since then).
- Clare Friel joined the band as a guest musician on fiddle for the Autumn 2022 and Spring 2023 US tours. She permanently joined the band in July 2023.

== Legacy ==
For almost two decades (from December 1994 to January 2014), a winter school of music called Scoil Gheimhridh Frankie Kennedy (The Frankie Kennedy Winter Music School) was held each year in Gaoth Dobhair (Gweedore), County Donegal in honour of co-founder Frankie Kennedy.

Ni Mhaonaigh is regarded as one of the great female singers of Ireland, standing alongside Mary Black, Moya Brennan and Sinéad O'Connor.

== Discography ==
=== Frankie Kennedy and Mairéad Ní Mhaonaigh albums ===
- Ceol Aduaidh (Music of the North) (1983)
- Altan (1987)

=== Altan albums ===
==== Studio albums ====
- Horse with a Heart (1989)
- The Red Crow (1990)
- Harvest Storm (1992)
- Island Angel (1993)
- Blackwater (1996)
- Runaway Sunday (1997)
- Another Sky (2000)
- The Blue Idol (2002)
- Local Ground (2005)
- 25th Anniversary Celebration (2010)
- Gleann Nimhe – The Poison Glen (2012)
- The Widening Gyre (2015)
- The Gap of Dreams (2018)
- Donegal (2024)

==== Live albums ====
- The Best of Altan (1997)

==== Compilations ====
- The First Ten Years (1986–1995) (1995)
- The Best of Altan (1997)
- Altan's Finest (2000)
- Once Again 1987–93 (2000)
- The Best of Altan: The Songs (2003)

Various artists live compilations featuring Altan

- Cambridge Folk Festival – A Celebration of Roots Music 1998–99 (2000)
- Cool as Folk (2007)
