= Dáithí Sproule =

Daithí Sproule
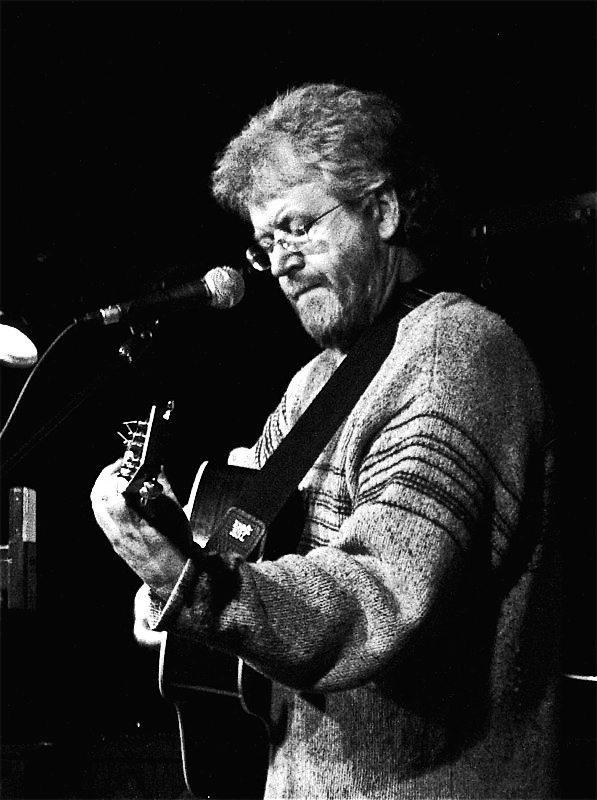
- Dáithí Sproule in concert

Background information
- Born: 23 May 1950 (age 75)
- Origin: Derry, Northern Ireland
- Genres: Irish traditional, folk
- Occupations: Singer, musician, record producer
- Years active: 1968–present

Dáithí Sproule (born 23 May 1950) is a guitarist and singer of traditional Irish music. He is the grandson of Frank Carney and uncle of singer Claire Sproule.

== Biography ==
Born and raised in Derry, Northern Ireland, at the age of 18 he moved to Dublin, where he attended university. Growing up, he listened to Bob Dylan, Bert Jansch, the Beatles, British folk songs and traditional Irish music. It was in Dublin that he entered the music scene which was prominent in Ireland at the time. As a teenager he had met the Ó Domhnaill family during trips to the Gaeltacht area of Ranafast in County Donegal, and while in Dublin they formed a band, Skara Brae, who would go on to have a great effect on Irish traditional music.

Sproule is well known as a guitarist and was one of the first guitarists to use the DADGAD guitar tuning for Irish music after the originator Davy Graham. In 1992 he joined Irish supergroup Altan with whom he sings and plays guitar. Of his use of DADGAD tuning, Sproule says, it "just seemed to instantly gel with Irish music. The nature of the tuning meant that you didn't really produce anything that was terribly, drastically, offensively wrong to people. I was always a singer, but when I started playing with instrumentalists in sessions and pubs, I was able to develop a style by just playing along with them quietly and tactfully." He was deemed "a seminal figure in Irish music" by The Rough Guide to Irish Music.

Sproule is also a member of various other bands and has recorded further solo albums; he also teaches DADGAD guitar and traditional songs at the Center for Irish Music in St. Paul, Minnesota.

== Discography ==
=== Solo albums ===
- The Crow in the Sun (2007)
- Lost River, Vol. 1 (New Folk, 2011)
- A Heart Made of Glass (1995)

=== Other bands ===
- Bright and Early (with Paddy O'Brien and Nathan Gourley - 2015 - New Folk Records)
- From Uig to Duluth (with Laura MacKenzie and Andrea Stern - 2014)
- The Pinery (with Laura MacKenzie – 2009 – New Folk Records)
- Seanchairde (with Tara Bingham and Dermy Diamond – 2008 – New Folk Records)
- Fingal (with Randal Bays and James Keane – 2008 – New Folk Records)
- Snug in the Blanket (with Jamie Gans and Paddy O'Brien – 2004)
- Overland (with Randal Bays – 2004)
- Trian II (with Liz Carroll and Billy McComiskey – 1995)
- A Thousand Farewells (with Martin and Christine Dowling – 1995)
- Trian (with Liz Carroll and Billy McComiskey – 1992)
- Stranger at the Gate (with Paddy O'Brien – 1988)
- The Iron Man (with Tommy Peoples – 1984)
- Carousel (with Seamus and Manus McGuire – 1984)
- Spring in the Air (with James Kelly and Paddy O'Brien – 1981)
- Is it Yourself? (with James Kelly and Paddy O'Brien – 1979)
- Skara Brae (Skara Brae – 1971)

=== Guest appearances ===
- Four & Eight String Favorites (Bone Tone Records) 2021 - Eric Mohring & Friends
- Merrijig Creek - Fintan Vallely
- Spinning Yarns (Two Tap Records) 2015 - Norah Rendell
- Heigh Ho, The Green Holly (New Folk Records) 2015 - Laura MacKenzie
- Minnesota Lumberjack Songs (Two Tap Records) 2011 - Brian Miller
- Side by Side (Dawros Music) 2010 - Liz and Yvonne Kane
- 40 Acre Notch (New Folk Records) 2008 – the HiBs
- The Essential Chieftains (RCA) 2006 – The Chieftains
- Blue Waltz 2004 – Julee Glaub
- Evidence (New Folk Records) 2003 – Laura MacKenzie
- Over the Water (Heart Productions) 2002 – Ross Sutter
- Little Sparrow (Sugarhill) 2001 – Dolly Parton
- Lost in the Loop (Green Linnet) 2001 – Liz Carroll
- Shine (Swallowtail) 2001 – Katie McMahon
- Persevere 2000 – The Proclaimers
- Water from the Well (RCA) 2000 – The Chieftains
- Tis the Season (Compass) 1997 – Laura MacKenzie
- Irish Women Musicians of America (Shanachie) 1995 – Cherish the Ladies
- Heartsongs (Sony) 1994 – Dolly Parton
- Mamma, Will you Buy Me a Banana? (Heart Productions) 1991 – Ross Sutter
- Blue Mesa (Red House) 1989 – Peter Ostroushko
- Liz Carroll (Green Linnet) 1988 – with Liz Carroll
- Sean O'Driscoll (Shanachie/Meadowlark) 1987 – Sean O'Driscoll
- Capel Street (Capelhouse) 1986 – James Kelly
- The Streets of My Old Neighborhood (Rounder) 1983 – Peter Ostroushko
- Sluz Duz Music (Rounder) 1982 – Peter Ostroushko

=== Compilations ===
- A Harvest Home: Center for Irish Music Live Recordings, Vol. 5 2013
- Strings Across the North Shore 2009
- Young Irish Musicians Weekend Live! 2008 – with James Kelly and Paddy O'Brien
- New Folk Records Sampler 2007 (New Folk Records) 2007
- Masters of the Irish Guitar (Shanachie) 2006
- The Independence Suite (Celtic Crossings) 2005 – with Randal Bays
- Simply Folk Sampler 3 (Wisconsin Public Radio) 2005
- Festival International des Arts Traditionnels de Québec (Folklore) 2004 – with Trian
- The Ice Palace – Irish Originals from Minnesota (IMDA) 2001
- The Last Bar – Irish Music from Minnesota (IMDA) 2000
- Alternate Tunings Guitar Collection (String Letter) 2000 – with Trian
- As They Pass Through (Kieran's) 2000
- Best of Thistle and Shamrock, Vol. 1 (Hearts of Space) 1999 – with Altan
- Celtic Colours International Festival – the Second Wave (Stephen McDonald) 1999 – with Altan
- A Winter's Tale (Universal) 1998 – with Altan
- Gaelic Roots (Kells) 1997 – with James Kelly, Paddy O'Brien and Gerry O'Connor
- Celtic Music from Mountain Stage (Blue Plate) 1997 – with Altan
- Hunger No More (Éire Arts) 1997
