= Portland (album) =

Studio album by Kevin Burke and Mícheál Ó Domhnaill
- Released: 1982
- Recorded: 1982
- Genre: Irish traditional
- Length: 34:42
- Label: Green Linnet
- Producers: Kevin Burke; Mícheál Ó Domhnaill

Portland is a studio album by Kevin Burke and Mícheál Ó Domhnaill, released in 1982 by Green Linnet Records (SIF 1041). This is the second and final album by this duo who first played together with the popular Irish traditional group The Bothy Band.

== Background ==
Mícheál Ó Domhnaill co-founded the popular Irish traditional group The Bothy Band in 1974, along with Paddy Glackin (fiddle), Matt Molloy (flute and tin whistle), Paddy Keenan (uilleann pipes and tin whistle), Dónal Lunny (bouzouki, guitar, and production), and his sister Tríona Ní Dhomhnaill (harpsichord, clavinet and vocals). Ó Domhnaill met Kevin Burke when Burke replaced Glackin in the Bothy Band in May 1976. In the five years the Bothy Band were together, they emerged as one of the most exciting groups in the history of Irish traditional music. Much of their repertoire was rooted in the traditional music of Ireland, and their enthusiasm and musical virtuosity set a standard for future Irish traditional performers. They recorded three studio albums during their brief career: The Bothy Band (1975), Old Hag You Have Killed Me (1976), and Out of the Wind – Into the Sun (1977). A live album After Hours was released in 1979, the year the group disbanded.

When the Bothy Band disbanded in 1979, Burke and Ó Domhnaill toured the United Kingdom and Europe together, and recorded a highly acclaimed album, Promenade (1979). In 1980, Burke and Ó Domhnaill moved to the United States and toured extensively throughout the country. After settling in Portland, Oregon, the two recorded this second and final album together in 1982. They continued to perform together the following year, but eventually parted ways to pursue other musical opportunities. Ó Domhnaill went on to form the popular group Nightnoise with his sister Tríona, Billy Oskay, and Brian Dunning; he lived in Portland until 1997, when he returned to Ireland. He passed away on July 7, 2006. In addition to his acclaimed solo albums, Burke went on to form the influential Celtic groups Patrick Street and the Celtic Fiddle Festival, as well as successful collaborations with Jackie Daly and Cal Scott. Burke still lives in Portland and continues to tour throughout the world.

== Production ==
Portland was recorded in Portland, Oregon in 1982. The instrumentation is restricted to Burke on fiddle, and Ó Domhnaill on vocals, guitar, and harmonium.

== Composition ==
Portland consists of nine tracks, five of which are medleys. The first track consists of three reels: "Maudabawn Chapel", was written by Ed Reavy, was learned from Martin Byrnes; "The Wild Irishman" was learned from Michael Coleman, and "The Moher Reel" was learned from Lucy Farr. "Éirigh A Shiúir" is a traditional song that Ó Domhnaill learned from his aunt Neilí, a renowned singer who had a vast repertoire of Irish and English songs. The song is bout a shepherd who invites his true love to elope with him. "Breton Gavottes" consists of three dances, the first and third of which are traditional, the second was written by Padrig Sicard. The fourth track consists of three traditional tunes: "The Rolling Waves", "The Market Town", and "Scatter the Mud"—the latter two were learned through O'Neill's Music of Ireland (1903), compiled by Francis O'Neill, an Irish-born American police officer and collector of Irish traditional music. "Aird Uí Chumhaing" is another traditional Irish song that Ó Domhnaill learned from father, Aodh Ó Domhnaill, a teacher, a singer, and a collector of traditional music for the Irish Folklore Commission. The title refers to a townland on the northeast coast of Ireland. The song is about an exile from Aird Uí Chumhaing who looks across at his native coastline from the Mull of Kintre in Scotland and dreams of finding a boat that will carry him back to his childhood home, where he longs to live out the rest of his days.

The sixth track is another medley of reels: "Paddy's Return" learned from the Tulla Céilí Band, "Willy Coleman's", written by Willy Coleman who came from County Sligo, and "Up in the Air", written by Burke and Ó Domhnaill. The seventh track also consists of three reels: "Lucy's Fling" was written by Lucy Farr, "S'iomadh Rud A Chunnaic Mi", a piece of mouth music in Scottish Gaelic, was learned from Finlay MacNeill, and "Some Say the Devil is Dead", a traditional tune. "Is Fada Liom Uaim Í" is another traditional song that Ó Domhnaill learned from his aunt Neilí. The song is about a man who complains that the woman he desires is beyond his reach. The album's ninth and final track is a medley of four tunes: "Tom Morrison's" was written by Tom Morrison, "The Beare Island Reel" was learned from Dale Russ, "George White's Favourite" was learned from Paddy Killoran, and "Dipping the Sheep" was learned from O'Neill's Music of Ireland.

== Reception ==
Professional ratings
Review scores
Source	Rating
AllMusic	4.5/5 stars

Ó Domhnaill and Burke have been called "one of the finest duets ever recorded in Irish traditional music". In contrast to the "propulsive power and bracing brinkmanship" produced by the Bothy Band, the duo set off on a different musical path that one reviewer from the Irish Echo called "soulful finesse".

Their sound was unrushed, detailed, spellbindingly beautiful, yet still pulsing with vitality. For tunes, it was the ultimate rhythmic glide, smooth rather than slick, without a hint of coasting. For songs, it was respect and reflection conveyed with absolute conviction.

Ó Domhnaill's guitar playing and Burke's Sligo-style Irish fiddling achieved a "relaxed vitality" through "compelling melodies, pulsing Sligo rhythms, intricate variations, and vocal perfection". Reviewers singled out the "tender, baring passion" of Ó Domhnaill's voice in his renditions of "Eirigh a Shiuir" and "Aird Ui Chumhaing".

He treated traditional songs in Irish as the enduring testament of history handed down by those who experienced it rather than merely documented it. His acoustic guitar playing was, like himself, unobtrusive yet intense, focused on gimmick-free impact and ever-mindful that it must support, not supplant, Burke's melodic fiddling.

In his review for AllMusic, Steve Winick called the album "another fine display" by Burke and Ó Domhnaill, giving the album four and a half out of five stars.

== Track listing ==
No.	Title	Writer(s)	Length
1.	"Maudabawn Chapel / The Wild Irishman / The Moher Reel"	Traditional	2:57
2.	"Éirigh A Shiúir"	Traditional	3:56
3.	"Breton Gavottes"	Traditional, Padrig Sicard	2:40
4.	"The Rolling Waves / The Market Town / Scatter the Mud"	Traditional	3:52
5.	"Aird Uí Chumhaing"	Traditional	3:32
6.	"Paddy's Return / Willy Coleman's / Up in the Air"	Traditional, Willy Coleman, Kevin Burke, Mícheál Ó Domhnaill	4:28
7.	"Lucy's Fling / S'iomadh Rud A Chunnaic Mi / Some Say the Devil is Dead"	Traditional, Lucy Farr	4:15
8.	"Is Fada Liom Uaim Í"	Traditional	4:10
9.	"Tom Morrison's / The Beare Island Reel / George White's Favourite / Dipping the Sheep"	Traditional, Tom Morrison	4:52
Total length:			34:42

For a detailed analysis of this album's contents see the Irishtune.info album page.

== Personnel ==
Music

- Kevin Burke – fiddle
- Mícheál Ó Domhnaill – vocals, guitar, harmonium (2,5,8)

Production

- Kevin Burke – producer
- Mícheál Ó Domhnaill – producer
- David Mathew – engineer
