= Celtic Folkweave =

Studio album by Mick Hanly and Mícheál Ó Domhnaill
- Released: 1974
- Recorded: 1974
- Studio: Eamonn Andrews Studios, Dublin
- Genre: Traditional Irish folk music
- Length: 38:20
- Label: Polydor
- Producer: Dónal Lunny

Celtic Folkweave is a studio album by Mick Hanly and Mícheál Ó Domhnaill, released in 1974 by Polydor Records. Considered a seminal album in the traditional Irish music genre, the musicians involved in the recording would go on to found some of the most innovative and important groups to perform traditional Irish music.

Recorded in Ireland in 1974, Celtic Folkweave consists of Irish, Scottish, and English ballads, sung in Irish (Gaeilge), Scottish Gaelic (Gàidhlig), and English. The album is a clear precursor for Ó Domhnaill's subsequent work with The Bothy Band and Nightnoise. The album includes the first extant recording of Ó Domhnaill's trademark "Fionnghuala", here titled "An Bothán A Bha'ig Fionnghuala". Other tracks are drawn from the repertoire of Rannafast (Donegal) songs collected and sung by Ó Domhnaill's aunt Nellí Ní Dhomhnaill. "The Hag at the Churn", "An Bothán A Bhaigh Fionnghuala", "The Banks of Claudy", and "The Heathery Hills of Yarrow" would all later be recorded by The Bothy Band, with Ó Domhnaill's sister Tríona Ní Dhomhnaill on vocals. "Bríd Óg Ní Mháille" was later recorded by Nightnoise. From 1973 to 1974, Hanly and Ó Domhnaill toured under the name Monroe, although that name does not appear on the album cover.

== Background ==
During the 1970s, Mícheál Ó Domhnaill was involved in some of the "most innovative projects and groups in Celtic music." After his first group, Skara Brae, disbanded in 1972, Ó Domhnaill travelled to Scotland where he collected Gaelic songs on the Islands of Lewis and Skye as part of his work with the School of Scottish studies. When he returned to Ireland, he collected and recorded songs in Donegal, many of which he found through his Aunt Neilli Ni Domhnaill, who possessed a large collection of local songs.

In 1973, while playing the club circuit in Ireland and still a student at University College Dublin, Ó Domhnaill met Mick Hanly, a Limerick-born singer, guitarist, and dulcimer player, and soon the two formed a duo called Monroe. Playing a mixture of Irish, English, and Scottish ballads, many sung in Irish (Gaeilge) and Scottish Gaelic (Gàidhlig), Monroe's music centered around acoustic guitars, dulcimer, and voices—"Hanly's brusque tones complementing Mícheál's lower-key vocals." As Monroe, Hanly and Ó Domhnaill toured Brittany often, meeting with other local and visiting Irish musicians. During this time, Brittany was enjoying a major folk revival, with artists like Alan Stivell, Tri Yann, and Sonnerien Du just emerging onto the scene. In 1974, Hanly and Ó Domhnaill recorded a single, "The Hills of Greenmore", and toured with the group Planxty as their supporting act. After enlisting the help of some of the members of Planxty—Liam O'Flynn, Dónal Lunny, and Matt Molloy—Hanly and Ó Domhnaill signed a deal with Polydor Records and recorded the album, Celtic Folkweave.

== Production ==
The album was produced by Dónal Lunny, one of the pioneers of the Irish folk music revival in the 1970s. A key member of three of traditional music's most influential groups—Planxty, The Bothy Band, and Moving Hearts—Lunny would remain at the forefront of the traditional Irish music movement for the next thirty-five years. The album was recorded at Eamon Andrews studios in Dublin. Hanly and Ó Domhnaill were supported in the studio by Liam O'Flynn on uileann pipes and whistle, Dónal Lunny on bodhrán, Matt Molloy on flute, Tommy Peoples on fiddle, Declan McNeils on bass, and Mícheál's sister Tríona Ní Dhomhnaill on harpsichord.

== Artwork and packaging ==
The album sleeve artwork was designed by Des O'Meara & Partners Ltd. and shows three connected spiral patterns (triskelion) against a black background with "Celtic Folkweave" in white stylized lettering highlighted with gold outline (some copies have red outline). The term "folkweave" refers to a type of fabric with a loose weave. The back cover contains two photos of Mick Hanly and Mícheál Ó Domhnaill, an annotated song listing, and the album credits.

== Composition ==
The album contains eleven songs of Irish, Scottish, and English ballads, sung in Irish (Gaeilge), Scottish Gaelic (Gàidhlig), and English. There are two pieces of puirt à beul, or mouth music, sung in Irish and Scottish Gaelic, five songs sung in Irish and English, two Breton tunes, one Irish dance tune, and a contemporary song in English. The album opens with "Bíodh Orm Anocht", a strange song containing nonsense rhymes sung in a mixture of Donegal and Scottish Gaelic. "The Bold Princess Royal" is a song about a ship that is attacked by pirates while on a voyage from London to Newfoundland, and manages to outrun them. "The Banks of Claudy" is a song Ó Dhomhnaill received from Nellí Ní Dhomhnaill, about a woman who resigns herself to a lonesome existence after her sailor leaves, pining after him during his absence. When he returns, he disguises himself and courts her to see if she is still faithful to him. She resists his overtures, and he finally reveals his true identity. "Éirigh's Cuir Ort Do Chuid Éadaigh" is a common tune from Rannafast, County Donegal, for which there are various sets of lyrics. The title is Irish Gaelic for "Get Up and Get Dressed". The first side of the album concludes with "A Bothán A Bha'ig Fionnghuala", an example of Scottish puirt à beul. During their live performances, this was one of their most popular songs. The song features pipes and two bodhráns.

The second side of the album opens with "The Heathery Hills of Yarrow", another song from Nellí Ní Dhomhnaill of Rannafast, County Donegal. It tells the story of a ploughboy who falls in love with a girl of high station and is slain by her brother and eight other knights. The ploughboy's sister ties his body to her back with her long hair and carries him home for burial. The spirited "Breton Dances" is a typical piece from the Breton Islands. "The Hiring Fair at Hamiltonsbawn" is a song about the injustice of a farmer who mistreats one of his hired servants. "Bríd Óg Ní Mháille" is a love song from Rannafast, County Donegal, about unrequited love. "The Glasgow Barber" is a song about a poor Irishman who arrives in Glasgow and decides to get a fashionable haircut. On seeing the result, he thinks he looks like an ass. The final song of the album, "(No Love is Sorrow) Songbird", is a contemporary song written by the British band Pentangle, who recorded it on their 1972 album, Solomon's Seal.

== Reception ==
Writing in The Green Man Review, John O'Regan called Celtic Folkweave a "seminal" album, often looked upon as "a predecessor to The Bothy Band." O'Regan praised the mixture of Irish, Scottish, and English ballads:

Celtic Folkweave includes some fine examples of the Mícheál Ó Domhnaill style and approach. Versions of 'The Banks of Claudy' and 'Heathery Hills of Yarrow' and the winsome 'Brid Og Ni Mhaille' show his sonorous voice in good stead. The Scots Gaelic mouth music of 'An Bothan a Bhaig Fhionnghuala' later became 'Fionnghuala' on the second Bothy Band album Old Hag You Have Killed Me issued in 1976. This album has now become an acid folk collector's 'holy grail'.

On the Ceol Álainn web site, dedicated to rare recordings of traditional Irish music, Dragut Reis called Celtic Folkweave an "excellent album" and a precursor to Ó Dhomhnaill's work with The Bothy Band and Nightnoise. Reis found the production "adequate", but not up to the standard of the material he would produce a year later for The Bothy Band.

== Aftermath ==
All of the musicians on Celtic Folkweave would go on to make notable contributions to the Irish and Celtic music genres, with Molloy, Lunny, Ní Dhomhnaill, Ó Domhnaill, and Peoples ending up in The Bothy Band, one of the most influential bands playing Irish traditional music in the 1970s. A number of the album's songs would end up being recorded by The Bothy Band, including "The Hag at the Churn", "An Bothán A Bha'ig Fionnghuala", "The Banks of Claudy", and "The Heathery Hills of Yarrow". Mícheál Ó Domhnaill would also go on to form partnerships with Kevin Burke and Billy Oskay. Mícheál and his sister Tríona would also go on to found the group Nightnoise, which enjoyed International success and inspired a generation of Irish musicians.

The master tapes of Celtic Folkweave were thought to have been destroyed in a fire at one of the vinyl pressing plants of Polydor Ireland in 1982 but were later uncovered at Polydor France and the album was re-released in 2022 on vinyl and compact disc with five bonus tracks and sleeve notes by Mick Hanly and Leagues O'Toole. Copies of the original vinyl album Celtic Folkweave are considered rare collector's items.

After the break-up of Monroe, Hanly returned to tour Brittany for two years and on his return recorded two Folk albums for the newly formed Mulligan Record label, A Kiss In the Morning Early and As I Went Over Blackwater, subsequent to which he toured extensively in Europe with ex Planxty member Andy Irvine. In 1983 he replaced Christy Moore as lead vocalist in the folk-rock band, Moving Hearts. After 14 months he left the band to concentrate on song writing. He signed a Publishing deal with Beann Eadair Music and a record deal with Ringsend Road records. He recorded three albums with Ringsend Road: All I Remember, Warts and All, and Happy Like This. None of these records was commercially successful, but the All I Remember album included the songs "My Love is In America", which became a successful radio hit for Dolores Keane, and "Past the Point of Rescue", which became a major hit for American Country star Hal Ketchum, reaching No 2 in the Billboard Country charts and received a BMI Two Million radio plays award. The song was also a hit in Norway for the Hellbillies and a hit in Ireland for Mary Black. Hanly continues to record and write and in 2016 released the album Homeland for Celtic Collections.

== Track listing ==
Original 1974 release
No.	Title	Writer(s)	Length
1.	"Bíodh Orm Anocht"	Traditional	1:45
2.	"The Bold Princess Royal"	Traditional	4:28
3.	"The Banks of Claudy"	Traditional	6:10
4.	"Éirigh's Cuir Ort Do Chuid Éadaigh"	Traditional	2:15
5.	"A Bothán A Bha'ig Fionnghuala"	Traditional	1:52
6.	"The Heathery Hills of Yarrow"	Traditional	5:54
7.	"Breton Dances"	Traditional	3:15
8.	"The Hiring Fair at Hamiltonsbawn"	Traditional	2:51
9.	"Bríd Óg Ní Mháille"	Traditional	3:10
10.	"The Glasgow Barber"	Traditional	3:33
11.	"(No Love is Sorrow) Songbird"	Pentangle	3:04
Total length:			38:20

2022 remastered version
No.	Title	Writer(s)	Length
1.	"An Bothán A Bha'ig Fionnghuala (Album Version)"	Traditional	1:58
2.	"Breton Dances"	Traditional	3:18
3.	"The Heathery Hills of Yarrow"	Traditional	6:04
4.	"Éirigh's Cuir Ort Do Chuid Éadaigh"	Traditional	2:19
5.	"(No Love Is Sorrow) Songbird"	Pentangle	3:09
6.	"The Bold Princess Royal"	Traditional	4:35
7.	"The Banks Of Sweet Primroses"	Traditional	2:58
8.	"Bíodh Orm Anocht"	Traditional	1:48
9.	"The Banks of Claudy"	Traditional	6:21
10.	"Hè Mandu (Bonus Single)"	Traditional	1:36
11.	"The Hiring Fair At Hamiltonsbawn"	Traditional	2:58
12.	"The Hills Of Granemore (Bonus Single)"	Traditional	3:54
13.	"Bríd Óg Ní Mháille"	Traditional	3:18
14.	"My Johnny Was A Shoemaker (Bonus Single)"	Traditional	2:11
15.	"The Glasgow Barber"	Traditional	3:41
16.	"An Bothán A Bha'ig Fionnghuala (Acapella Single Version)"	Traditional	1:51
Total length:			50:59

== Personnel ==
Music

- Mick Hanly (listed as Michael Hanly) – guitar, dulcimer, vocals
- Mícheál Ó Domhnaill (listed as Mícheál O'Donnell) – guitar, vocals
- Liam O'Flynn (listed as Liam Óg Ó Floinn) – uileann pipes, whistle
- Dónal Lunny (listed as Donal Lunney) – bodhrán
- Matt Molloy – flute
- Tommy Peoples – fiddle
- Declan McNelis– bass
- Tríona Ní Dhomhnaill – bodhrán, harpsichord

Production

- Dónal Lunny – producer
- Pat Morley – engineer
- Marcus Connaughton – sleeve notes (1974 release)
- Des O'Meara & Partners Ltd. – sleeve design
- Alan Douches – remastering (2022 release) at West West Side Music, New York
- Leagues O'Toole – sleeve notes (2022 release)
- Mick Hanly – sleeve notes (2022 release)
