= The White Horse Sessions =

Live album by Nightnoise
- Released: 1997
- Recorded: 25–26 March 1996; 17 October 1995
- Genre: Irish traditional Celtic; Chamber music Jazz
- Length: 52 minutes
- Label: Windham Hill Records
- Producer: Nightnoise

Nightnoise chronology
A Different Shore (1995)	The White Horse Sessions (1997)

The White Horse Sessions is a live album by Nightnoise. The album was released by Windham Hill Records (01934 11195-2) in 1997.

== Track listing ==
1. "Silky Flanks" by Brian Dunning (4:55)
2. "Shadow of Time" by Tríona Ní Dhomhnaill (3:32)
3. "Jig of Sorts" by Tríona Ní Dhomhnaill (3:52)
4. "Shuan" by Mícheál Ó Domhnaill (5:50)
5. "Do We?" by Brian Dunning (4:43)
6. "Murrach Na Gealaich (Murdo of the Moon)" by Johnny Cunningham (3:59)
7. "Hugh" by Tríona Ní Dhomhnaill (4:11)
8. "Moondance" by Van Morrison (6:28)
9. "Heartwood" by Tríona Ní Dhomhnaill (4:32)
10. "The Cricket's Wicket" by Mícheál Ó Domhnaill (6:23)
11. "Night in That Land" by Johnny Cunningham (3:39)
12. "At the Races" by Tríona Ní Dhomhnaill (3:33)

== Credits ==
- Mícheál Ó Domhnaill – guitar, whistle,
- Tríona Ní Dhomhnaill – vocals, piano, synthesizer
- Brian Dunning – flute, whistle
- Johnny Cunningham – fiddle
- Nightnoise – producers
- Tom Luekens – associate producer
- Bob Stark – engineer
- Mike Sakabayashi – design
- Recorded live at The White Horse Studio in Portland, OR on 25–26 March 1996
- Recorded live in Malaga, Spain on 17 October 1995 (tracks 4,11,12)
