= Promenade (Kevin Burke and Mícheál Ó Domhnaill album) =

Studio album by Kevin Burke and Mícheál Ó Domhnaill
- Released: 1979
- Recorded: 1979
- Genre: Irish traditional
- Length: 37:34
- Label: Mulligan
- Producers: Mícheál Ó Domhnaill; Gerry O'Beirne

Promenade is a studio album by Kevin Burke and Mícheál Ó Domhnaill, released in 1979 by Mulligan Records (LUN 028).

== Background ==
Mícheál Ó Domhnaill co-founded the popular Irish traditional group The Bothy Band in 1974, along with Paddy Glackin (fiddle), Matt Molloy (flute and tin whistle), Paddy Keenan (uilleann pipes and tin whistle), Dónal Lunny (bouzouki, guitar, and production), and his sister Tríona Ní Dhomhnaill (harpsichord, clavinet and vocals). Ó Domhnaill met Kevin Burke when Burke replaced Glackin as the fiddler of the band in May 1976. Much of their repertoire was rooted in the traditional music of Ireland, and their enthusiasm and musical virtuosity set a standard for future Irish traditional performers. They recorded three studio albums during their brief career: The Bothy Band (1975), Old Hag You Have Killed Me (1976), and Out of the Wind – Into the Sun (1977). A live album After Hours was released in 1979, the year the group disbanded.

== Production ==
Upon the dissolution of the Bothy Band, Ó Domhnaill and Burke formed a duo, began performing together, and recorded the album Promenade, which was co-produced by Ó Domhnaill and Gerry O'Beirne for Mulligan Records.

== Composition ==
Promenade consists of traditional songs popular within the Irish traditional music genre. "Lafferty's Reel" is a song that Burke learned from an album recorded in the 1950s by Paddy Canny and P. J. Hayes. "Walsh's Hornpipe" is a song from the southwest of Ireland that Burke learned from Jackie Daly. "The New Mown Meadow" was adapted from a tune called "Silver-Spear", which Burke first heard played by Mary Fahy in Dublin.

"Lord Franklin" tells the story of British explorer Sir John Franklin, who set off on 18 May 1845 on an expedition with 129 men to find the Northwest Passage sea route through the Arctic Ocean, along the northern coast of North America via waterways through the Canadian Arctic Archipelago, connecting the Atlantic and Pacific Oceans. They were lost in their attempt and were never heard from again. After Franklin's ship was stuck in the ice for two years, he died in 1847. The ballad writers set the song in the context of a troubled dream by Lady Jane Franklin, Sir John's widow. "Ar A Ghabháil Go Baile Átha Cliath Domh" tells the story of a man whose wife is carried off by fairies who leave in her place a changeling. When the changeling becomes ill, the man sets off to Dublin to find a doctor, but on the way he meets a beautiful woman who turns out to be his real wife. "Coinleach Ghlas An Fhómhair" is a song of unrequited love from northern Ireland.

== Reception ==
Professional ratings
Review scores
| Source | Rating |
|---|---|
| AllMusic | 3/5 stars |

Promenade has been called "one of the finest duets ever recorded in Irish traditional music". In contrast to the "propulsive power and bracing brinkmanship" produced by the Bothy Band, the duo set off on a different musical path that one reviewer from the Irish Echo called "soulful finesse".

Their sound was unrushed, detailed, spellbindingly beautiful, yet still pulsing with vitality. For tunes, it was the ultimate rhythmic glide, smooth rather than slick, without a hint of coasting. For songs, it was respect and reflection conveyed with absolute conviction.

The album's centerpiece and single was "Lord Franklin", which featured Ó Domhnaill's lilting vocals in English. He sang two other songs on the album in Irish. Ó Domhnaill's guitar playing and Burke's Sligo-style Irish fiddling achieved a "relaxed vitality" through "compelling melodies, pulsing Sligo rhythms, intricate variations, and vocal perfection".

In his review for AllMusic, Steve Winick gave the album three out of five stars, stating that the album was "not to be missed".

== Track listing ==
| No. | Title | Writer(s) | Length |
|---|---|---|---|
| 1. | "The Pigeon on the Gate / Lafferty's Reel / Matt People's Reel" | Traditional | 4:05 |
| 2. | "Lord Franklin" | Traditional | 3:50 |
| 3. | "Walsh's Hornpipe / The Old Torn Petticoat (Reel) / The Bank of Ireland" | Traditional | 6:15 |
| 4. | "Coinleach Ghlas An Fhómhair" | Traditional | 6:26 |
| 5. | "The Promenade" | Traditional | 3:50 |
| 6. | "Ar A Ghabháil Go Baile Átha Cliath Domh" | Traditional | 5:07 |
| 7. | "The Whole Chicken in the Soup / The Bird in the Bush / The New Mown Meadow / The Silver Spear" | Traditional | 4:45 |
| 8. | "The Reverend Brother's Jig / Sean Ryan's Jig" | Traditional | 3:16 |
| Total length: | | | 37:34 |

For a detailed analysis of this album's contents see the Irishtune.info album page.

== Personnel ==
Music

- Kevin Burke – fiddle
- Mícheál Ó Domhnaill – vocals, guitar, electric Piano (5)
- Tríona Ní Dhomhnaill – harmony vocals (2)
- Donal Lunny – bouzouki, bass bouzouki (2)
- Declan Sinnott – electric bass, electric guitar (5,6)

Production

- Mícheál Ó Domhnaill – producer
- Gerry O'Beirne – producer
- Philip Begly – engineer
- Huw Thomas – assistant engineer
- Paul Thomas – assistant engineer
- Willy Mathews – front cover
- Whitney Beard – design and layout
