= Mick Hanly =

Irish singer (born (1949)

- Born: Michael Hanly; 3 July 1949 (age 76); Limerick, Ireland
- Origin: Limerick, County Limerick, Ireland
- Genres: Irish folk
- Occupations: Musician, singer-songwriter
- Instruments: Vocals, guitar
- Years active: 1972–present

Michael "Mick" Hanly (born 3 July 1949) is an Irish singer and composer from Limerick. In the 1970s, he formed several folk music duos, first with Mícheál Ó Domhnaill, then with Andy Irvine and, more recently, with Dónal Lunny. From 1982 until 1985, he was a member of Moving Hearts. Hanly is known for composing "Past the Point of Rescue", which was first recorded by Mary Black (1988) and also by American artist Hal Ketchum (1991).

== Early life ==
Hanly grew up in Limerick City and his musical interests were mainly rock 'n roll in the fifties and the sixties. He taught himself to play guitar and his live debut in 1958 was in accompanying himself perform "Livin' Doll" at a primary school concert. After leaving school in 1970, he joined E.S.B. (Electricity Supply Board) in Galway City. After discovering folk music through Seán Ó Riada and also the playing of Clare uilleann piper Willie Clancy, he performed Woody Guthrie and Paul Simon material in the Golden Key, a folk music venue. Mick's brother, David, worked as a broadcaster RTÉ Radio 1's Morning Ireland, and they sometimes performed together.

== Career ==
He met Mícheál Ó Domhnaill in early 1972 and formed a duo called Monroe. They toured Brittany often, meeting with other local and visiting Irish musicians. During this time, Brittany was enjoying a major folk revival, with artists like Alan Stivell, Tri Yann, and Sonerien Du just emerging onto the scene. In 1974, Hanly and Ó Domhnaill recorded a single, "The Hills of Greenmore", and toured with the group Planxty as their supporting act. After enlisting the help of some of the members of Planxty—Liam O'Flynn, Dónal Lunny, and Matt Molloy—Hanly and Ó Domhnaill signed a deal with Polydor Records and recorded the album, Celtic Folkweave.

Monroe split in 1975 when Ó Domhnaill joined the Bothy Band, and Hanly returned to Brittany and the life of an itinerant Irish folk troubadour. He returned to Ireland in 1977 to record two albums for the Mulligan label, A Kiss In the Morning Early and As I Went Over Blackwater with Lunny, Irvine, Molloy, Paddy Glackin, Noel Hill, piper Peter Browne and Declan Sinnott. After the release of his debut solo album, Hanly regularly embarked on Irish and European tours with Irvine, after the demise of the Planxty, including at 'The 4th Irish Folk Festival' in Germany (30 April 1977) and the following year, when they were joined on stage by Liam O'Flynn at 'The 5th Irish Folk Festival' (28 April 1978).

From 1982 until 1985, he was a member of Moving Hearts. Hanly is known for composing "Past the Point of Rescue", which was first covered by Mary Black (1988) and also by American artist Hal Ketchum (1991).

== Selected discography ==
- Celtic Folkweave (Polydor, 1974)
- A Kiss in the Morning Early (Mulligan, 1976)
- As I Went Over Blackwater (Mulligan, 1980) – with Andy Irvine
- Still Not Cured (WEA, 1987)
- All I Remember (1989)
- Warts & All (Round Tower, 1991)
- Happy Like This (Round Tower, 1994)
- Live at the Meeting Place (Doghouse, 1998)
- Wooden Horses (Doghouse, 2000)
- Wish Me Well (Doghouse, 2004)
- Mick Hanly & Friends Live (Doghouse, 2011)
- Homeland (Celtic Collections, 2016)

== Bibliography ==
- Hanly, Mick (2005). Wish Me Well: Notes on My Sleeve. Ireland: Gill & Macmillan. ISBN 0-7171-3890-9.
