= Something of Time =

Studio album by Nightnoise
- Released: 1987
- Recorded: 1986–1987
- Genre: Irish traditional Celtic; Chamber music Jazz; New Age
- Length: 50:06 (LP); 56:00 (compact disc)
- Label: Windham Hill Records
- Producer: Billy Oskay; Mícheál Ó Domhnaill

Nightnoise chronology
Nightnoise (1984)	Something of Time (1987)	At the End of the Evening (1988)

Something of Time is a studio album by Nightnoise. The album was released by Windham Hill Records (WD-1057) in 1987.

== Track listing ==
1. "Timewinds" by Billy Oskay (3:47)
2. "Perchance to Dream" (Billy Oskay, Mícheál Ó Domhnaill) – 4:56
3. "The Erebus and the Terror" (M. Ó Domhnaill) – 4:34
4. "On the Deep" (M. Ó Domhnaill) – (4:05)
5. "Hourglass" (M. Ó Domhnaill) – (6:05)
6. "Shadows on a Dancefloor" (M. Ó Domhnaill) – (3:53)
7. "Wiggy Wiggy" (M. Ó Domhnaill) – (4:22)
8. "Tundra Summer" (Oskay) – (4:49)
9. "Aprés-Midi" (Tríona Ní Dhomhnaill) – (3:54)
10. "Something of Time" (M. Ó Domhnaill) – (3:04)
11. "Toys Not Ties" (Brian Dunning) – (3:59)
12. "I Still Remember" (Oskay) – (3:45) [CD bonus track]
13. "One for the Lad" (M. Ó Domhnaill) – (4:12) [CD bonus track]

== Credits ==
- Billy Oskay – violin, viola, piano, harmonium, producer, engineer, mixing, digital editing and assembly
- Mícheál Ó Domhnaill – guitar, whistle, piano, harmonium, synthesizer, vocals, producer
- Tríona Ní Dhomhnaill – harmonium, harpsichord, synthesizer
- Brian Dunning – flute, alto flute, panpipes
- Stewart Whitmore – digital editing and assembly
- Bernie Grundman – mastering
- Ian Matthews – mixing
- Howard Johnston – mixing
- John F. Cooper – photography
- Anne Robinson – design

== Notes ==
Recorded at Nightnoise Studio, Portland, Oregon in 1985 and 1986.

Track 7 is called "Wiggy Wiggy" A State Of Being on the LP sleeve back, but only the liner notes on the CD release.

Track 11 is called "Toys Not Ties" An Adult's Lament on the LP sleeve back, but only the liner notes on the CD release.

Track 12 is called "One For The Lad" For Tich Richardson R.I.P. in the liner notes only. Tich Richardson was a member of Boys of the Lough. He died in an auto accident in Scotland in 1984.
