= A Different Shore =

Studio album by Nightnoise
- Released: 1995
- Recorded: 1995
- Genre: Irish traditional Celtic; Chamber music Jazz
- Length: 52:38
- Label: Windham Hill Records
- Producer: Nightnoise

Nightnoise chronology
Shadow of Time (1993)	A Different Shore (1995)	The White Horse Sessions (1997)

Professional ratings
Review scores
Source	Rating
AllMusic	3/5 stars

A Different Shore is the sixth studio album by Nightnoise. The album was released by Windham Hill Records on 9 May 1995.

== Track listing ==
No.	Title	Writer(s)	Length
1.	"Call of the Child"	Brian Dunning	5:01
2.	"For Eamonn"	Mícheál Ó Domhnaill	6:52
3.	"Falling Apples"	Tríona Ní Dhomhnaill	4:48
4.	"The Busker on the Bridge"	Brian Dunning	4:02
5.	"Morning in Madrid"	Johnny Cunningham	5:07
6.	"Another Wee Niece"	Tríona Ní Dhomhnaill	4:23
7.	"A Different Shore"	Johnny Cunningham	5:43
8.	"Mind the Dresser"	Tríona Ní Dhomhnaill	5:33
9.	"Clouds Go By"	Brian Dunning	4:42
10.	"Shuan"	Mícheál Ó Domhnaill	6:27
Total length:			52:38

== Musicians ==
- Mícheál Ó Domhnaill – vocals, guitar, whistle, synthesizer
- Tríona Ní Dhomhnaill – vocals, piano, accordion, whistle, synthesizer
- Brian Dunning – flute, alto flute, base flute, whistle, accordion, vocals
- Johnny Cunningham – fiddle, vocals

== Production ==
- DanDan FitzGerald – engineer, mixing
- Bernie Grundman – mastering
- Kevan Scott – Mixing Assistante
- Candace Upman – art direction
- Sandy Del Rio – graphic design
- Jonathan Williams – photography (cover)
- Recorded at White Horse Studios, Portland, Oregon

Track information and credits adapted from the album's liner notes.
