= Skara Brae (disambiguation) =

Skara Brae is a Neolithic settlement in Orkney, Scotland.

Skara Brae may also refer to:

- Skara Brae (band), a traditional Irish music group from the 1970s
  - Skara Brae (album), 1971
- Skara Brae, a town in the Ultima computer role-playing game series
- Skara Brae, the main settlement in The Bard's Tale computer role-playing game series
