= Maighréad Ní Dhomhnaill (album) =

Maighréad Ní Dhomnaill

Studio album by Maighread Ní Dhomhnaill
- Released: 1976
- Recorded: 1976; Eamonn Andrews Studios, Dublin
- Genre: Irish traditional Folk; Celtic
- Label: Gael-Linn
- Producer: Mícheál Ó Domhnaill

Maighread Ní Dhomhnaill chronology
Maighréad Ní Dhomnaill (1976)	Gan Dhá Phingin Spré (1991)

Maighréad Ní Dhomhnaill is the début music album by Irish musician Maighréad Ní Dhomhnaill. It was released in Ireland in 1976.

== Track listing ==
1. "Éirigh Suas A Stóirín"
2. "Máire An Chúil Óir Bhuí"
3. "Fóill, Fóill A Shagairt"
4. "Lately Last Night"
5. "Here's a Health"
6. "Ar A Dhul Go Baile Átha Cliath Dhomh"
7. "Róisín Dubh"
8. "Amhrán Hiúdaí Phádaí Éamoinn"
9. "Barbara Allen"
10. "Séan Ó Duibhir An Ghleanna"
