= The Parting Tide =

Studio album by Nightnoise
- Released: 1990
- Recorded: 1990
- Genres: Irish traditional Celtic; Chamber music Jazz
- Length: 46:06
- Label: Windham Hill Records
- Producer: Mícheál Ó Domhnaill

Nightnoise chronology
At the End of the Evening (1988)	The Parting Tide (1990)	Shadow of Time (1993)

The Parting Tide is a studio album by Nightnoise. The album was released by Windham Hill Records (WD-1097) in 1990.

== Track listing ==
No.	Title	Writer(s)	Length
1.	"Bleu"	Brian Dunning	4:56
2.	"An Irish Carol"	Tríona Ní Dhomhnaill	8:00
3.	"Jig of Sorts"	Tríona Ní Dhomhnaill	3:29
4.	"Through the Castle Garden"	Tríona Ní Dhomhnaill	2:52
5.	"Island of Hope and Tears"	Tríona Ní Dhomhnaill	4:45
6.	"The Kid in the Cot"	Brian Dunning	6:05
7.	"The Tryst"	Billy Oskay	4:23
8.	"Snow Is Lightly Falling"	Tríona Ní Dhomhnaill	3:55
9.	"The Abbot"	Mícheál Ó Domhnaill	7:41
Total length:			46:06

== Credits ==
- Billy Oskay – violin, viola, keyboards, recording supervisor, mixing
- Mícheál Ó Domhnaill – guitar, whistle, keyboards, vocals, producer
- Tríona Ní Dhomhnaill – vocals, piano, keyboards, whistle, accordion
- Brian Dunning – flute, alto flute, panpipes, panflute
- Brian Willis – cymbal (8)
- Mark Boddeker – mastering supervisor
- Bernie Grundman – mastering
- Anne Robinson – art direction
- Erv Schroeder – photography (front cover)
- Irene Young – photography
- Notes Published by Nightnoise Music (BMI)/Windham Hill Music (BMI)
- Recorded at Nightnoise Studios, Portland, OR
- Mastered at Bernie Grundman Mastering, Hollywood, CA
