= Shadow of Time (album) =

Studio album by Nightnoise
- Released: 1993
- Recorded: 1993
- Genre: Irish traditional Celtic; Chamber music Jazz
- Length: 44:46
- Label: Windham Hill Records
- Producer: Dawn Atkinson; Nightnoise

Nightnoise chronology
| The Parting Tide (1990) | Shadow of Time (1993) | A Different Shore (1995) |

Shadow of Time is a studio album by Nightnoise. The album was released by Windham Hill Records (01934 11130-2) in 1993.

== Track listing ==
| No. | Title | Writer(s) | Length |
|---|---|---|---|
| 1. | "One Little Nephew" | Mícheál Ó Domhnaill | 5:04 |
| 2. | "The March Air" | Mícheál Ó Domhnaill | 5:06 |
| 3. | "Shadow of Time" | Tríona Ní Dhomhnaill | 3:30 |
| 4. | "Silky Flanks" | Brian Dunning | 4:46 |
| 5. | "Water Falls" | Tríona Ní Dhomhnaill | 2:44 |
| 6. | "Fionnghuala" | Traditional mouth music | 1:54 |
| 7. | "Night in That Land" | Johnny Cunningham | 3:11 |
| 8. | "This Just In" | Tríona Ní Dhomhnaill | 4:14 |
| 9. | "For You" | Brian Dunning | 2:58 |
| 10. | "Sauvie Island" | Mícheál Ó Domhnaill | 4:25 |
| 11. | "The Rose of Tralee" | Charles W. Glover | 3:17 |
| 12. | "Three Little Nieces" | Tríona Ní Dhomhnaill | 3:37 |
| Total length: | | | 44:46 |

== Credits ==
- Mícheál Ó Domhnaill – vocals, guitar, whistle, harmonium, synthesizer
- Tríona Ní Dhomhnaill – vocals, piano, accordion, whistle, synthesizer, harmonium
- Brian Dunning – flute, alto flute, whistle, vocals, synthesizer
- Johnny Cunningham – fiddle
- Dawn Atkinson – producer
- Nightnoise – producer, arrangements (6,11)
- Bob Stark – recording engineer, mixing
- Bernie Grundman – mastering
- Candace Upman – art direction
- Sandy Del Rio – graphic design
- Pam Gorelow – digitally editing and assembly
- Kate Power – artwork calligraphy
- Thea Schrack – photography (cover)
- Kevin Laubacher – photography (back cover)
- Al Evers – management
- Judi Nudo – stylist
- Recorded and mixed at White Horse Studios, Portland, OR, January–February 1993
- Digitally edited and assembled at Windham Hill Records, Mill Valley, CA
- Mastered at Bernie Grundman Mastering, Hollywood, CA
