= Gan Dhá Phingin Spré (No Dowry) =

Album by Maighread Ní Dhomhnaill

Studio album by Maighread Ní Dhomhnaill
- Released: 1991
- Recorded: 1991
- Genre: Irish traditional Folk; Celtic
- Label: Gael-Linn
- Producer: Dónal Lunny

Maighread Ní Dhomhnaill chronology
Maighréad Ní Dhomhnaill (1976)	Gan Dhá Phingin Spré (No Dowry) (1991)	Idir an Dá Sholas (1999)

Dhá Phingin Spré (No Dowry) is the second music album by Irish musician Maighread Ní Dhomhnaill. It was released in both Ireland and contintenal Europe in 1991.

== Track listing ==
1. "Amhrán Pheadar Breathnach"
2. "A Mhaithrín Dhíleas"
3. "An Cáilín Gaelach"
4. "Colm Cille na Féile"
5. "The Green Wood Laddie"
6. "Is Fada Liom Uaim Í"
7. "Martha, The Flower of Sweet Strabane"
8. "Knickers of Corduroy"
9. "An Clár Bog Deil"
10. "Lily of the West"
