= At the End of the Evening =

Studio album by Nightnoise
- Released: 1988
- Recorded: 1987–1988
- Genre: Irish traditional Celtic; Chamber music Jazz
- Length: 47 minutes
- Label: Windham Hill Records
- Producer: Nightnoise

Nightnoise chronology
Something of Time (1987)	At the End of the Evening (1988)	The Parting Tide (1990)

At the End of the Evening is a studio album by Nightnoise. The album was released by Windham Hill Records (WD-1076) in 1988.

== Track listing ==
1. "Windell" by Billy Oskay and Mícheál Ó Domhnaill (3:47)
2. "Of a Summer Morn" by Mícheál Ó Domhnaill (3:21)
3. "Hugh" by Tríona Ní Dhomhnaill (3:39)
4. "Jaunting" by Brian Dunning (3:35)
5. "The Courtyard" by Billy Oskay (2:48)
6. "'Bring Me Back A Song.'" by Mícheál Ó Domhnaill (4:50)
7. "Snow on High Ground" by Tríona Ní Dhomhnaill (3:43)
8. "At the Races" by Tríona Ní Dhomhnaill (3:06)
9. "Forgotten Carnival" by Brian Dunning (3:30)
10. "The Cuillin Hills" by Tríona Ní Dhomhnaill (2:47)
11. "Her Kansas Sun" by Billy Oskay (3:35)
12. "End of the Evening" by Tríona Ní Dhomhnaill (5:06)
13. "The Swan" by Mícheál Ó Domhnaill (3:17)

== Credits ==
- Billy Oskay – violin, viola, keyboards, engineer
- Mícheál Ó Domhnaill – guitar, keyboards, whistle
- Tríona Ní Dhomhnaill – keyboards, Whistle, accordion, vocals
- Brian Dunning – flute, panpipes
- Nightnoise – producer
- Bernie Grundman – mastering
- Anne Robinson – art direction, artwork
- Candace Upman – graphic design
- John Helyar – photography (booklet)
- Carl Studna – photography (Cover)
