= Shadow of Time =

Shadow of Time may refer to:

- Shadow of Time (album), a 1993 studio album by Irish music ensemble Nightnoise
- Shadows of Time, a 2004 Bengali language German film by Florian Gallenberger
- The Shadow Out of Time, a 1936 horror novella by American author Howard Phillips Lovecraft
