= Billy Oskay =

American violinist and record producer

Billy Oskay is an American violinist and record producer.

== Biography ==
Billy Oskay was born and raised in Kingston, New York, where he first learned to play the violin at the age seven. In 1970, he began studying under Eugen Prokop at the International Academy of Music in Palma de Mallorca, Spain and in 1971 earned his master's degree in music from Ball State University in Indiana. Oskay was the head of the music department at Oregon's Mt. Angel College, and later joined the swing combo Everything's Jake.

In 1983, he met Irish guitarist Mícheál Ó Domhnaill who was an influential figure in the Irish traditional music scene of the late 1970s and early 1980s, having performed for seven years with The Bothy Band and collaborated for several years with the master fiddler Kevin Burke. Oskay and Ó Domhnaill began to collaborate on a new and innovative music that integrated traditional Irish, jazz, and classical chamber music. They composed and recorded some songs in Oskay's Portland, Oregon home and were pleased with the unique understated sound they had created, which had a "rough but fresh quality that engendered a serene atmosphere". Ó Domhnaill signed a contract with William Ackerman at Windham Hill Records, and the tracks he and Oskay had recorded in Portland were mixed and released in 1984 under the title Nightnoise.

In 1987, Oskay and Ó Domhnaill were joined by Mícheál's sister, Irish pianist and vocalist Tríona Ní Dhomhnaill, and Irish-American flutist Brian Dunning to found the musical group Nightnoise. The group toured the world and recorded three additional albums: Something of Time (1987), At the End of the Evening (1988), and The Parting Tide (1990). During that time, Oskay emerged as a prolific session musician appearing on projects by harp guitarist John Doan, bluegrass guitarist Dan Crary, and others. Oskay also produced many albums at his Oskay Recording studio in Portland.

In 1992, Oskay left Nightnoise to focus on record production. In 1993, he purchased 26 acres (11 ha) of land in Corbett, Oregon, where he built the Big Red Studio from 1997 to 2000. The studio's centerpiece was a 1979 Trident TSM console, once owned by José Feliciano. Since 2000 Oskay has produced numerous musical artists at his Big Red Studio in Corbett, including Drum Hat Buddha (2001) by Dave Carter and Tracy Grammer, Blu di Genova (2003) by Beppe Gambetta, and Renaissance of the Steel-String Guitar (2004) by Dan Crary. He still performs violin occasionally with Seattle-based singer-songwriter Jim Page.

== Discography ==
- Nightnoise (1984)
- Something of Time (1987)
- At the End of the Evening (1988)
- The Parting Tide (1990)
