= David Hanly =

Irish broadcaster, journalist and writer (1944–2025)

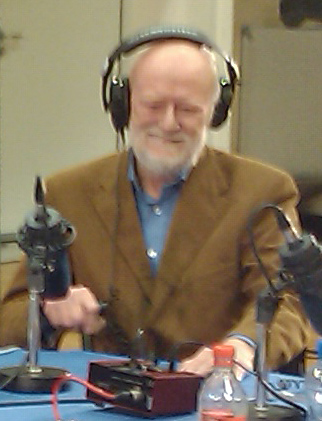
- Hanly in 2009
- Born: 1944; Limerick, Ireland
- Died: 21 November 2025 (aged 81); Dublin, Ireland
- Education: CBS Sexton Street Limerick city
- Occupation: Journalist; author
- Employers: Raidió Teilifís Éireann (RTÉ); Bórd Fáilte; Sunday Tribune
- Children: 3
- Relatives: Mick Hanly (brother)

David Hanly (1944 – 21 November 2025) was an Irish writer and broadcaster. He was a co-presenter of RTÉ Radio 1's Morning Ireland from its launch in 1984 until his retirement in 2002. He won a Jacob's Award in 1985. His television show Hanly's People featured in-depth interviews with people such as Seán Boylan and David Norris. In 1995, he secured the first interview with Seamus Heaney after he won the Nobel Prize for Literature.

Hanly was born in 1944. As a writer, he wrote for serial dramas The Kennedys of Castleross, and The Riordans. His novel In Guilt and in Glory was first published in 1979.

In 2001, Hanly campaigned for the establishment of an arts centre on Arthur's Quay, Limerick city.

David's brother Mick is a singer-songwriter known for "Past the Point of Rescue", and the brothers sometimes performed together.

Hanly died on 21 November 2025, at the age of 81.

== Bibliography ==
- David Hanly (1979). In Guilt and in Glory: Novel. W. Morrow and Company. ISBN 0688034217.
