= Skara Brae (album) =

Studio album by Skara Brae
- Released: 1971
- Recorded: 1971
- Venue: Marianella Hall, Rathgar
- Genre: Irish traditional music
- Label: Gael Linn
- Producer: Skara Brae

Skara Brae is an album of Irish traditional music by the group Skara Brae. Released by Gael Linn Records in 1971, the self-titled album contains "beautifully performed Gaelic songs" and is considered one of the most important albums in its genre, notable as the first recording to include vocal harmonization in Irish language songs.

== Track listing ==
Original 1971 album

In 1971, Skara Brae released one self-titled album on Gael Linn Records (CEF 031) with the following track listing:

Side 1

1. "An Cailín Rua"
2. "An Suantraí"
3. "Bánchnoic Éireann Óighe"
4. "Angela"
5. "Táim Breoite go Leor"
6. "Inis Dhún Rámha"
7. "An Saighdiúir Tréigthe"

Side 2

1. "Cad é Sin don Té Sin"
2. "An Chrúbach"
3. "Casadh an tSúgáin"
4. "Caitlín Óg"
5. "Airdí a' Chumhaing"
6. "Tá Mé 'mo Shuí"

Reissued 1998 CD

In 1998, the album was reissued by Gael Linn on CD (CEFCD 031) with the following track listing:

1. "An Cailín Rua" (The redhead)
2. "Suantraí Hiúdaí" (Hiúdaí's lullaby)
3. "Bánchnoic Éireann Ó" (The fair hills of Ireland)
4. "Angela" (instrumental)
5. "Táim Breoite go Leor" (I am quite sick)
6. "Inis Dhún Rámha"
7. "An Saighdiúir Tréigthe" (The deserted soldier)
8. "Cad é sin don té Sin" (To whom it does not concern)
9. "An Chrúbach" (The troublesome cow)
10. "Casadh an tSúgáin" (instrumental)
11. "Caitlín Óg"
12. "Airdí Cuan"
13. "Tá mé 'mo Shuí" (I am sitting up awake)
14. "An Buinneán Buí" (The yellow bittern)
15. "Caitlín Tiriall"

== Credits ==
- Maighread Ní Dhomhnaill – vocals, arrangements
- Tríona Ní Dhomhnaill – vocals, arrangements
- Mícheál Ó Domhnaill – vocals, guitar, arrangements
- Dáithí Sproule – vocals, guitar, arrangements
- Darby Carroll – engineering
- James G. Maguire – cover photography
- Robyn Robins – digital remastering (reissue)
