= The Kennedys of Castleross =

Irish serial drama (1955–1973)

The Kennedys of Castleross was an Irish serial drama or soap opera, about a family from Castleross, broadcast on Raidió Éireann from 1955 to 1973.

The serial was devised by Arks advertising agency on behalf of its client, Fry-Cadbury. The Fry-Cadbury Ireland Sales and Marketing Director Raymond Sellers (later Chairman & MD) was aware of the success and quality of the serial drama The Archers on the BBC Home Service in his native UK from its launch in 1951 and had commissioned the Arks advertising agency to devise, develop and produce a similar popular rural radio serial, set in Ireland and tailored for an Irish audience, which could fit in two weekly 15 minute sponsored programme slots on Raidió Éireann. The first script writers were Mark Grantham and Bill Nugent. The first episode was broadcast on 14 April 1955. The cast included Marie Kean, T. P. McKenna, Vincent Dowling, Angela Newman, and Philip O'Flynn.

Each fifteen-minute episode was transmitted at lunchtime on Tuesdays and Thursdays. The programme's signature tune was the second movement of Hamilton Harty's An Irish Symphony, sub-titled The Fair Day.

During its long run, various other scriptwriters worked on The Kennedys of Castleross, including playwright Hugh Leonard and broadcaster David Hanly.

When Fry-Cadbury withdrew its sponsorship and funding in the early 1960s, transferring their advertising budget to producing & placing commercials on the new television service Telefis Éireann, Raidió Éireann bowed to popular demand and sought to acquire the rights to the serial, which Fry-Cadbury agreed to sell for one pound, thus enabling Raidió Éireann to retain the serial as part of its regular programming. However, after an almost 18-year unbroken run, the station announced in January 1973 that The Kennedys of Castleross had reached the end of its natural life and would be cancelled. As a measure of how much the long-running soap opera's popularity had declined since its heyday, Radio Éireann received only one letter of protest following the announcement.

For the final episode, Raidió Éireann broke with convention and broadcast a special one-hour edition on Saturday 24 February 1973.
