= Skara Brae (band) =

Irish traditional music band

- Skara Brae in Gaoth Dobhair (2005)

Background information
- Origin: Ranafast, County Donegal, Ireland
- Genres: Folk; Celtic
- Years active: 1970–1971
- Label: Gael-Linn
- Members: Dáithí Sproule; Tríona Ní Dhomhnaill; Maighread Ní Dhomhnaill
- Past members: Mícheál Ó Domhnaill

Skara Brae were an Irish traditional music group from Kells, County Meath, with origins in Ranafast (Rann na Feirste), County Donegal. The group consisted of three siblings, Mícheál Ó Domhnaill, Tríona Ní Dhomhnaill, and Maighread Ní Dhomhnaill, with Dáithí Sproule from Derry. Their debut and only album Skara Brae is considered a seminal album in the Irish music tradition.

== Origin ==
Though brought up in County Meath, the Ó Domhnaill siblings had their roots in Ranafast (Rann na Feirste), where their father's family originated. Mícheál, Maighread, and Tríona came together with Dáithí during Irish language summer schools held in Rannafast during the late 1960s and subsequently formed the band Skara Brae while Triona and Maighread were still attending school. Mícheál and Dáithí were attending University College Dublin and performed in the city over the next year.

== History ==
=== Unique album ===
In 1971, Skara Brae released Skara Brae, a self-titled album of "beautifully performed Gaelic songs" on Gael-Linn Records. It is considered one of the most important albums in its genre, notable as the first recording to include vocal harmonization in Irish language songs.

=== Post-breakup ===
The group disbanded in 1972. Dáithi Sproule went on to perform with numerous musicians before joining Irish supergroup Altan in 1992. Mícheál Ó Domhnaill and Tríona Ní Dhomhnaill later co-founded the influential Bothy Band in 1974, with flute player Matt Molloy, a succession of renowned fiddlers Paddy Glackin, Tommy Peoples, and Kevin Burke, piper Paddy Keenan, and Dónal Lunny.

=== Reunions ===
Skara Brae reunited for two concerts for the Scoil Gheimhridh Frankie Kennedy in Gaoth Dobhair, County Donegal: the first one on 27 December 1997 (at Ionad Cois Locha in Dunlewey, County Donegal) and the second one in 2005.

On 12 September 2013, Dáithí Sproule announced the first Skara Brae (five-date) US tour to last from 25 to 30 October 2013 and to visit five American cities (Milwaukee, WI on 25; Madison, WI on 26; Saint Paul, MN on 27; Portland, OR on 29; Seattle, WA on 30). The newly reunited band will include Maighread Ní Dhomhnaill, Tríona Ní Dhomhnaill and Dáithí Sproule.

== Discography ==
- Skara Brae (1971)

== See also ==
- Skara Brae, an archeology site featuring the most complete neolithic village in Europe
