= Jeff Johnson (musician) =

American recording artist (born 1956)

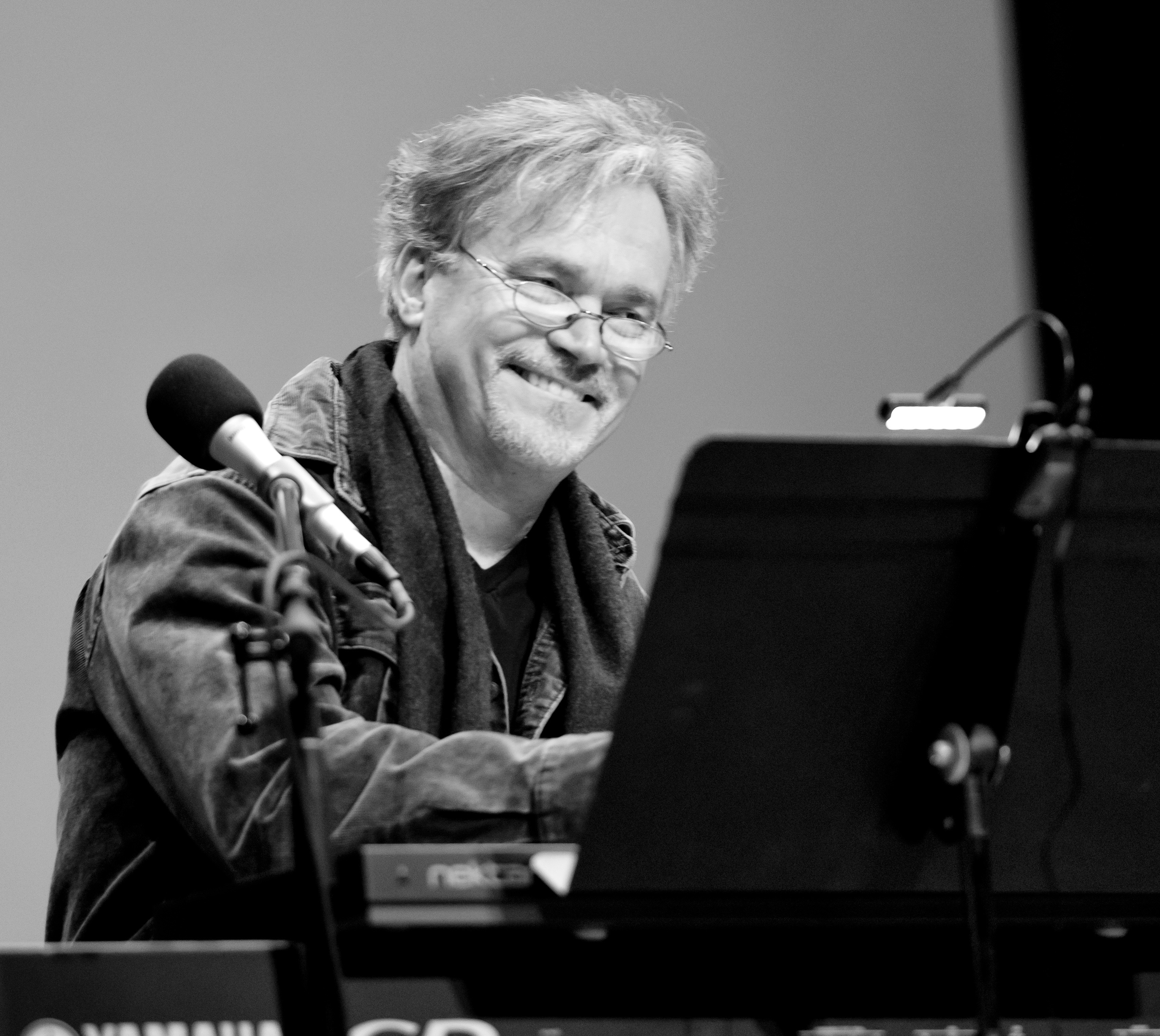

Background information
- Origin: Camano Island, Washington, United States
- Genres: Progressive rock, Celtic, new-age Contemplative
- Years active: 1980–present
- Label: Ark Records
- Website: Ark Records

Jeff Johnson (born 1956) is a recording artist, composer, and producer who has released numerous solo and collaborative recordings. Born near Portland, Oregon, he currently resides on Camano Island in the state of Washington.

His early work was vocal progressive-rock, but his sound has since evolved to jazz, new-age, instrumental, contemplative and Celtic styles. His works also include several musical releases based on books penned by fantasy author Stephen Lawhead. Johnson's instrumental releases cover a broad spectrum of Celtic, new-age, jazz and world music genres.

In addition to recording, Johnson has led a Christian contemplative worship service called Selah featuring music, scripture, poetry and silent prayer.

== Ark Records ==
Ark Records publishes most of Johnson's albums.

Jeff Johnson produced music since his early teens, and started Ark Records in "a small studio in our house with a friend back in 1977" (Tigard, Oregon). Learning the recording process in a pre-PC age helped him hone his skills. "Back then, it was all tape-based and the curve was high in learning how to record, edit and mix music." Ark Records has produced and distributed more than 50 albums.

Around 1998, Johnson moved Ark Records to the San Juan Islands in Washington State.

== Early recordings ==
Johnson's early vocal recordings were stylistically progressive rock. The lyrics were inspired by a diverse group of authors, artists and historical figures including C. S. Lewis, Charles Williams, George MacDonald, Blaise Pascal, Francis Schaeffer, Tom Stoppard, William Shakespeare, Auguste Rodin, Paul Gauguin, Pierre-Auguste Renoir and Ludwig II of Bavaria.

His first recording efforts, The Anvil Of God's Word and Please Forgive Us, Lord were released on vinyl in 1976 and 1977. A selection of the two album's songs were compiled on a CD entitled Early Songs as part of the ArkMusic Special Editions series.

His first album, The Face of the Deep (1980), managed to conjure aural landscapes in the ears of his listeners with his synthesizer infused progressive rock renditions of fantasy works. The album begins with the pensive image of Rodin's The Thinker. Songs are inspired by writings such as Charles Williams' All Hallows' Eve, and by the paintings of Gauguin and Renoir's The Moulin de la Galette. Johnson completes his treatment of these aural landscapes with on-location recordings of atmospheric sounds such as rain storms and creaking gates, incorporating them into the music in an artful way.

On his second album, he collaborated with Sandy Simpson to record Through the Door (1982), which took up the theme of spiritual quest inspired by the novels of George MacDonald (The Golden Key). It also continued the use of synthesizers in the slightly sci-fi themed song, The Jupiter Effect.

Johnson continued the theme of the spiritual quest on albums such as: Fallen Splendour and Pilgrimage. Incorporating influences from several of the Inklings, including a song inspired by C.S. Lewis — Dream of the Island (Similitudes).

His more recent vocal works are more liturgically inspired. Lyrics include passages from the Biblical Psalms as well as prayers by early Irish saints Columba and Patrick as well as Teresa of Ávila and Francis of Assisi.

== Collaborations ==
While Johnson performs and records some solo material, most of his recent work features collaborations with other Celtic, rock, contemplative, and World musicians. In an interview with Patheos, Johnson said, "Collaboration sometimes brings the best out of us. It also helps you feel that you are contributing to another's gifts and creativity."

Sandy Simpson

Johnson first met Oregon guitarist and singer, Sandy Simpson, in 1979 while working as composers at a Portland Oregon commercial music company, Alpha Seven Productions. They would record two fantasy based releases, "Through the Door" (1982) and "The Awakening" (1986). Simpson also made significant contributions as a producer and performer on Johnson's "Shadow Play" (1983), "Icons" (1984), "Fallen Splendor" (1986) and "Pilgrimage" (1989). The pair would also produce and record a string of contemporary instrumental recordings together including "No Shadow of Turning" (1985) featuring Dieter Zander and Kathy McClatchy, "Why Should the Heart Not Dance?" (1988) featuring Kathy McClatchy, and "This Mystery I Pose" (1988).

David Friesen

Oregon jazz bassist, David Friesen first appeared on Jeff Johnson's "Shadow Play" (1983). The two would go on to enjoy a fruitful collaboration with new age instrumental recordings, "Born of Water" (1986) with Dave Hagelganz and "Inner Voices" (1987) with Paul Horn. Johnson would engineer and coproduce three additional Friesen jazz instrumental releases, "Other Times, Other Places" (1989) with Airto Moreira, Flora Purim, Denny Zeitlin and Alan Jones, "Departure" (1990) with Uwe Kropinski and "Long Trip Home" (1992).\

Dallas McKennon

Jeff first met actor/voice talent, Dallas McKennon in 1982 when he and Sandy Simpson asked him to perform the wizard's voice for "Through the Door". McKennon would again appear as the wizard on "The Awakening" (1986) and would recite all of the poems for "Centerpoint – Poetry and Music for Christmas" (1990).

Brian Dunning

His work with Irish flutist Brian Dunning began on the 1991 album Great Romantics and continued through several albums, including the 2018 release Eirlandia. The Smooth Jazz Ride calls the collaboration on Erilandia, "a great reunion of musical minds bent on excellence".

Johnson and Dunning were joined by Belfast violinist, John Fitzpatrick on a compilation of the favorite hymns of Ruth Bell Graham (Mrs. Billy Graham) entitled "A Quiet Knowing - Canticles for the Heart" (2000). The recording was made into a film of the same name released by Thomas Nelson Publishers featuring live performances of Johnson, Dunning, Fitzpatrick and Portland, Oregon guitarist, Tim Ellis.

Johnson, Dunning and Fitzpatrick also created "The Katurran Odyssey" (2004), an accompanying instrumental release for the children's illustrated book by Terryl Whitlatch published by Simon & Schuster (2004).

Music by Johnson and Dunning has been featured in numerous soundtracks, the most significant being their song, "Vows" (2020) which was heard in the Martin Scorsese film, Gangs of New York.

Johnson and Dunning released a series of Celtic Christmas instrumental recordings including "A Quiet Knowing Christmas" (2001), "Stars in the Morning East - A Christmas Meditation" (2005) and "Dreams of a Christmas Night" (2007). Jeff and Brian were joined by violinist, Wendy Goodwin on "Under the Wonder Sky" (2010). Many of the songs from these ArkMusic releases were licensed by Windham Hill Records for the "Celtic Christmas" and "Winter Solstice" compilation releases.

Violinist, Wendy Goodwin joined Johnson and Dunning on the instrumental recording, "Winterfold" (2013). The title was inspired by the stories and poetry of Orkney Island's writer, George MacKay Brown. The trio released two other instrumental recordings. "If I Do Not Remember …" (2016) and "Kohelet" (2020).

Johnson and Dunning's final collaboration was a musical rendition of the W.B. Yeats (1865–1939) "The Lake Isle of Innisfree". After Dunning's death in 2022, Johnson released two retrospective albums featuring the duo's 35-year collaboration. "Coming, Going" and "Winter Songs"

Janet Chvatal

Soprano Janet Marie Chvatal was first featured on "Psalmus" (1996). Ms. Chvatal also made significant contributions to Johnson's "Prayers of St. Brendan - The Journey Home" (1998), "Vespers - light into Light" (2005), "Standing Still" (2007, "Journey Prayers" (2009), "Broken, Gazing" (2014), "Lauds" (2020), "Caim" (2021) and a single release of Albert Hay Malotte's "The Lord's Prayer" (2023). Janet also regularly contributed to the Contemporary Celtic releases by Johnson and Brian Dunning. In 2009, Johnson and Chvatal were joined by Dunning and German baritone, Marc Gremm for a concert at Neuschwanstein Castle in Schwangau, Germany. This would lead to the formation of the Coram Deo Ensemble which also featured Portland violinist, Wendy Goodwin. The ensemble were featured on the recordings, "Coram Deo - Vol. 1" (2010) and "Antiphon" (2011).

Phil Keaggy

Jeff Johnson and renowned guitarist Phil Keaggy began a multi-record collaboration in 2009, reconnecting at Laity Lodge on the Frio River in the Texas Hill Country. The two began a unique way of working sending tracks back and forth via the internet. While they have performed together on the WinterSky tour in 2014, the duo have never been in the same room when making their studio recordings. "We send tracks back and forth via the internet. One of us comes up with an initial idea and then formats it to allow the other person to add his bits and then continue with any new ideas", Johnson said in an interview. Those recordings include "Frio Suite", (2009), "WaterSky" (2012), "Cappadocia" (2019), "Ravenna" (2021) and, "Spinning on a Cosmic Dime" (2024). John Diliberto, the host and producer of the syndicated Echoes, has chosen each of the duo's releases as an "Echoes CD of the Month" and writes that "the real place that Johnson and Keaggy create is of the imagination and wonder". He describes their "Spinning on a Cosmic Dime" as "a masterwork of guitar and keyboard orchestrations which will spin you into reverie and dreams".

John Van Deusen

Many of Jeff Johnson's instrumental recordings have been influenced by ambient music. When Jeff met alternative musician John Van Deusen, the two discovered that they shared a mutual love for the genre and soon set out to record "Eremo" (2024). Kevin Belmonte (All Nine) describes the music as "recurring waves of theme and sound, purposeful and lovely".

Other ambient recordings include "A Thin Silence" (2006), which Peter Manzi described in New Age Retailer (January 2007) as "a minimalist and ambient recording of sublime and introspective beauty". Johnson also co-produced ambient guitarist Jeff Pearce's debut, "Tenderness and Fatality" (1993).

Other collaborations

Throughout his career, Johnson has collaborated with various artists and musicians. In 1991, he played with Derri Daugherty (The Choir); jazz players David Friesen and Dave Hagelganz; and rock drummer Mark Schulman. In 2009, he contributed the track "Heaven's Door" for Eckhart Tolle's Music to Quiet the Mind. Johnson's recordings have been licensed and featured on numerous commercials, compilations, spoken word and movie soundtracks including Angela Elwell Hunt's "The Tale of Three Trees", Keith Patman's "Centerpoint: Poetry & Music for Christmas and Scott Cairn's "Parable".

Johnson produced an album of original music for Mercedes-Benz, titled Rhythms of the Road. The company included a CD with every new car sold. In an interview with The High Calling, Johnson said he was contacted by a car owner who totaled her Mercedes, with the CD stuck in the player. 'She was more upset about losing her CD than losing her car,' he said. Johnson sent her another copy."

== Selah contemplative work ==
Selah Service

A Christian contemplative worship service featuring music, prayers, scripture and silence was first established by Jeff with David and Kathy Hastings in 1999. Patterned after the worship of Taizé community and incorporating traditional and contemporary hymns and choruses along with original music composed by Jeff, a series of albums would emerge from his experience of leading this service over the years at churches, retreat centers and on pilgrimage. They include "Benediction" (2002), "Standing Still" (2007), "Journey Prayers" (2009), "Broken, Gazing (2014), "Lauds" (2020) and "Caim" (2021)

Selah Audio Meditations

Johnson released "Selah Audio Meditations - Vol. 1" (2006) and "Selah Audio Meditations - Vol. 2" (2007) featuring prayers by John Phillip Newell and "Selah Audio Meditations 3 - The Way of the Cross" (2009). He created an entire series of these Selah Audio Meditations that can be found in a YouTube compilation.

Selah Video Reflections

In 2020, as an activity during the COVID lockdown, Johnson reached out to friends and fellow artists worldwide to film themselves reading from the Psalms and performing music. Poet, Malcolm Guite collaborated with Johnson, reading related excerpts from his book, "David's Crown: Sounding the Seasons". These reflections were published on YouTube throughout the pandemic.

== Live performances ==
While maintaining an active recording career, Johnson has appeared in concert in a variety of venues throughout the world. He appeared as a solo artist and with Brian Dunning, Stephen Lawhead and saxophonist, Dave Hagelganz in the 1980s at the Cornerstone Festival in Illinois. He also played solo sets during the same years at Greenbelt Festival in the United Kingdom.

Johnson and Dunning toured regularly beginning in the late 1990s joined by various musicians such as violinists, John Fitzpatrick and Wendy Goodwin, guitarist, Tim Ellis, cellist, Jozef Lupták, violist, Gwen Franz and singers, Janet Chvatal and Marc Gremm. Their ensembles appeared at numerous Youth Specialties conferences beginning in the early 2000's and included a command performance in 2009 at Neuschwanstein Castle in Germany. From 2001 through 2019, Johnson and Dunning's ensembles presented "A Celtic Christmas" each winter.

Additionally, Jeff has regularly performed at churches, retreat centers and with pilgrimage groups leading the Selah Service. He has been featured in retreats at Laity Lodge in Texas for many years and continues to lead Selah at St. Aidan's Episcopal Church on Camano Island, WA.

== Discography (partial) ==
Name	Date	In collaboration with
The Face Of The Deep	1980	
Through The Door	1982	Sandy Simpson
Shadow Play	1983	
Icons	1984	
No Shadow Of Turning (Meadowlark)	1985	Sandy Simpson, Dieter Zander & Kathy McClatchy
The Tale of Three Trees	1986	Brian Dunning, Elizabeth Denison Martin
Born Of Water	1986	David Friesen & Dave Hagelganz
The Awakening	1986	Sandy Simpson
Why Should The Heart Not Dance?	1988	Sandy Simpson & Kathy McClatchy
This Mystery I Pose	1988	Sandy Simpson
Pilgrimage	1989	
Similitudes	1990	Dave Hagelganz
Centerpoint - Poetry & Music for Christmas	1990	Dallas McKenno, Brian Dunning
The Stormy Night	1991	Elizabeth Denison Martin
Great Romantics	1991	
Calico Bear	1991	Angela Elwell Hunt, Richard Souther
Songs From Albion 1	1992	Brian Dunning
Songs From Albion 2	1993	Brian Dunning
Songs From Albion 3	1994	Brian Dunning
The Isle Of Dreams	1994	
Psalmus	1996	Janet Chvatal
Navigatio	1997	Janet Chvatal
Prayers Of St. Brendan - The Journey Home	1998	Janet Chvatal, Brian Dunning
A Quiet Knowing – Canticles For The Heart	2000	Brian Dunning & John Fitzpatrick
Byzantium – The Book of Kells & St. Aidan's Journey	2000	Brian Dunning
The Bard and the Warrior	2001	Brian Dunning
A Quiet Knowing Christmas	2001	Brian Dunning & John Fitzpatrick
The Enduring Story – A Retrospective	2001	Brian Dunning
The Memory Tree	2002	
Benediction	2002	Brian Dunning, John Fitzpatrick & Jozef Lupták
Patrick	2003	Brian Dunning
The Katurran Odyssey	2004	Brian Dunning
Stars In The Morning East – A Christmas Meditation	2005	Brian Dunning
Vespers – light into Light	2005	Janet Chvatal
A Thin Silence	2006	
Selah Audio Meditations – Vol. 1 / The Way Of The Cross	2006	
Standing Still	2007	
Selah Audio Meditations – Vol. 2 / The Way Of The Cross	2007	
Dreams Of A Christmas Night (EP)	2007	Brian Dunning
King Raven, Vols. 1 - 3	2008	Brian Dunning
Journey Prayers	2009	
Selah Audio Meditations – Vol. 3 / The Way Of The Cross	2009	
Frio Suite	2009	Phil Keaggy
Under The Wonder Sky	2010	Brian Dunning & Wendy Goodwin
Antiphon	2011	Coram Deo Ensemble (Jeff Johnson, Janet Chvatal, Brian Dunning, Wendy Goodwin & Marc Gremm)
WaterSky	2012	Phil Keaggy
Winterfold	2013	Brian Dunning & Wendy Goodwin
Broken, Gazing	2014	Wendy Goodwin
Parable	2014	Roy Salmond
Two Songs For Holy Week (EP)	2015	
WinterSky Live (EP)	2015	Phil Keaggy, Brian Dunning & Wendy Goodwin
The Grotto Live (EP)	2015	Janet Chvatal, Wendy Goodwin
Home Again (Single)	2015	
Jonathan's Lullaby	2016	
If I Do Not Remember	2016	Brian Dunning & Wendy Goodwin
Eirlandia	2018	Brian Dunning
Lake Song of Innis Free (Single)	2018	Brian Dunning
Cappadocia	2019	Phil Keaggy
Lauds	2020	
Kohelet	2020	Brian Dunning & Wendy Goodwin
Ravenna	2021	Phil Keaggy
Coming, Going (Retrospective)	2022	Brian Dunning
Wintersongs (Retrospective)	2022	Brian Dunning
Nearer My God to Thee (Single)	2023	John Fitzpatrick
The Lord's Prayer (Single)	2023	Janet Chvatal
Eremo	2024	John Van Deusen
Spinning on a Cosmic Dime	2024	Phil Keaggy
A Cinematic Orchestra	2025	
Circle Me: Selah Songs	2026	

== What reviewers say ==
"Johnsons's music has been dubbed 'intelligent pop', 'new age', and 'jazz lite' — but he is quick to point out that his records have nothing to do with the New Age movement. "I was doing my style of music before anybody was talking about the New Age Movement."

— Bob Longman Jr

"Sample any of his 50 albums that he has recorded and sold through Ark Records, and you'll hear hints of Irish folk, modern pop, jazz, mystical world music, and historical Christmas tunes. He's recorded concept albums based on Stephen Lawhead books, ancient prayers, and iconic figures. All of this variety isn't just to be clever; rather it's a celebration of the many nuances that good music can absorb."

— The High Calling (2013)

"There is thought and purpose behind every note here that makes you feel like you see different shades of nature while floating along a river."

— Matt Crosslin, Review of Water Sky

"Cascadian artist Jeff Johnson cites Celtic spirituality as one of the greatest influences on his music, because of its deep connection to the natural world."

— Forrest Inslee

"I have often found myself mesmerized by the rich tapestries of keyboards, flute and violin woven together with the elegance of Celtic filigree, sometimes blended with moving vocals characterizing the thoughts of the sojourner. Many times I've been carried to a place of prayer and the presence of God through the music of Jeff Johnson, together with fellow musicians Brian Dunning, John Fitzpatrick and others. The journey has always been a good one, with many expressions, much like life itself."

— Aimee Herd for Worship Musician Magazine

"Johnson's richly exotic keyboards and production is full of wonderfully organic backdrops for the incredible improvisational skills of Dunning (flute) and Fitzpatrick (violin), along with Slovakian cellist, Jozef Lupák and classical singer, Janet Chvatal."

— Valley Entertainment, review of The Katurran Odyssey-

== See also ==
- List of ambient music artists
