= Relativity (band) =

- Genres: Scottish traditional music Irish traditional music
- Years active: 1985–1987
- Labels: Green Linnet
- Past members: Phil Cunningham; Johnny Cunningham; Tríona Ní Dhomhnaill; Mícheál Ó Domhnaill

Relativity was a Scots-Irish quartet formed in 1985 consisting of two Scottish brothers and an Irish brother and sister. The four members of the band were brothers Johnny Cunningham (fiddle) and Phil Cunningham (accordion, keyboard, whistle, bodhran), and Irish sister and brother Tríona Ní Dhomhnaill (vocals, clavinet) and Mícheál Ó Domhnaill (vocals, guitar, keyboard). Each of the members enjoyed a flourishing solo career at the time Relativity was formed.

== Discography ==
- Relativity (1985)
- Gathering Pace (1987)
