= Idir an Dá Sholas =

Studio album by Maighread Ní Dhomhnaill, Tríona Ní Dhomhnaill & Dónal Lunny
- Released: 1999
- Recorded: 1999
- Genre: Irish traditional Folk; Celtic
- Label: Gael-Linn
- Producer: Dónal Lunny

Idir an Dá Sholas (Between the Two Lights) is a music album by Irish musicians Maighread Ní Dhomhnaill, Tríona Ní Dhomhnaill and Dónal Lunny. It was released worldwide in 1999.

== Track listing ==
1. "Spanish Lady"
2. "Liostail Mé le Sáirsint"
3. "Dónall Óg"
4. "Banks of Claudy"
5. "Bruach Na Carraige Báine"
6. "Níl Sé Ina Lá"
7. "Méilte Cheann Dubhrann"
8. "Ar a Ghabháil 'un a' Chuain Dom"
9. "Foireann an Bháid"
10. "Faoitín"
11. "Pill, Pill, a Rúin"
12. "Tidy Ann"
