= Nightnoise (album) =

Studio album by Billy Oskay and Mícheál Ó Domhnaill
- Released: 1984
- Recorded: 1983
- Genre: Irish traditional Celtic; Chamber music Jazz
- Length: 43 minutes
- Label: Windham Hill Records
- Producer: Billy Oskay; Mícheál Ó Domhnaill

Billy Oskay and Mícheál Ó Domhnaill chronology
Nightnoise (1984)	Something of Time (1987)

Nightnoise is a studio album released by Billy Oskay and Mícheál Ó Domhnaill.

== Track listing ==
1. "Nightnoise" by Billy Oskay (4:17)
2. "The 19A" by Mícheál Ó Domhnaill (3:08)
3. "Bridges" by Mícheál Ó Domhnaill (7:43)
4. "False Spring" by Billy Oskay and D. Bottemiller (4:12)
5. "Duo" by Billy Oskay (3:32)
6. "City Nights" by Billy Oskay (3:26)
7. "After Five" by Mícheál Ó Domhnaill (3:12)
8. "Menucha (A Place With Water)" by Billy Oskay (4:33)
9. "The American Lass" by Mícheál Ó Domhnaill (3:05)
10. "The Cricket's Wicket" by Mícheál Ó Domhnaill (6:16)

== Credits ==
- Billy Oskay – piano (4,6,8), violin, viola, engineer, producer
- Mícheál Ó Domhnaill – guitar, whistler, piano, harmonium (3,7,9,10), assistant engineer, producer
- Tommy Thompson – bass (1,6)
- Anne Robinson – graphic design
- Steve Harper – cover photography
- Steve Miller – engineer mix consultant
- Mike Moore – engineer mix
- Cricket – itself
- Recorded during 1983 at the home of Billy Oskay, Portland, OR
- Mixed in February 1984 at Recording Associates, Portland, OR
- Original mastering by Bernie Grundman Mastering, Hollywood, CA
- Special thanks to Windell Oskay, Peggy Feindt, Tom Bocci, Barry Poss, Steven Miller, and Mike Moore
- Instruments: 1962 viola and 1964 violin by William F. Oskay, 1977 guitar by Kenny White, Yamaha C7D grand piano, harmonium, and whistles
