= Maighread Ní Dhomhnaill =

Irish singer (born 1955)

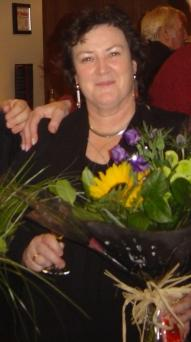
- Maighread in Cork, 2005

Background information
- Born: Maighréad Ní Dhomhnaill; 1955 (age 70–71); Kells, County Meath, Ireland
- Genres: Irish traditional Celtic; Folk
- Occupation: Singer
- Years active: 1969–present
- Label: Gael-Linn Records

Maighread Ní Dhomhnaill (Irish pronunciation: [ˈmˠəiɾʲəd̪ˠ n̠ʲiː ˈɣoːnˠəl̠ʲ]; born 1955) is an Irish traditional singer from Kells, County Meath. She is known for her work with the short-lived, but very highly regarded Skara Brae and her collaborations with her sister Tríona Ní Dhomhnaill, as well as other traditional musicians. She has recorded and performed with the West Ocean String Quartet (WOSQ).

With her sister, Moya Brennan and Mairéad Ní Mhaonaigh, she is part of the Celtic supergroup T with the Maggies, which has released a CD in October 2010.

== Background ==
Ní Dhomhnaill was brought up in Kells. In the 1930s, some Irish-speaking families were relocated to Meath as part of a government scheme to create a new Gaeltacht area near Dublin). Her father's family were native Irish-speakers from Rann na Feirste, County Donegal and she was therefore brought up speaking the language, along with her sister Tríona and brothers Éamonn, Mícheál and Conall.

Ní Dhomhnaill comes from one of Ireland's best-known musical families. Her father was a well-known song collector and songwriter and her aunt, Néillí Ní Dhomhnaill, was a collector of traditional songs.

== Musical career ==
Ní Dhomhnaill first came to prominence as a member of Skara Brae. The other members of the group were Mícheál Ó Domhnaill (her brother), Tríona Ní Dhomhnaill (her sister) and Dáithí Sproule from Derry. The group's only recording remains a classic. "They were the first traditional songs done to guitars – it was the first time the pop music thing was brought to the Irish language. It would be lovely if people knew where it all started. I pressurised Gael Linn to reissue the album. I was on a mission."

The songs on her solo albums are mostly sung in Irish. Mícheál and Triona accompanied her on the albums No Dowry and 'Idir an da Sholas'.

Her first album was issued in 1976 under the name Mairéad Ní Dhomhnaill, but since then she has reverted to the original spelling of her first name, "Maighread". She has also previously used the spelling "Maighréad", but has removed the accented e.

== Personal life ==
Ní Dhomhnaill studied nursing and raised a family, giving up music for a while. She looked after her two children in Dublin, and worked part-time on nights as a theatre nurse in Mount Carmel hospital in Dublin. "I loved theatre," she said.

Maighread Ní Dhomhnaill is married to Cathal Goan, the former Director-General of Raidió Teilifís Éireann.

== Discography ==
Solo albums

- Maighréad Ní Dhomnaill (1976)
- Gan Dhá Phingin Spré (No Dowry) (1991)
- Idir an Dá Sholas with Tríona Ní Dhomhnaill and Dónal Lunny (1999)
- Ceol Cheann Dubhrann (Various artists, 2009)
- Ae Fond Kiss with the West Ocean String Quartet
- T with the Maggies (2010)
