= Nightnoise =

Irish music ensemble

- Nightnoise in Seville, Spain, 1990

Background information
- Origin: Ireland
- Genres: Irish traditional; Classical; Celtic; Jazz; Ambient; Chamber music
- Years active: 1984–2003
- Label: Windham Hill
- Past members: Mícheál Ó Domhnaill (1984-2003); Billy Oskay (1984-1992); Brian Dunning (1987-2003); Tríona Ní Dhomhnaill (1987-2003); Johnny Cunningham (1993-1997); John Fitzpatrick (1997-2003)

Nightnoise was a music ensemble active from 1984 to 1997. Their original blend of Irish traditional music, Celtic music, jazz, and classical chamber music inspired a generation of Irish musicians. They released seven albums on the Windham Hill label.

== Origins ==
The origins of Nightnoise can be traced to the Bothy Band (disbanded in 1979), who made a name in Ireland and internationally with a lively fiddle-based sound that brought Irish music into the mainstream. One of the band's founders, guitarist Mícheál Ó Domhnaill, came from a long line of Irish musicians, and was considered one of the finest performers of traditional Irish music.

In 1983, after seven years with the Bothy Band and several years collaborating with the master fiddler Kevin Burke, Ó Domhnaill began searching for a new project and a new sound. He met Billy Oskay in Portland, Oregon, and the two began a new collaboration focused on a new and innovative music that integrated Celtic, jazz, and classical chamber music.

Billy Oskay was born in Kingston, New York, and had developed an international reputation as a violinist. He started playing violin at seven and went on to study under Eugen Prokop at the International Academy of Music Palma de Mallorca in Spain. He excelled equally in violin technique and composition. He graduated from the esteemed academy with a degree in violin and chamber music.

Nightnoise began as a collaboration between this American violinist and Irish guitarist who sought to create a unique blend of musical forms. Together, they composed and recorded some songs in Oskay's Portland home and were pleased with the result. Ó Domhnaill secured a contract with William Ackerman at Windham Hill Records, the tracks they recorded were mixed and released in 1984 under the title Nightnoise. The album represented a real departure from Ó Domhnaill's Bothy Band roots, and the mellow, ambient instrumental style incorporating jazz and classical elements and forms full of spirituality almost defined what would be called New Age music.

== 1987–1990 ==
Three years later, Mícheál's sister, Irish pianist and vocalist Tríona Ní Dhomhnaill, who performed with her brother in Skara Brae, Relativity, and the Bothy Band, and Irish-American flutist Brian Dunning (flautist) joined the original duo. Nightnoise, the band, was born. The quartet's first album Something of Time, was released by Windham Hill in 1987. It was followed by At the End of the Evening (1988), The Parting Tide (1990). This would be the last album to feature the playing and writing of Billy Oskay, who chose to follow his dream of owning his own recording studio, Big Red Studio.

== 1991–1997 ==
Following Oskay's departure, Scottish fiddler Johnny Cunningham, a former member of Silly Wizard who had played with Tríona and Mícheál in the band Relativity, took over Oskay's duties. The band took on a much more Irish-centric sound, while still retaining their own signature style. The revamped Nightnoise went on to release the albums Shadow of Time (1994) and A Different Shore (1995), and a collaboration with Japanese singer Mimori Yusa in her album Mizu Iro (Water Blue) (1994).

Nightnoise's last album, The White Horse Sessions (1997), featured live concert performances mixed in with in-studio live performances, with their Windham Hill colleagues as their audience. The album also featured original material only available in this live format (the songs "Heartwood", "Do We", and "Murdo of the Moon"), as well as a cover of Van Morrison's classic "Moondance". This album marked the end of the band's contractual obligations to Windham Hill, and they decided to relocate to Ireland, going on hiatus while they each focused on their own projects.

== 1997–2003 ==
The White Horse Sessions proved to be the last Nightnoise album. Cunningham left the band following its release, and was replaced by Irish fiddler John Fitzpatrick. In a 1999 interview, Mícheál Ó Domhnaill stated that Nightnoise had not broken up, and that the band would be getting together again shortly. The band did indeed record new material from 1997 to 2002 (both original compositions and covers of classic songs), but they were all made for albums other than their own. Nightnoise officially disbanded towards the end of 2003.

Johnny Cunningham died on 15 December 2003, from a heart attack. He was 46 years old. Mícheál Ó Domhnaill died from a heart attack in July 2006 at his home in Dublin, Ireland, at the age of 54. Dunning died on 10 February 2022, at the age of 70. John Fitzpatrick died in July 2023, at the age of 55.

== Nightnoise members ==
- Billy Oskay (1984–1992) – violin, viola, piano, harmonium, keyboards
- Mícheál Ó Domhnaill (1984–2003) – guitar, banjo, mandolin, tin whistle, piano, keyboards, harmonica, harmonium, synthesizer, and vocals
- Tríona Ní Dhomhnaill (1987–2003) – vocals, piano, keyboards, synthesizer, harpsichord, whistle, and accordion
- Brian Dunning (1987–2003) – flute, alto flute, panpipes, panflute, whistle, accordion, vocals, and synthesizer
- Johnny Cunningham (1993–1997) – fiddle, vocals
- John Fitzpatrick (1997–2003) – violin

== Discography ==
=== Studio albums ===
- Nightnoise (by Billy Oskay and Mícheál Ó Domhnaill) (1984)
- Something of Time (1987)
- At the End of the Evening (1988)
- The Parting Tide (1990)
- Shadow of Time (1993)
- A Different Shore (1995)
- The White Horse Sessions (1997)

=== Compilation album contributions ===
Like many longtime Windham Hill artists, Nightnoise contributed otherwise unreleased tracks to the label's various-artists compilation albums.

- "Nollaig" (Mícheál Ó Domhnaill, Billy Oskay) on A Winter's Solstice (1985)
- "'Bring Me Back a Song'" (Mícheál Ó Domhnaill) (alternate mix) on A Winter's Solstice II (1988)
- "Sicilienne" (Faure) on The Impressionists (1992)
- "Wexford Carol" (Traditional) on A Winter's Solstice IV (1993)
- "Bouree" (Bach) on The Bach Variations (1994)
- Mizu Iro (Water Blue), album by Mimori Yusa (1994)
- "The Sussex Carol" (Traditional) on A Winter's Solstice V (1995)
- "Gott im Fruhling" (Schubert) on The Romantics (1995)
- "Bríd Og Ní Mháille" (Traditional) on Celtic Christmas II (1996)
- "Medley: Hark, the Herald Angels Sing / Angels We Have Heard on High" (Traditional) on The Carols of Christmas (1996)
- "Suantrai" (Nightnoise) on On a Starry Night (1997)
- "Lully Lullay" (Traditional) on Celtic Christmas III (1997)
- "Dreamtime" (Tríona Ní Dhomhnaill, Brian Dunning) on A Winter Solstice Reunion (1998)
- "Whiter Than Snow" (Tríona Ní Dhomhnaill) on Celtic Christmas IV (1998)
- "No Room at the Inn" (Nightnoise) on Celtic Christmas: Peace on Earth (1999)
- "The Flight Into Egypt" (Traditional) on Celtic Christmas: Peace on Earth (1999)
- "New Trees at Knockaun" (Brian Dunning) on Simple Gifts (2000)
- "Ar Pont Nevez" (Nightnoise) on Celtic Christmas (Silver Anniversary Edition) (2001)
- "The Holly and the Ivy" (Traditional) on A Windham Hill Christmas (2002)

== See also ==
- List of ambient music artists
