= Paddy Glackin =

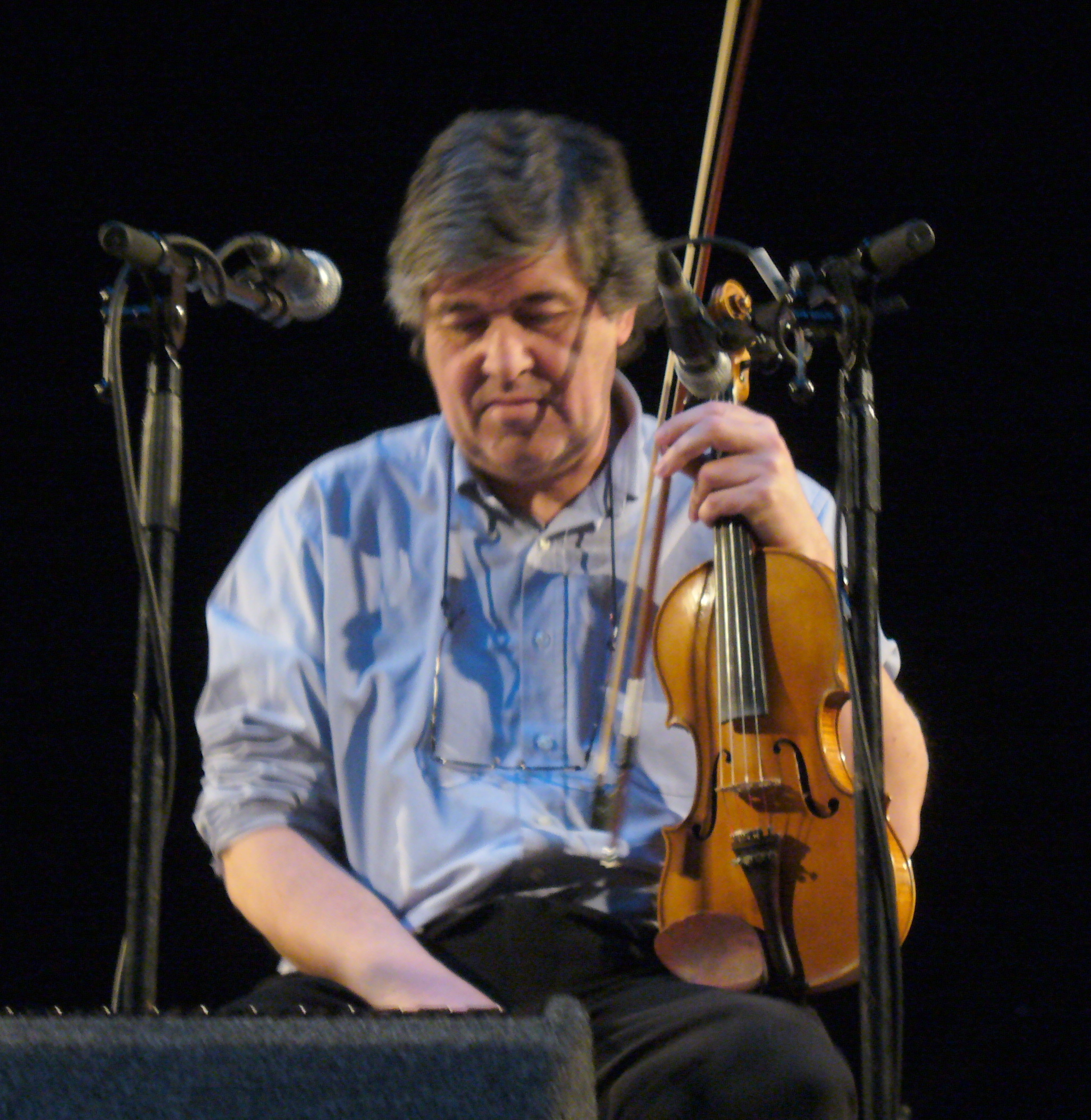
- Paddy Glackin, 2011

Background information
- Born: 5 August 1954 (age 72); Clontarf, Dublin, Ireland
- Genres: Irish traditional music
- Occupation: Musician
- Instrument: Fiddle
- Years active: 1973–present
- Labels: Gael-Linn Records; Tara Music

Paddy Glackin (born 5 August 1954) is an Irish fiddler and founding member of the Bothy Band. He is considered one of Ireland's leading traditional fiddle players.

== Biography ==
Paddy Glackin was born on 5 August 1954 in Clontarf, Dublin. His father, Tom Glackin, was from The Rosses and was an officer with the Garda Síochána in Dublin; Tom was a notable fiddle player who instilled in Paddy a deep interest and love of the music of his native County Donegal, and taught him and his brothers Kevin and Seamus to play the instrument. As a result of his father's influence, Paddy was playing fiddle in the 'Donegal style' by the age of six. During his primary school years, he took classical violin lessons at the College of Music in Chatham Row in Dublin, which gave him an important technical grounding in music and helped develop his formidable technique. His playing style, however, was developed more informally at home, where his father organized regular Wednesday afternoon music sessions with many musicians, including Seamus Carroll, Larry Redigan and Frank O'Higgins. Seamus Carroll was particularly encouraging and helpful, teaching Paddy the techniques of Sligo-style fiddling.

While on a trip to Donegal with his father, music collector Breandan Breathnach, and Clare fiddle player John Kelly, Paddy encountered the music of the legendary travelling fiddler John Doherty, who would have a profound influence on the young musician. Glackin frequently cites Doherty as his main influence. Paddy's musical influences, however, are not limited to Donegal; he also cites fiddlers such as John Kelly, Tommy Potts and Padraig O'Keeffe as important in shaping his overall approach. Through the influence of his father and these talented fiddlers, Paddy began to master a variety of Irish styles and amass a significant repertoire. In 1973, the nineteen-year-old Paddy became fiddle champion at the All-Ireland Fleadh Cheoil.

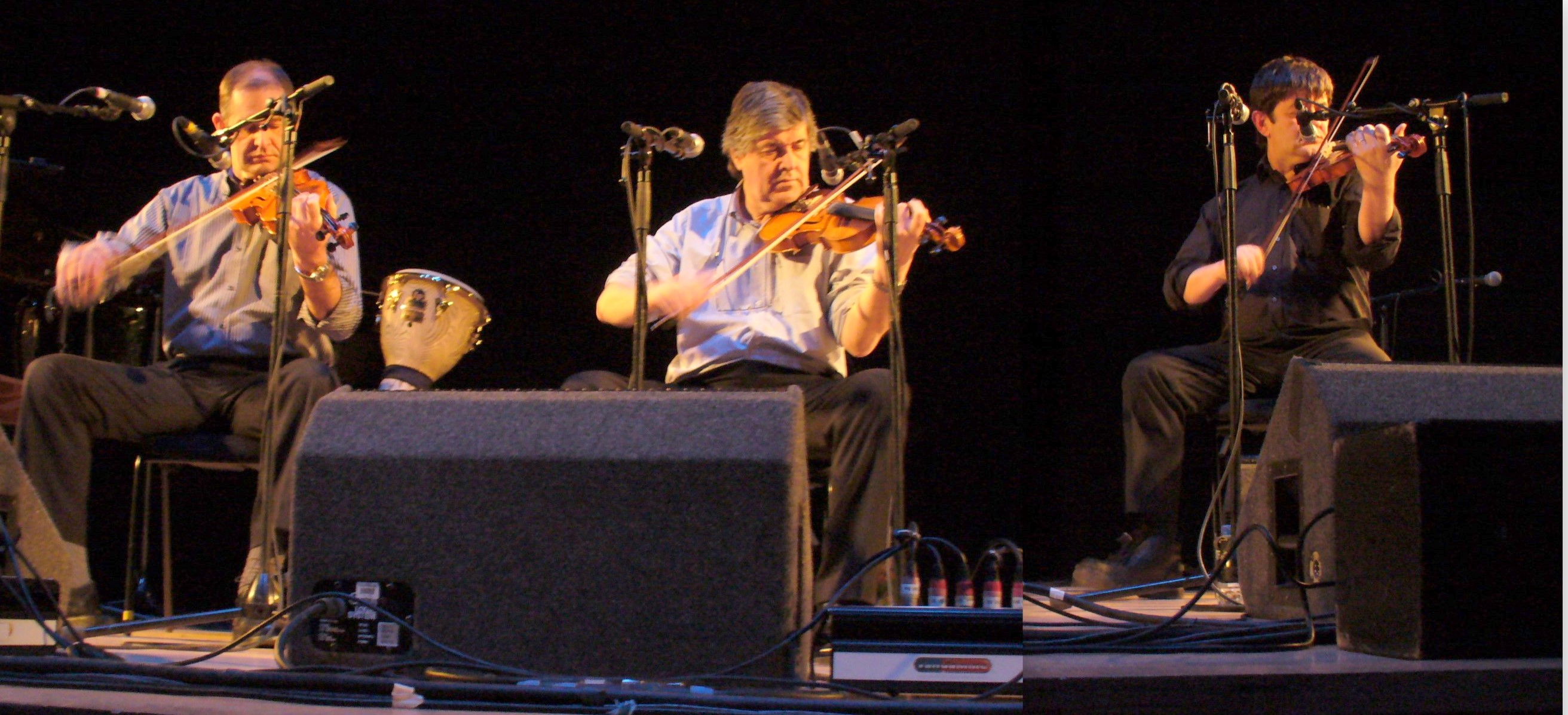
The Glackins, 2011

During his college years in Dublin, the city's vibrant traditional music scene offered Glackin opportunities to meet fellow players his own age and perform a wide variety of venues. He became friends accordionist Tony MacMahon, flautist Matt Molloy, uilleann piper Paddy Keenan, brother and sister Mícheál Ó Domhnaill and Tríona Ní Dhomhnaill, and Dónal Lunny—all of whom would go on to prominent careers in Irish traditional music. Together they formed the group Seachtar, later renamed The Bothy Band, which would become one of the leading traditional bands in Ireland. The Bothy Band played a vital role in energising the Irish traditional music scene in the 1970s. After playing with the Bothy Band for eighteen months, Glackin decided to leave the popular group due to the demands of recording and touring:

It just wasn't for me and I certainly never wanted to do the album, tour, album, tour thing. I can see the need for doing it, but I always found it a little false. When I go out to play, it's on my own terms. I look forward to it and I really enjoy doing it.

Glackin took a job as an archivist and as Traditional Music Officer for the Irish Arts Council. He later transitioned into the broadcasting business, taking a position with RTÉ radio as a sports producer, presenter, and eventually editor. While maintaining his profession in RTÉ, Paddy continued to perform and record Irish music. In 1977, he recorded the first of several solo albums for the Gael Linn label. Simply titled Glackin, the album features several tracks recorded with his father Tom and his brothers Kevin and Séamus; it is still considered a classic in the genre. His brothers would later release an acclaimed duet recording titled Northern Lights. Glackin has since released numerous recordings, including seminal ones such as Doublin (1978) with the piper Paddy Keenan and In Full Spate (1991) with Dónal Lunny. More recently, Glackin recorded the duet album Seidean Si (1995) with piper Robbie Hannon, and Reprise (2001) with his former Bothy Band colleague, the late Mícheál Ó Domhnaill.

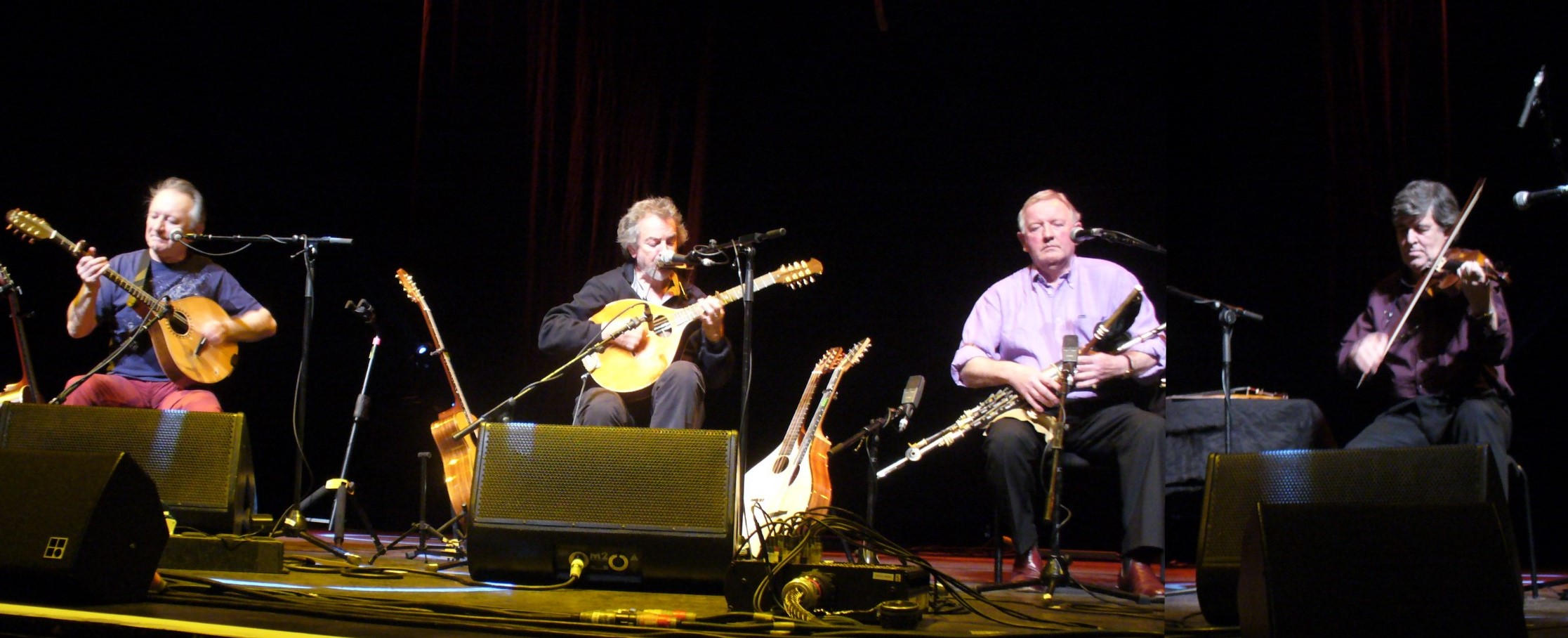
Donal Lunny, Andy Irvine, Liam O'Flynn, and Paddy Glackin at Celtic Connections, 2012

Although Glackin is quite outspoken in his preference for a pure soloist approach to the tradition, he has been involved in a number of experimental recordings, including Roaratorio by the American avant-garde composer John Cage and Hidden Ground, a recording from 1980 made with the late multi-instrumentalist Jolyon Jackson which is notable for its use of synthesizers alongside Glackin's pure traditional fiddle playing. This recording anticipated the trend for mixing traditional Irish music with synthesizers.

Glackin continues to perform, and he teaches annually at the Willie Clancy Summer School in Clare.

== Discography ==
Solo and collaborations

- Ceoltoiri Laighean: The Crooked Road (1973) by Paddy Glackin and others, Gael-Linn CEF 035
- Ceoltoiri Laighean: The Star of Munster (1975) by Paddy Glackin and others, Gael-Linn CEF 047
- Glackin: Ceol Ar An Bhfidil Le Paddy Glackin (1977) by Paddy Glackin, Gael-Linn CEF 060
- Doublin (1978) by Paddy Glackin and Paddy Keenan, Tara 2007
- An Fhidil, Vol. 2 (1980) by Paddy Glackin and others, Gael-Linn CEF 069
- The Flags of Dublin (1980) by Paddy Glackin, Mick Gavin, Michael O'Brien, Topic 12TS383
- Hidden Ground (1980) by Paddy Glackin and Jolyon Jackson, Tara 2009
- In Full Spate (1991) by Paddy Glackin, Gael-Linn CEFCD 153
- Seidean Si [The Whirlwind] (1995) by Paddy Glackin and Robbie Hannan, Gael-Linn CEFCD 171
- Na Connerys: Celtic Sessions (1997) by Paddy Glackin and others, Honest HON CD 3006
- Na Connerys: Part 2, Fire in Our Hearts (c 1998–99) by Paddy Glackin and others, Celtic Note CNCD 1003
- Reprise (2001) by Paddy Glackin and Mícheál Ó Domhnaill, Gael-Linn CEFCD 180
- Andy Irvine/70th Birthday Concert at Vicar St 2012 (2014)
- Ushers Island (2017) by Paddy Glackin, Andy Irvine, Dónal Lunny, Mike McGoldrick, John Doyle

Guest appearances

- Tríona (1975) by Triona Ni Dhomhnaill, Gael-Linn CEF 043
- Paddy Keenan (1975) by Paddy Keenan, Gael-Linn CEF 045
- A Kiss in the Morning Early (1976) by Mick Hanly, Mulligan LUN 005
- Roaratorio (1980) by John Cage, Mode 28/29
- As I Went Over Blackwater (1980) by Mick Hanly, Mulligan LUN 040
- Over the Moor to Maggie (1980) by Oisín, Tara 2012, 1980
- Cry of the Mountain (1981) by Michael O'Suilleabhain, Gael-Linn CEF 079
- The Jeannie-C (1982) by Oisín, Tara 2013
- Let Down the Blade (1999) by John Regan, BeaumeX BMCD 571

== Sources ==
- Cranitch, Matt (1988). The Irish Fiddle Book. Ossian.
- Feldman, Allen and O'Doherty, Eamonn (1979). The Northern Fiddler. Oak Publications.
- MacAoidh, Caoimhin (1995). Between the Jigs and the Reels. Drumlin Publications.
- Vallely, Fintan (1999). The Companion to Traditional Irish Music. Cork University Press.

== External reference ==
- Paddy Glackin at AllMusic
