= Mícheál Ó Domhnaill =

Irish singer & musician (1951–2006)

- Mícheál Ó Domhnaill, 1979

Background information
- Born: Mícheál Seosamh Ó Domhnaill; 7 October 1951; Kells, County Meath, Ireland
- Died: 7 July 2006 (aged 54) Dundrum, Dublin, Ireland
- Genres: Irish traditional, Celtic, folk
- Occupations: Musician, composer, producer
- Instruments: Guitar, vocals, banjo, mandolin, piano, organ, tin whistle, harmonium, harmonica
- Years active: 1971–2006
- Website: www.michealodomhnaill.com

Mícheál Ó Domhnaill (Irish pronunciation: [ˈmʲiːçaːl̪ˠ oː ˈd̪ˠoːnˠəl̠ʲ]; 7 October 1951 – 7 July 2006) was an Irish singer, guitarist, composer, and producer who was a major influence on Irish traditional music in the second half of the twentieth century. He is remembered for his innovative work with Skara Brae, the first group to record vocal harmonization in Irish language songs, and The Bothy Band, one of the most influential groups in Irish traditional music. His reputation was enhanced by a successful collaboration with master fiddler Kevin Burke, and his work with the Celtic groups Relativity and Nightnoise, which achieved significant commercial and critical acclaim.

Ó Domhnaill was raised in Kells, County Meath, Ireland and spent his summers in the Donegal Gaeltacht (Irish-speaking) area of Rann na Feirste, where the Irish language is the main spoken language. He inherited a deep love and understanding of Irish culture and Irish traditional music from his parents. In Donegal, Mícheál spent time with his aunt Neilí, a renowned singer who had a vast repertoire of Irish and English songs. He formed lifelong friendships with Pól and Ciarán Brennan (future members of Clannad) and Dáithí Sproule (future member of Skara Brae and Altan).

== Early years ==
Mícheál Seosamh Ó Domhnaill was born 7 October 1951 in Kells, County Meath, Ireland. His father, Aodh, was a teacher, a singer, and a collector of traditional music for the Irish Folklore Commission. His mother, Bríd, was a choral singer. Mícheál's father was raised in the Donegal Gaeltacht (Irish-speaking) area of Rann na Feirste, where the Irish language is the main spoken language. Mícheál, his two sisters, Maighréad and Tríona, and two brothers, Éamon and Conall, inherited a deep love and understanding of Irish culture from their parents. The family spent their summers in Rann na Feirste learning the Irish language and Irish traditional music. During these summers in Donegal, Mícheál and his siblings spent time with their aunt Neilí, a renowned singer who had a vast repertoire of Irish and English songs. They also formed lifelong friendships with Pól and Ciarán Brennan (future members of Clannad) and Dáithí Sproule (future member of Skara Brae and Altan).

Mícheál's musical literacy was encouraged throughout his early years. At the age of six, he started taking piano lessons from the Kells nuns, which left a lasting influence on him. He also sang in a choir founded by his father. At the age of twelve, Mícheál suffered an appendicitis. To ease the boredom of his recuperation, a religious brother who taught at Mícheál's school gave him a guitar. By the age of sixteen, Mícheál began devoting his musical energies to the guitar. Throughout his early years, he and his sisters Tríona and Maighréad continued to sing the Irish songs together in close harmony. With their father's advice to "listen across one another" to pick up subtle shifts in harmony, the siblings developed a seamless texture to their singing. Tríona would later recall, "We could just look at each other in the midst of a song, and that look would communicate so much. When you've close family ties, it's instinctive."

== Skara Brae ==
In the late 1960s, Mícheál and his sister Tríona began attending University College Dublin, where they met up with singer-guitarist Dáithi Sproule (future member of Altan) from Derry. They began performing together around Dublin, producing "beautiful, adventurous" arrangements of Irish Gaelic songs. In the summer of 1970, Mícheál and Dáithi performed as the house band at Teach Hiudaí Beag in Gaoth Dobhair (Gweedore), Donegal. Later that year, Mícheál, Tríona, Maighread, and Dáithi formed the group Skara Brae, a name suggested by Mícheál in reference to Skara Brae, an archaeological site in the Orkney Islands in Scotland consisting of a bleak stone village built in the second millennium BC.

In 1971, Skara Brae released an eponymous album of "beautifully performed Gaelic songs" on Gael Linn Records. It was notable as the first recording to include vocal harmonisation in Irish language songs. In 2004, Ó Domhnaill described the influences on the group in an interview with the RTÉ radio program Rattlebag:

Once a year we'd go up and we'd meet the Derry lads, and we'd form great bonds and they had a great interest in the language and love for it, and as did we, and we kind of sparked off each other. And we used to go down to the lake after classes and we'd sing. We'd sing Beatles songs, but we'd also sing Irish songs. And experiment with chords. We learned a lot from the Beatles. We listened a lot to them and all the music that was happening at the time and we tried to bring that to bear ... on the Irish.

Skara Brae's version of "Tá mé 'mo shuí" shows the unique influence of Rann na Feirste. The song is performed differently in other parishes of the same area. The four voices are skilfully supported by Triona's harpsichord, and the unique guitar work of Mícheál and Dáithi. Mícheál in fact was one of the first guitar players, along with Dáithí, in Irish traditional music to employ DADGAD tuning. His guitar style had a dramatic impact on guitarists who followed in the genre. Both Mícheál and Dáithí were influenced in their early years by John Renbourn and Bert Jansch.

In 1973, while playing the club circuit in Ireland and still a student at University College Dublin, Ó Domhnaill met Mick Hanly, a Limerick-born singer, guitarist, and dulcimer player, and soon the two formed a duo called Monroe. Playing a mixture of Irish, English, and Scottish ballads, many sung in Irish and Scottish Gaelic, Monroe's music centered on acoustic guitars, dulcimer, and voices, with "Hanly's brusque tones complimenting Mícheál's lower-key vocals". As Monroe, Hanly and Ó Domhnaill toured Brittany often, meeting with other local and visiting Irish musicians. During this time, Brittany was enjoying a major folk revival, with artists like Alan Stivell, Tri Yann, and Sonnerien Du just emerging onto the scene.

After graduating from the University College Dublin in 1973 with a degree in Celtic Studies, he took a position with the Irish Folklore Commission collecting songs in Donegal. During that time he met many singers and musicians who shared his love of Irish traditional music. He played regularly at the Tabairne Hiudai Beag's and spent long hours with his aunt Neilí, learning and documented over 200 traditional songs she had collected and been singing for years. Many of the songs he would later record he first learned from Neilí during his childhood and from this time of learning.

In 1974, when he was just twenty two years old, Mícheál became the first presenter of the RTÉ radio program The Long Note, which featured Irish traditional musicians, many of whom had never previously been recorded. In 1974, Hanly and Ó Domhnaill recorded a single, "The Hills of Greenmore", and toured with the group Planxty as their supporting act. After enlisting the help of some of the members of Planxty—Liam O'Flynn, Dónal Lunny, and Matt Molloy—Hanly and Ó Domhnaill signed a deal with Polydor Records and recorded the album, Celtic Folkweave, which would later be called a "seminal" album and a "predecessor to The Bothy Band".

== The Bothy Band ==
In late 1974, Ó Domhnaill co-founded The Bothy Band, along with Matt Molloy (flute and tin whistle), Paddy Keenan (uilleann pipes and tin whistle), Dónal Lunny (bouzouki, guitar, and production), Paddy Glackin (fiddle), and his sister Tríona Ní Dhomhnaill (harpsichord, clavinet and vocals). Paddy Glackin was later replaced by Tommy Peoples, who was then replaced by Kevin Burke in May 1976. The Bothy Band were together for five years, and they performed Irish traditional music. They were an enthusiastic band with a focus on musical virtuosity.

On 2 February 1975, the Bothy Band made its debut at Trinity College Dublin. The Bothy Band recorded three studio albums during their career: The Bothy Band (1975), Old Hag You Have Killed Me (1976), and Out of the Wind – Into the Sun (1977). A live album After Hours was released in 1979.

In 1979, the group disbanded, but the former members went on to play influential roles in the development of Irish traditional music. Lunny returned for a while to Planxty and then helped to form the Celtic rock band Moving Hearts. He continued his work as a producer, working with artists like Andy M. Stewart. Tríona Ní Dhomhnaill moved to the United States and formed the short-lived band Touchstone. She later joined her brother to form both Relativity and Nightnoise.

== Kevin Burke and America ==
Upon the dissolution of the Bothy Band, Ó Domhnaill and fiddler Kevin Burke formed a duo and recorded the album Promenade (1979). Co-produced by Ó Domhnaill and Gerry O'Beirne for Mulligan Records, the album has been called "one of the finest duets ever recorded in Irish traditional music". In contrast to the "propulsive power and bracing brinkmanship" produced by the Bothy Band, the duo set off on a different musical path that one reviewer from the Irish Echo called "soulful finesse".

Their sound was unrushed, detailed, spellbindingly beautiful, yet still pulsing with vitality. For tunes, it was the ultimate rhythmic glide, smooth rather than slick, without a hint of coasting. For songs, it was respect and reflection conveyed with absolute conviction.

The album's centerpiece and single was "Lord Franklin", which featured Ó Domhnaill's lilting vocals in English. He sang two other songs on the album in Irish. Ó Domhnaill's guitar playing and Burke's Sligo-style Irish fiddling achieved a "relaxed vitality" through "compelling melodies, pulsing Sligo rhythms, intricate variations, and vocal perfection".

In 1980, Ó Domhnaill and Burke moved to the United States where they toured extensively throughout the country. In 1982, they released their second album, Portland, on Green Linnet Records, which was received with equal enthusiasm by Irish traditional music critics. Reviewers singled out the "tender, baring passion" of Ó Domhnaill's voice in his renditions of "Eirigh a Shiuir" and "Aird Ui Chumhaing".

He treated traditional songs in Irish as the enduring testament of history handed down by those who experienced it rather than merely documented it. His acoustic guitar playing was, like himself, unobtrusive yet intense, focused on gimmick-free impact and ever-mindful that it must support, not supplant, Burke's melodic fiddling.

While touring in Portland, Oregon in 1980, Ó Domhnaill met a young American woman, Peg Johnson, and the two soon began a romantic relationship. After dating for two years, they were married and settled into a house in Portland, where Ó Domhnaill lived for the next fourteen years.

== Nightnoise ==
In 1983, after seven years with the Bothy Band and several years collaborating with the master fiddler Kevin Burke, Ó Domhnaill began searching for a new project and a new sound. He met Billy Oskay in Portland, and the two began a new collaboration focused on a new and innovative music that integrated traditional Irish, jazz, and classical chamber music. This collaboration between the American violinist and Irish guitarist created a unique blend of musical forms. Together, they composed and recorded songs in Oskay's Portland home and were pleased with the result.

In late 1983, Ó Domhnaill's music career was altered when William Ackerman at Windham Hill Records heard one of the tracks recorded at Oskay's home.

I guess we were doing the soundtrack for Country at the time and Tom Bocci, who was in publishing at Disney, said hey listen, I've got this thing that I think you might be interested in. And he played a little of it for me and I said God, there's something in here that's really familiar to me. And he said, well do you know The Bothy Band. And I just went nuts. And he said this is Mícheál, you know, and I said God, great, I love it. So get me more.

Ackerman soon offered Ó Domhnaill and Oskay a contract with Windham Hill Records. The tracks they recorded at Oskay's home were mixed and released in 1984 on their album Nightnoise. The album represented a real departure from Ó Domhnaill's Bothy Band roots, and the mellow, ambient instrumental style incorporating jazz and classical elements and forms full of spirituality almost defined what would be called New Age music.

In 1985, Mícheál and his sister Tríona (vocals, clavinet) joined the two Scottish brothers Phil Cunningham (accordion, keyboard, whistle, bodhran) and Johnny Cunningham (fiddle) to form the group Relativity. Together they released two critically successful albums: the eponymous Relativity (1985) and Gathering Pace (1987).

In 1987, Tríona and Irish-American flutist Brian Dunning joined Ó Domhnaill and Oskay to form the band Nightnoise. The quartet's first album Something of Time was released by Windham Hill Records in 1987. It was followed by At the End of the Evening (1988) and The Parting Tide (1990). These albums received significant commercial and critical acclaim, and helped the group develop an impressive reputation touring the United States, Japan, and Europe. Their music effectively combined "original acoustic chamber music with an Irish feel mixing jazz, classical, folk and new age idioms." Their original music made full use of the Ó Domhnaill's folk background, the folk/jazz combinations of Skara Brae, Brian Dunning's jazz background, and Bill Oskay's classical influences.

Nightnoise gave Mícheál the opportunity to expand his musical vocabulary as well as his audience, while retaining the spirit of Irish traditional music that was so much a part of him. In an interview with Echoes, Ó Domhnaill spoke of the prevailing influence of his Irish heritage in the new music he was creating:

We were pretty handcuffed and anchored by the tradition so we could still write music outside of the strictures of 6/8 time or 4/4 time, but they couldn't but sound Celtic because I'm Irish and whatever I write would have elements of the sum total of the listener experience I've had throughout my life. So the Celtic music is still there, the structure of the music is just different.

Following Billy Oskay's departure from Nightnoise in 1990, Scottish fiddler Johnny Cunningham, a former member of Silly Wizard who had played with Triona and Mícheál in the band Relativity, took over Oskay's duties. The band took on a much more Irish-centric sound, while still retaining their own signature style. The revamped Nightnoise went on to release the albums Shadow of Time (1994), A Different Shore (1995), and The White Horse Sessions (1997), an album featuring three live concert performances from Málaga, Spain in 1995, and in-studio live performances recorded in the White Horse Studies in Portland, with their Windham Hill colleagues as their audience.

The White Horse Sessions proved to be the last Nightnoise album. Cunningham left the band following its release, and was replaced by Irish fiddler John Fitzpatrick. The group recorded new material—both original compositions and covers of classic songs—but they were all made for albums other than their own. Nightnoise officially disbanded towards the end of 1997. In a 1999 interview, Ó Domhnaill stated that Nightnoise had not broken up, and that the band would be getting together again shortly, but a reunion never occurred.

== Later years ==
Mícheál Ó Domhnaill with Skara Brae at Gweedore, 2005

In 1997, Mícheál returned to Ireland, settling in Dundrum, Dublin. In the late 1990s, he and former members of Nightnoise performed on a weekly television show called Brid Live, broadcast by RTE1 in Dublin. In 2001, he teamed up with his close friend Paddy Glackin, the original Bothy Band fiddle player, and together they toured and recorded the album Athchuairt. Glackin later praised Ó Domhnaill for his role in popularising Irish language songs for a wider audience. "He took a lot of old songs," Glackin observed, "and re-fashioned them and made them accessible to a new generation."

On 7 July 2006, Mícheál Ó Domhnaill died of a heart attack at his home. He was 54 years old. On 11 July, a wake was held at the home of his sister Maighread and the following day a requiem Mass was said for Mícheál at the Church of the Holy Cross in Dundrum. The funeral was attended by numerous musicians from across Ireland, including the remaining members of The Bothy Band, piper Liam O'Flynn, accordion player Tony MacMahon, and Mairéad Ní Mhaonaigh. Mícheál Ó Domhnaill was buried in St. Colmcille's Cemetery in Kells, County Meath. Ireland's Minister for Arts, John O'Donoghue, in a press release said, "Mícheál Ó Domhnaill was one of Ireland's most gifted and well loved musicians. His contribution to the world of traditional and folk music was enormous. His passing is a great loss and he will be sadly missed."

On 24 May 2007, a remarkable gathering of Irish traditional musicians and singers came together at Vicar Street in Dublin to celebrate the life and music of Mícheál Ó Domhnaill. The performers included Paddy Keenan, Dónal Lunny, Kevin Burke, Mary Black, Maighread Ní Dhomhnaill,, and Tríona Ní Dhomhnaill.

== Equipment ==
During his early career, Ó Domhnaill played a dark journeyman's Guild dreadnought guitar on stage and on recordings. In 1977, he commissioned a custom-made guitar from luthier Kenny White who was based out of Portland, Oregon. During the 1990s, he played a 1975 Martin D-28, which he used on his later recordings and stage appearances. In a 1996 interview, Ó Domhnaill observed, "It's gotten louder, fuller, clearer, and more bell-like. It wasn't a great instrument when I bought it, but it was a Martin, and I knew it would improve if I played it. I have, and it's worked." Ó Domhnaill also owned a custom-made guitar by another Portland luthier Terry Demezas. He preferred medium-gauge phosphor-bronze strings, and used a large triangular Fender medium flatpick when not fingerpicking. For much of his career, he performed with a small quiver of tin whistles and a pedal harmonium.

== Discography ==
With Skara Brae

- Skara Brae (1971)

With Mick Hanly

- Celtic Folkweave (1974)

With The Bothy Band

- The Bothy Band (1975)
- Old Hag You Have Killed Me (1976)
- Out of the Wind – Into the Sun (1977)
- After Hours (Live in Paris) (1979)
- Best of The Bothy Band (1983)
- The Bothy Band Live in Concert (1995)

With Kevin Burke

- Promenade (1979)
- Portland (1982)

With Billy Oskay

- Nightnoise (1984)

With Relativity

- Relativity (1985)
- Gathering Pace (1987)

With Nightnoise

- Something of Time (1987)
- At the End of the Evening (1988)
- The Parting Tide (1990)
- A Windham Hill Retrospective (1992)
- Shadow of Time (1993)
- A Different Shore (1995)
- The White Horse Sessions (1997)
- Pure Nightnoise (2006)

With Paddy Glackin

- Reprise Athchuairt (2001)

With other artists

- Clannad 2 by Clannad (1974) (guitar, vocals)
- Tríona by Tríona Ní Dhomhnaill (1975) (guitar, leiriu)
- Noel Hill & Tony Linnane by Noel Hill (1978) (producer, church harmonium)
- If the Cap Fits by Kevin Burke (1978) (guitar)
- New Land by Touchstone (1982) (producer, guitar)
- Thunderhead by Malcolm Dalglish (1982) (producer, guitar)
- Jealousy by Touchstone (1984) (producer, guitar, keyboards)
- Heartland Messenger by Gerald Trimble (1984) (guitar, harmonium)
- Matt Molloy by Matt Molloy (1984) (producer)
- First Flight by Gerald Trimble (1984) (guitar)
- Above the Tower by Magical Strings (1985) (producer)
- Fair Play by Puck Fair (1987) (guitar, whistle, human whistle)
- On the Burren by Magical Strings (1987) (producer)
- Heathery Breeze by Matt Molloy (1988) (guitar)
- Road North by Alasdair Fraser (1989) (guitar)
- Crossing to Skellig by Magical Strings (1990) (producer)
- An Rás by Tommy Hayes (1991) (arranger, guitar)
- Open House by Kevin Burke (1992) (producer)
- Best of Ireland by Celtic Graces (1994) (guitar, vocals)
- Brotherhood of Stars by Carlos Nunez (1997) (guitar)
- Migration by Valgardena (1997) (performer)
- Sun the Moon and the Stars by Jimmy Smyth (1998) (composer)
- Idir an Dá Sholas by Maighread Ní Dhomnaill (2000) (guitar)
- Zoë Conway by Zoë Conway (2002) (guitar)
- Peace of Mind by Peace of Mind (2003) (guitar)
- Live in Belfast by Cathal Hayden (2005) (guitar, vocals)

Compilation albums

- Windham Hill Sampler '84 (1985)
- Windham Hill: Autumn Portrait (1985)
- A Winter's Solstice (1985)
- Flight of the Green Linnet (1988)
- Windham Hill Sampler '88 (1988)
- A Winter's Solstice II (1988)
- Playing with Fire: Celtic Fiddle Collection (1989)
- Sona Gaia: Collection One (1990)
- Windham Hill: The First Ten Years (1990)
- A Winter's Solstice III (1990)
- Windham Hill Sampler '92 (1991)
- Heart of the Gaels (1992)
- Impressionists: A Windham Hill Sampler (1992)
- A Winter's Solstice IV (1993)
- Bach Variations: A Windham Hill Sampler (1994)
- Windham Hill Sampler '94 (1994)
- A Winter's Solstice V (1995)
- Celtic Christmas: A Windham Hill Sampler (1995)
- Celtic Twilight, Vol. 2 (1996)
- Sanctuary: 20 Years of Windham Hill (1996)
- Windham Hill Sampler '96 (1996)
- Green Linnet 20th Anniversary Collection (1996)
- Carols of Christmas (1996)
- Celtic Christmas II (1996)
- On a Starry Night (1997)
- Holding up Half the Sky: Women's Voices from Around the World, Vol. 1 (1997)
- There Was a Lady: The Voice of Celtic Women (1997)
- Celtic Love Songs (1997)
- Celtic Music Today (1997)
- Traditional Music of Scotland (1997)
- Candlelight Moments: Serene Sounds (1997)
- Celtic Christmas III (1997)
- Her Infinite Variety: Celtic Women in Music & Song (1998)
- Putting on Airs (1998)
- Legends of Ireland (1998)
- Celtic Christmas IV (1998)
- Winter Solstice Reunion (1998)
- Joyful Noise: Celtic Favorites from Green Linnet (1998)
- Celtic Woman (1999) Valley
- Best of the Thistle & Shamrock, Vol. 1 (1999)
- Celtic Christmas V: The Millennium Edition (1999)
- Voice of Celtic Music (1999)
- Holding up Half the Sky: Voices of Celtic Women II (1999)
- National Geographic: Destination Ireland (2001)
- Celtic Christmas: Silver Anniversary Edition (2001)
- The Dance Music of Ireland: Jigs & Reels (2002)
- The Acoustic Folk Box (2002)
- Christmas Adagios: Holiday Classics to Touch Your Heart and Soul (2002)
- A Windham Hill Christmas (2002)
- Windham Hill Chill: Ambient Acoustic (2003)
- Windham Hill Chill 2 (2003)
- Very Best of Celtic Christmas (2004)
- Essential Winter's Solstice (2005)
- Quiet Revolution: 30 Years of Windham Hill (2005)
- Winter's Songs: A Windham Hill Christmas (2010)
