= The Bothy Band =

Irish traditional band

- Genre: Irish traditional music
- Years active: 1975–1979, 2007, 2023 - present
- Label: Gael Linn
- Members: Paddy Glackin; Matt Molloy; Tríona Ní Dhomhnaill; Kevin Burke; Seán Óg Graham
- Past members: Mícheál Ó Domhnaill (Died 2006); Tommy Peoples (Died 2018); Peter Browne; Paddy Keenan (Died 2026); Dónal Lunny (Died 2026)

The Bothy Band are an Irish traditional band, originally active during the mid 1970s. They quickly gained a reputation as one of the most influential bands playing Irish traditional music. Their enthusiasm and musical virtuosity had a significant influence on the Irish traditional music movement that continued well after they disbanded in 1979.

== History ==
=== Formation ===
The Bothy Band was formed in 1975 by bouzouki player Dónal Lunny, after he left the group Planxty to form his own record company, Mulligan. Lunny invited uilleann piper Paddy Keenan, flute and whistle player Matt Molloy, fiddler Paddy Glackin, and accordion player Tony MacMahon to get involved in an early project for the new label. This group of players was soon joined by a brother and sister who played in the Irish traditional group Skara Brae: Mícheál Ó Domhnaill on acoustic guitar and Tríona Ní Dhomhnaill on clavinet and vocals. Originally called Seachtar (Irish for "seven people"), the group was renamed by Mícheál Ó Domhnaill after Tony MacMahon left the group to work as a producer for BBC. The Bothy Band made its debut on 2 February 1975 at Trinity College, Dublin.

=== Three studio album career ===
In 1975 the Bothy Band released their eponymous first album on Mulligan Records (in Ireland; Green Linnet Records in the US; Polydor Records in the UK). Described on RTE as 'an incendiary mix of driving folk-rock rhythms' and 'a game-changer of an album', it established their reputation as a significant musical force in Irish traditional music. In 1976, they released their second album, Old Hag You Have Killed Me, which was praised as 'a benchmark of the genre' of Irish music and expanded their following. In 1977, they recorded what would be their last studio album, Out of the Wind – Into the Sun. In 1979, the Bothy Band released a live album, After Hours (Live in Paris).

During their four years together, the Bothy Band featured a variety of fiddlers. Original fiddler Glackin was replaced by Donegal fiddler Tommy Peoples on the band's début album. Peoples in turn was replaced by Sligo-influenced fiddler Kevin Burke on the second release. They played their final gig with this lineup at the 3rd Boys of Ballisodare Festival on 10 August 1979.

=== After the Bothy Band break-up ===
After the group disbanded in 1979, the members continued to play influential musical roles in the Irish traditional music movement. Lunny returned to Planxty along with Molloy, and then later helped form the Celtic rock band Moving Hearts. He continued working as a record producer and later joined Andy Irvine to form the group Mozaik, releasing two albums in 2004 and 2007. After recording two albums with Planxty, Molloy joined The Chieftains. After several solo projects with Ó Domhnaill, Burke founded Patrick Street with Irvine and Jackie Daly (formerly of De Dannan). Ó Domhnaill and Ní Dhomhnaill went on to form Relativity and Nightnoise.

In 1994, previously unreleased concert recordings from the 1970s were released as BBC Radio One – The Bothy Band Live in Concert. The music had been recorded in two different locations on different dates – 15 July 1976, at the BBC's Paris Theatre in London, and 24 July 1978, at the National Club, Kilburn. The first nine tracks, from the Paris Theatre concert, feature Peter Browne on pipes as a stand-in for Paddy Keenan.

=== 2007 tribute concert ===
Following the death of Mícheál Ó Domhnaill in July 2006, the surviving members of the Bothy Band came together at the tribute concert "Ómós- A Gig for Mícheál", held on 24 May 2007 at Vicar Street in Dublin. All proceeds from the concert went to the Irish Traditional Music Archive.

=== 2023 - 2024 Reunion ===
The group reunited again in 2023, initially for a television documentary, which led to a full Irish tour in 2024. the lineup included all surviving members, including both Paddy Glackin and Kevin Burke on fiddle, joined by guest musician Seán Óg Graham on guitar. The tour was ultimately cut short due to health issues experienced by Dónal Lunny, but the band were hopeful of re-scheduling concerts for 2025.

Uillean pipes player Paddy Keenan died on 9 September 2026. Bouzouki player Donal Lunny died on 23 October 2026.

== Discography ==
- The Bothy Band (1975) Track listing at irishtune.info
- Old Hag You Have Killed Me (1976) Track listing of 1982 reissue at Irishtune.info
- Out of the Wind – Into the Sun (1977) Track listing of 1985 reissue at Irishtune.info
- After Hours (Live in Paris) (1979) Track listing of 1984 reissue at Irishtune.info
- The Best of the Bothy Band (1980) Track listing of 1988 reissue at Irishtune.info
- The Bothy Band Live in Concert (1994) Track listing at Irishtune.info

== Band members ==
Current members

- Matt Molloy – flute, whistle (1975-1979; 2023–present)
- Paddy Glackin – fiddle (1975; 2023–present)
- Kevin Burke – fiddle (1976-1979; 2023–present)
- Tríona Ní Dhomhnaill – harpsichord, clavinet, harmonium, bodhrán, vocals (1975-1979; 2023–present)
- Seán Óg Graham – guitar (2023–present)

Former members

- Tommy Peoples – fiddle (1975-1976; died 2018)
- Mícheál Ó Domhnaill – vocals, guitar, keyboards (1975-1979; died 2006)
- Paddy Keenan – uilleann pipes, whistle (1975-1979; 2023–2026; died 2026)
- Dónal Lunny – bouzouki, vocals, guitar, bodhrán, synthesizer (1975-1979; 2023–2026; died 2026)

Touring members

- Peter Browne – uillean pipes, flute (1976)

=== Timeline ===
1975 to 1979

== See also ==
- Bothy band
