= Brian Dunning (flautist) =

Irish flautist and composer (1951–2022)

Brian Dunning (21 December 1951 – 10 February 2022) was an Irish flautist and composer, largely known for being a member of the Celtic band Nightnoise. He had both Celtic and jazz influences early on. He studied jazz and classical music, and was a student of James Galway. He taught music and religious studies for a short while at Ashlyns School in Berkhamsted, in the United Kingdom. He studied at the Berklee College of Music in 1977.

Dunning played the flute and panpipe in Puck Fair, a primarily instrumental "Irish jazz" group formed in New York in 1984 that played traditional Irish songs and original compositions. They released the album Fairplay on the Lost Lake Arts/Windham Hill label in 1987, with Dunning on flute and drummer Tommy Hayes on bodhran, joined by various musicians including Mícheál Ó Domhnaill. The group was later reformed in Dublin with Dunning, guitarist Sean Whelan, and percussionist Robbie Harris, releasing the album Forgotten Carnival on their own label in 2008. He collaborated with keyboardist Jeff Johnson since the late 1980s, recording several albums together, including Songs from Albion (1992), The Music of Celtic Legends – the Bard and the Warrior (1997), Byzantium (2000), and Patrick (2004).

Dunning was a member in the extraordinary band Nightnoise since 1987.

Dunning performed on the soundtrack to Gangs of New York, Windhorse, and The Outcasts.

Dunning died on 10 February 2022, at the age of 70.

== Selected discography ==
=== With Jeff Johnson and Wendy Goodwin ===
- Under the Wonder Sky (2010)
- Winterfold (2013)
- If I Do Not Remember... (2016)
- Kohelet (2020)
- Coming, Going (2022)

== See also ==
- Jeff Johnson
