= Tríona Ní Dhomhnaill =

Irish singer (born 1953)

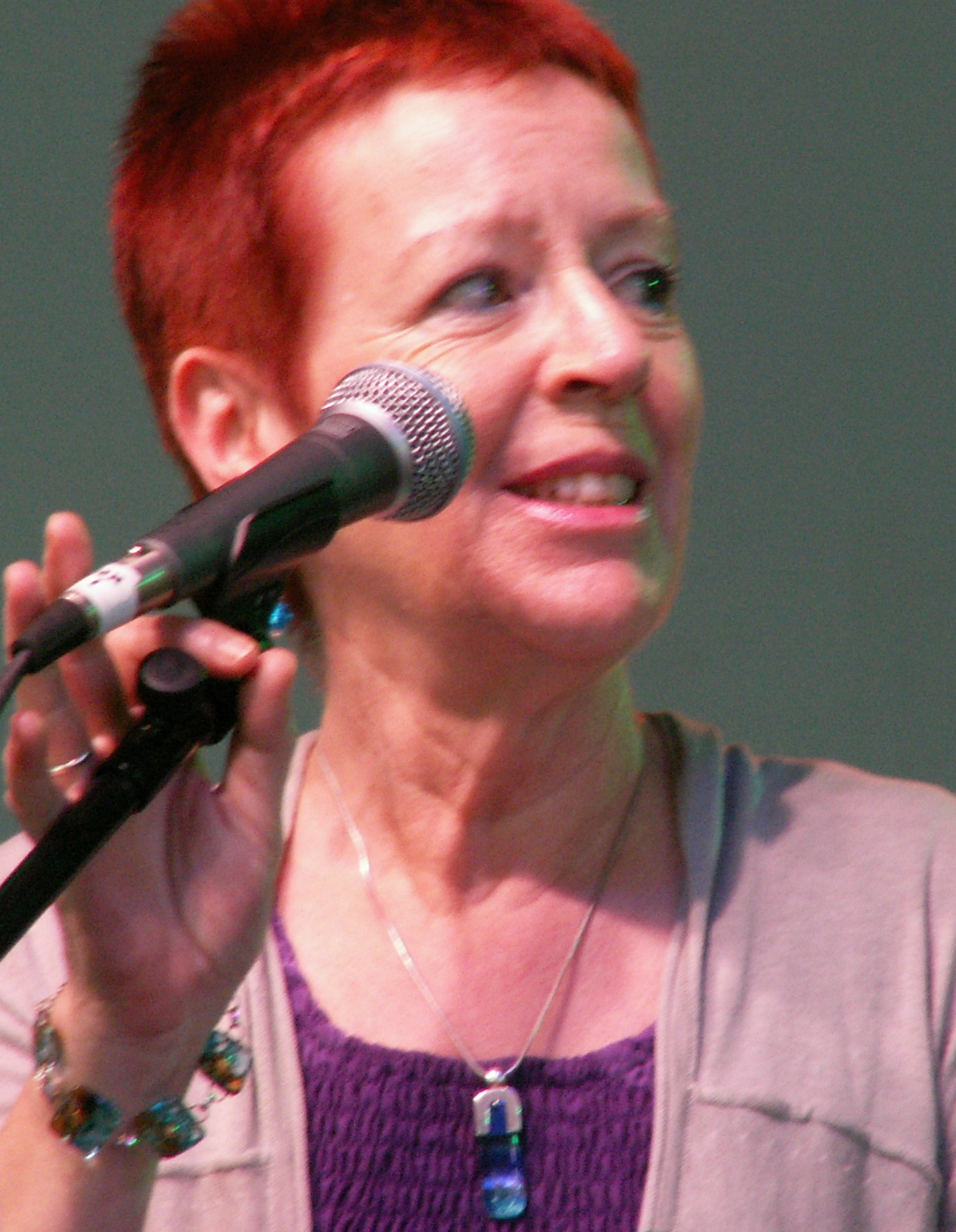
- Ní Dhomhnaill in 2005

Background information
- Born: Tríona Ní Dhomhnaill; 1953 (age 72–73); Kells, County Meath, Ireland
- Genres: Irish traditional, celtic, folk
- Occupations: Singer, pianist, composer
- Years active: 1970–present
- Labels: Green Linnet; Gael-Linn Records; Windham Hill; Mulligan Records
- Website: trionanidhomhnaill.com

Tríona Ní Dhomhnaill (born 1953) is an acclaimed Irish traditional singer, keyboard player, and composer. She is considered one of the most influential female vocalists in the history of Irish music. Throughout her career, Tríona Ní Dhomhnaill has worked with renowned traditional Irish groups such as Skara Brae, The Bothy Band, and Nightnoise. In February 2024 it was announced that she was to be recognised with a Lifetime Achievement Award at the 6th RTÉ Radio 1 Folk Awards.

== Early years ==
Tríona Ní Dhomhnaill was raised in Kells, County Meath. She was born in 1953. Her paternal grandparents moved there from the Rann na Feirste Gaeltacht of County Donegal in the 1930s.

Tríona is from a prominent musical family. Her paternal aunt, Neillí, contributed nearly 300 folk songs to the folklore collection of University College Dublin. Together with her brother, Mícheál Ó Domhnaill, younger sister Maighread Ní Dhomhnaill, and multi-instrumentalist Dáithí Sproule, Ní Dhomhnaill formed the folk group, Skara Brae, in which she played the clavinet and sang. Skara Brae specialised in songs sung in the Irish language, many sourced from the Rann na Feirste area where their father's family originated.

== The Bothy Band ==
When Dónal Lunny left the band Planxty in 1975, he formed a new group to accompany accordion player Tony MacMahon on a series of shows for Irish National Radio. Along with uilleann pipe player Paddy Keenan, flute and whistle player Matt Molloy, and fiddle player Paddy Glackin, Ní Dhomhnaill and her brother became charter members. Initially named Seachtar (Irish for "seven people"), the group changed its name to the Bothy Band after the departure of MacMahon. In this group, too, Ní Dhomhnaill played clavinet and vocals.

As the Bothy Band, the group played its first concert on 2 February 1975, at Trinity College Dublin. Although they were together for only three years, the Bothy Band were one of the first bands to bring the musical traditions of Ireland up to contemporary standards. While the group experienced numerous personnel changes, Ní Dhomhnaill and her brother Micheal were still members when the Bothy Band's final album, Afterhours, was recorded during a concert performance at the Palais des Arts in Paris in 1978. A second live album, Live in Concert, recorded by the BBC in London at the Paris Theatre in July 1976 and Kilburn National Theatre in July 1978, was released in 1995.

She continues to perform with the band following its reunion in 2023.

== Career in the United States ==
By the time the Bothy Band disbanded in 1979, Ní Dhomhnaill had been persuaded by singer/songwriter Mike Cross to emigrate to Chapel Hill, North Carolina in the United States. Ní Dhomhnaill soon assembled a new band of North American musicians, Touchstone, that initially rehearsed in Cross's home. The band consisted of Ní Dhomhnaill and Zan McLeod, who had worked with singer and songwriter Mike Cross. Touchstone's two albums, The New Land (1982) and Jealousy (1984), combined songs sung in Irish, original singer/songwriter tunes, and traditional folk songs from the United States and Nova Scotia. The band's music was described as traditional Irish music with some bluegrass music influence. They disbanded in the mid 1980s.

Relocating to Portland, Oregon, in the mid-1980s, Ní Dhomhnaill was reunited with her brother Mícheál, who had emigrated to the area from Ireland a few years before. Together with the Cunningham brothers, Johnny and Phil, formerly with the Scottish group Silly Wizard, they toured and recorded two albums as Relativity. They also collaborated with Billy Oskay and Brian Dunning, (Billy Oskay was later replaced by Johnny Cunningham), in a Celtic-tinged new age group, Nightnoise.

== Discography ==
Solo albums

- Tríona (1975)
- The Key's Within (2010)

With Skara Brae

- Skara Brae (1971)

With Clannad

- Clannad 2 (1975)

With The Bothy Band

- The Bothy Band (1975)
- Old Hag You Have Killed Me (1976)
- Out of the Wind (1977)
- After Hours (Live in Paris) (1979)
- Best of the Bothy Band (1983)
- The Bothy Band – Live in Concert (1995)

With Touchstone

- The New Land (1982)
- Jealousy (1984)

With Relativity

- Relativity (1985)
- Gathering Pace (1987)

With Nightnoise

- Something of Time (1987)
- At the End of the Evening (1988)
- The Parting Tide (1990)
- A Windham Hill Retrospective (1992, compilation)
- Shadow of Time (1993)
- A Different Shore (1995)
- The White Horse Sessions (1997)
- Pure Nightnoise (2006, compilation)

With Maighread Ní Dhomhnaill

- Idir an Dá Sholas (with Maighread Ní Dhomhnaill and Dónal Lunny) (1999)

With other artists

- The Gathering (1981)
- Hard Times (with the Red Clay Ramblers) (1981)
- Imeall (with Mairéad Ní Mhaonaigh) (2008)
- Ceol Cheann Dubhrann (2009)
- T with the Maggies (2010)

Compilations

- Celtic Christmas: A Windham Hill Sampler (1995)
- Celtic Christmas Volume II: A Windham Hill Sampler (1996)
- The Rough Guide to Irish Music (1996)
- Celtic Christmas Volume III: A Windham Hill Sampler (1997)
- Celtic Christmas Volume IV: A Windham Hill Sampler (1998)
- "A Celtic Season: A Windham Hill Collection" (1995)
