= Pobalscoil Ghaoth Dobhair =

- Gweedore Community School
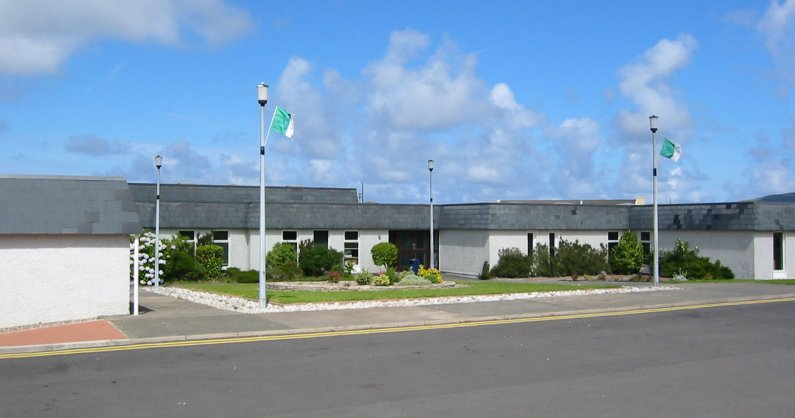
- Front entrance to Pobalscoil Ghaoth Dobhair
- Gweedore, County Donegal; Ireland

Information
- Religious affiliation: Roman Catholic
- Established: 1973
- Principal: Seoirse Ó Dochartaigh
- Staff: 50+
- Enrollment: approx 450
- Website: www.psgd.ie

Pobalscoil Ghaoth Dobhair (Gweedore Community School) is an Irish-medium secondary school in the Gaeltacht district of Gaoth Dobhair, County Donegal, Ireland. It has a pupil attendance of around 450.

== History ==
Pobalscoil Ghaoth Dobhair was established in 1973 following an amalgamation of Ard Scoil Mhuire (a secondary school in Magheraclogher established in 1957) and the Strathna Corcra Vocational School (1966). The school ran between the two buildings until 1980 when the new school was opened in Lunnigh on the 3 May 1982.

A number of extensions have been made since then, such as a football pitch in 2001, a sports hall in 2012 and a New Education Unit in 2022.

== Alumni ==
- Aoife Ní Fhearraigh, singer
- Brídín Brennan, singer
- Gavin O Fearraigh, actor
- Maria McCool, singer
- Natasha Nic Gairbheith, former Miss Ireland
- Odhrán Mac Niallais, Gaelic footballer
- Pearse Doherty, Sinn Féin TD
- Rónán Mac Aodha Bhuí, radio presenter
