= Seán Mac Fhionnghaile =

Irish actor (c.1952–2009)

- Born: Seán McGinley c. 1952; Gweedore, County Donegal
- Died: 1 November 2009
- Occupation: Actor
- Spouse: Theresa McGinley (19??–2009; his death)
- Children: 4

Seán McGinley (c. 1952 – 1 November 2009), known as Seán Mac Fhionnghaile, was an Irish actor from County Donegal. He was known primarily for his comic roles, particularly for his leading roles in the TG4 sitcoms C.U. Burn and Gleann Ceo, as well as RTÉ Raidió na Gaeltachta comedy series Cois Cuan. He was executive producer for the 12-part series, FFC, and was a member of Aisteoiri Ghaoth Dobhair, an actors' group.

== Early life ==
He was born Seán McGinley in Gweedore, County Donegal. His mother, Grainne, would survive him.

== Career ==
Best known for his leading roles in television shows such as CU Burn and Gleann Ceo, he was executive producer for a further 12-part series, FFC, for TG4. He was involved in the RTÉ Raidió na Gaeltachta comedy programme Cois Cuan. He also established Cul a Tigh, a television production company. He transformed a run-down factory near his home into a training school and production centre.

== Personal life ==
He and his wife Theresa had two daughters and two sons together. He died on 1 November 2009 at the age of 57 following a two year battle with cancer. His funeral took place at Saint Columba's Church in Brinalack, Gaoth Dobhair two days later.
