= If I Told You =

If I Told You may refer to:

- If I Told You (album), a 2006 album by Aoife Ní Fhearraigh, or the title song
- If I Told You (song), a 2016 song by Darius Rucker

== See also ==
- If I Told You, You Were Beautiful, an album by Minor Majority
