= Amharclann Ghaoth Dobhair =

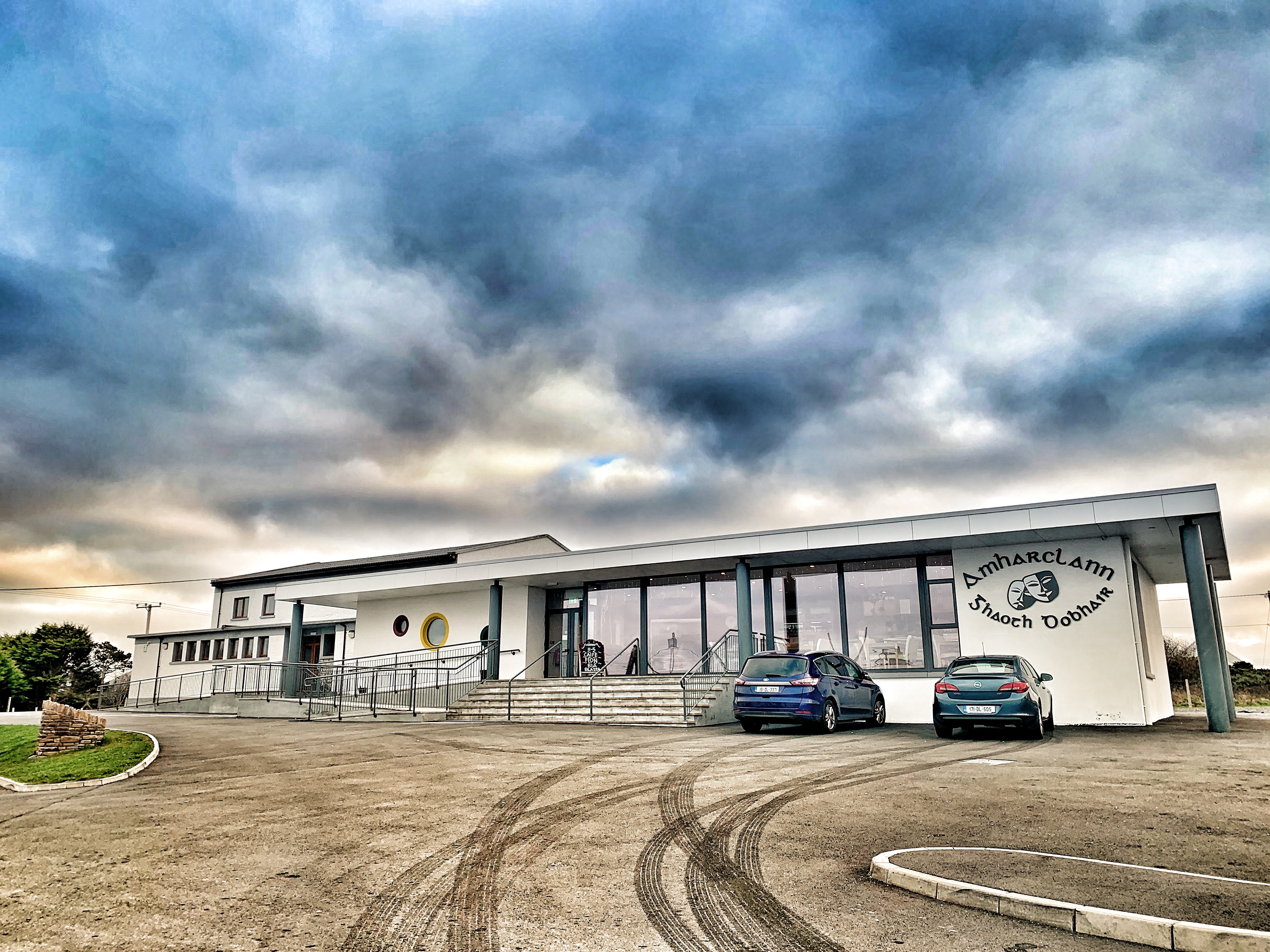
- Interactive map of the Amharclann Ghaoth Dobhair area

General information
- Type: Theatre
- Architectural style: Modern
- Location: Gweedore, County Donegal, Ireland
- Coordinates: 55°04′15″N 8°17′44″W
- Completed: 1962
- Opened: 1962

Amharclann Ghaoth Dobhair (pronounced [ˈəuɾˠklˠən̪ˠ ˌɣiː ˈd̪ˠoːɾʲ]), anglicized as Gweedore Theatre, is a local theatre in the Gaeltacht region of Derrybeg in the parish of Gweedore, County Donegal, Ireland. It seats over 200 patrons, and ever since it was opened by actress Siobhán McKenna, it has staged hundreds of plays in the Irish language.

Aisteoirí Ghaoth Dobhair was a group of actors founded in Srath na Corcra, Derrybeg in 1932, and they gained critical acclaim and travelled as far as Glasgow to perform. The key people involved in the group were Eoghan Mac Giolla Bhríghde, Áine Nic Giolla Bhríghde, Johnnie Sheáin Ó Gallchóir, Proinsias Ó Maonaigh, Máire Bn. Uí Bhraonáin, Tomás Mac Giolla Bhríghde, Seán Ó Casaide, Néilí Ó Maolagáin, Niall Ó Dufaigh, and Proinsias Ó Duibhir.

== Aisteoirí Ghaoth Dobhair's Pantomimes ==
Several well-known local names took to the limelight in productions of Geamaireachtaí Aisteoirí Ghaoth Dobhair. These include the following female vocalists and musicians: Eithne Ní Bhraonáin from Dore, now known globally as Enya; Mairéad Ní Mhaonaigh of Altan, and Máire Ní Bhraonáin, better known as Moya Brennan.

Three of the Uí Chasaide clan Na Casaidigh also performed, as well as two brothers of Enya and Moya, Pól and Ciarán Brennan, of internationally renowned group Clannad.

These individuals all took part in the pantos before taking to the world-stage. The pantomimes have included the below productions:

- 1962 - Turloch Óg na dTuath
- 1963 - Ball Dearg
- 1964 - An tSleagh Ghlas
- 1965 - Fionnán in Arabia
- 1967 - An Gobán Saor
- 1968 - An Glas Gaibhlinn
- 1970 - Mac Rí Uladh
- 1973 - Iníon Rí Ailigh
