= Maria McCool =

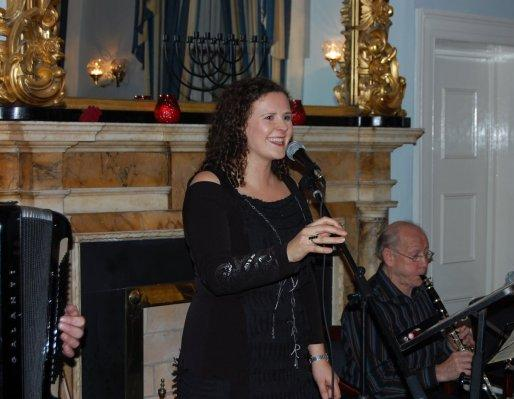
- Maria McCool performing at the launch of her album Doagh on 4 December 2009

Background information
- Birth name: Maria Nic Cumhaill
- Born: 23 May 1974 (age 51); Gaoth Dobhair, County Donegal, Ireland
- Genres: Celtic, Traditional Irish
- Occupation(s): Singer, schoolteacher
- Instrument: Fiddle
- Years active: 1995–present

Maria McCool (born 23 May 1974) (Irish: Maria Nic Cumhaill) is an Irish singer from Gweedore, County Donegal. She is well known for performing old Irish songs in her native Irish and in English. Her albums include Ailleog and Doagh, on which she covered such songs as "Ar Éirinn Ní Neosfainn Cé Hí" and "Song For Ireland". She has received numerous awards at Celtic festivals in Ireland and the UK. In 2007, McCool was married and worked as a national school teacher in Dunshaughlin in County Meath.

McCool grew up as a member of the choir at St. Mary's church in Gweedore, singing alongside Enya, Aoife Ní Fhearraigh, Moya Brennan and other members of Clannad who are also members. Her music teacher at Pobalscoil Ghaoth Dobhair was Baba Brennan, the mother of Clannad and Enya.

McCool took part in the Eurosong competition on The Late Late Show on 24 February 2012, where she performed "Mistaken", written by Edele Lynch. She finished in fifth place.

== Discography ==
- Oíche Chiúin (1995)
- Ailleog (1997)
- Doagh (2009)
- Shenandoah (2018)
