= Loinneog Cheoil =

Studio album by Aoife Ní Fhearraigh
- Released: 1991
- Genre: Traditional Irish music
- Label: Gael-Linn Records

Aoife Ní Fhearraigh chronology
Loinneog Cheoil (1991)	Aoife (1996)

Loinneog Cheoil is the début album by Irish singer Aoife Ní Fhearraigh. The albums features mainly traditional material in Irish from the Gweedore and Rosses areas of County Donegal.

== Track listing ==
Side 1 / Taobh 1

1. Neansaí Mhíle Grá
2. Ar A Ghabhail 'n A Chuain Domh
3. Úrchnoc Chéin Mhic Cáinte
4. Fuígfidh Mise An Baile Seo
5. An Chéad Mháirt Den Fhómhar

Side 2 / Taobh 2

1. Seachran Charn
2. Cianach Corrach
3. Cuaichín Ghleann Néifín
4. Dónall Óg
5. Fill, Fill a Rún Ó

== 2005 CD release ==
The album was re-released on CD in 2005, produced by Manus Lunny, and had 12 tracks:

1. Ar a Ghabháil 'n Chuain Domh (As I Went to the Harbour)
2. Neansaí Mhile Grá (Nancy, My Precious Love)
3. Fuígfidh Mise an Baile Seo (I Shall Leave This Place Now)
4. Fil, Fill, A Rún Ó (Return, Return, My Darling)
5. Cianach Corrach (Lonesome and Troubled)
6. Dónall Óg (Young Dónall)
7. Seachrán Charn Tsiail (Carn Tsiail Delusion)
8. Mhaighdean Mhara (The Mermaid)
9. Cuaichín Ghleann Neifín (The Little Cuckoo of Gleann Neifin)
10. Úrchnoc Chéin Mhic Cáinte
11. Chéad Mháirt de Fhómhar (The First Tuesday of Autumn)
12. Cad é Sin Don Té Sin (It's Not Their Concern)

== Personnel ==
- Aoife Ní Fhearraigh - lead vocals
- Seán Mac Ruairí - keyboard guitar
- Paula Ní Dhubhcháin - Fiddle
- Shane Mitchell - Accordion
- Liam Kelly - Irish Flute
- Michael Holmes - Bouzouki
