= Inis Oirthir =

Inis Oirthir (Irish for 'outer island') may refer to two islands in Ireland:

- Inisheer, one of the Aran Islands of Galway Bay
- Inishsirrer, off the Donegal coast
