= Trasna na dTonnta =

Traditional Irish song

Song
- Language: Irish
- Written: 18th century?
- Released: Unknown
- Genre: Folk, children's music, Irish traditional music
- Songwriter: Traditional
- Lyricist: Unspecified

"Trasna na dTonnta" (Irish pronunciation: [ˈt̪ˠɾˠasˠn̪ˠə n̪ˠə ˈd̪ˠɔn̪ˠt̪ˠə]; "Across the Waves") is a traditional Irish song, it is often taught to primary school children. It also has the same tune as the 20th century Scottish folk song "Westering Home".

The upbeat song is a narration of a rower who is returning to Ireland following his travels abroad. The song originates from the Gaoth Dobhair area of County Donegal.

== Lyrics ==
Trasna na dtonnta, dul siar, dul siar,
Slán leis an uaigneas ‘is slán leis an gcian;
Geal é mo chroí, agus geal í an ghrian,
Geal bheith ag filleadh go hÉirinn!

Chonaic mo dhóthain de Thíortha i gcéin,
Ór agus airgead, saibhreas an tsaoil,
Éiríonn an croí ‘nam le breacadh gach lae
‘S mé druidim le dúthaigh mo mhuintir!

Ar mo thriall siar ó éirigh mo chroí
An aimsir go hálainn is tonnta deas réidh
Stiúradh go díreach go dúthaigh mo chliabh
‘S bheidh mé in Éirinn amárach!

Muintir an Iarthair ‘siad cairde mo chroí,
Fáilte ‘is féile bheidh romham ar gach taobh.
Ar fhágaint an tsaoil seo, sé ghuidhim ar an Rí
Gur leosan a shinfear i gcill mé.

Over the waves, returning, returning!
Good-bye to loneliness and to the distant remoteness;
Bright is my heart and bright is the sun,
Happy to be returning to Ireland!

I saw my fill of countries abroad,
Gold and silver, the wealth of the world,
My heart rises in me with the break of each day,
As I draw closer to the land of my people!

On my journey - oh! my heart rises!
The weather is beautiful and the waves are settled
Steering directly to land of my bosom
And I'll be in Ireland tomorrow!

People of the West, they're the friends of my heart,
Welcome and celebration awaits me on every side.
Leaving this life I pray to the Lord
That it's with them I'll be stretched in the graveyard!
