= Inishmeane =

Island off Donegal coast, Ireland

Native name: Inis Meáin
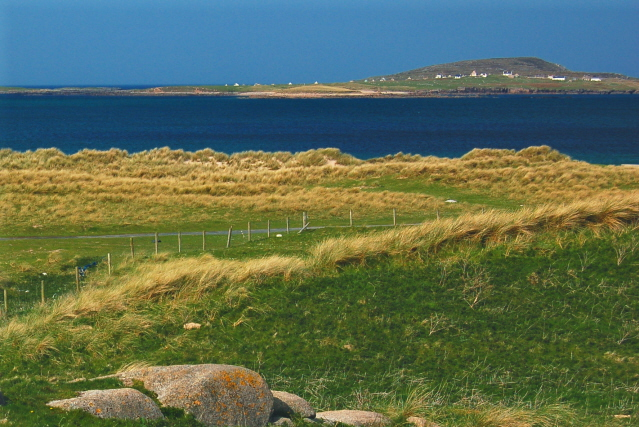
- Inishmeane from Magheragallon Cemetery

- Location within island of Ireland

Geography
- Location: Atlantic Ocean
- Coordinates: 55°06′15″N 8°20′46″W
- Area: 0.473 km^{2} (0.183 sq mi)

Administration
- Ireland
- Province: Ulster
- County: Donegal

Demographics
- Population: 7 (2011)

Inishmeane (Irish: Inis Meáin, meaning 'middle island') is a small island and a townland off the coast of Gweedore, County Donegal, Ireland and was once home to a vibrant fishing community. The island has been unpopulated for decades but in recent years some people have started to return.

== Geography ==
Inishmeane is around 1 kilometre off the coast of Gweedore. It lies between Gola Island (South-East) and Inishsirrer (North).

== History ==
The island was inhabited up until the 1960s; today most of the buildings are derelict, but about eight have been renovated for use as holiday homes or permanent habitation.

On Inishmeane there is no electricity nor freshwater public supply.

A concrete pier was installed during the celtic tiger years to allow residents to moor their boats.

== Demographics ==
The table below reports data on Inishmeane's population taken from Discover the Islands of Ireland (Alex Ritsema, Collins Press, 1999) and the Census of Ireland.

Historical population

Year	Pop.	±%
1841	12	—
1851	57	+375.0%
1861	46	−19.3%
1871	34	−26.1%
1881	42	+23.5%
1891	68	+61.9%
1901	68	+0.0%
1911	82	+20.6%

Year	Pop.	±%
1926	63	−23.2%
1936	66	+4.8%
1946	62	−6.1%
1951	58	−6.5%
1956	54	−6.9%
1961	47	−13.0%
1966	2	−95.7%
1971	0	−100.0%

Year	Pop.	±%
1979	0	0.00%
1981	0	0.00%
1986	0	0.00%
1991	0	0.00%
1996	0	0.00%
2002	0	0.00%
2006	0	0.00%
2011	7	—

Source: Central Statistics Office. "CNA17: Population by Off Shore Island, Sex and Year". CSO.ie.

== Gallery ==
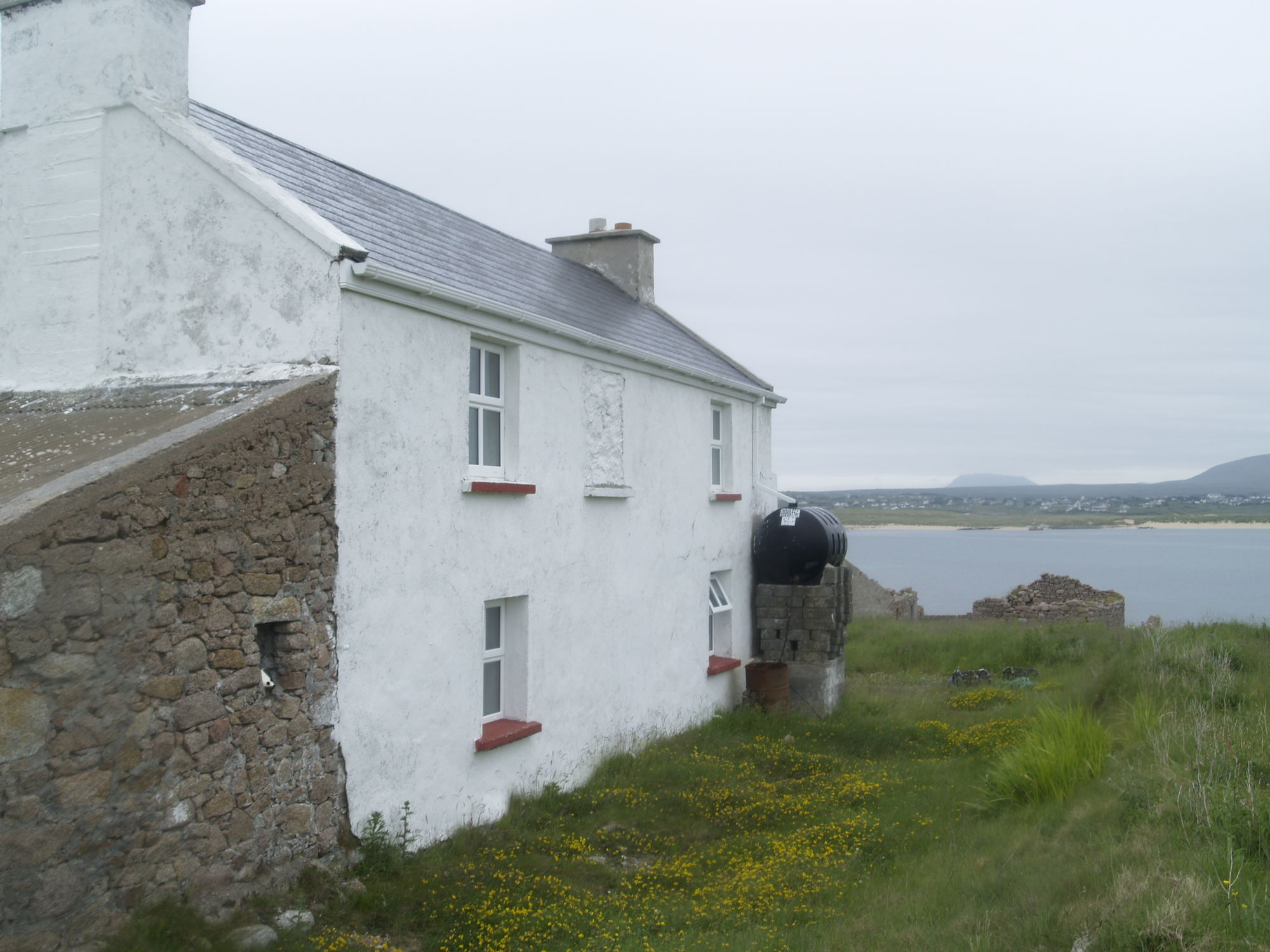
House on Inishmeane

== See also ==
- List of islands of Ireland
- Inis Meáin (Aran Islands)
