= Báidín Fheilimí =

Traditional Irish song

Báidín Fheilimí on tin whistle

Báidín Fheilimí is a traditional Irish song, which originates in the Gaeltacht region in the north-west of County Donegal. It is often taught to young children. The song, in Irish is about a small boat owned by a man called Feilimí (Phelim). While not specified in the song, it refers to Feilimí Cam Ó Baoill, who was chieftain of the Rosses in the 17th century and his escape to nearby Islands from his archenemy.

It has been covered by artists such as Na Casaidigh, Sinéad O'Connor, Angelo Branduardi, Emmet Spiceland, and John Spillane.

There are some alternative versions of the last verse, either mentioning the boatload of fish or omitting it. The latter is common in more recent versions, wherein the easier verse Báidín Fheilimí is Feilimí ann is used.

The lyrics refer to the islands of Gola and Tory off the coast of Gweedore.

== Lyrics ==
The lyrics, which are in the public domain, are as follows:

Báidín Fheilimí d’imigh go Gabhla,
Báidín Fheilimí is Feilimí ann.
Báidín Fheilimí d’imigh go Gabhla,
Báidín Fheilimí is Feilimí ann.

Curfá
Báidín bídeach, báidín beosach,
Báidín bóidheach, báidín Fheilimí.
Báidín díreach, báidín deontach,
Báidín Fheilimí is Feilimí ann.

Báidín Fheilimí d’imigh go Toraí,
Báidín Fheilimí is Feilimí ann.
Báidín Fheilimí d’imigh go Toraí,
Báidín Fheilimí is Feilimí ann.

Báidín Fheilimí briseadh i dToraí,
Báidin Fheilimí is Feilimí ann.
Báidín Fheilimí briseadh i dToraí,
Báidin Fheilimí is Feilimí ann.

Báidín Fheilimí briseadh i dToraí,
Iasc ar bhord agus Feilimí ann.
Báidín Fheilimí briseadh i dToraí,
Iasc ar bhord agus Feilimí ann.

English translation

Felimi's little boat went to Gola,
Felimi's little boat and Felimi in it.
Felimi's little boat went to Gola,
Felimi's little boat and Felimi in it.

Chorus
A tiny boat, a lively boat,
A charming boat, Felimi's little boat.
A straight boat, a willing boat,
Felimi's little boat and Felimi in it.

Felimi's little boat went to Tory,
Felimi's little boat and Felimi in it.
Felimi's little boat went to Tory
Felimi's little boat and Felimi in it.

Felimi's little boat broke on Tory,
Felimi's little boat and Felimi in it.
Felimi's little boat broke on Tory,
Felimi's little boat and Felimi in it.

Felimi's little boat broke on Tory,
Fish on board and Felimi in it.
Felimi's little boat broke on Tory,
Fish on board and Felimi in it.
