= C.U. Burn =

- Also known as: CU Burn, C. U. Burn
- Genre: Sitcom
- Starring: Seán Mac Fhionnghaile
- Country of origin: Ireland
- Original language: Irish
- No. of seasons: 3
- No. of episodes: 16

Production
- Running time: 25–28 minutes

Original release
- Network: Teilifís na Gaeilge
- Release: 31 October 1996

C.U. Burn is a cult Irish language television comedy broadcast on the Irish-language television channel Teilifís na Gaeilge (now called TG4). It tells the tales of the County Donegal undertakers Charlie and Vincie Burn who run a turf-fueled crematorium. They are rivalled by another group of more professional undertakers led by Frank Doyle. The show revolves around the cunning Charlie Burn (the C.U. Burn of the title) whose ruthless pursuit of business often leads to much chaos while his long-suffering brother Vincie Burn simply requests a quiet life. Pádraig assists at the crematorium and Pádraig's sister Máiréad is the recurring love interest of Charlie.

C.U. Burn deals with a number of social issues common in Irish life such as drug dealing, dishonesty, ghosts, adultery, racism, drunken one-night stands, brain conditions, nicotine addiction, shipwreck, sexual repression, tax avoidance, thievery and the rare occurrence of accidental cremation. Irish pursuits such as fishing, golf and gaelic games feature prominently. It was written and directed by Niall Mac Eachmharcaigh and was first broadcast in 1996. The series was filmed entirely in the fictional locality of Gleann Dómhain in the Donegal Gaeltacht area of Gaoth Dobhair, and was one of the first home-produced TV series to be broadcast on the fledgling TG4. Subtitles are available.

== Cast ==
The following are the main and recurring cast and characters who appear in more than one episode.

Character	Actor
Charlie Burn	Aodh Óg Ó Duibheannaigh
Vincie Burn	Seán Mac Fhionnghaile
Pádraig	Seán Ó Maolagáin
Mairéad	Mairéad Dinny Ní Ghallchóir
Frank Doyle	Pól Mac Cumhail
Spot	Herself
Priest	Seán Ó Gallchóir

== Main characters ==
Charles "Charlie" Burn is co-owner of C.U. Burn Crematorium Ltd. and the younger brother of Vincie.

Vincent "Vincie" Burn is co-owner of C.U. Burn Crematorium Ltd. and the elder brother of Charlie.

Pádraig is Máiréad's brother and assists at the crematorium. He constructs coffins, burns bodies and becomes involved in many of Charlie's schemes. He takes on the role of a corpse on one occasion when Vincie accidentally burns the wrong body and has to lie overnight in a coffin sporting a fake beard and with only sandwiches provided by Charlie. When Charlie and Vincie become stranded overnight on Tory Island, he is left alone at their house adjacent to the crematorium. He proceeds to read ghost stories and becomes frightened after hearing the wail of a banshee which turns out to have been emitted by Spot the cat. From that moment he becomes scared of ghosts and later in a separate incident, thinking he has seen the ghost of John Dubh, runs away in panic.

Máiréad is Pádraig's sister and the love interest of Charlie Burn. He makes regular visits to her house on the premise that these visits are related to Pádraig's involvement in his business. On one occasion she makes tea for him and tells him she is lonely. They later sneak out to spend some time together in the crematorium under the cover of darkness. However they go no further than kissing and Máiréad insists that will be all until she is married.

Frank Doyle is a rival funeral director who conducts his business through the medium of the English language. This is a direct opposite to Charlie and Vincie who use the Irish language. Doyle is however heard to speak the Irish language with his associates throughout the show and seemingly uses the English language to attract extra business, i.e. in newspaper advertisements. Charlie is unhappy with this betrayal of his heritage as can be seen when he submits a false English language advertisement to the local newspaper in which it is claimed that Doyle will deal with foreign deaths. He then rings Doyle claiming to be from Belfast and requests his services. Doyle rings back upon his arrival in Belfast and Vincie replies to the vexed undertaker who expresses his dissatisfaction at having been conned.

Spot is the crematorium cat who has a habit of getting in the way and disrupting the schemes of his masters. He is sometimes found inside the coffins. On one occasion he is discovered by the taxman in his car, having eaten the goldfish he purchased for his daughter's birthday.

The Priest is not given a name and is merely credited as such. He conducts funerals, expressing his ire on one occasion when the grave is only six inches and not the required six feet deep. He also publicly praises Charlie during a Mass when he donates a large sum of money he has located to the church roof fund. However Charlie has secretly only donated half the sum and kept the other half for himself.

== Minor characters ==
A number of characters had minor background roles which involved appearances in one episode.

- Antaine, a garda involved in the search for a drugs haul in "Toit". He is more reserved than his red-haired colleague (played by Bernard McHugh) who seizes a reporter for The Times and interrogates him in his underpants.
- Bríd (played by Fiona Mac Giolla Brighide), married to Peadar whom she met at the Mary from Dungloe festival. She is a golf fanatic who uses her time on the course to commit adultery with her secret lover Mark. They discuss her various attempts to remove Peadar from her life by making his as difficult as possible. Her efforts to poison him with arsenic serve only to increase his blackouts. After she discovers Peadar went to the Mary from Dungloe against her wishes she hatches a plan to kill him by striking him with a golf club upon his re-entry, after which she hopes to offer the excuse that she thought he was a burglar. A faulty and unfixed electric socket leads to her fatal electrocution as Charlie hands Peadar his business card.
- Daniel O'Donnell, a popular country and western singer who greets his fans upon their arrival at Donegal Airport in "Toit". One of the drug dealers skips the queue of mainly elderly ladies and asks him to sign his guitar case.
- Donncha Eoghain, brother of the corpse Tomás Eoghain in "Thar Sáile". A fisherman, he waits on Oileán Ealla for Charlie and Vincie to deposit their load ashore when he hopes to be brought to the mainland himself to witness the funeral. When the brothers are washed up on Tory Island he rings their house to enquire as to their whereabouts, terrifying Pádraig in the process. Later, through his binoculars, he witnesses Charlie, Vincie and Genevieve rowing by in his brother's coffin with his brother trailing behind (on the lid) after their boat springs a leak.
- Eamonn, a taxi-driver hired by Micí Dubh. He chauffeurs him on a journey that takes in the crematorium, his family home, the graveyard and the crematorium again. He can be seen standing by his car reading a newspaper as Micí Dubh kneels at his brother's grave.
- Genevieve, also referred to as "Gin" and "Jenny" at various points by Charlie and Vincie in "Thar Sáile". She sells insurance (in reality, life assurance) and encounters the brothers on Tory Island after they wash ashore at her hotel. Her attempts to seduce Vincie are undone when Charlie knocks on her room window, claiming that he cannot find a room for himself and their drunken father (a corpse they possess). Genevieve is desperate to reach Sligo by 14:00 the following day to attend a meeting but, despite receiving assurance from the ferry captain that he leaves at 10:00, he sets sail early, leaving her no option but to row there on Charlie and Vincie's boat. A frustrated stamp of her stiletto causes the boat to spring a leak.
- Máire, sister of the corpse Seán Ó Baoill, accidentally cremated in "Dubh agus Bán". She makes the situation difficult by arriving from New York City (and corrects Charlie by saying she is actually from Boston) just as the coffin containing a falsely bearded and hungry Pádraig has been sealed (with him hiding behind a wardrobe). Unable to find a false beard the three cut one from the back of her coat, which becomes very clear as she turns her back to leave the room.
- Mark, Bríd's adulterous lover on Crutch Island Golf Course. He suffers spinal pains but welcomes Bríd's massages, later encouraging her in her plan to kill Peadar with her golf club.
- Micí Dubh, returns from America after fifty years upon the death of his twin brother, John. He causes confusion amongst Pádraig, Vincie and then Charlie when they think he is his brother's ghost come to warn Charlie not to steal $4000 found in one of his pockets.
- Peadar (played by Frank McCafferty), the long-suffering husband of Bríd whom he met at the Mary from Dungloe festival. He suffers regular blackouts and burns his wife's clothes whilst attempting to iron them. Against Bríd's wishes he leaves their house for the Mary from Dungloe as she has left him alone to play golf. However, in his confusion over the suddenly sunny weather, he forgets to bring his coat in whose pocket are his tablets. After some alcoholic beverages in a pub and feeling suddenly unwell, he collapses clutching a stray lawnmower in a strange garden and subsequently becomes enrolled in a carpet when Charlie and Pádraig think a falling sign from their hearse has killed him. He wakes up confused and walks off with Vincie innocently donating the carpet to a bonfire in Charlie's absence. Charlie encounters him as he attempts to hide his mistake by throwing more wood on the bonfire and offers to drive him home. In the hearse with Charlie he discusses the abuse he has received from his wife.

== List of corpses ==
- Pádraig and Máiréad's father, dies in a lightning flash whilst sitting on his bed after waking up in the dark of night and becomes locked in that position. This leads to difficulties fitting him into a coffin and when Pádraig discovers an unusual string underneath the corpse springs up suddenly and frightens the mourners.
- Tomás Eoghain, Donncha's brother who was found in his bed by his brother the morning after eating carageen moss. He lived on Tory and is said to have had many days at sea. On his final sea journey to the mainland he ends up on Tory Island where Charlie and Vincie resort to pretending he is their drunken father when two members of the island's community discover him sitting in their boat on his own and deliver him to the hotel they are dining in. Donncha and Vincie are seen to finish off the malted whiskey the dead man made the previous night.
- Seán Ó Baoill, possesses a long black beard and is accidentally cremated in a mix-up at the crematorium. Pádraig takes his place in the coffin as his sister Máire arrives from Boston.
- Doctor Kilala, a black doctor who becomes the crematorium's first foreign business deal. Vincie misunderstands his name thinking it is the similar-sounding location in County Mayo.
- Seán Ó Murchú, an unseen corpse living in Belfast at the time of his death but originally from Gleann Dómhain. When Charlie hears of his death in the morning death notices on the wireless, he rings Frank Doyle on the pretence that he is a relative asking for his service. Doyle drives to Belfast and expresses his fury when he realises he has been conned.
- Páidí Mhór Mhaggie, dies as Charlie and Pádraig embark on their day out at the Mary from Dungloe festival where they have entered the hearse as a float. Vincie has to cycle to Dungloe to tell them that the body is leaving the hospital at three o'clock.
- Seán Ó Searcaigh, announced on the morning death notices on the wireless. He is originally from Gleann Dómhain but will be buried in Cavan.
- John Dubh, a twin of Micí whose $4000 leads to a plot involving dishonesty and ghostly goings-on.

== Episode guide ==
No.	Title	Original release date	Prod. code
1	"Deontas"	1996	TBA
Charlie and Vince receive a grant from the Údaras to build a crematorium.
2	"Lá Ádhúil"	1996	TBA
Charlie is looking for the crematorium's first customer! He drives the hearse and Aloysius' body into the lake. Ali's mother is looking everywhere for Charlie and her son Ali!
3	"Que Sera, Sera"	1996	TBA
Kit Shorcha dies and Charlie discovers he has used all the coffins.
4	"Dubh agus Bán"	1996	TBA
Charlie confuses two bodies that have been brought in for cremation leading to chaos at the crematorium.
5	"Thar Sáile"	1996	TBA
Charlie and Vincie set off to Oileán Ealla to collect a corpse but instead end up on Tory Island.
6	"Toit"	1996	TBA
Charlie shares some roll-up cigarettes at a wake but later discovers they contain more than tobacco
7	"Mary from Dunlgoe [sic]"	1996	TBA
Charlie and Pádraig attend the Mary from Dungloe festival.
8	"Cúpla"	1996	TBA
John Dubh dies and Charlie finds $4000 in his possession.
9	"Lotto"	1996	TBA
Somebody won the lotto, but nobody knows the winner.
10	"An Dole"	1997	TBA
The dole of both the employees and employers of the crematorium is threatened.
11	"An Dhá Mheigeall"	1997	TBA
Charlie needs money for a new hearse.
12	"Hata sa Leaba"	1997	TBA
Charlie is in hospital, but it's business as usual.
13	"Cúl Báire"	1997	TBA
A famous goalie died – unfortunately he is too tall for the coffin.
14	"Lá Amú"	1997	TBA
Following the ambulance in search for business can be dangerous.
15	"Ar Thóir an Óir"	1997	TBA
Charlie knows how to make money from a dead TD.
16	"C.U. Burn An Nollaig"	1999	TBA
Charlie & Vincie Burn are busy during the Christmas period. When a local publican dies Charlie decides to borrow his body.

== Response and awards ==
The series generated a great response from audiences, with devoted fan clubs springing up in Dublin, Belfast and further afield. It also won the "Spirit of the Festival" Award at the 1997 International Celtic Film and Television Festival. C.U. Burn has been rebroadcast five or six times and has maintained a cult following in the years since its release. most recently in January 2013.

== See also ==
- List of programmes broadcast by TG4
- Cremation in Ireland

== Articles ==
- "Suil eile TG4 faoi scrudu ag suile eile". The Irish Times – 26 November 2008
- "Lá fén dTor". The Kerryman – 17 December 2008.
