= The Turning of the Tide =

Studio album by Aoife Ní Fhearraigh
- Released: 2003
- Genre: Traditional Irish music
- Label: Celtic Collections
- Producers: Phil Coulter and Dave Cook

Aoife Ní Fhearraigh chronology
Aoife (1996)	The Turning of the Tide (2003)	If I Told You (2006)

The Turning of the Tide is an album by Irish singer Aoife Ní Fhearraigh.

== Track listing ==
1. Caledonia
2. Both Sides Now
3. After the Goldrush
4. Danny Boy
5. Maggie
6. Turn Turn Turn
7. Bonny Portmore
8. Ready For the Storm
9. Neidín
10. If You Love Me
11. Never Be the Sun
12. An Cailín Rua
13. At 17
14. Mo Ghrá-sa Mo Dhia
15. Fare Thee Well

== Personnel ==
- Aoife Ní Fhearraigh - vocals
- Ivan Gilliland - guitars
- Brendan Monaghan - pipes, whistles
- John Fitzpatrick - viola
- Neil Martin - cello
- Dave Cooke - backing vocals
- Seán Keane - vocals
