= Tarlach Mac Suibhne =

Irish piper (c. 1831–1916)

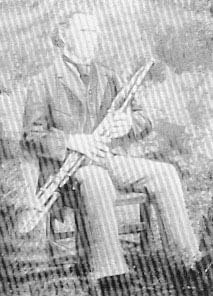
One of two existing photos of Tarlach Mac Suibhne.

Tarlach Mac Suibhne (known as An Píobaire Mór, meaning The Great Piper), c. 1831–1916, was an Irish piper.

He was born in Baile an Droichid, Gaoth Dobhair, County Donegal, and he is buried in the Maghergallen cemetery.

In 1893 he was brought by Lady Aberdeen to perform at the Irish Village at the World's Columbian Exposition in Chicago, where he was stationed at the entrance to a papier-mâché replica of Donegal Castle. His pipes are held at the Rossnowlagh museum, County Donegal.

Variations of his name in English include, Tarlach Mac Sweeney, Turlough Mac Sweeney and Tarlagh Mac Sweeney. He was a namesake and kinsman of Toirdhealbhach Mac Suibhne.
