= Natasha Nic Gairbheith =

Irish model

Natasha Nic Gairbheith (born 1981) is an Irish model and beauty pageant titleholder who was crowned Miss Ireland 2004, becoming the first ever fluent Irish-speaker to win the competition. She competed at Miss World 2004 where she did not place. She is originally from Gweedore, County Donegal, Ireland. Before winning Miss Ireland, Natasha had completed a degree in Law and Politics at National University of Ireland, Galway. She also acted in amateur productions at An Grianán Theatre in Letterkenny.

Since her success in the contest she worked as a model and appeared on Charity You're a Star, she was second to be knocked out.

In 2006 she gave birth to a baby boy, Pádraig, named after the father Patrick J McDermott, a property developer, whom she was meant to marry in Derrybeg on 28 April 2007, but it was put back due to the death of the groom's niece and two children. They eventually married on 7 September 2007. The couple reside in Burt, County Donegal.

| Preceded by Rosanna Davison (Miss World) | Miss Ireland; 2004 | Succeeded by Sarah Morrissey |
