= Aoife (album) =

Studio album by Aoife Ní Fhearraigh
- Released: 1996
- Recorded: S.T.A.R.C. Studios
- Genre: Traditional Irish music
- Length: 44:38
- Label: Gael-Linn Records
- Producer: Máire Brennan and Denis Woods

Aoife Ní Fhearraigh chronology
| Loinneog Cheoil (1991) | Aoife (1996) | The Turning of the Tide (2003) |

Aoife is the second studio album released by Irish singer Aoife Ní Fhearraigh. It consists of a wide selection of Traditional Irish songs, and its lyrics are entirely sung in Irish. In the sleeve notes, Máire Brennan - the world's most prominent Celtic artist wrote the following: For those of us who have a love of the Irish Song Tradition, this is an invaluable recording that is an essential addition to every record collection. Aoife is the finest young singer that has come to my attention for quite some time.

== Critical reception ==
Rambles: 1996, by Gilbert Head:
This disc is at its best with the slower ballads, which are richly mounted, and give the best opportunity for Ní Fhearraigh to linger with the melody. The placing of the occasional countertempo piece like the question-and-answer work "Cailin a' tSleibhe Ruaidh" lends balance to the disc, and gives one a feel for the diversity of the vocal tradition from Ranafast which those who have labored in love on Aoife have sought successfully to preserve and share. I recommend this work to those who cannot get enough of what the Gaeltacht has to offer, and I look forward with great anticipation to future offerings from this artist.

== Track listing ==
1. "Ansacht na nAnsacht" (My love and my delight)
2. "Seacht Suáilcí na Maighdine Muire" (The seven consolations of the Virgin Mary)
3. "Níl sé 'na Lá" (It's not yet day)
4. "Nuair a bhí Mise Óg" (When I was young)
5. "Cailín na Gruaige Báine" (The girl with the fair hair)
6. "Ainnir Dheas na gCiabhfholt Donn" (The lovely maid with the brown tresses)
7. "A Neansaí 'Mhíle Grá" (Nancy, my sweetest darling)
8. "Caitlín Triall" (Caitlín of the tresses)
9. "Mo Ghrá Thú" (Salm 17) (My Lord, I love Thee)
10. "Cailín a' tSléibhe Ruaidh" (The girl from the russet moor)
11. "Úrchnoc Chéin Mhic Cáinte" (The fair hill of Cian Mac Cáinte)

== Personnel ==
- Aoife Ní Fhearraigh - lead vocals
- Máire Brennan - vocals
- Brídín Brennan - vocals
- Seoirse Ó Dochartaigh - Male vocals on 'Cailín a' tSléibhe Ruaidh'
- Noel Eccles - percussion
- Des Moore - acoustic guitars
- Anthony Drennan - Spanish and electric guitar
- Mel Mercier - Bodhrán
- Máirtín O'Connor - accordion
- Nollaig Ní Chathasaigh - fiddle and viola
- John McSherry - uilleann pipes and low whistle
- Joe Csibi - bass guitar
- Denis Woods - keyboards
