= Gola Island =

Offshore island in County Donegal, Ireland

Gola
Native name: Oileán Ghabhla
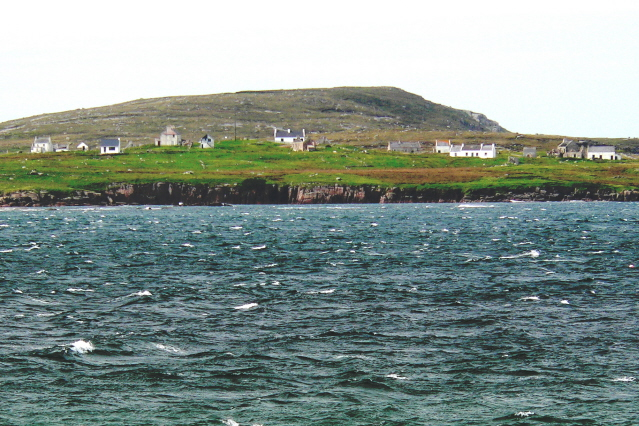
- Mainland view of Gola from Gweedore

- Location within island of Ireland

Geography
- Location: Atlantic Ocean
- Coordinates: 55°05′30″N 8°22′00″W

Administration
- Ireland
- Province: Ulster
- County: Donegal

Demographics
- Population: 15 (2022)

Gola (Irish: Gabhla or Oileán Ghabhla) is a small island off the coast of Gweedore, County Donegal, Ireland. It was unpopulated from the 1960s until 2002, with more people recently returning to reside in the island. A ferry service operates during the summer holiday season and on request for the remainder of the year.

== Description ==
Gola Island is one kilometre (0.62 mi) off the coast of Gweedore. Its many beaches and secluded bays attract visitors throughout the year. The island was populated up until the mid-1960s. The economy of the island historically relied on fishing, seasonal labor and small-scale farming. Today most of the buildings on the island are derelict, but some have been renovated as holiday homes and the island has been inhabited for most of the year since 2002.

The island terrain is mildly hilly with many bog road and sheep paths. At present, during the winter the only inhabitants on Gola are animals. Sheep and some goats tend to reside along the cliffs. To the back of the island, seabirds are numerous, with cormorants, shags, razorbills, guillemots as well as the odd passing gannet and skua. At the southern end of the near Port an Chrainn and the old school house, many shore species of bird can be admired such as the eider, oystercatcher, divers and various species of tern.

Gola is the birthplace of renowned Irish writer, Seán 'ac Fhionnlaoich. The island has also been immortalised in the traditional children's song Báidín Fheilimí ("Phelim's Little Boat").

Before 2005, there was no mains electricity available on the island, all dwellings relying on generators, oil lamps and renewable power sources such as solar and wind.

== Demographics ==
The table below reports data on Gola's population taken from Discover the Islands of Ireland (Alex Ritsema, Collins Press, 1999) and the Census of Ireland.

Historical population

Year	Pop.	±%
1841	68	—
1851	143	+110.3%
1861	165	+15.4%
1871	96	−41.8%
1881	107	+11.5%
1891	131	+22.4%
1901	142	+8.4%
1911	169	+19.0%
1926	168	−0.6%

Year	Pop.	±%
1936	139	−17.3%
1946	132	−5.0%
1951	131	−0.8%
1956	125	−4.6%
1961	93	−25.6%
1966	43	−53.8%
1971	0	−100.0%
1979	0	0.00%
1981	0	0.00%

Year	Pop.	±%
1986	0	0.00%
1991	0	0.00%
1996	0	0.00%
2002	5	—
2006	4	−20.0%
2011	15	+275.0%
2016	5	−66.7%
2022	15	+200.0%

Source: Central Statistics Office. "CNA17: Population by Off Shore Island, Sex and Year". CSO.ie.

== Media depictions ==
The broadcaster RTÉ offended viewers by depicting a dog having its legs tied together and being tossed overboard into the sea off the coast of Gola as part of its TV50 celebrations in a broadcast on 3 January 2012.

Raidio na Gaeltachta reported that Donegal County Council has begun a planning investigation into major planning breaches on the island. Mobile homes have been placed illegally on the island along with other building regulation breaches. Those affected were notified of the breaches.

== Gallery ==
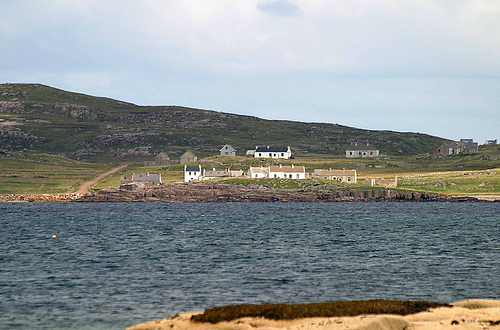
A view of Gola Island from Go Island.

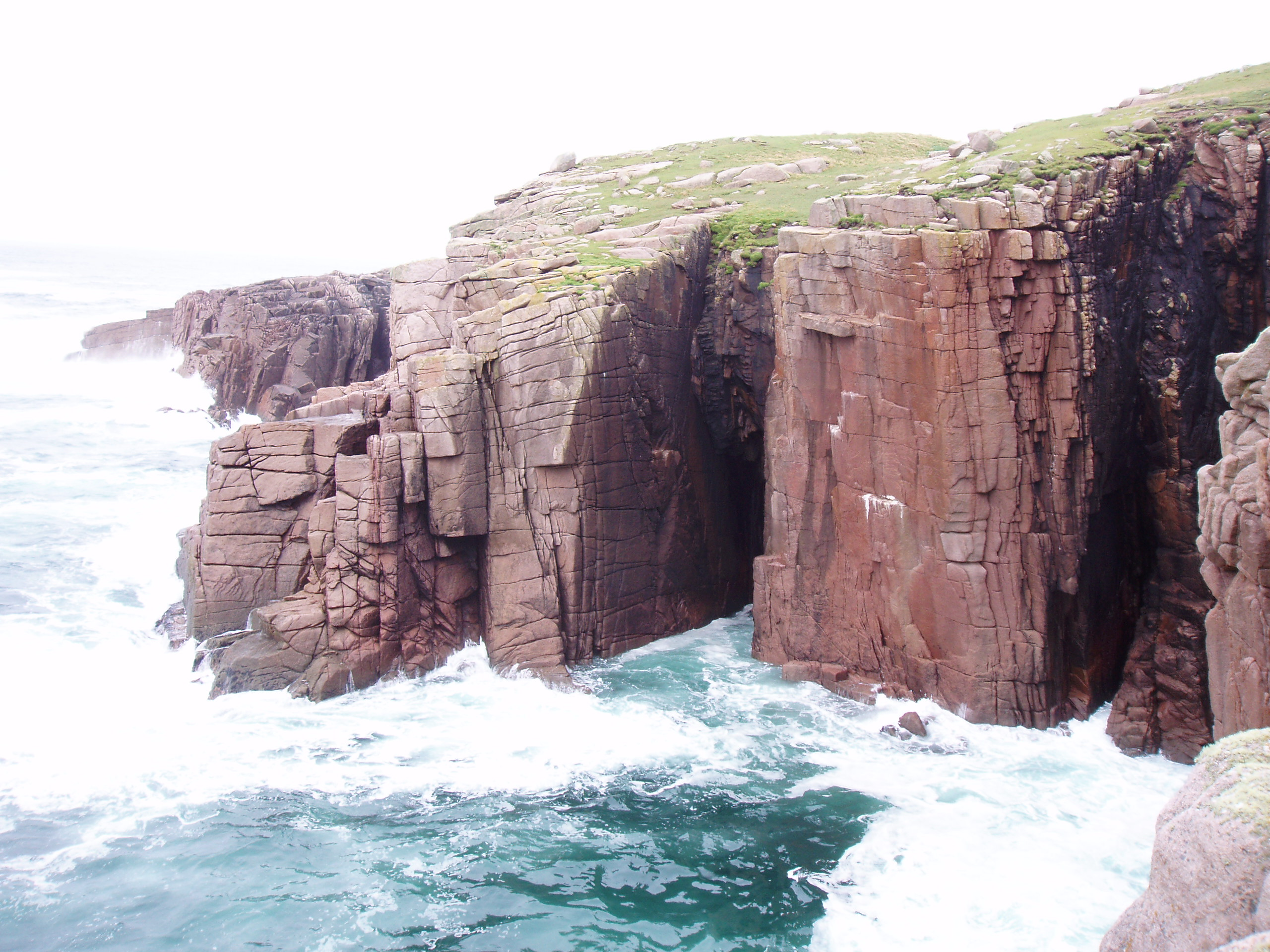
The popular Twin Cave area of the Gola sea-cliffs, on a windy day. Twin Cave Buttress, on the right, is about 20 metres (66 feet) high and contains six climbs with grades S/4a to E3/6a.

== See also ==
- List of islands of Ireland
- Inishmeane
- Báidín Fheilimí
