= Inishsirrer =

Small island of the coast of Ireland

Native name: Inis Oirthir
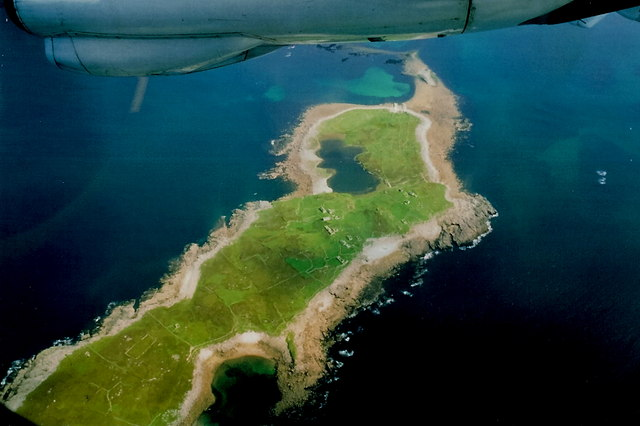
- NW half of the island from a flight preparing to land at Donegal Airport

- Location within island of Ireland

Geography
- Location: Atlantic Ocean
- Coordinates: 55°06′54″N 8°19′55″W
- Area: 0.43 km^{2} (0.17 sq mi)
- Length: 1.6 km (0.99 mi)
- Width: 0.4 km (0.25 mi)

Administration
- Ireland
- Province: Ulster
- County: Donegal

Demographics
- Population: 0

Inishsirrer (Irish: Inis Oirthir, meaning 'outer island') is a small island and a townland off the coast of Gweedore, County Donegal, Ireland.

== Geography ==
Inishsirrer is around 1 kilometre (0.6 miles) off the coast of Gweedore, not faraway from Inishmeane. It is around 1.6 kilometres (1.0 mile) long and four hundred metres (1,300 feet) wide.

== History ==
A small community has lived on the island since the mid 19th century. In the 1858 Griffiths Valuation of Ireland 3 families had houses on the island with a further 13 owning land as well as agricultural buildings on the island. Many descendants of these original settlers still own land on the island to this day.

Some people moved to the island during the famine in order to escape the effects of the Irish Famine and kept the land in the subsequent years.

The island had permanent families who would live on the island for the whole year and other families who would farm on the island during the winter while living on the mainland, however some of these families would then live on the island during the summer.

The island was still inhabited until the 1950s however the remaining islanders moved to the mainland mainly due to emigration of their children and the harsh weather conditions. Today tconditions.

Historical population

Year	Pop.	±%
1841	0	—
1851	26	—
1861	30	+15.4%
1871	14	−53.3%
1881	22	+57.1%
1891	28	+27.3%
1901	43	+53.6%
1911	41	−4.7%

Year	Pop.	±%
1926	48	+17.1%
1936	34	−29.2%
1946	18	−47.1%
1951	5	−72.2%
1956	0	−100.0%
1961	0	0.00%
1966	0	0.00%
1971	0	0.00%

Year	Pop.	±%
1979	0	0.00%
1981	0	0.00%
1986	0	0.00%
1991	0	0.00%
1996	0	0.00%
2002	0	0.00%
2006	0	0.00%

Source: Central Statistics Office. "CNA17: Population by Off Shore Island, Sex and Year". CSO.ie.

== Fishing ==
Inishsirrer was known as a good spot for however many of the islanders descendants visit the island. lobster fishing.

== See also ==
- List of islands of Ireland

== Image gallery ==
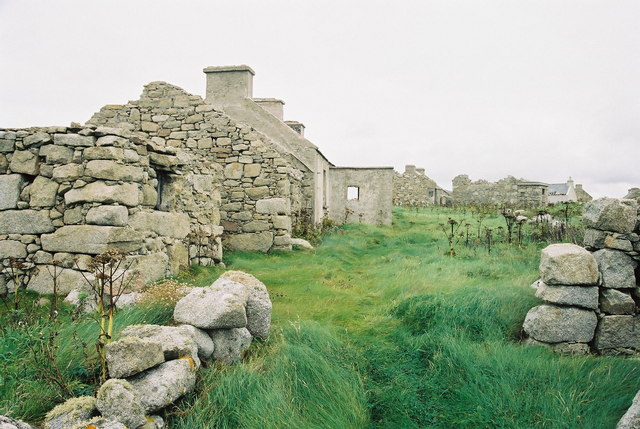
Old buildings

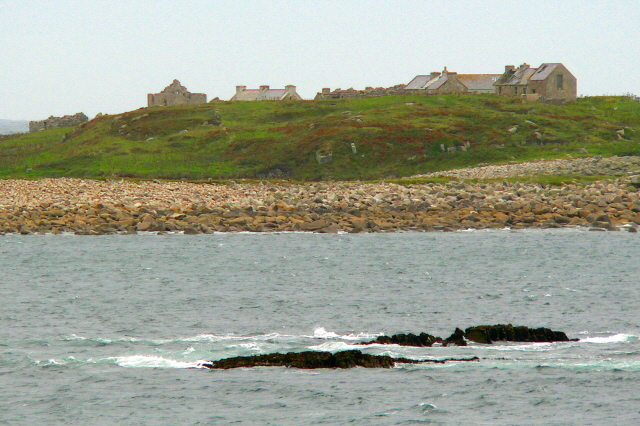
View from a beach near Glassagh

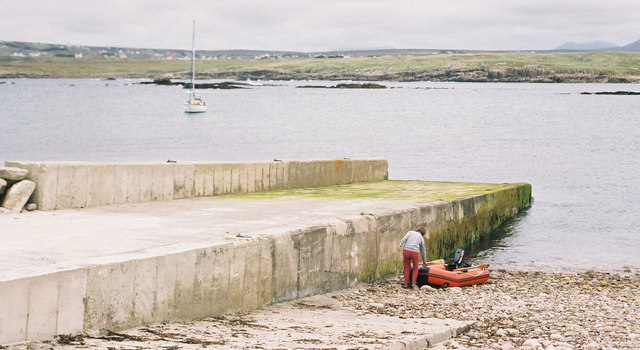
A jetty on the island

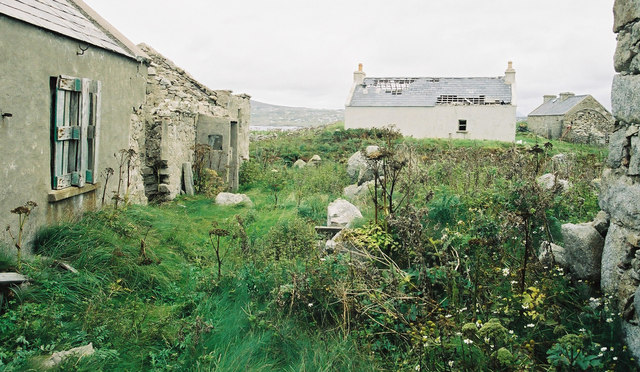
The deserted village
