= Na Casaidigh =

The Cassidys
- Origin: Gaoth Dobhair, County Donegal, Ireland
- Genres: Irish Traditional; Folk
- Years active: 1980s–present
- Labels: Phillips; Skellig Records
- Members: Aongus Ó Casaide; Ciarán Ó Casaide; Feargus Ó Casaide; Fionntán Ó Casaide; Odhrán Ó Casaide; Seathrún Ó Casaide
- Website: Official website

Na Casaidigh or The Cassidys are an Irish traditional group. They have been based in Dublin for many years, but they originally hail from Gweedore, County Donegal. The group consists of brothers Aongus, Seathrún, Ciarán, Fionntán, Feargus, and Odhrán. Irish is their native tongue and they had to study English as a second language during their school years. The brothers' music has attracted worldwide attention and brought them to audiences from Togo in West Africa to Carnegie Hall in New York City.

The Cassidys' father has long been a church choirmaster. He instilled his love of music, and Gaelic music in particular. Music instruction was woven through the boys' childhood. Piano or fiddle was introduced first, followed by other instruments that included whistles and pipes, bodhrán, and guitar.

All of the Cassidy brothers contribute to the group's harmonies. In addition, each plays several instruments. Odhrán studied the violin in Dublin, Vienna, and Manchester. He went on to play classical concertos with a number of orchestras. He is also accomplished on the uilleann pipes. Seathrún, who gave up his desire to work as a professional harpsichordist, plays piano, guitar, a number of different flutes, and bouzouki. Feargus plays bodhrán and rhythm guitar, while Aongus plays viola and fiddle. Ciarán is the group's accordionist and bassist, and also plays the synthesizer. Fionntán plays mandolin and fiddle.

Na Casaidigh's first venture into the world's spotlight came during a mid-'80s visit to Ireland by then-U.S. President Ronald Reagan. The Irish government requested a performance from the brothers for a state banquet. The event was televised live from Dublin Castle. The brothers repeated the state honour about a decade later during then-U.S. President Bill Clinton's peace-promoting trip to their country.

The group has toured throughout the United States, including stops in New York at St. Patrick's Cathedral and Radio City Music Hall. The brothers have received warm welcomes at the Philadelphia Folk Festival and from the Colorado Symphony Orchestra. In West Africa, they appeared at the celebration held to mark the Lome Convention's signing by the European Union.

Their lyrics are mostly in Irish. They have performed classic Irish songs, such as "Bó na Leathadhairce", "Báidín Fheilimí", "Peigí Leitir Móir" and "Beidh Aonach Amárach".

Renowned composer, Patrick Cassidy, is a cousin of the band, and the sean nós singer Sibéal is a daughter of band member, Odhrán.

== Discography ==
- Na Casaidigh (1980)
- Fead an Iolair (1984)
- The Cassidys Live (1985)
- 1691 (1991)
- Off to Philadelphia (1996)
- Óró na Casaidigh (1997)
- Singing From Memory (1998)
- The Cassidys-Na Casaidigh (2001)
