= Gweedore =

Gaeltacht area in County Donegal, Ireland

- District and parish
- Gaoth Dobhair (Irish)
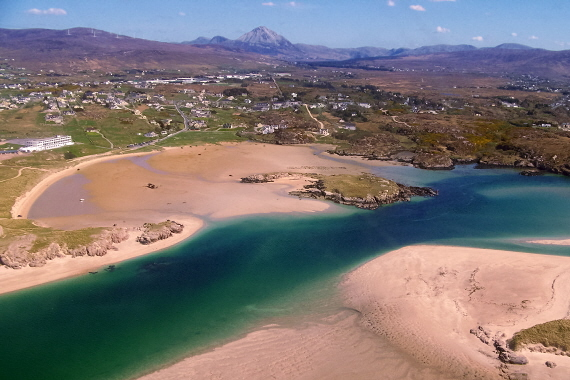
- An aerial view of Gweedore, with Errigal and Magheraclogher Beach

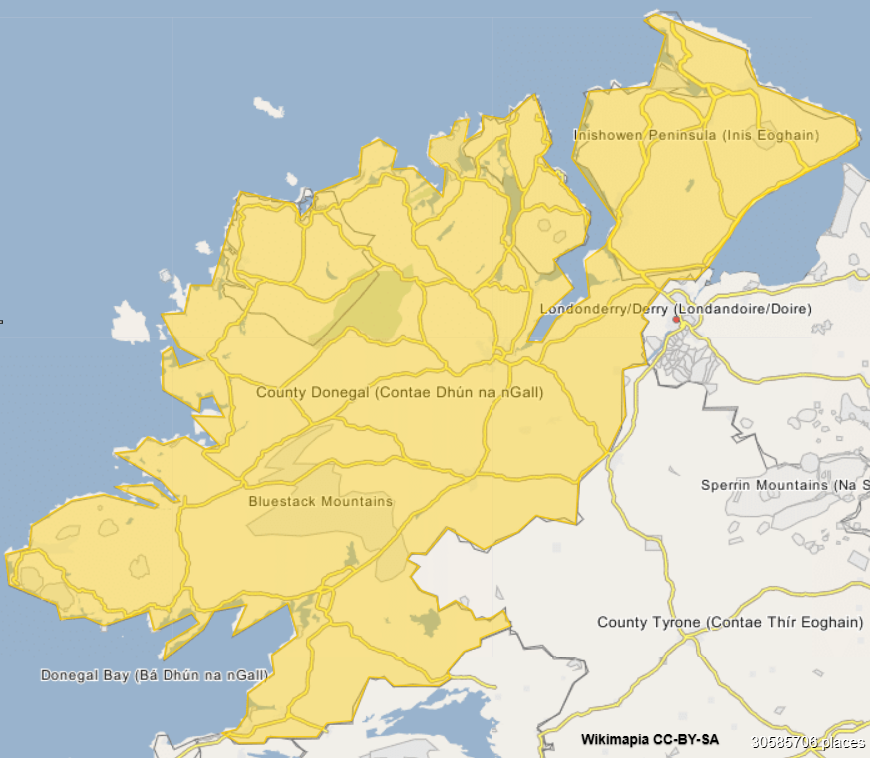
- Location in Ireland Gweedore (Ireland)
- Coordinates: 55°03′06″N 8°13′58″W
- Country: Ireland
- Province: Ulster
- County: County Donegal
- Barony: Kilmacrenan

Government
  - Dáil constituency: Donegal
  - EU Parliament: Midlands–North-West

Population (2003)
  - Total: 4,065
- Time zone: UTC+0 (WET)
  - Summer (DST): UTC-1 (IST (WEST))
- Area code: 074 95, +000 353 74 95
- Irish Grid Reference: B847228
- Website: www.gaothdobhair.ie

Gweedore (/ɡwiːˈdɔːr/ gwee-DOR), officially known by its Irish language name Gaoth Dobhair ([ˌɡiː ˈd̪ˠoːɾʲ]), is a Gaeltacht (Irish-speaking) district and parish on the northwestern coast of County Donegal, Ireland. Gweedore includes the settlements of Brinlack, Bunbeg, Derrybeg, Crolly (partially), and Dunlewey.

Gweedore is sometimes described as one of Europe's most densely populated rural areas, and is the most populous Irish-speaking district in Ireland, with about 4,065 inhabitants. It stretches some 26 kilometres (16 mi) from Glasserchoo (Note: Glaisechú/Glais Dobhair Chú; where anglicised placenames are used in this article, see #Place names in Gweedore for their official Irish names.) and Bloody Foreland in the north to Crolly in the south and around 14 kilometres (9 mi) inland from the Atlantic coast to Dunlewey in the east. Gweedore is at the western end of the Barony of Kilmacrenan. Gweedore and the neighbouring districts of Cloughaneely and the Rosses are collectively known locally as 'the Three Parishes'; they form a social and cultural region distinct from the rest of the county, with Gweedore serving as the main centre for socialising and industry.

The district is known for being a cradle of Irish culture, with Irish customs, traditional music, Gaelic games and the Irish language playing a key role in the lives of the local people. This, along with its scenery and many beaches, has made the area a popular tourist destination, especially with visitors from Northern Ireland. Gweedore is overlooked by County Donegal's highest peak, Errigal. It is the home of the northwest regional studios of the Irish-language radio service RTÉ Raidió na Gaeltachta, as well as an external campus of the University of Galway.

== Name ==
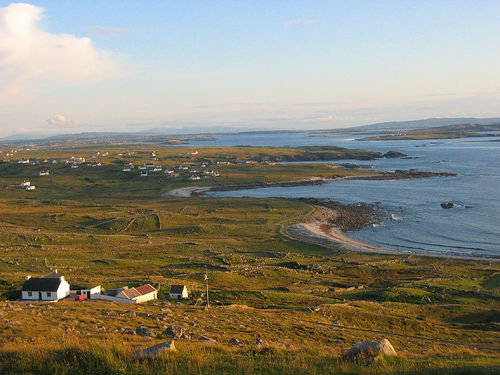
A view of Gweedore from Bloody Foreland (Knockfola)

"Gweedore" is the anglicisation of the original and official Irish name Gaoth Dobhair. Gaoth means "sea estuary" and refers to the estuary of the Crolly River, also known as the Gweedore River. This is the boundary between Gweedore to the north and The Rosses to the south. The old name of this river was the Dore, or Dobhar, which is also an old Irish word for a body of water. Therefore, Gaoth Dobhair means "the estuary of the (river) Dore".

The name "Gweedore" or Gaoth Dobhair does not refer to any specific village, but refers to the traditional district, and to the Catholic parish of the same name, which is also called Tullaghobegly West. The settlements of Brinlack, Bunbeg, Derrybeg, Dunlewey and Crolly, and other populated area such as Meenaleck, Dore and Magheraclogher, are collectively known as "Gweedore".

== Landscape ==
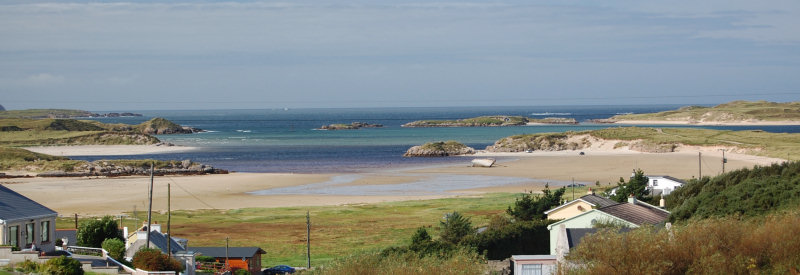
Panoramic view of Magheraclogher beach and Gweedore Bay, also the site of the famous shipwreck, the Cara Na Mara (Friend of the Sea) on the tidal sandbanks.

The Gweedore coastline consists of long sandy beaches and rugged cliffs with small islands, including Gola Island and Tory Island. Bád Eddie ("Eddie's Boat"), the Cara na Mara ("Friend of the Sea"), is the wreck of a ship on Magheraclogher Strand that came ashore for minor repairs in 1977 and has been stranded since.

The Crolly River (Irish: Abhainn Chroithlí), also known as the Gweedore River, and the Clady River (Irish: An Chláidigh) are two of the main rivers flowing through Gweedore.

Gweedore is close to Errigal, the tallest mountain in County Donegal, which overlooks the picturesque Dunlewey Lough. It is surrounded by the deep glens and lakes of the Poisoned Glen, through which the Cronaniv Burn flows, and further on, Glenveagh national park and castle, the second-largest national park in Ireland.

== Language ==
Gweedore has a population of 4,500 and is divided into three electoral divisions (EDs):

- Machaire Chlochair (Magheraclogher) with a population of 2,651 and an estimated 77% native Irish speakers.
- Cnoc Fola/Mín an Chladaigh (Bloody Foreland / Meenacladdy) with a population of 1,326 and 83% Irish speakers.
- Dún Lúiche (Dunlewey) with a population of 695 and 76% Irish speakers.

The predominant spoken language of the district is Irish, but English can be widely heard as well. All schools and religious services are conducted in Irish, and roadside advertisements are also in Irish. Thousands of second-level and some third-level students from all over Ireland attend summer schools at Coláiste Bun an Inbhir, Coláiste Chú Chulainn, and Coláiste an Phiarsaigh in Gaoth Dobhair every summer to further their knowledge and understanding of the Irish language. One of the summer schools, Coláiste Cholmcille (Columba's College), closed in 2011 following a child sexual abuse scandal. This is a Gaeltacht, an area where the Irish language is the first language, providing an unbroken link with millennia of Irish history and culture.

Since most of the inhabitants of the area are bilingual, it is common to hear English vocabulary used within an Irish sentence and vice versa. A rich subset of unique vocabulary and phrases has arisen from this bilingualism and owing to this, the civil parish has attracted some curious interest from both lexicographers and etymologists in the past. For example, the Irish suffix -ailte or -eáilte is used to form a Gaelicised version of English verbs, as in wreckailte "tired".

== History ==
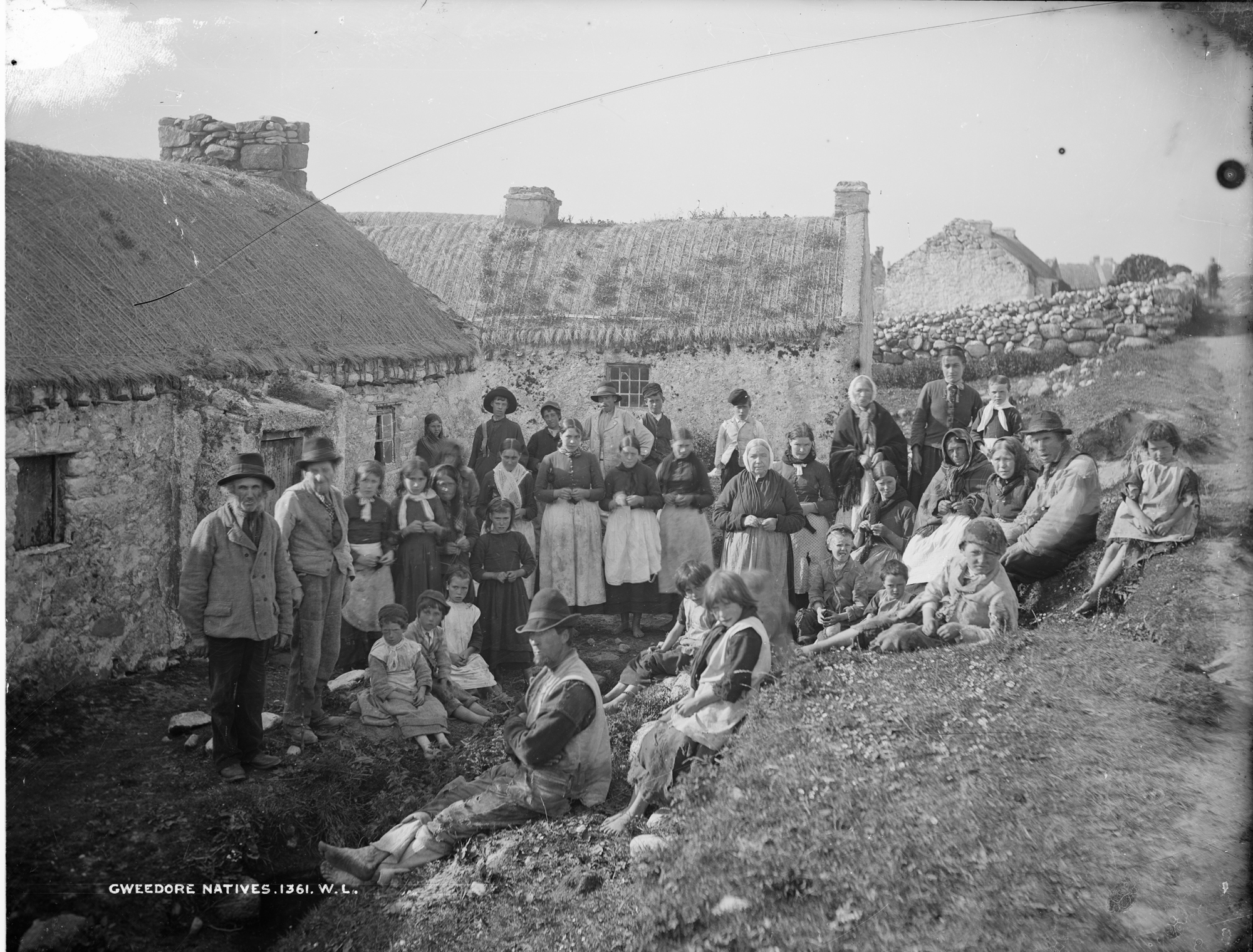
Gweedore natives in Magheraclogher in 1865

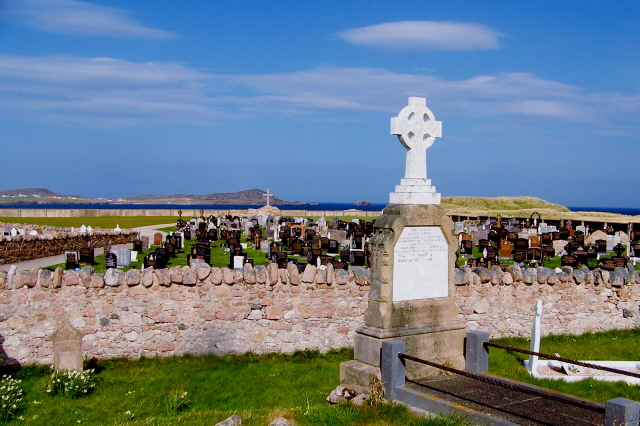
Magheragallon Cemetery, Derrybeg

The Plantation of Ulster in 1609 added a twist to the fate of the parish. Irish-speaking families who were driven from their fertile lands in the Laggan district and the surrounding areas in East Donegal made their way to the poor boglands of West Donegal. Some of them made it as far as Gweedore and could go no further west. Around the same time, English and Scottish colonists began to arrive when this uncharted territory was converted to baronies. It appears the parish was very sparsely populated up until the 17th century. The first people to arrive lived on the islands or by the shore in clusters, pockets of houses built close together and in each other's shade. Up until the early 19th century the parish was only lightly populated and it seems the people had an amicable relationship with the landowners.

The standard of life was to deteriorate with the arrival of new landlords in the 19th century, in particular Lord George Hill (1801–1879) and his son Arthur. The people of the parish led by James McFadden (Irish: Séamus Mac Pháidín), the parish priest in 1875–1901, challenged the landlords with the founding of the Land League and the Plan of Campaign. The killing by locals of Royal Irish Constabulary (RIC) District Inspector William Limbrick Martin outside the local church (Teach Phobail Mhuire) in Derrybeg on Sunday 3 February 1889, while reportedly rushing Father McFadden with a drawn sword, was the climax of the Land War in Gweedore. 43 people were arrested after the killing. The case was recalled in the 1928 memoirs of Tim Healy, who defended Father McFadden and his parishioners.

An Irish American journalist, W.H. Hurlbert, also investigated the landlord-tenant dispute in Gweedore in minute detail in his book Ireland under Coercion, published in 1888.

Many books have been published in Irish, and several in English, detailing Gweedore's rich history. One of the most prolific of local historians was Cáit Nic Giolla Bhríde.

=== Freak storm ===
On the afternoon of 23 June 2009, a severe thunderstorm struck Gweedore. It was centred on the adjoining villages of Bunbeg and Derrybeg, and lasted for several hours, causing two rivers to burst their banks, flooding houses, shops and factories, ripping up roads and destroying bridges. Lightning which lasted for two hours damaged power lines and caused a major breakdown of mobile phone service, leaving people trapped by the floods unable to contact help. Up to 20 houses were cut off from the outside world after three access bridges were carried away by the swollen rivers.

Described as the worst storm "in living memory", it was also the most severe since 1880 when five people drowned in Derrybeg. Owing to the highly localised nature of the storm, the areas of maximum rainfall missed the network of rain gauges but Met Éireann estimated that between 2 pm and 6 pm, up to 600 millimetres (24 in) of rain fell at the core.

== Economy ==
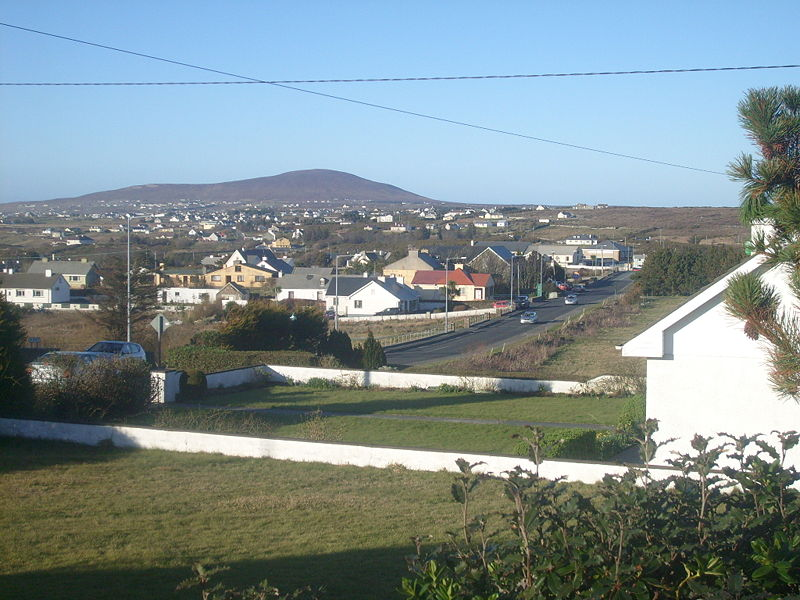
The main R257 road which runs right through Gweedore, seen here in Derrybeg, is known locally as the 'Golden Mile'

In the 1980s and 1990s, Gweedore had a thriving factory industry, where up to 20 large companies were established producing rubber, carpets, body toning equipment and cleaning agents. However, by 2001 most of these companies had closed due to competition from Eastern Europe. Up to 4,000 jobs were lost, and this had a serious economic and social effect on Gweedore and surrounding areas. The factory in the townland of Crolly has been manufacturing porcelain dolls since 1939 under the name Crolly Dolls. In 2003, the estate was renamed Páirc Ghnó Ghaoth Dobhair (Gweedore Business Park) and the Gaeltacht body, Údarás na Gaeltachta, started a campaign to try to entice businesses to Gweedore in hope of reviving the local economy. A Scottish company opened a call centre on the estate, but this subsequently closed.

Other businesses include a number of supermarkets, convenience stores, beauticians and hairdressers, garages, pharmacists, pubs, cafes and three well-established hotels: Derrybeg Hotel, Teach Jack and An Chúirt (Gweedore) Hotel.

== Education ==
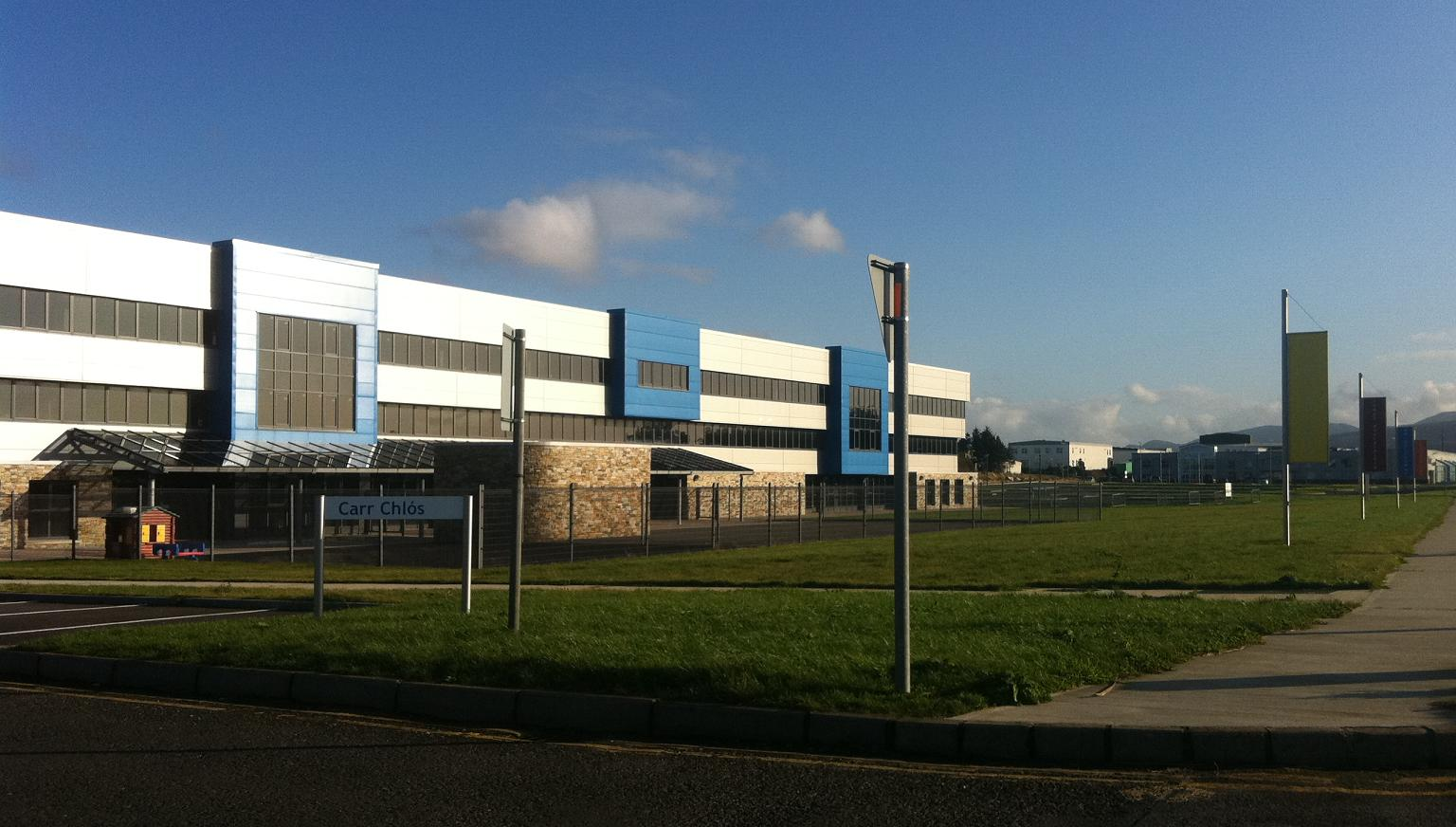
Áislann Ghaoth Dobhair (opened in 2011) is a state-of-the-art building which houses the local library, playschool and an exhibition gallery

=== Primary ===
All five primary schools in the area are Irish-speaking schools; children are taught English from senior infants level (5–6 years old).

- Scoil Chonaill, Bunbeg (An Bun Beag)
- Scoil Mhuire, Derrybeg (Doirí Beaga)
- Scoil Phádraig, Dore (Dobhar)
- Scoil Bhríde, Mín an Chladaigh
- Scoil Adhamhnáin, Lunniagh (Luinneach)

=== Second-level ===
The only community school (post-primary) is Pobalscoil Ghaoth Dobhair, established in Lunniagh in 1973. As with the local primary schools, all students are educated through the medium of Irish and most sit their public examinations in Irish.

=== Third-level ===
In 2004, NUI Galway (now University of Galway) expanded to Gweedore when it opened Acadamh na hOllscolaíochta Gaeilge, as part of its obligation to develop third-level education through an Irish medium.

== Transport ==
There are a number of private coach services that operate in the Gweedore area such as Bus Feda, Coyle's Coaches, John McGinley, Gallaghers Coaches, Mangan Tours, and Crónán Mac Coaches. The TFI Local Link route 966 (Dungloe/Falcarragh) also services the area linking it to Crolly, Annagry, Donegal Airport, Kincasslagh, Burtonport and Dungloe. Local Link route 971 (Burtonport/Letterkenny) from Crolly and the former Gweedore railway station also provides an additional link to Letterkenny from the area.

Gweedore is also close to Donegal Airport, located at Carrickfinn just west of neighbouring Ranafast in the Rosses.

=== Former rail services ===
Gweedore railway station, opened on 9 March 1903, provided rail transport to the area under the Londonderry and Lough Swilly Railway (L&LSR) until it closed for passenger traffic on 3 June 1940. The route was temporarily re-opened in 1941 during the emergency and finally closed permanently on 6 January 1947. The chief railway engineer was Taggart Aston, from Belfast. He was responsible for the design and construction of many of the bridges on the Letterkenny to Burtonport Extension narrow-gauge railway (L&BER), a company jointly owned by the State and the L&LSR.

The Lough Swilly Bus Company's bus routes that eventually replaced the train routes ceased operating in April 2014.

== Sport ==
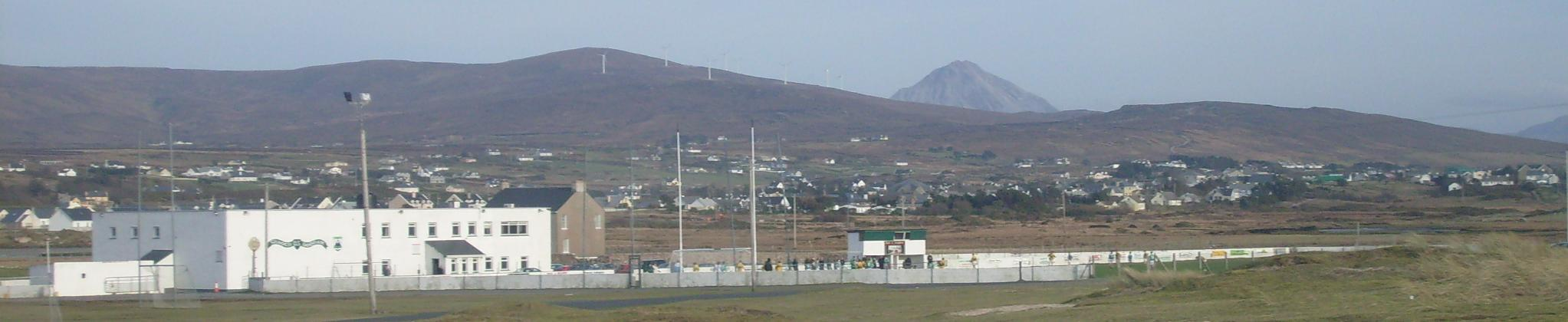
The Gaoth Dobhair GAA clubhouse and grounds, with Gweedore and Errigal seen in the background

Sports played locally include Gaelic football, golf and soccer.

=== Gaelic games ===
The local Gaelic games club, CLG Ghaoth Dobhair, is located in Machaire Gathlán and provides facilities for all GAA sports. The Gaoth Dobhair senior team is the most successful club in the Donegal Senior Football Championship and Comórtas Peile na Gaeltachta. It won the 2018 Ulster Senior Club Football Championship. Players such as Kevin Cassidy and the McGee brothers—Eamon and Neil—are known nationally for their exploits with the senior Donegal county football team. Newcomers, such as Odhrán Mac Niallais, Kieran Gillespie, Michael Carroll and Cian Mulligan have secured places in the senior county football team in recent years. Hurling was never a popular sport in Gweedore, with the exception of a briefly successful minor team in the late 1990s.

=== Golf ===
Gailf Chumann Ghaoth Dobhair, the local golf club, is also situated in Machaire Gathlán. The 14-hole course hugs the picturesque north-west coast and holds several high-profile tournaments throughout the year, most notably, 'The Clannad Classic', sponsored by the world-renowned local folk band.

=== Soccer ===
Soccer clubs active in the area include Gweedore Celtic, Gweedore United, Glenea United and Dunlewey Celtic. All teams take part in both county and national competitions. Scottish soccer player Paddy Crerand's mother hailed from Gweedore. Still a regular visitor to the area, Crerand broadcast an episode of his MUTV show The Paddy Crerand Show live from the Ostan Gweedore Hotel in March 2012. Aiden McGeady's paternal grandparents also hail from Gweedore and he spent many of his summer holidays in the parish.

=== Currach racing ===
Cumann na gCurach, based at Machaire Gathlán, is a voluntary group that organises currach races and takes part in numerous races all over the country.

== Arts and culture ==
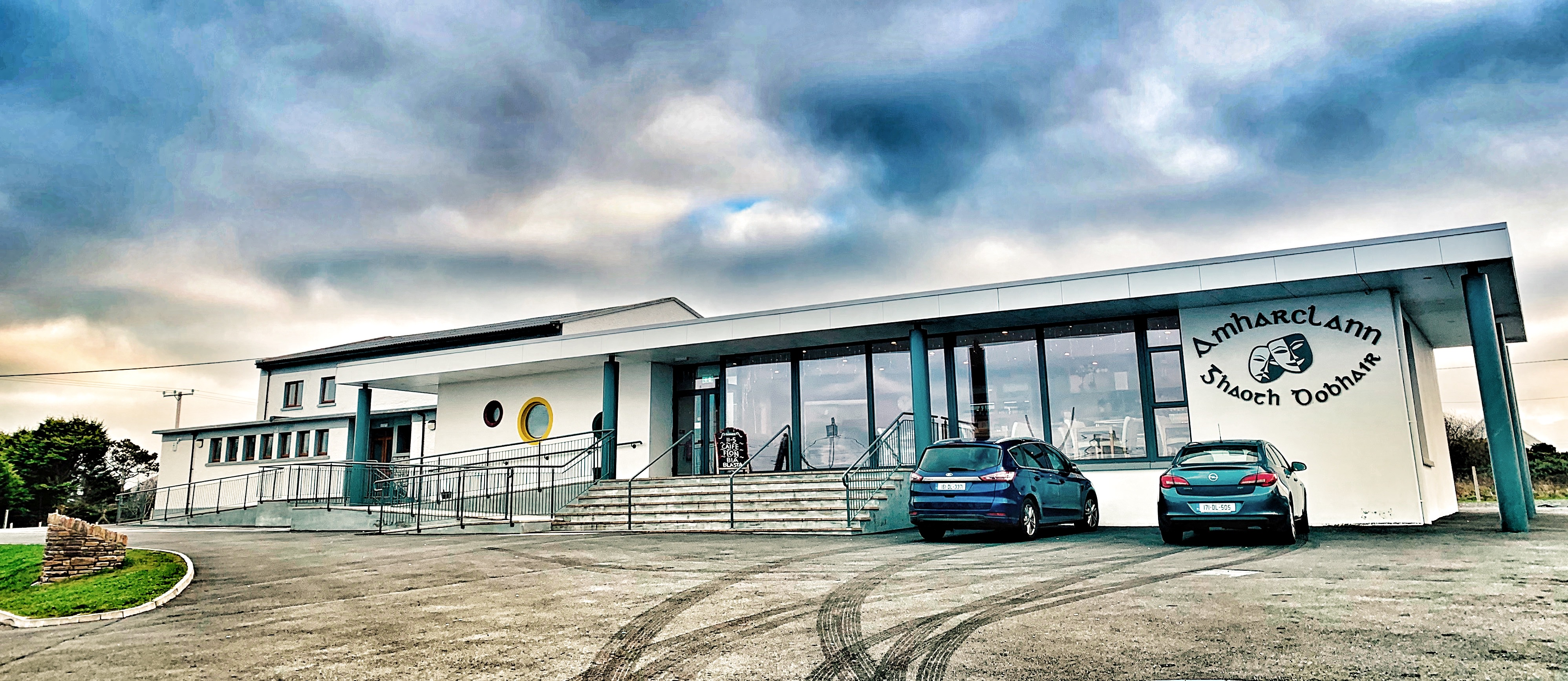
Amharclann Ghaoth Dobhair serves as the epicentre of cultural events in Gweedore

=== Music ===
Gweedore is famed for its traditional Irish music scene, which is prevalent in local taverns, and has produced a number of well-known musicians. Clannad formed from the local Brennan family in 1970, and have since gone on to sell over 15 million records; their lead singer Moya Brennan also enjoyed a successful solo career, providing musical scores for several Hollywood films. Gweedore's most successful musician is a member of the same family – Enya, born as Eithne Ní Bhraonáin; she first appeared on stage at Amharclann Ghaoth Dobhair and was a member of Clannad for two years from 1980, before going on to become a world-renowned artist, and second-best-selling in Ireland, with her record sales exceeding 90 million. Altan (initially Ceoltóirí Altan), another highly successful local band, is led by Coshclady fiddler Mairéad Ní Mhaonaigh. Other local singers include Aoife Ní Fhearraigh, Brídín Brennan, Na Casaidigh, Proinsias Ó Maonaigh, Gearóidín Bhreathnach, Seamus McGee and Maria McCool. The 1970s group Skara Brae also had strong links with the district.

There are two active choirs in the area. Cór Mhuire Doirí Beaga, previously led by Baba Brennan and Eileen Nic Suibhne and Cór Thaobh 'a Leithid, led by Doimnic Mac Giolla Bhríde. Both have recorded successful albums. The tune 'Gweedore' by Samuel Sebastian Wesley is set to the hymn 'Author of life divine' by Charles Wesley in Hymns Ancient & Modern New Standard #258i. The song "Gleanntáin Ghlas' Ghaoth Dobhair" was written by local musician Francie Mooney, expressing an exile's final farewell to the green valleys of Gweedore. It has become a modern Irish classic and it has been covered by the likes of Clannad, Paul Brady, Dáithí Sproule, The Johnstons and most notably by Altan. Other well-known songs to have come from the area are "Trasna na dTonnta" and "Báidín Fheilimí".

=== Festivals ===
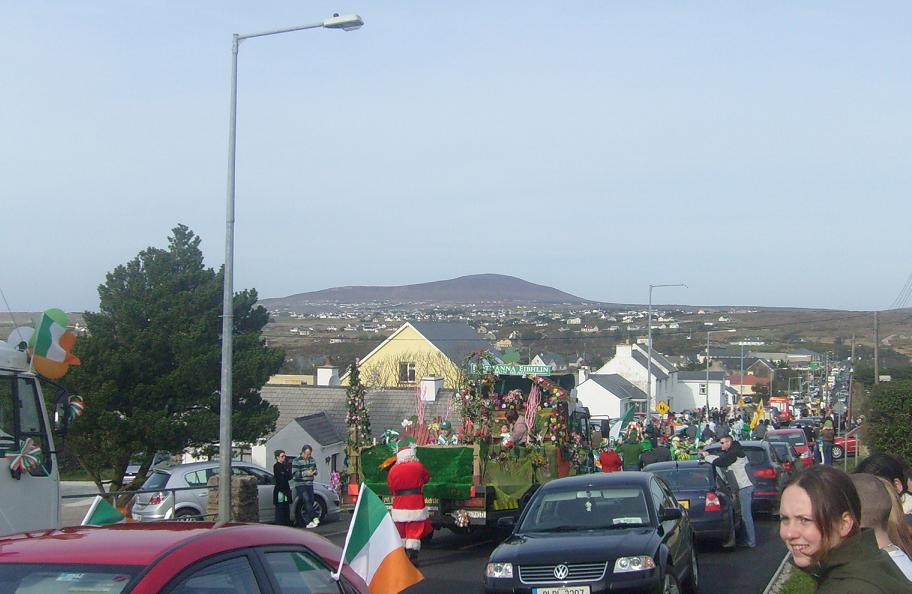
Gweedore holds one of the largest St. Patrick's Day parades in County Donegal

The popular Scoil Gheimhridh Frankie Kennedy ("Frankie Kennedy Winter School"), in memory of the eponymous Belfast musician that died of cancer in 1994 who was married to its founder Mairéad Ní Mhaonaigh, took place in Gweedore every New Year until January 2014. It has been replaced by the Scoil Gheimhridh Ghaoth Dobhair ("Gweedore Winter School").

Several attempts have been made recently to revive festivals in the summer months, including Féile Earthcore, Loinneog Lúnasa, Féile Ceoil Ghaoth Dobhair and the Sult music festival. The annual Saint Patrick's Day Parade which goes from Bunbeg crossroads to Derrybeg attracts a large number of participants and spectators each year.

=== Theatre ===
Gweedore has a rich history of theatre and drama productions. The local theatre Amharclann Ghaoth Dobhair was constructed in 1961. In decades prior to this, a local theatre group known as Aisteoirí Ghaoth Dobhair ('actors of Gweedore') was established in 1932. Their first production was called In Aimsir an Mháirtínigh, an original play by Eoghan Mac Giolla Bhríde which was staged in the parish hall in Derrybeg. Their plays and pantomimes, which were all staged in Irish, became a staple of Gaeltacht social life, drawing audiences from as far as Belfast and they performed throughout Ireland and Scotland. Members of the theatre group have gone on to create TV shows including CU Burn (Seán Mac Fhionnghaile), and have appeared on Ros na Rún (Gavin Ó Fearraigh). Many of Gweedore's musicians were associated with the group. Aisteoirí Ghaoth Dobhair are still active and performed shows at An Grianán Theatre in Letterkenny as part of the Earagail Arts Festival in 2010 and 2011.

=== Art ===
Gaoth Dobhair is home to two art galleries which house work by some of the area's best-known painters. An Clachán claims to be the largest art gallery in Donegal, whilst An Gailearaí at Áislann Ghaoth Dobhair has staged exhibitions based on the work of the world-renowned Derek Hill.

=== Radio ===
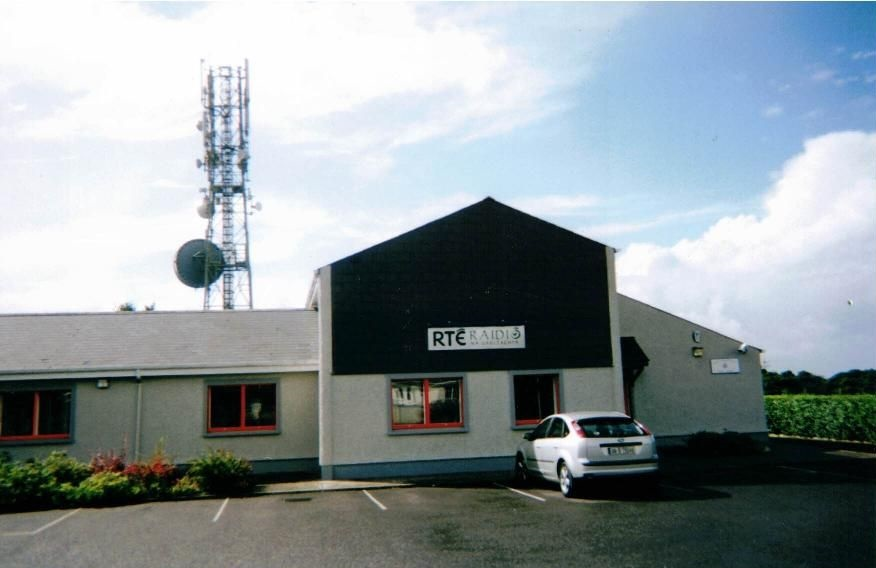
RTÉ Raidió na Gaeltachta studios in Derrybeg

The regional studios of the Irish language radio station RTÉ Raidió na Gaeltachta are in the townland of Derrybeg. Two radio shows are broadcast from Gweedore each day, as well as regional news every hour.

== Religion ==
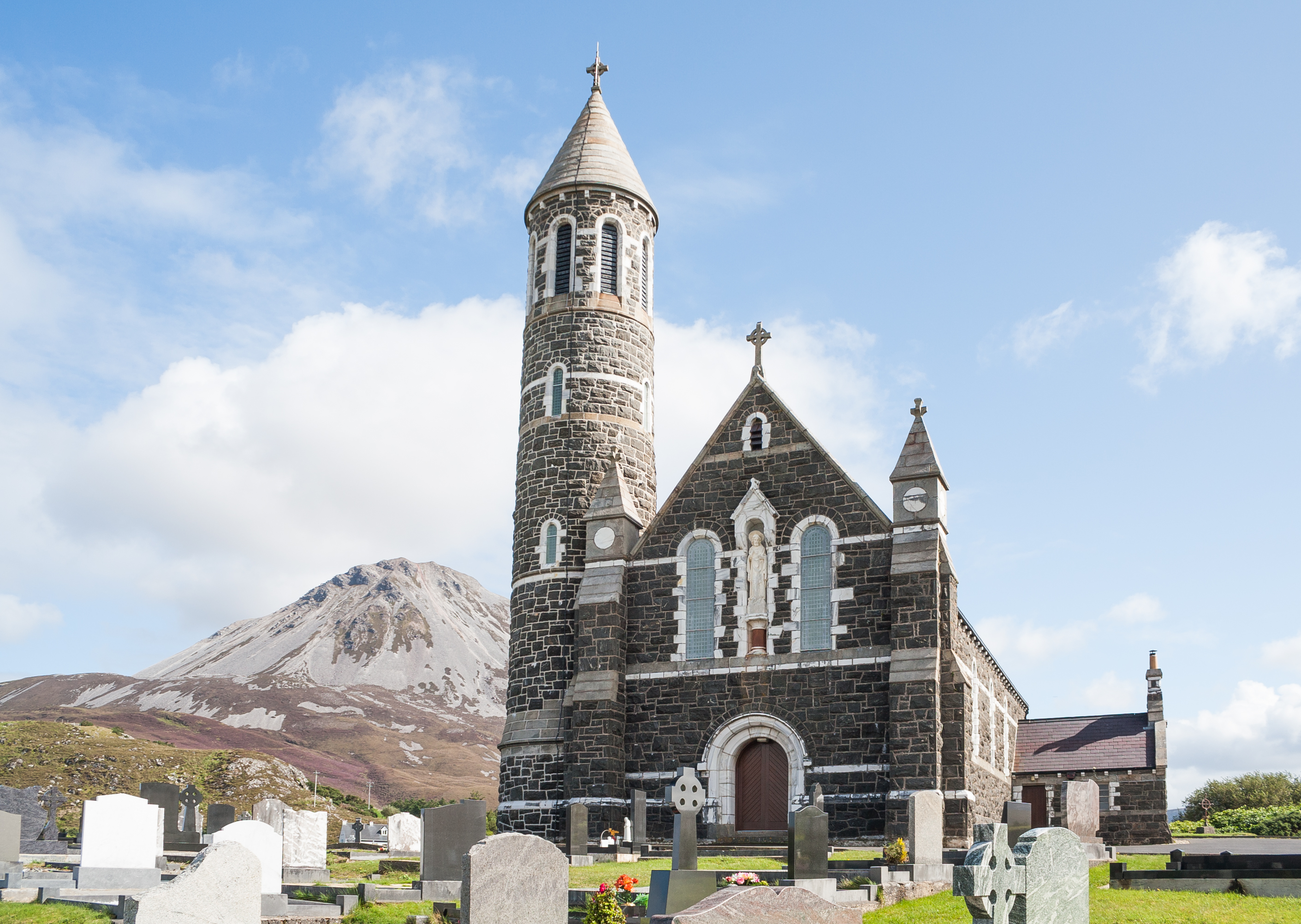
Sacred Heart Catholic church in Dunlewey

The Roman Catholic parish of Gweedore has four churches: Teach Pobal Mhuire (St Mary's) in Derrybeg (built in 1972, after the previous 'old chapel' had flooded on many occasions), Teach Pobail an Chroí Naofa (Sacred Heart) in Dunlewey (built in 1877), Teach Pobail Naomh Pádraig (St Patrick's) in Meenaweel (built in 1938) and Séipéal Cholmcille (St Columba's) in Bloody Foreland (built in 1933). The only Protestant church in Gweedore is St Patrick's Church of Ireland, in Bunbeg.

== Place names in Gweedore ==
Because Gweedore is in the Gaeltacht and partly due to the provisions of the Official Languages Act 2003, only the original Irish versions of placenames have any legal status, and these are used on road signage. However, anglicised versions were created for most placenames and are still in common for informal use in English.

=== Alphabetical listing ===
According to the Placenames Database of Ireland:

- Áit an tSeantí (Attantantee)
- An tArd Donn (Arduns)
- Ard na gCeapairí (Ardnagappery)
- Baile an Droichid (Ballindrait)
- An Bun Beag (Bunbeg)
- Bun an Inbhir (Bunaninver)
- Bun an Leaca (Brinlack or Brinaleck)
- An Charraig (Carrick)
- Carraig an tSeascain (Carrickataskin)
- An Chorrmhín (Corveen)
- Cnoc an Stolaire (Knockastolar)
- Cnoc Fola (Bloody Foreland or Knockfola, historically Cruckfalla)
- Coitín or An Choiteann (Cotteen)
- Croichshlí or Croithlí (Crolly)
- Dobhar (Dore)
- Na Doirí Beaga or Doire Beag (Derrybeg)
- Dún Lúiche (Dunlewey)
- Glaise Chú (Glasserchoo)
- An Ghlaisigh (Glassagh)
- Gleann Tornáin (Glentornan)
- Gleann Ualach (Glenhola)
- An Luinnigh (Lunniagh)
- Loch Caol (Loughkeel)
- Machaire Chlochair (Magheraclogher)
- Machaire Gathlán (Magheragallon or Magheragallen)
- Machaire Loisce (Magheralosk)
- Mín an Chladaigh (Meenacladdy)
- Mín a Loch (Meenalough)
- Mín an Iolair (Meenaniller)
- Mín na Cuinge (Meenacuing)
- Mín Uí Bhaoill (Meenaweel)
- Mín Doire Dhaimh (Meenderrygamph)
- Muine Dubh (Meenaduff)
- Na Machaireacha (Middletown)
- Port Uí Chuireáin (Curransport)
- An Rampar
- An Screabán
- An Seascann Beag (Sheskinbeg)
- An Sloitheán (Sleghan)
- Srath Máirtín (Stramartin)
- Srath na Bruaí (Stranabooey)
- Srath na Corcrach (Stranacorkra)
- An Tor (Torr)

=== Rivers ===
- Abhainn Chró Nimhe (Cronaniv Burn)
- Abhainn Dhuibhlinne (Devlin River)
- An Chláidigh (Clady River)

=== Islands ===
- Gabhla (Gola)
- Inis Meáin (Inishmeane)
- Inis Oirthear (Inishsirrer)
- Inis Sionnaigh (Inishinny)
- Iompainn (Umfin )
- Toraigh (Tory), although not directly situated off the coast of Gweedore, the main ferry crossings is from Machaire Rabhartaigh in neighbouring Cloughaneely, with another from Bunbeg harbour in Gweedore.

== Notable people ==
The following is a list of notable people from the area:

- Moya Brennan (born 1952-2026) – musician and singer (also see band Clannad)
- Enya (born 1961) – musician and singer
- Brídín Brennan (born 1968) – musician and singer
- Mairéad Ní Mhaonaigh (born 1959) – musician and singer
- Cormac Breslin (1902–1978) – politician (Fianna Fáil TD and Ceann Comhairle)
- Kevin Cassidy (born 1981) – Gaelic footballer and All-Star
- Vincent Coll (1908–1932) – prohibition-era gangster
- Breandán de Gallaí (born 1969) – former lead dancer with Riverdance
- Pearse Doherty (born 1977) – Sinn Féin TD
- James Duffy (1889–1969) – recipient of the Victoria Cross
- Rónán Mac Aodha Bhuí (1970-2023) – radio personality
- Seán Mac Fhionnghaile (1952–2009) – actor
- Kevin Gillespie (born 1972) – Catholic cleric
- Tarlach Mac Suibhne (1831–1916) – musician
- John McCole (1936–1982) – soccer player; born in Glasgow but buried in Gweedore from where his parents came
- Na Mooneys - family folk band
- Neil McGee (born 1985) – All-Ireland winning Gaelic footballer and All-Star
- Eamon McGee (born 1984) – All-Ireland winning Gaelic footballer
- Dinny McGinley (born 1945) – former Fine Gael TD. and Minister of State
- Odhrán Mac Niallais (born 1992) – Gaelic footballer
- Francie Mooney (1922–2006) – musician
- Na Casaidigh, traditional Irish band
- Natasha Nic Gairbheith (born 1981) – Miss Ireland 2004
- Aoife Ní Fhearraigh - singer
- Patrick O'Donnell (1835–1883) – Irish Republican
- Gavin Ó Fearraigh (born 1980) – actor/model
- Bríd Rodgers (born 1935) – SDLP politician, Member of the Legislative Assembly for Upper Bann.

== Gallery ==
Images of Gaoth Dobhair

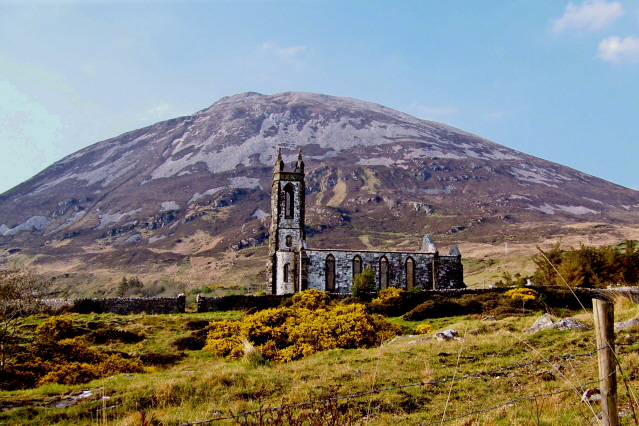
Derelict Church of Ireland in Dunlewey

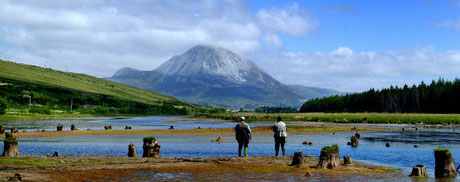
Men fishing with Errigal in the background

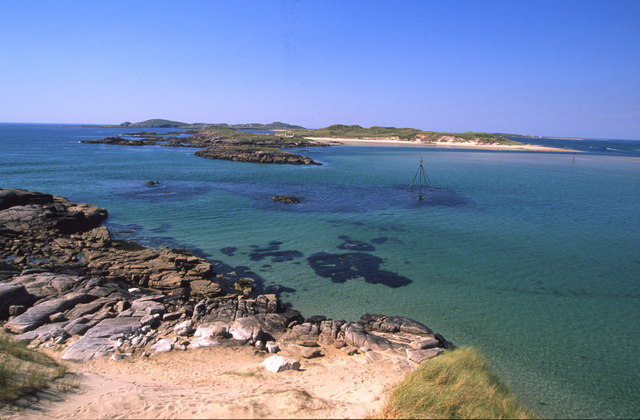
Inishinny Island

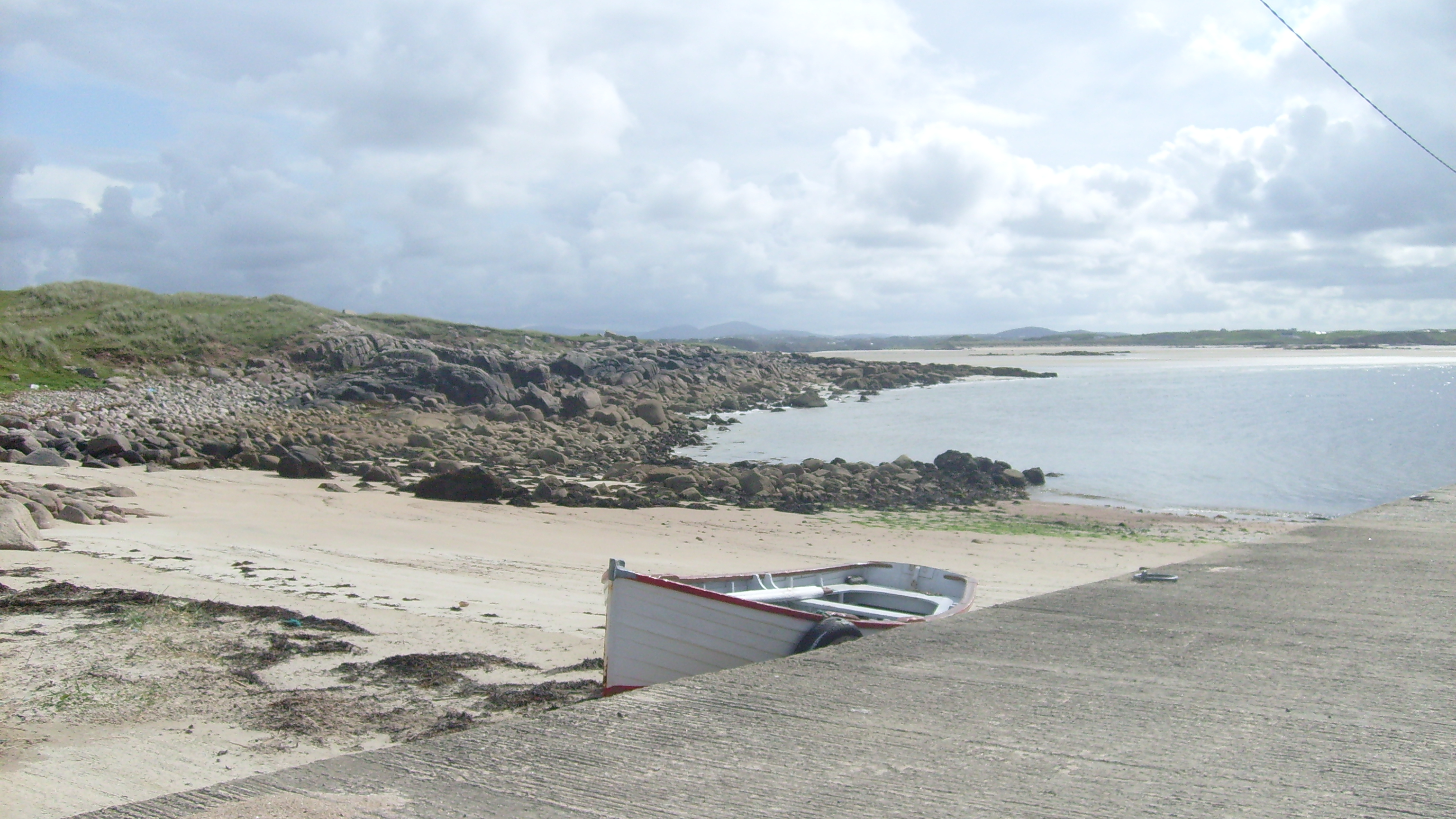
Cití Archie's pier, Magheragallon

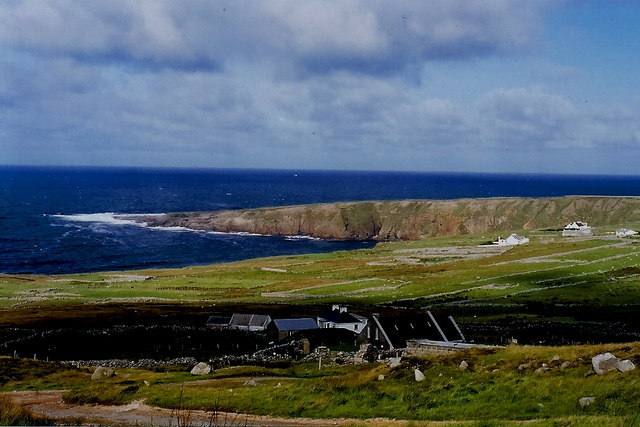
Cliffs at Bloody Foreland

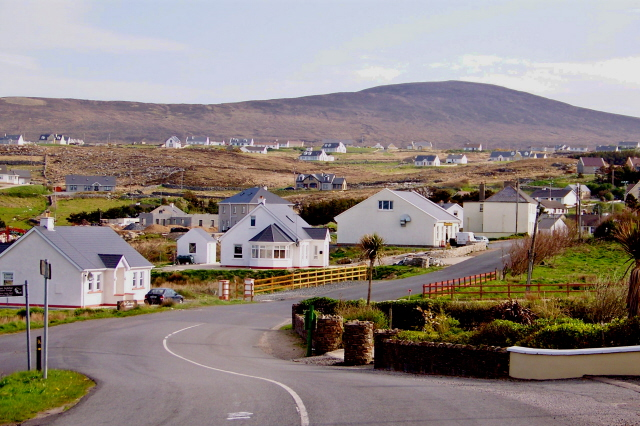
Glassagh

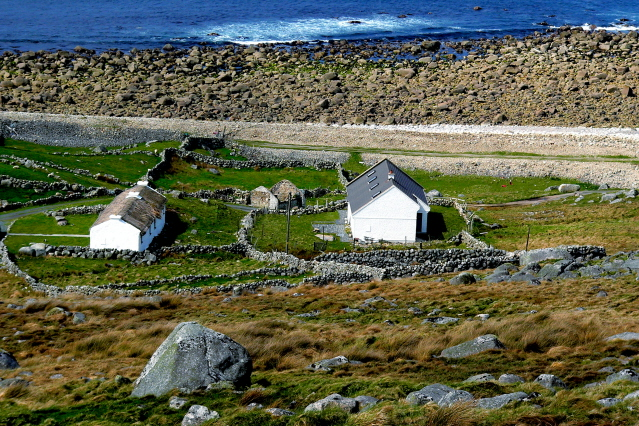
Bloody Foreland

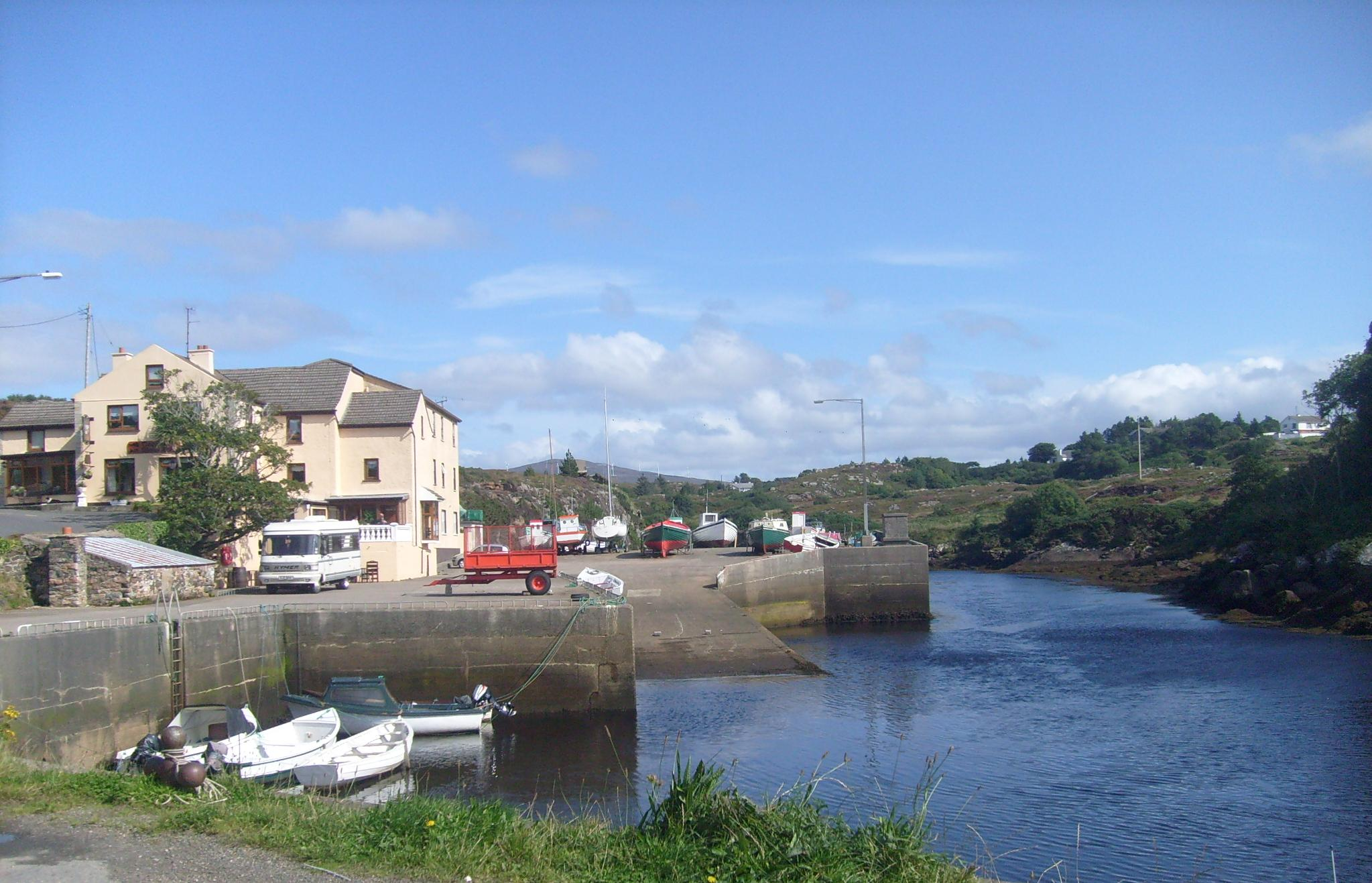
Bunbeg harbour

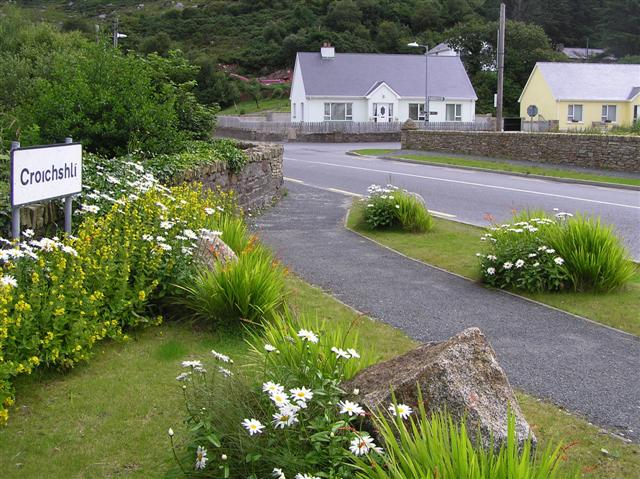
Crolly Bridge

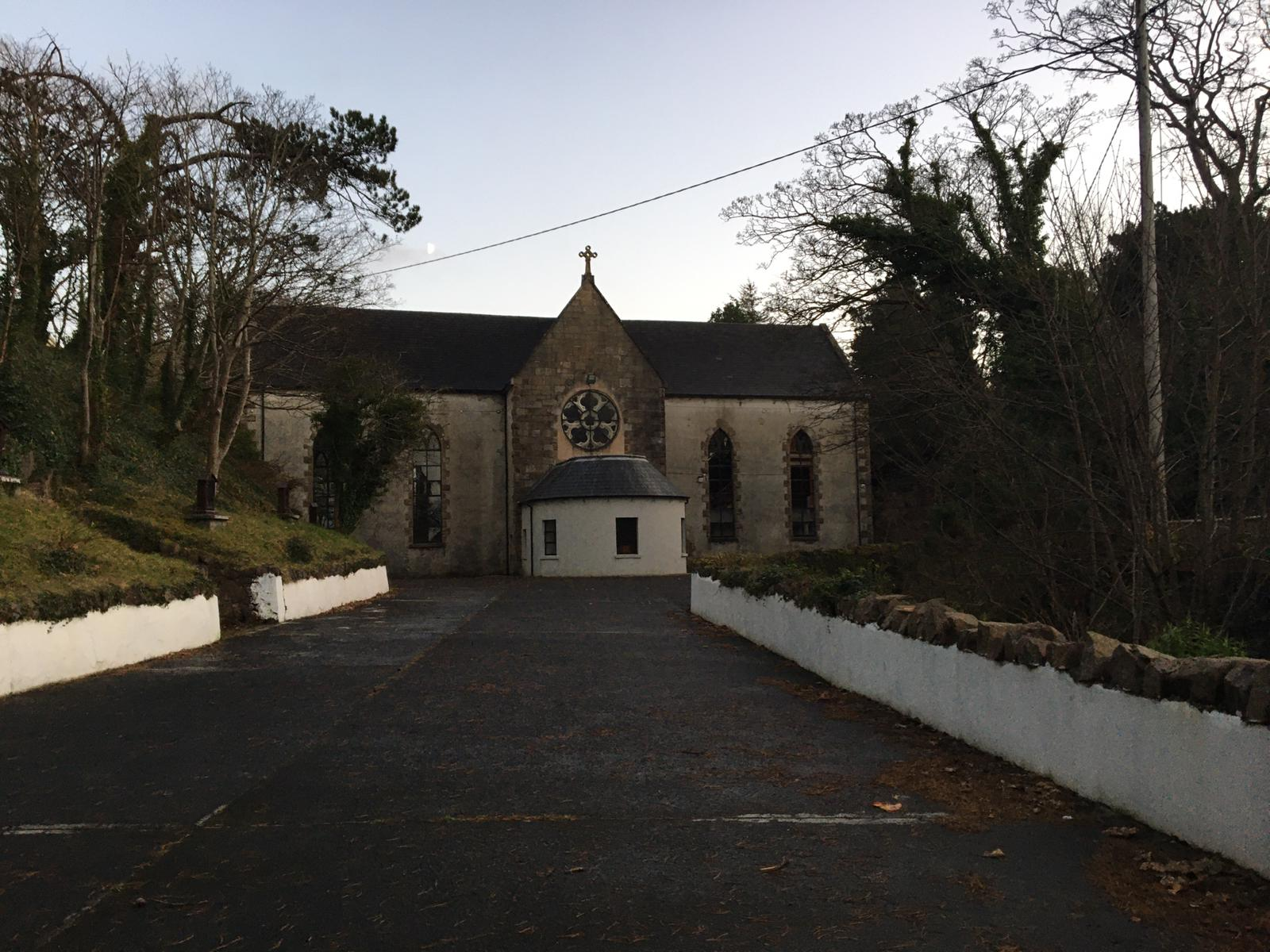
Old Chapel in Derrybeg

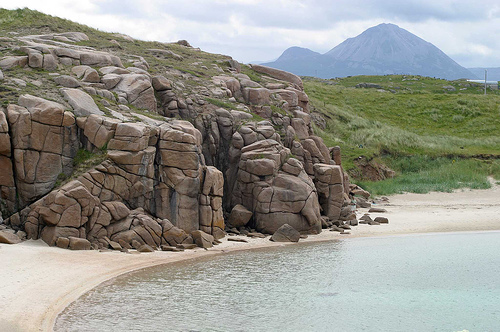
Gola Island

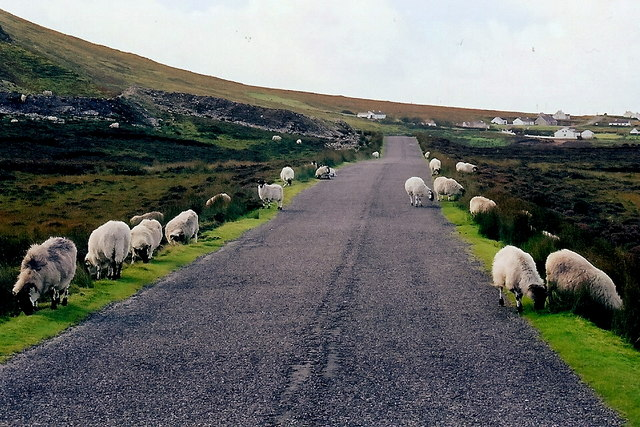
Sheep grazing in Meenaclady

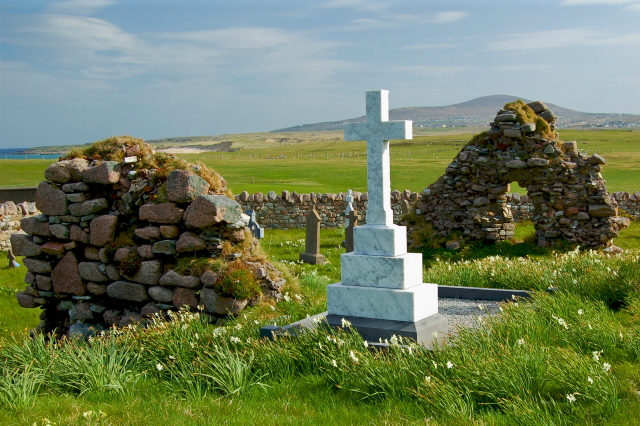
Church ruins in Magheragallon cemetery

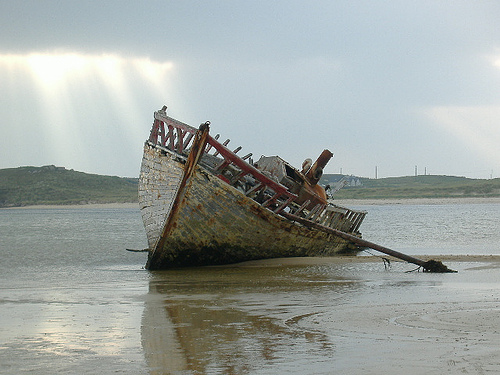
'Bád Eddie' shipwreck on Magheraclogher beach

== See also ==
- List of towns and villages in Ireland
- Teach Mhicí
