= If I Told You (album) =

Studio album by Aoife Ní Fhearraigh
- Released: 2006
- Recorded: S.T.A.R.C. Studios
- Genre: Traditional Irish music
- Label: Gael-Linn

Aoife Ní Fhearraigh chronology
| The Turning of the Tide (2003) | If I Told You (2006) |

If I Told You is the fourth album released by Irish singer Aoife Ní Fhearraigh. It consists of Traditional Irish and contemporary songs, and its lyrics are sung in Irish and English.

Sarah McQuaid of the Evening Herald wrote that "her new CD [...] eases slightly back on the lush production of its predecessor."

== Track listing ==
1. Love and Freedom
2. Where Are You Tonight
3. Lullaby
4. Crann Úll
5. If I Told You
6. Parting Glass
7. Into the West
8. Gabhaim Molta Bríghde
9. Siúil A Rún
10. If This Be Love
11. Long Hard Night
12. Táimse i M'Codhladh
13. An Seanduine Dóite
14. An Buachaillín Donn
15. Maid That Sold Her Barley
