= Derrybeg =

Townland in County Donegal, Ireland

Coordinates: 55°05′N 8°17′W

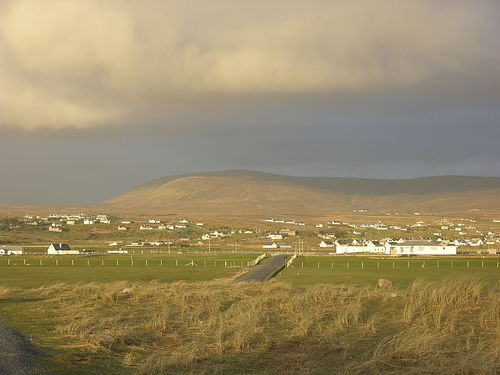
View of Derrybeg from Maghergallon

Doirí Beaga (anglicised as Derrybeg, meaning 'small oak trees'), is a Gaeltacht village and townland in the parish of Gweedore (Gaoth Dobhair) in County Donegal, Ireland. It includes RTÉ Raidió na Gaeltachta regional studios, a Gaelic Athletic Association, club and a golf club. According to the 2016 census 53.4% of the population spoke Irish on a daily basis outside the education system.

== History ==
During the Land War of the 1880s, the people of Derrybeg were led by Canon James McFadden (Irish: Séamus Mac Pháidín), "The Fighting Priest of Donegal", who urged his parishioners to support the Land League and the Plan of Campaign. After a series of anti-landlord sermons, the resident magistrate ordered McFadden's arrest.

On Sunday 3 February 1889, Royal Irish Constabulary district inspector William Limbrick Martin (locally known as An Mháirtínigh) arrived at Derrybeg's Roman Catholic church, Teach Phobail Mhuire with the intention of arresting McFadden immediately after Mass. As McFadden left the church interior, he was still dressed in his vestments and was carrying the Eucharist in the ciborium. Upon seeing McFadden, Martin drew his sword and charged the priest with the blade upraised. Horrified, McFadden's parishioners cried that Martin was attacking the priest with a sword and attacked the policeman. Martin was severely beaten and died upon the spot.

McFadden and his parishioners were arrested and tried for first degree murder. A change of venue was granted to Crown prosecutors, who were also allowed to pack the jury with Protestants.

In his 1928 memoirs, Tim Healy, who defended McFadden and his parishioners, described how he had argued the case at trial. Healy reminded the court that, under English law, it was a death penalty offense to strike a judge in his robes. He explained that, to the Catholics of Donegal, it was even more horrendous of a crime to assault a priest in his vestments. In response to Healy's statements, the Crown prosecutors offered a plea bargain which spared all defendants the death penalty. McFadden was sentenced to time served and his parishioners received prison sentences of varying degrees.

William Martin was buried in the Church of Ireland cemetery in Ballyshannon, under an inscription that described him as having been "cruelly murdered while nobly doing his duty at Derrybeg".

Following his death from Ewing's sarcoma in 1994, the Requiem Mass for Altan flutist Frankie Kennedy took place at the Roman Catholic Church in Derrybeg.
