= Aoife Ní Fhearraigh =

Aoife
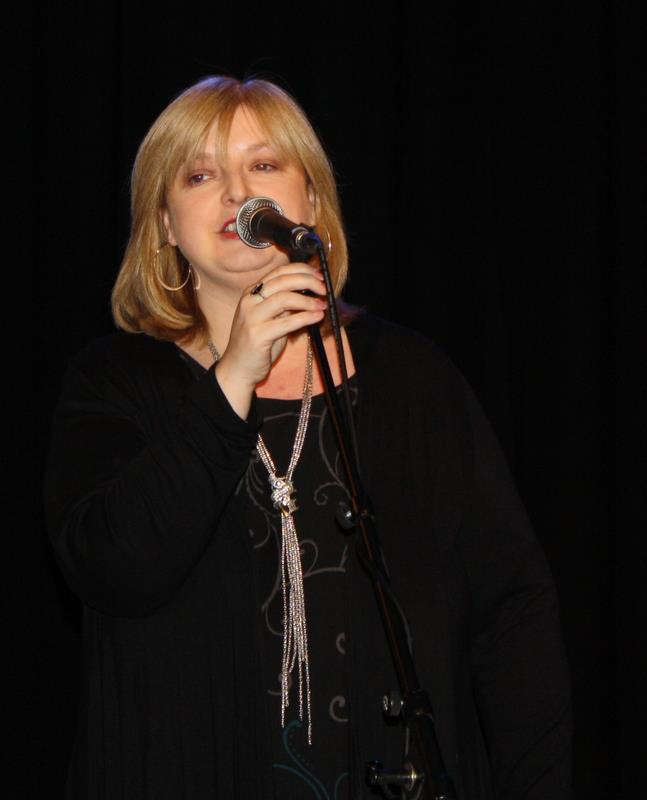
- Aoife performing at Cultúrlann McAdam Ó Fiaich in Belfast, on 21 April 2012.

Background information
- Birth name: Aoife Ní Fhearraigh
- Born: Gweedore, County Donegal, Ireland
- Genres: Traditional Irish, new-age, Celtic
- Occupation: Musician
- Instrument: Vocals
- Years active: 1991–present
- Website: www.aoife.ie

Aoife Ní Fhearraigh (Irish pronunciation: [ˈiːfʲə n̠ʲiː ˈaɾˠiː]), or simply Aoife, is an Irish singer. A well-known interpreter of Irish language songs, she released her first recording in 1991 and worked with Moya Brennan to produce her much acclaimed 1996 album Aoife. She reached international recognition in 1998 when her song "The Best is Yet to Come" was used for the Metal Gear Solid soundtrack. To date, Aoife has worked closely with artists such as Phil Coulter, Roma Downey and Brian Kennedy, and she has also toured the US, Japan and Europe.

== Discography ==
- Loinneog Cheoil (1991, with Dervish)
- Aoife (1996)
- The Turning of the Tide (2003)
- Loinneog Cheoil (2005, re-recorded)
- If I Told You (2006)

== See also ==
- Music of Ireland
- List of traditional Irish singers
