= Na Mooneys (album) =

Studio album by Na Mooneys
- Released: 6 October 2016 (Ireland)
- Recorded: January–February 2016
- Studios: Manus Lunny's Stiúidió na Mara ("Seafront Studio"), An Bhráid, Tír Chonaill, Na Rosa (The Rosses), County Donegal, Ireland
- Genres: Traditional Irish; Folk; Celtic
- Length: ~50:13
- Label: Na Mooneys

Mairéad Ní Mhaonaigh chronology
Imeall (2008/2009)

String Sisters chronology
Live (2007)	Between Wind and Water (2018)

T with the Maggies chronology
T with the Maggies (2010)

Professional ratings
Review scores
Source	Rating
Irish News	very favourable
Irish Music Magazine	very favourable
Trad' Mag	5/5 stars

Na Mooneys is the debut self-produced album from Irish folk music band Na Mooneys, released in October 2016.

== History ==
Na Mooneys was formed in late 2013 / early 2014 by Mairéad Ní Mhaonaigh (from Irish folk music band Altan) and her siblings Anna Ní Mhaonaigh and Gearóid Ó Maonaigh along with Ciarán Ó Maonaigh (Gearóid's son and Mairéad Ní Mhaonaigh's nephew), on the occasion of the very last Frankie Kennedy Winter School (Note: The last Frankie Kennedy Winter School occurred in late December 2013 / early January 2014.) where they performed their first ever show.

As Irish News' critic Robert McMillen wrote on 28 October 2016: "the group's roots are to be found in the rural Donegal Gaeltacht and go back several generations. [Indeed], the musical DNA from Mairéad Ní Mhaonaigh's [grandparents]—Róise Bheag Róise Móire, her melodeon-playing grandmother who died very soon after [Mairéad's] parents married in 1954 [and] her grandfather Francie—would have passed through to Mairéad's father, Francie Mooney, the man who wrote "Gleanntáin Ghlas' Ghaoth Dobhair" and much more."

On their Facebook page (created on 7 January 2016), the band describe themselves as "a family of musicians & singers from the Donegal Gaeltacht" playing Irish traditional music.

== Recording ==
The band Na Mooneys recorded their debut family album Na Mooneys in early 2016 in Manus Lunny's studios in County Donegal, Ireland.

About the recording and the choice of the album track listing, Mairéad explained in an October 2016 interview by Irish News' critic Robert McMillen: "We took a few tunes that my father played a lot as well. It was very important to show the repertoire that we played regularly as a family in session. Some are well known, but we played them to honour the family sessions so we decided not to overproduce the album and most of the tunes are played live."

== Release ==
Na Mooneys was officially launched on 6 October 2016 on Rónán Beo, RTÉ Raidió na Gaeltachta. On the radio show which occurred in RnaG studios, Na Mooneys talked about their debut album and performed live exclusive versions from it, including a (short) one: the (2 marches) medley "Suffering Ducks / The Cavanman's Daughter" (2:21), track 14 on the album.

== Critical reception ==
On 28 October 2016, Na Mooneys received a warm review from Irish News' critic Robert McMillen, stating: "It goes without saying that this is an album with a superb pedigree and the thing I liked about it most is that it sounds as if you were there in the Mooney household, either in Slíochán or in Cois Chlaidí. It is full of energy, the songs are really great and there's something different with the treatment of even the very well-known tunes."

On 2 November 2016, Na Mooneys received another warm review, this time from Irish Music Magazine's critic Alex Monaghan, stating: "The family album to end all family albums, Na Mooneys' eponymous release is a joy from end to end. Reels, highlands, jigs, mazurkas, marches, a fiddle air and four songs in Donegal Irish: this is the music which made Altan a worldwide favourite, the tradition of the Dohertys and the Byrnes, Tommy Peoples and Johnny Doran, and of course Francie Mooney and his family. [...] It's all brilliant music, masterfully played by Na Mooneys. The big question, of course, is why has it taken them so long?"

In the January–February 2017 issue of (French magazine) Trad' Mag, folk critic Philippe Cousin awarded Na Mooneys full marks (giving the album a "Bravo!!!" award), calling it a "superb album" and stating: "[The album] highlights all the brilliance of these talented musicians' skills."

== Track listing ==
All tracks are traditional, except where noted.

No.	Title	Writer(s)	Type	Length
1.	"John Doherty's / Frankie Kennedy's / The Limerick Lass"		Medley #1 (3 reels)	3:23
2.	"The Humours of Ballinafad / The Wee Pickle Tow"		Medley #2 (2 jigs)	3:13
3.	"Dónal na Gealaí"	Eoghan Mac Giolla Bhríde	Song #1 (children's song)	5:01
4.	"All the Way to Galway / Moneymusk"		Medley #3 (2 highlands)	2:07
5.	"Biddy from Sligo / Bean ag Baint Doileasc / Mug of Brown Ale"		Medley #4 (3 jigs)	3:52
6.	"A Óganaigh Óig"		Song #2	2:37
7.	"Coilleach Rua na Mire / Dulamán na Binne Buí"		Medley #5 (2 highlands)	2:52
8.	"The Morning Dew"		Tune #1 (reel – Mickey Doherty's version)	3:32
9.	"Geaftaí Bhaile Bhuí"		Tune #2 (slow air)	3:17
10.	"Máire Mhór"		Song #3 (song & jig)	3:29
11.	"Mazurka Róise / The Co. Down Mazurka"	Mairéad Ní Mhaonaigh ("Mazurka Róise")	Medley #6 (2 mazurkas)	3:02
12.	"Jenny's Welcome to Charlie"		Tune #3 (reel)	2:31
13.	"A Mhuire's a Rí"	Anna & Mairéad Ní Mhaonaigh (tune "Cuach sa Chrann")	Song #4 (Donegal song)	3:04
14.	"Suffering Ducks / The Cavanman's Daughter"	Ciarán Ó Maonaigh ("The Cavanman's Daughter")	Medley #7 (2 marches)	3:32
15.	"Green Grow the Rushes / The Queen of May / The Queen's Wedding"		Medley #8 (highlands & reel)	4:41

== Track notes ==
Na Mooneys features songs and tunes, both new and old.

Sources:

1. "John Doherty's / Frankie Kennedy's / The Limerick Lass" – 3 reels played by Na Mooneys (Ciarán on fiddle, Máiréad on fiddle, Anna on whistle, Gearóid on guitar) – with guests Caitlín Nic Gabhann on concertina & dance & Manus Lunny on bouzouki.
  1. The reel or hornpipe "John Doherty's" is widely known in Scotland as "Roxburgh Castle".
  2. The 2nd tune, "Frankie Kennedy’s" is a reel not to be mistaken for the jig "A Tune for Frankie" from Altan's 1996 (studio) album Blackwater.
2. "The Humours of Ballinafad / The Wee Pickle Tow" – 2 jigs played by Na Mooneys (Ciarán on fiddle, Máiréad on fiddle, Anna on whistle, Gearóid on guitar) – with guests Nia Byrne on fiddle & Manus Lunny on bouzouki.
3. "Dónal na Gealaí" – A children's song written by Eoghan Mac Giolla Bhríde – sung by Mairéad, Anna & Nia with accompaniment by Ciarán on fiddle & Manus Lunny on keyboards.
4. "All the Way to Galway / Moneymusk" – 2 highlands played by Na Mooneys (Ciarán on fiddle, Máiréad on fiddle, Anna on whistle, Gearóid on guitar).
5. "Biddy from Sligo / Bean ag Baint Doileasc / Mug of Brown Ale" – 3 jigs by Na Mooneys (Ciarán on fiddle, Máiréad on fiddle, Anna on whistle, Gearóid on guitar) – with guests Caitlín Nic Gabhann on concertina and Nia Byrne on fiddle)
6. "A Óganaigh Óig" – A song by Mairéad, Anna & Ciarán with Manus Lunny on keyboards.
7. "Coilleach Rua na Mire / Dulamán na Binne Buí" – 2 highlands played by Mairéad Ní Mhaonaigh & Ciarán Ó Maonaigh on fiddles and octave fiddle. The bagpipe march "Coilleach Rua na Mire" roughly means "The Mad Ginger Eejit".
8. "The Morning Dew" – Mickey Doherty's version of the famous reel played by Ciarán, Mairéad & Gearóid with Manus Lunny on keyboards.
9. "Geaftaí Bhaile Bhuí" – A slow air played by Mairéad & Ciarán.
10. "Máire Mhór" – A song and a jig played by Na Mooneys (Ciarán on fiddle, Máiréad on fiddle, Anna on whistle, Gearóid on guitar) – with guests Nia Byrne on vocals & Caitlín Nic Gabhann on foot percussion.
11. "Mazurka Róise / The Co. Down Mazurka" – 2 mazurkas (with the first one written by Mairéad for Anna's daughter Róise) played by Na Mooneys (Ciarán on fiddle, Máiréad on fiddle, Anna on whistle, Gearóid on guitar) – with guest Manus Lunny on bouzouki.
12. "Jenny's Welcome to Charlie" – A reel played by Ciarán & Mairéad with Manus Lunny on bouzouki.
13. "A Mhuire's a Rí" – A Donegal song (with the tune "Cuach sa Chrann" newly composed by Anna & Mairéad) played by Na Mooneys (Ciarán on fiddle, Máiréad on fiddle, Anna on whistle, Gearóid on guitar) – with guest Manus Lunny on bouzouki.
14. "Suffering Ducks / The Cavanman's Daughter" – 2 marches (with the second one composed by Ciarán Ó Maonaigh for his wife Caitlín Nic Gabhann) played by Na Mooneys (Ciarán on fiddle, Máiréad on fiddle, Anna on whistle, Gearóid on guitar).
15. "Green Grow the Rushes / The Queen of May / The Queen's Wedding" – A highlands & a reel played by Na Mooneys (Ciarán on fiddle, Máiréad on fiddle, Anna on whistle, Gearóid on guitar) – with Francie Mooney on fiddle & voice. This special extra track includes a recording on 15/05/2003 (by Hummingbird Productions for the TV series "The Raw Bar" in Cúil a' Dúin, Teileann, County Donegal) of Na Mooneys' father, Francie Mooney, introducing (in Irish Gaelic) and playing fiddle on "Green Grow the Rushes" (best known too as a Robert Burns song that Altan recorded on their 2000 (studio) album Another Sky).

== Live performances ==
It is known that Na Mooneys performed live at least 6 tracks from their debut album (on the occasion of their first album supporting show on 8 October 2016 at the Glenties Fiddle Concert):

- the 2 songs "A Óganaigh Óig" and "Máire Mhór" and
- the 4 instrumentals "John Doherty's / Frankie Kennedy's / The Limerick Lass", "The Humours of Ballinafad / The Wee Pickle Tow", "The Morning Dew" and "Green Grow the Rushes / The Queen of May / The Queen's Wedding".

== Supporting shows ==
In September 2016, the band announced that they should perform their first album supporting show on 8 October 2016 at the Glenties Fiddle Concert (Note: First Na Mooneys' album supporting show on 8 October 2016 at the Glenties Fiddle concert in Highlands Hotel, Glenties, County Donegal, Ireland at 9pm – €12. (This was Nia Byrne's 13th birthday.) Na Mooneys performed live at least 6 tracks from their debut album: the 2 songs "A Óganaigh Óig" and "Máire Mhór" and the 4 instrumentals "John Doherty's / Frankie Kennedy's / The Limerick Lass", "The Humours of Ballinafad / The Wee Pickle Tow", "The Morning Dew" and "Green Grow the Rushes / The Queen of May / The Queen's Wedding".) and their Dublin debut show on 29 January 2017 at St. Michan's Church, Dublin, Ireland during the Temple Bar TradFest.

In October 2016, Na Mooneys announced that they should perform a second show in early 2017: on 27 January during the Letterkenny Trad Week, County Donegal, Ireland.

== Personnel ==
Adapted from Bandcamp.

=== Na Mooneys ===
- Mairéad Ní Mhaonaigh – fiddle & vocals.
- Gearóid Ó Maonaigh – guitar.
- Anna Ní Mhaonaigh – whistle & vocals.
- Ciarán Ó Maonaigh – fiddle & octave fiddle.

=== Guest musicians ===
- Nia Byrne (Nia Ní Bheirne) (Mairéad Ní Mhaonaigh and Dermot Byrne (Note: Dermot Byrne has been a member of Mairéad Ní Mhaonaigh's Irish folk music band Altan for 20 years.)'s daughter, born on 8 October 2003) – fiddle ("The Humours of Ballinafad / The Wee Pickle Tow" and "Biddy from Sligo / Bean ag Baint Doileasc / Mug of Brown Ale"); song ("Dónal na Gealaí" and "Máire Mhór").
- Manus Lunny – bouzouki (on "John Doherty's / Frankie Kennedy's / The Limerick Lass", "The Humours of Ballinafad / The Wee Pickle Tow", "Mazurka Róise / The Co. Down Mazurka", "Jenny's Welcome to Charlie" and "A Mhuire's a Rí"); keyboards (on "Dónal na Gealaí", "A Óganaigh Óig" and "The Morning Dew").
- Caitlín Nic Gabhann – concertina (on "John Doherty's / Frankie Kennedy's / The Limerick Lass" and "Biddy from Sligo / Bean ag Baint Doileasc / Mug of Brown Ale"); foot percussion (on "Máire Mhór"); dance (on "John Doherty's / Frankie Kennedy's / The Limerick Lass").

=== Production ===
- Manus Lunny – recording, co-producer
- Édaín O'Donnell. - sleeve design

== Accolades ==
Na Mooneys was awarded "traditional album of the year" by the 2017 NÓS Gradaim Cheoil (Music Awards). The 2017 awards was presented in the Sugar Club, Dublin, Ireland on 20 January 2017.
