= An dro =

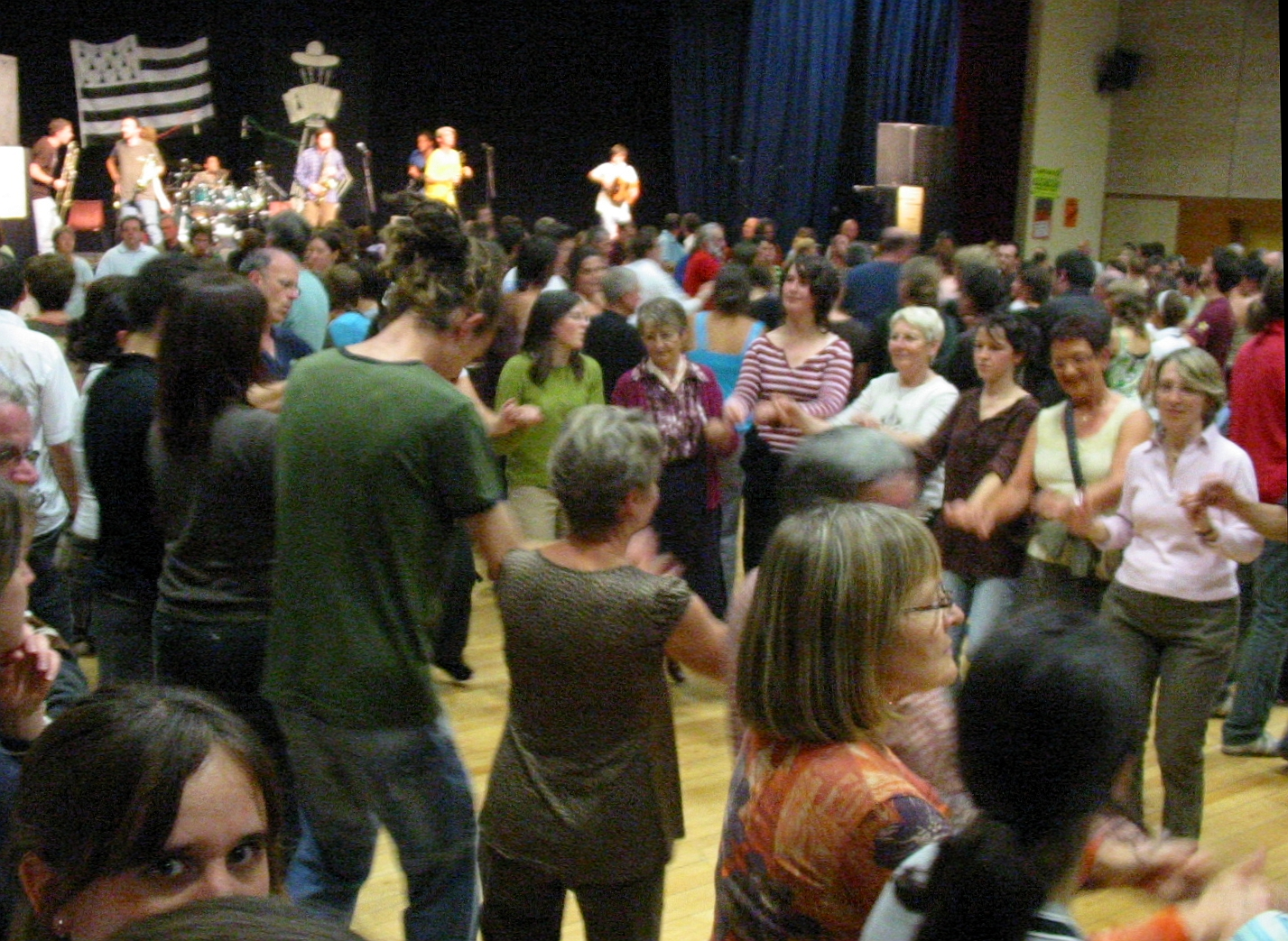
Dancers dance in a line or circle, swinging their arms with little fingers linked.

An dro, or en dro (Breton: "the turn"), is a Breton folk dance in 4/4. It is a form of a circle dance.

== Technique ==
The dance is performed in a line, with the dancers joined by hooking their little fingers. They swing their arms, and take a short step to the right, a longer step to the left, so they drift steadily leftwards.

== Recordings ==
An dro songs are part of the repertoire of almost any Breton singer or group, from traditional music such as that of Alan Stivell and Tri Yann's Portraits, to rock music such as the 1998 album La Ouache by Matmatah.

Non-Breton singers have included an dro songs on albums including Imeall by Mairéad Ní Mhaonaigh (Altan's vocalist).

== See also ==
- Fest noz
- List of ethnic, regional, and folk dances by origin
