= Imeall =

Studio album by Mairéad Ní Mhaonaigh
- Released: 28 December 2008
- Recorded: 2007–2008
- Studios: Manus Lunny's Stiúidió na Mara, An Bhráid, Tír Chonaill, Na Rosa (The Rosses), County Donegal, Ireland
- Genres: Traditional Irish; Folk; Celtic
- Length: 57:25
- Label: Moon (Note: Moon is the name of Mairéad Ní Mhaonaigh's own label.) (ref.: Moon1)
- Producers: Manus Lunny; Mairéad Ní Mhaonaigh

String Sisters chronology
Live (2007)

T with the Maggies chronology
T with the Maggies (2010)

Na Mooneys chronology
Na Mooneys (2016)

Professional ratings
Review scores
Source	Rating
The Irish Times	4/5 stars
Hot Press	7/10 medals
UK Folk Music	favourable
The Irish Echo	very favourable
Trad' Mag	5/5 stars
Last Night's Fun (blog)	very favourable

Imeall (Irish Gaelic for "Edge", "Rim", "Threshold") is Irish musician Mairéad Ní Mhaonaigh's debut (and to date only) solo album, self-produced on her own label "Moon" and released physically as a (numbered) limited edition in late 2008 / early 2009 and digitally available through her official website (after 20 years of recording with her band Altan).

== History ==
Imeall was recorded in 2007/08 in Stiúidió na Mara ("Seafront Studio") (An Bhráid, Tír Chonaill, County Donegal, Ireland), the home studio of Ní Mhaonaigh's friend and musician/producer Manus Lunny, overlooking the Atlantic Ocean and Donegal mountains and islands.

The album features many of Mairéad's friends and regular collaborators including Tríona Ní Dhomhnaill and Dónal Lunny. It also includes Manchester-born piper and flute player Michael McGoldrick and Annbjørg Lien, a member of String Sisters, with whom Mairéad plays fiddle and sings.

== Release ==
Only 3000 (handwritten numbered) physical copies of Imeall were pressed. The physical album is now sold out but a digital edition is available (as a downloadable mp3 album) directly from Mairéad's webstore.

== Critical reception ==
Imeall received a four star album review (out of 5) from The Irish Times' journalist and Irish music critic Siobhan Long, stating: "There's a huge sense of exploring new pastures on Mairéad Ní Mhaonaigh's solo debut. A limited edition, lovingly produced by Mairéad and Manus Lunny, with a bespoke design quality, Imeall is exactly that: a snapshot of an artist on the brink of something new, of terrain yet to be travelled."

Ní Mhaonaigh's debut album received a seven-star album review (out of 10) from Hot Press's music critic Niall Stokes, stating: "From the first [track], you feel that you're in the midst of something intimate and enveloping. ... It's a feeling that persists throughout a record full of beautiful melodies, fine singing, wonderfully sensitive playing and great tunes. Co-producer Manus Lunny set out with Mairéad to create a sound that would be different to Altan's, with whom Mairéad is the celebrated singer. The result is a collection of 14 tracks that manages to be both vibrantly contemporary in its colourings and yet deeply rooted in the tradition. ... The production is exemplary. ... This is Mairéad's masterpiece. ... There's a purity of purpose throughout that should be a lesson to musicians of a more venal disposition. This is music made for the sake of the art, for the magic of being in the moment making an unforgettable noise or for the sheer pleasure of telling a story eloquently through song. [...] Imeall is a very beautiful thing. Which is no surprise at all, when you think about it."

Imeall received a rather positive review from UK Folk Music website's critic Pete Fyfe, stating: "There are [here] spirited renditions of the Gaelic song "Gardaí 'n Rí" with its riff and percussion driven sound and the fiddle led instrumental set-piece "Highlands / Red Crow" for those wishing a quick jig around the table in Pat Cohen's pub from The Quiet Man. ... All-in-all, this is a very nice CD to chill-out to."

In the May–June 2009 issue of (French magazine) Trad' Mag, folk critic Philippe Cousin awarded Imeall full marks (giving the album a "Bravo!!!" award), calling it a "superb album" and stating: ""Imeall" means "threshold" or "edge" in Irish Gaelic, a title that Mairéad Ní Mhaonaigh explains by the fact that she's living by the sea and that, with this album, she's attempting a new adventure. [All the musicians involved in the album] serve a music of exceptional quality, like the music Mairéad got us accustomed to with Altan. Eight traditional tracks and six new compositions form a coherent set imbued with sensitiveness as much as vigour. Here, Mairéad pay tribute to her relatives: her father Francie who taught her all to know about to play the fiddle, her mother Kitty who taught her the Donegal dances, and her little daughter Nia. ... Imeall is a gem you can buy with your eyes closed."

In June 2009, Ní Mhaonaigh's debut album, Imeall, received a warm review from The Irish Echo's website, stating: "Mairead's composition in memory of her father, "An Fidleoir," conveys tender emotion through subtle ornamentation. ... Two songs were written outright by Mairead: "A Óganaigh Óig" and "Mo Níon Ó," the latter a lullaby for her daughter, Nia. Each testifies to her growing proficiency at songcraft. And on the album's last track, "An Dro / Imeall," Mairead's musical edginess sharpens in the plaintive singing of her own lyrics in Irish laid over the undulating dance rhythm of a Breton an dro. She adds fiddle to that track, accompanied by Manus Lunny, Michael McGoldrick, Jim Higgins, and Graham Henderson. ... Imeall brings out the best in Mairéad Ní Mhaonaigh."

On 8 September 2016, Imeall received a warm review from the Last Night's Fun blog.

== Live performances ==
It is known that Mairéad Ní Mhaonaigh played live at her 2008–2012 solo shows (at least one time) the following tracks: "Gardaí 'n Rí", "An Fidleoir", "Néillí Bhán", "Mazurkas", "Mo Níon Ó". She also sang live many times "Mo Níon Ó" as the lead singer during Altan's extensive 2009–2011 Celebrating the 25th anniversary tour.

== Track listing ==
No.	Title	Writer(s)	Length
1.	"A Óganaigh Óig"	Mairéad Ní Mhaonaigh	4:18
2.	"Gardaí 'n Rí"	Trad. Arr. Ní Mhaonaigh / Manus Lunny	3:13
3.	"Mazurkas"	Trad. Arr. Ní Mhaonaigh / Annbjørg Lien	3:35
4.	"Is Fada Ó Bhaile"	Trad. Arr. Ní Mhaonaigh / Lien	4:33
5.	"An Fidleoir"	Ní Mhaonaigh	3:28
6.	"Highlands / Red Crow"	Ní Mhaonaigh	3:37
7.	"Mo Níon Ó"	Ní Mhaonaigh	4:28
8.	"Dobbin's Flowery Vale"	Trad. Arr. Ní Mhaonaigh / Tríona Ní Dhomhnaill	6:07
9.	"Girseachaí an Phointe / Port Chití Rua"	Ní Mhaonaigh	3:51
10.	"Méillte Cheann Dubhráin / The Twenty One Highland / The Four Mile Stone"	Trad. Arr. Ní Mhaonaigh / Jim Higgins	5:02
11.	"Néillí Bhán"	Trad. Arr. Ní Mhaonaigh / Lunny	3:28
12.	"Aige Bruach Dhún Réimhe"	Trad. Arr. Ní Mhaonaigh / Lunny	5:01
13.	"The Pigeon on the Gate / The Convenience / The Highlandman Who Kissed His Granny"	Trad. Arr. Ní Mhaonaigh / Lunny	3:36
14.	"An Dro / Imeall"	Trad. Arr. Ní Mhaonaigh / Lunny; lyrics – Ní Mhaonaigh	4:08

== About the tracks ==
The tune/song "Dobbin's Flowery Vale" has become synonymous with Mairead Ní Mhaonaigh's late husband Frankie Kennedy who died of cancer on 19 September 1994.

== Personnel ==
- Mairéad Ní Mhaonaigh – vocals; Irish fiddle; Hardanger fiddle (on "Mazurkas")
- Manus Lunny – bouzouki; programming; vocals; guitar
- Tríona Ní Dhomhnaill – piano
- Dónal Lunny – bodhrán (on "Girseachaí an Phointe / Port Chití Rua")
- Michael McGoldrick – flute (on "Aige Bruach Dhún Réimhe"; "An Dro / Imeall"); uilleann pipes (on "Gardaí 'n Rí")
- Jim Higgins – percussion (on "A Óganaigh Óig"; "Gardaí 'n Rí"; "Highlands / Red Crow"; "Mo Níon Ó"; "Néillí Bhán"; "An Dro / Imeall"); bodhrán (on "Méillte Cheann Dubhráin / The Twenty One Highland / The Four Mile Stone"; "The Pigeon on the Gate / The Convenience / The Highlandman Who Kissed His Granny")
- Graham Henderson – keyboards (on "A Óganaigh Óig"; "Gardaí 'n Rí"; "Aige Bruach Dhún Réimhe"; "An Dro / Imeall"); bodhrán
- Annbjørg Lien – Hardanger fiddle (on "Mazurkas"; "Is Fada Ó Bhaile")
- Tim Edey – Guitar (on "An Fidleoir"; "Highlands / Red Crow"; "The Pigeon on the Gate / The Convenience / The Highlandman Who Kissed His Granny")

=== Production ===
- Manus Lunny – engineer
- Mairéad Ní Mhaonaig – producer
- Manus Lunny – producer
- Trond Engebresten – additional engineering (tracks 3 & 4)
- Ian McNulty – additional engineering
- O'Donnell – sleeve design, photography
- Colm Hogan – photography
- Anna Lethard – Nia photo
- Mairéad – Francie drawing

== Release history ==
Release date	Country
28 December 2008	Gaoth Dobhair (Gweedore), County Donegal, Ireland (only available during the Frankie Kennedy Winter Music School)
12 February 2009	Worldwide (general release)
