= Donegal (album) =

Studio album by Altan
- Released: 1 March 2024
- Recorded: Ceann Caslach (at Manus Lunny's studio, Stiuideo na Mara) Attica Studios (Donegal mountains)
- Genre: Celtic
- Length: 38:31
- Label: Compass Records

Altan chronology
The Gap of Dreams (2018)	Donegal (2024)

Donegal is the fourteenth studio album by Irish folk music group Altan and their thirteenth studio album of original material, released in March 2024 on the Compass Records label.

== Background ==
This was the first studio album of original material to be released by Altan in exactely six years, since the release of The Gap of Dreams in March 2018, the longest gap between two Altan's studio albums (and the second longest gap between two Altan's albums of original material, the first longest gap being between 2005's Local Ground and 2012's Gleann Nimhe – The Poison Glen). This is also the first Altan album to feature newcomer Clare Friel on fiddle, viola and vocals following its arrival in the band as a replacement of former band member Ciarán Tourish, at first as a guest musician for the Autumn 2022 and Spring 2023 US tours, then as a permanent member in July 2023.

Donegal captures the essence of the region that has inspired Altan from the very beginning. It is a tribute to the rich musical heritage of their native land. Mairéad Ní Mhaonaigh's ethereal vocals breathe life into songs like "Liostáil mé le Sáirsint" and "The Barley and the Rye." Alongside her, Clare Friel adds her own remarkable voice and fiery twin fiddle playing, infusing the tracks with an irresistible energy. The collaboration of Dáithí Sproule, Mark Kelly, and Ciarán Curran completes Altan's musical tribute. Special guests like Jim Higgins, Steve Cooney, and Graham Henderson enrich the album, adding layers of depth and texture to Altan's evocative sound. (Note: .The press kit aptly reads: Altan is arguably the most iconic band working in traditional Irish music today. For the past 35 years, they have been bringing the music of their native County Donegal to the world stage. Irish-language songs and dynamic twin-fiddling, the hallmarks of Altan's sound, framework the band's newest album, aptly titled Donegal. The album's 10 tracks pay homage to Donegal's rich musical heritage, breathtaking landscapes, and vibrant culture. The authenticity and allure of the music transports listeners to a bygone time in rural Ireland while simultaneously forging a connection between the past and modern times. Bandleader, lead vocalist and fiddler Mairéad Ní Mhaonaigh is in fine form, lending her angelic voice to "Liostáil mé le Sáirsint" and "The Barley and the Rye" and contributing "Port Árainn Mhór/Port Kitty Rua Mooney," an outstanding set of jigs, to the project. Altan's newest member, Clare Friel, shares vocal duties with Ní Mhaonaigh, most notably on the track "Faoiseamh a Geheobhadsa" and adds her fiery twin fiddle playing to great effect. Accordionist Martin Tourish brings his formidable chops and compositional sense to the medley "The House of Baoithín" which pays homage to the mid 6th century Saint Baoithín. Dáithí Sproule (guitar), Mark Kelly (guitar, harmony vocals) and Ciarán Curran (bouzouki, mandolin) round out the band which is augmented by special guests Jim Higgins (percussion), Steve Cooney (bass) and Graham Henderson (keyboards) on select tracks. Recorded by Manus Lunny at Stiúidió na Mara ("Seafront Studio") in County Donegal, Donegal captures the essence of the region which has inspired Altan since the band's inception and further cements Altan's legacy as one of the great cultural treasures of Ireland.)

== Recording ==
Donegal was recorded by Manus Lunny amidst the rugged beauty of County Donegal at Stiúideo na Mara (“Seafront Studio”), An Bhráid, Tír Chonaill, Na Rosa (The Rosses), County Donegal, Ireland.

== Critical reception ==
Professional ratings
Review scores
Source	Rating
FolkAlley.com	very favourable
NewReleasesNow.com	very favourable
FolkWorks.org	very favourable

Donegal received positive reviews from a number of magazines and websites.

Website FolkAlley.com's music critic Henry Carrigan gave the new album a warm review, stating: "Donegal captures the pensive, the melancholy, and the jubilant in Altan's exuberant jigs and reels and in their tender, evocative, and playful ballads and songs."

The music website NewReleasesNow.com also gave the new album a warm review, stating: "In traditional Irish music, Altan stands as a beacon of authenticity and brilliance, channeling the soul of their native County Donegal onto the global stage for over three decades. On their latest album, Donegal, Altan once again mesmerizes audiences with a heartfelt homage to their roots, celebrating the rich tapestry of Donegal's musical heritage, its stunning landscapes, and vibrant culture. Altan's unmistakable sound is beautifully encapsulated, weaving together Irish-language ballads and dynamic twin-fiddling that have become synonymous with the band. Through ten captivating tracks, listeners are transported to a bygone era in rural Ireland, where the music echoes the rhythm of life itself while seamlessly bridging the gap between past traditions and modern sensibilities. [...] With Donegal, Altan reaffirms their status as custodians of Ireland's cultural legacy, honoring the region's musical heritage while enchanting audiences around the globe with their timeless melodies and infectious rhythms."

Website FolkWorks.org's music critic Shea Gaier also gave the new album a warm review, stating: "I have been listening to Altan for a vast majority of my young life, and I’ve seen Altan evolve through the years. Their new album called Donegal reaches back into the past, emphasizes the present, and provides an excellent foundation for the future of the band. [...] This album may only have ten tracks but it certainly doesn’t disappoint. It is a jam packed album that shows Altan's connections to the past while bringing in a lot of newly written material. It shows how deeply they care about their roots, and how they bring the tradition into the future."

== Track listing ==
1. "The Yellow Tinker" (Slow Reel) – 3:03
2. "Liostáil mé le Sáirsint" (Song #1) – 3:11
3. "The Donegal Selection: An Bóthar Mór/Tommy Peoples' Reel/Is Cuma Liom" (Reels) – 3:24
4. "Faoiseamh a Gheobhadsa" (Song #2) – 5:18
5. "Port Árainn Mhór/Port Kitty Rua Mooney" (Jigs) – 3:30
6. "The House of Baoithín Selection: Miss Stewart's/Bonnie Annie/ Hand Me Down The Tea Things/House of Baoithín" (Reels) – 3:54
7. "The Barley And The Rye" (Song #3) – 3:18
8. "An Gasúr Dána/An Ghirseach Dholba/Ríl na mBreac Beadaí" (Reels) – 4:08
9. "Gabhaim Molta Bríde" (Song #4) – 4:29
10. "The Letterkenny Blacksmith/John Doherty's Favourite/Scread na Bealtaine" (Reels) – 4:16

== Personnel ==
- Mairéad Ní Mhaonaigh – Vocals/Fiddle
- Ciarán Curran – Bouzouki/Mandolin
- Dáithí Sproule – Guitar
- Mark Kelly – Guitar/Backing Vocals
- Martin Tourish – Accordion
- Clare Friel – Fiddle/Viola/Vocals

With

- Jim Higgins – Percussion (1, 10)
- Steve Cooney – Bass (1)
- Graham Henderson – Keyboards (1)

== Credits ==
- Recorded at Stiúideo na Mara (“Seafront Studio”), An Bhráid, Tír Chonaill, Na Rosa (The Rosses), County Donegal, Ireland, by Manus Lunny
- Additional Recording at 'The Villa', Savage, Minnesota, USA
- Mixed by Matt Coles at Compass Sound Studio, Nashville, Tennessee, USA
- Mastered by Randy LeRoy at Tonal Park, Tacoma Park, Maryland, USA
- Martin Tourish plays Martin Tourish Accordions by Bompezzo
- Mairéad Ní Mhaonaigh plays a Noel Burke Bow
- Cover art by Édaín O'Donnell
- Package design by Robert Hakalski | www.vmdigital.com
- Photography by Linda Cunningham
