= Old Hag You Have Killed Me =

Studio album by the Bothy Band
- Released: 1976
- Genre: Irish folk
- Label: Polydor
- Producers: Mícheál Ó Domhnaill, Dónal Lunny

The Bothy Band chronology
The Bothy Band (1975)	Old Hag You Have Killed Me (1976)	Out of the Wind – Into the Sun (1977)

Old Hag You Have Killed Me is the second album by the Irish band the Bothy Band, released in 1976. They supported it with a UK tour.

== Production ==
The album was produced by bandmembers Mícheál Ó Domhnaill and Dónal Lunny. The fiddler Kevin Burke replaced Tommy Peoples prior to the recording sessions. "Fionnghuala" is a vocal track, without instrumentation. Lunny played a bouzouki on some of the tracks. "Calum Sgaire" is a Caledonian song.

== Critical reception ==
Professional ratings
Review scores
Source	Rating
All Music Guide	5/5 stars
The Encyclopedia of Popular Music	4/5 stars
MusicHound Folk: The Essential Album Guide	5/5 stars

The Sunday Independent stated that the band had "found the key, moulded and cut by Planxty but since lost, to the proper studio setting for traditional music." The Ormskirk Advertiser said that "Tríona Ní Dhomhnaill's distinctive and attractive voice comes over well on the lively song '16 Come Next Sunday'." The Bracknell and Ascot Times praised the "extraordinary range of traditional Irish music [and] unparalleled vigour, passion and humour." The Evening Post called the album "a dazzling swirl of jigs, reels and airs counterbalanced by nostalgic, pastoral ballads".

In 1994, The Danville News labeled Old Hag You Have Killed Me "about the most important Celtic album of all time." In 2001, Goldmine called it "Irish folk at its finest". MusicHound Folk: The Essential Album Guide praised the "near perfect balance" of instrumentals and vocal tracks. Geoffrey Stokes, in The Village Voice, listed Old Hag You Have Killed Me as one of the 10 best albums of the 1970s.

== Track listing ==
Side 1

1. "Music in the Glen"
2. "Fionnghuala"
3. "The Kid on the Mountain"
4. "Farewell to Erin"
5. "Tiochfaidh An Samhradh (Summer Will Come)"
6. "The Laurel Tree"

Side 2

1. "16 Come Next Sunday"
2. "Old Hag You Have Killed Me"
3. "Calum Sgaire"
4. "The Ballintore Fancy"
5. "The Maid of Coolmore"
6. "Michael Gorman's"
