= Manus Lunny =

Irish producer (born 1962)

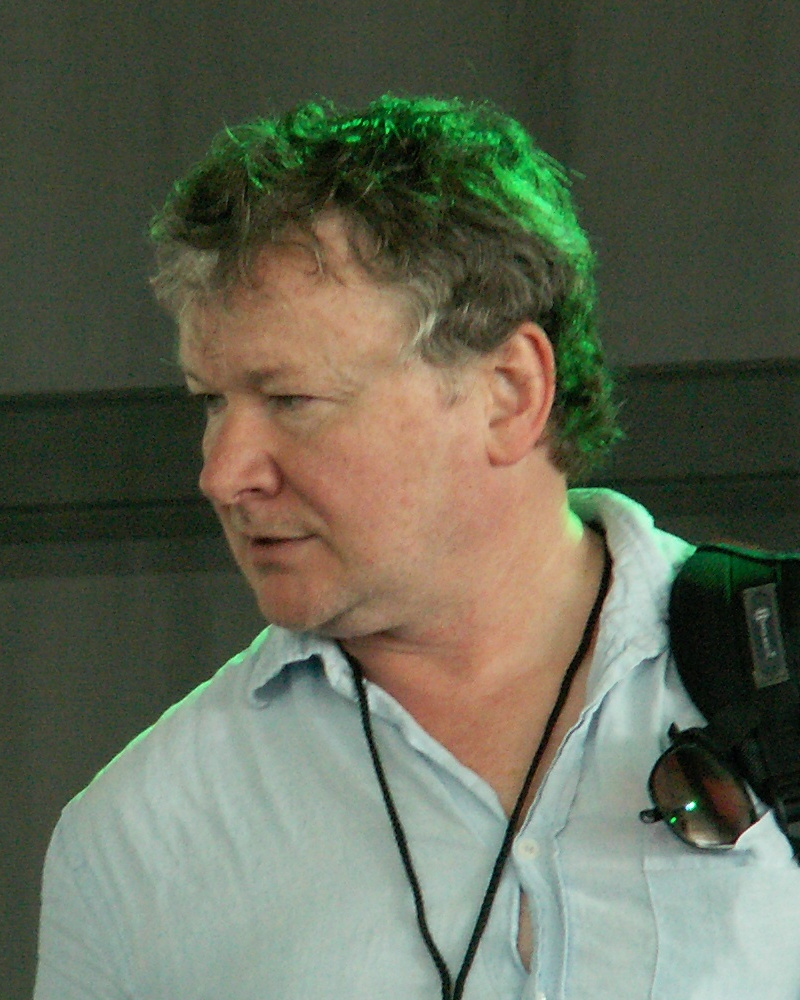
- Lunny in 2005

Background information
- Born: 1962 (age 63–64); Dublin, Ireland
- Origin: Gweedore, County Donegal, Ireland
- Genres: Celtic; Folk; Rock
- Occupations: Producer; Guitarist; Bouzouki player Singer
- Years active: c.1970 – present

Manus Lunny (born 1962) is an Irish producer and multi-instrumentalist from County Donegal, Ireland, best known as a member of Celtic supergroup Capercaillie. He is the brother of multi-instrumentalist and producer Dónal Lunny.

== Biography and career ==
Manus Lunny was born in Dublin and reared in Newbridge, County Kildare in a family which practised music regularly. He has been living in County Donegal for many years now, close to where his mother was born in Ranafast. He toured widely with Barry Moore (now Luka Bloom) as a teenager. He was a member of Scottish/Irish band The Wild Geese which toured Ireland and performed limited concerts in Britain. After the band took a break, Lunny began to tour with Phil Cunningham and future long-term collaborator Andy M. Stewart. They toured as a trio to begin with before branching out into other bands.

Manus is best known as a member of Celtic supergroup Capercaillie. He has composed music for the BBC and various American television broadcasters and was a prominent session musician on two of Ireland's most well known compilations, Éist and Ceol Tacsi.vision recordings.

In collaboration with Phil Cunningham, Lunny has written two pieces for the American record label Windham Hill.

Lunny's work as a recording engineer and producer also includes the album Imeall (2008), Altan's lead singer and fiddler Mairéad Ní Mhaonaigh's debut solo album and Na Mooneys (2016), the eponymous debut album by Mairéad Ní Mhaonaigh's family band called Na Mooneys.

After decades of gigging and recording, Lunny finally gotten around to making a CD of his own compositions titled The Glenveagh Suite. Actually, he received a commission from the National Parks and Wildlife Services to compose music for five short films about Glenveagh National Park, its history and its conservation initiatives in County Donegal. For the album, Lunny got some of his most favourite musicians to play and sing on it: Moya Brennan, Mairéad Ní Mhaonaigh, Neil Martin, Martin Crossin, Theresa Kavanagh, Donald Shaw, Ewen Vernal, Liam Bradley, Mary Crossin and Caitlin Nic Gabhann. Lunny had a gathering on 29 September 2018 (9pm) in Leo's Tavern in Meenaleck to mark the launch and also to play music for the occasion.

== Partial discography ==
=== Solo ===
- 2018 - The Glenveagh Suite

=== Lunny, Stewart, Cunningham ===
- 1990 – At It Again, Manus Lunny & Andy M. Stewart
- 1990 – Songs of Robert Burns, Andy M. Stewart (also produced)
- 1987 – Dublin Lady, Manus Lunny & Andy M. Stewart
- 1986 – Fire in the Glen, Manus Lunny, Phil Cunningham & Andy M. Stewart (also co-produced)

=== With Capercaillie ===
- See Capercaillie (since 1989)

=== With Na Mooneys ===
- "Soilse na Nollag" (4:26) (single released on 17 December 2017) by Na Mooneys and Manus Lunny (a Christmas Song or Carol, composed by Francie Mooney and Mairéad Ní Mhaonaigh (his daughter), made available to help raise funds for the St. Vincent de Paul Society who help people who are disadvantaged all year round, and whose help is especially needed by people at Christmas)

=== Other collaborations ===
- 2009 – T with the Maggies, T with the Maggies (musician and produced)
- 2009 – Ceol Cheann Dubhrann, Various (also produced, mixed, recorded and engineered)
- 2008 – Imeall, Mairéad Ní Mhaonaigh (also co-produced)
- 2006 – Loinneog Cheoil, Aoife (also produced and mixed)
- 2006 – Wired, Michael McGoldrick
- 2006 – Raining Up, Mairéad Nesbitt (also produced and mixed)
- 2006 – Draíocht, Dave Flynn (engineered and played bodhrán)
- 2005 – Earthsongs, Secret Garden
- 2004 – The Very Best of Celtic Christmas, Various artists
- 2003 – Celtic Twilight, Various artists
- 2003 – Celtic Compass, Various artists
- 2002 – At First Light, Michael McGoldrick & John McSherry
- 2001 – 25 Years of Celtic Music, Various artists
- 2001 – Journey: The Best Of, Dónal Lunny
- 2000 – A Thistle & Shamrock Christmas Ceilidh, Various artists
- 2000 – Song of the Green Linnet, Various artists
- 2000 – Fused, Michael McGoldrick
- 2000 – Celtic Woman Vol. 2, Various artists
- 2000 – Idir : Identités, Various artists
- 2000 – Gaelic Voices, Various artists
- 1999 – The Voice of Celtic Music, Various artists
- 1999 – Scotland Forever, Various artists
- 1999 – Myriad, Gerry O'Connor
- 1999 – For Love of Erin, Various artists
- 1999 – Legends of Scottish Fiddle, Various artists
- 1999 – Celtic Christmas, Various artists
- 1999 – Bretagnes a Bercy, Various artists
- 1998 – Joyful Noise: Celtic Favorites from Green Linnet, Various artists (also produced and arranged)
- 1998 – Celtic Reflections, Various artists
- 1998 – Celtic Christmas Vol. 4, Various artists
- 1998 – The Celts Rise Again, Celtophile (also produced)
- 1998 – Playing With Fire, Various artists
- 1998 – Her Infinite Variety: Celtic Women in Music & Song, Various artists
- 1997 – Celtic Love Songs, Celtophile (also produced)
- 1997 – Traditional Music of Scotland, Celtophile (also arranged and produced)
- 1997 – Celtic Music Today, Celtophile (also produced)
- 1997 – Scottish Voices, Various artists
- 1997 – There Was a Lady: The Voice of Celtic Women, Various artists
- 1997 – If Ever I Return, Connie Dover
- 1997 – The Dreaming Sea, Karen Matheson
- 1996 – Celtic Christmas, Vol. 2, Various artists
- 1996 – Green Linnet 20th Anniversary Collection, Various artists
- 1996 – Windham Hill Sampler '96, various artists
- 1995 – Celtic Christmas (Windham Hill), various artists
- 1995 – Celtic Graces: A Best of Ireland, various artists
- 1995 – Celtic Voices: Women of Song, various artists
- 1994 – The Best of Ireland, various artists
- 1994 – Wishing Well, Connie Dover
- 1992 – Heart of the Gaels, various artists (also produced)
- 1991 – Time to Time, Gerry O'Connor
- 1990 – Somebody, Connie Dover
- 1990 – The Celts Rise Again, Karen Matheson
- 1987 – Dónal Lunny, Dónal Lunny
- 1986 – Fiddler's Fancy: Fifty Irish Fiddle Tunes Collected and Performed by the Irish Fiddle Legend, Tommy Peoples

== See also ==
- Dónal Lunny
- Mairéad Ní Mhaonaigh
