= Ireland In Music (TV programme) =

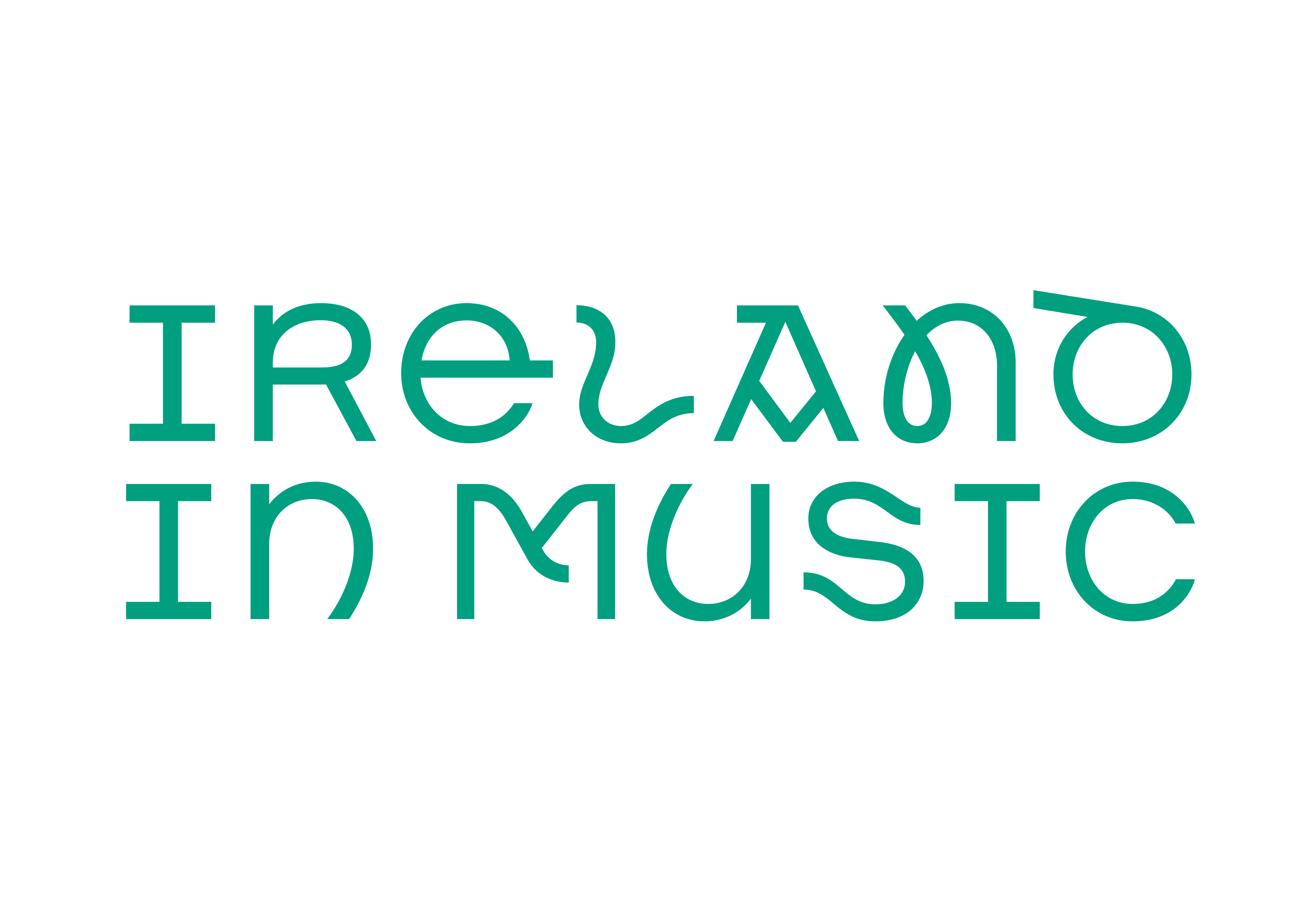
"Ireland In Music" logo

Ireland In Music is a television programme showcasing a mixture of traditional folk songs and original material by Irish musicians at notable locations around Ireland.

The programme has five seasons as of 2026.

== Background ==
Ireland In Music is produced by TradFest in association with Born Optimistic, The Temple Bar Company, RTÉ, the Department of Tourism, Culture, Arts, Gaeltacht, Sport and Media, Fáilte Ireland, Tourism Ireland and local authorities. It was conceived by director Donal Scannell of Born Optimistic and the team behind TradFest in mid-2020, with series one filmed during the early stages of Covid-19 lockdowns.

It was first broadcast on RTÉ One on 29 December 2020, and has been subsequently broadcast in 41 countries around the world.

== Locations ==
The work of the performers is accompanied by aerial footage of Ireland, such as in Temple Bar, Adare Manor, and Navan Fort.

== Reception ==
Writing in the Irish Examiner, Simon Price noted "the shift from live concerts to online streaming brought about by the pandemic has given audiences and artists an opportunity to enjoy high-quality original Irish music presented from national parks, stately homes, art galleries, iconic landmarks and other venues not ordinarily open to public performance...the crowning effort of this trend to date has been the production of Ireland In Music".

Niall Gibbons, Chief Executive of Tourism Ireland, said that his organisation was "delighted to support the Ireland in Music series - showcasing some of our emerging and well-known artists against the backdrop of our spectacular landscapes to a global audience"..
