= Proinsias Ó Maonaigh =

Irish fiddler (1922–2006)

- Proinsias Ó Maonaigh with his daughter Mairéad in 2002

Background information
- Born: Proinsias Ó Maonaigh; 28 April 1922; Gweedore, County Donegal, Ireland
- Died: 28 March 2006 (aged 83) Gaoth Dobhair, County Donegal, Ireland
- Genres: Irish traditional
- Occupations: Musician, teacher

Proinsias Ó Maonaigh (Irish pronunciation: [ˈpˠɾˠɪn̠ʲʃiəsˠ oː ˈmˠiːn̪ˠiː]) or Francie Mooney (28 April 1922 – 28 March 2006) was a fiddler from Gweedore (Gaoth Dobhair), County Donegal, Ireland. He is known for his distinguished fiddle playing and his unique and vast contribution to Irish music and culture. He is the father of Mairéad Ní Mhaonaigh (fiddle player, lead vocalist and cofounder of Irish folk music band Altan) and grandfather of fiddle player Ciarán Ó Maonaigh.

== Early life ==
Born in Gaoth Dobhair in 1922 as the youngest of eight children, he was a son of a famous musician from the area Róise Mhór who would have played with An Píobaire Mór ("The Great Piper") Tarlach Mac Suibhne. It was an Irish speaking household and traditional music was nurtured within the home and they were taught many Irish songs.

== Life and career ==
In 1954, he married a Gaoth Dobhair woman, Kitty Ní Ghallchóir, and they have three children: Gearóid Ó Maonaigh, Mairéad Ní Mhaonaigh and Áine Ní Mhaonaigh (or Anna Mooney). Francie is also the grandfather of fiddle player Ciarán Ó Maonaigh.

He taught at Luinneach primary school in Gaoth Dobhair from 1967 until his retirement in 1996. He also taught many locals how to play the fiddle up to the age of 82.

Francie was also a keen Gaelic footballer and contributed greatly to the local and county GAA.

He is credited for such works as "Francie Mooney's German", "Francie Mooney's Mazourka" and "Francie Mooney's Highland".

His most famous song was written about his hometown Gaoth Dobhair, called "Gleanntáin Ghlas' Ghaoth Dobhair". It has been performed by bands and singers such as Altan, Paul Brady, Brian Kennedy and Clannad. Altan's version of the song appears on their 1997 album Runaway Sunday. Scottish folk group Battlefield Band popularised the song as "Paddy's Green Shamrock Shore" (which they recorded and released in 1976 on their debut album Farewell to Nova Scotia).

He also wrote pantomimes for the local theater, and translated many songs from English into Irish.

In 2003, he was honoured by the Oireachtas when he was the president of the Letterkenny event.

Proinsías Ó Maonaigh died on 28 March 2006, after a brief illness. His funeral was one of the biggest ever seen in County Donegal, and acts such as Skara Brae, Altan, Paul Brady and Clannad paid tribute to him at the requiem mass in Gaoth Dobhair.

On 22 November 2007, a concert honouring him was held at the opening of the new theatre in Dunlewey. The tribute was conducted entirely in Irish, and included both instrumentals and songs he had composed or translated, plus some of his own favorites. There were several instrumental sets, a comic performance, and some dancing. The chorus consisted of over 20 members (many of them family) and almost a dozen musicians.

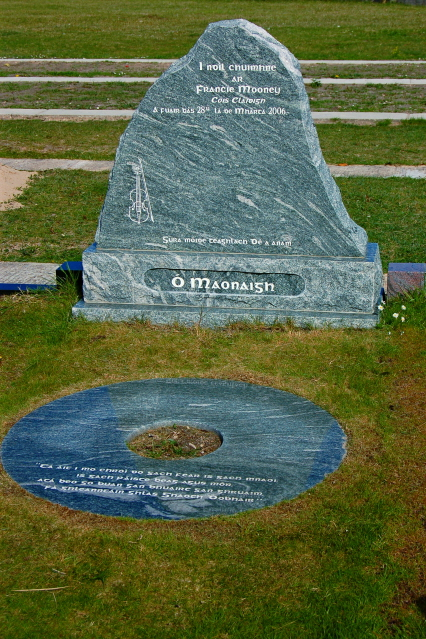
Francie's grave at Machaire Gathlán Cemetery in Gweedore, County Donegal.

== His legacy ==
Francie was instrumental in the success of local musicians such as Enya, Clannad and Skara Brae.

Francie's daughter, lead singer and fiddle player Mairéad Ní Mhaonaigh is the lead and founding member of internationally recognised Irish folk music group Altan. Mairéad Ní Mhaonaigh's début solo album, Imeall (2009) features a piece of music which she composed in memory of her father entitled "An Fidleoir" (The Fiddler).

Francie's son and guitar player Gearóid Ó Maonaigh is also well known locally for his musical talents, as well as his love of Irish traditional music.

Gearóid and other family members, such as Anna Mooney (or Anna Ní Mhaonaigh or Áine Ní Mhaonaigh), are also heavily involved in organizing musical events locally such as the world-famous Scoil Gheimhridh Frankie Kennedy.

Francie's grandson and fiddle player Ciarán Ó Maonaigh is the recipient of the 2003 TG4 Musician of the Year Award. In the mid 2000s, Ciarán Ó Maonaigh formed the duo Caitlín & Ciarán with concertina player, traditional dancer and spouse Caitlín Nic Gabhann. The duo released their debut (eponymous) studio album entitled Caitlín & Ciarán on 14 April 2015.

In late 2013 / early 2014, Mairéad Ní Mhaonaigh, her siblings Anna Ní Mhaonaigh (whistle) and Gearóid Ó Maonaigh (guitar), and her nephew Ciarán Ó Maonaigh (fiddle & bouzouki) formed the Irish folk music band Na Mooneys on the occasion of the very last Frankie Kennedy Winter School which occurred in Gweedore, County Donegal, Ireland (Note: The last Frankie Kennedy Winter School occurred in late December 2013 / early January 2014.) where they performed their first ever show. Na Mooneys released their debut (eponymous) studio album Na Mooneys on 6 October 2016.

In the late 2010s, fiddle player Ciarán Ó Maonaigh formed the trio CCC (Note: ... as depicted on the trio's The High Seas debut album cover.) with concertina player, traditional dancer and spouse Caitlín Nic Gabhann, and fiddle & bouzouki player and lead singer Cathal Ó Curráin. CCC released their debut studio album entitled The High Seas on 19 May 2018. Actually, the trio CCC rather goes by the name of its debut album i.e. The High Seas.
