= Plates Coutures =

Studio album by Matmatah
- Released: 3 March 2017
- Recorded: August 2016
- Venue: Brussels, Belgium
- Studio: ICP Studios, Abbey Road Studios
- Genre: French rock
- Length: 44:22
- Language: French and English
- Label: La Ouache Production
- Producer: Matmatah & Bruno Green

Matmatah chronology
Antaology (2015)	Plates Coutures (2017)	Miscellanées Bissextiles (2023)

Plates Coutures ("Flat Sewings", defeated) is the fifth studio album by French rock band Matmatah. It was released in France on 3 March 2017. Marrée Haute ("High Tide") is the first extract of the eleven new songs. The album was released after a 9-year absence.

== Conception ==
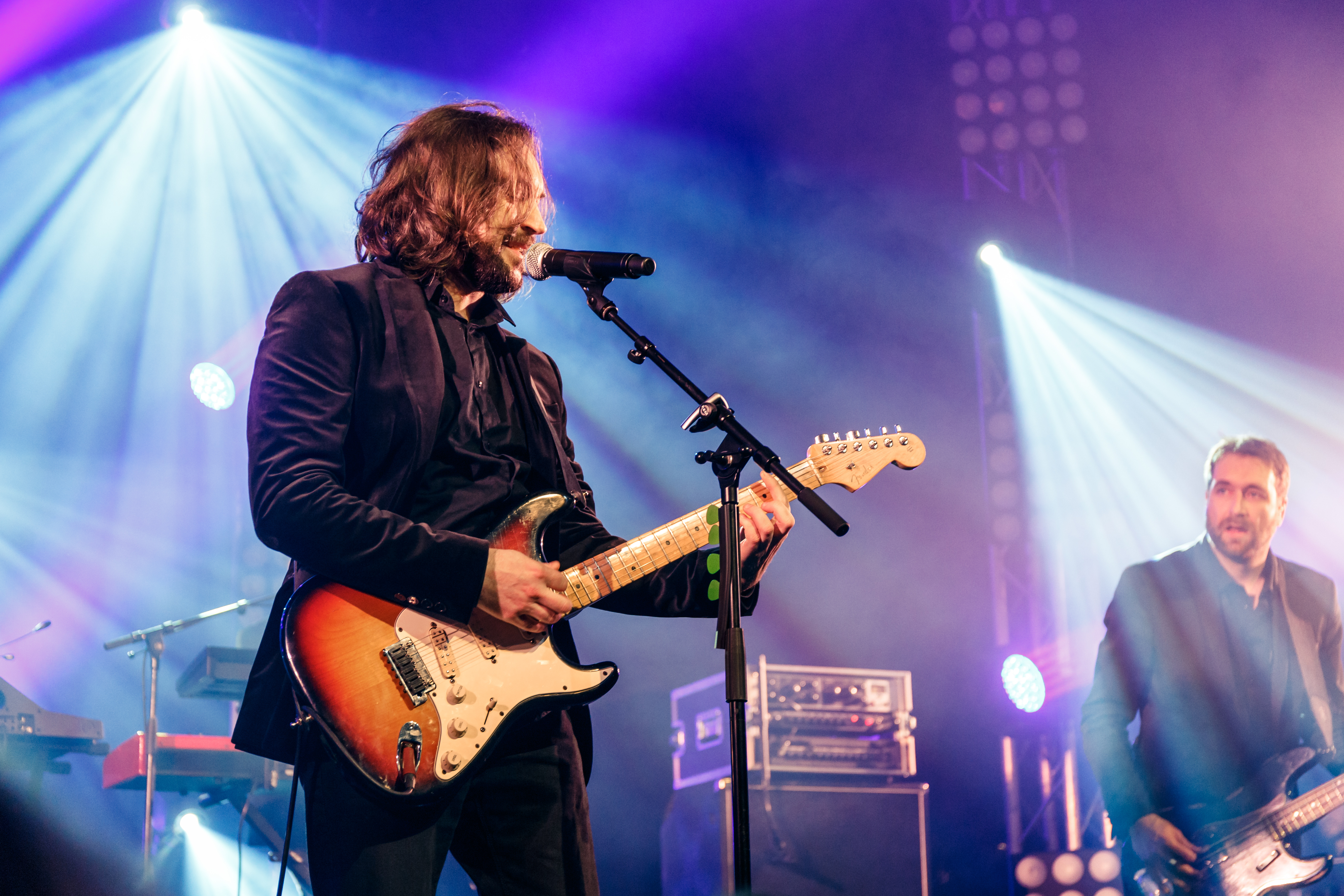
Tristan Nihouarn and Éric Digaire back on stage in February 2017.

The album's recording began in secret as the members began working on the project one year before announcing the group's reformation. A new guitarist joined the band, Emmanuel Baroux, who collaborated with Axel Bauer and Astonvilla.

Matmatah traveled to West Yorkshire, England to begin recording in August 2016. Guitarist Bruno Green (Detroit) was in charge of production. In October, the songs were mixed at ICP studios in Brussels. Mastering took place at Abbey Road Studios in London.

== Track listing ==
All tracks are written by Tristan Nihouarn

No.	Title	Length
1.	"Nous y sommes"	4:17
2.	"Lésine pas"	2:52
3.	"Petite frappe"	4:15
4.	"Marée haute"	4:08
5.	"Toboggan"	6:11
6.	"Retour à la normale"	3:11
7.	"Ô ma beauté"	4:18
8.	"Entre en lignes"	4:15
9.	"Overcom"	3:19
10.	"Margipop"	3:11
11.	"Peshmerga"	4:18

== Personnel ==
=== Design ===
- Emmanuel Baroux – guitars, keyboards, vocals
- Éric Digaire – bass, guitars, keyboards, percussions, vocals
- Benoît Fournier – drums, percussion, guitars, piano
- Tristan Nihouarn – guitars, keyboards, harmonica, percussion, flute, vocals
- Bruno Green – keyboards, guitars, percussions

=== Additional musicians ===
- Gaëlle Kerrien – choirs (2, 11)
- Gaëlle Bellaunay – choirs (2)
- Morgane Mercier – choirs director (11), choirs (2, 11)
- Ghislaine Bachelier, Odile Guillarmou, Nadia Le Goff, Grand Palladium – choirs (11)
- Dana Colley – bass clarinet, saxophones (baritone, tenor and viola), flute, voice (5)
- Sebastien Blanchon – trumpet (4, 6)
- David Dupuis – trombone (6)
- Jacopo Costa: cimbalum (4, 9)

== Charts ==
Chart (2017)	Peak position
Belgian Albums (Ultratop Wallonia)	49
French Albums (SNEP)	22
