= The Gap of Dreams =

Studio album by Altan
- Released: 2 March 2018
- Recorded: November 2017
- Studios: Attica Studios, Drumdeevin, Termon, Letterkenny, County Donegal, Ireland
- Genre: Celtic
- Length: 58:49
- Label: Compass Records
- Producers: Garry West and Altan

Altan chronology
The Widening Gyre (2015)	The Gap of Dreams (2018)	Donegal (2024)

The Gap of Dreams is the thirteenth studio album by Irish folk music group Altan and their twelfth studio album of original material, released in March 2018 on the Compass Records label to critical acclaim.

== Background ==
This is the first studio album of original material to be released by Altan in three years, since the release of The Widening Gyre in February 2015. This is also the first Altan album not to feature former band member Ciaran Tourish (usually on fiddle and flute) since he departed from the band in late July 2017.

As Altan states through their official website: "the album title is borrowed from The Ballad of Douglas Bridge, a poem by Francis Carlin (Note: Francis Carlin (1882–1945)), in which he writes: 'The Gap of Dreams is never shut', referring to the gap between this world and the Otherworld. The Otherworld has always exerted a large influence on the fiddling tradition of County Donegal and has served as inspiration for song, music and folklore."

== Recording ==
Altan recorded the new album during November 2017 "in the hills of Donegal", more precisely in Attica Studios, Drumdeevin, Termon, Letterkenny, County Donegal, Ireland.

The album features many sets of traditional Donegal reels such as Néilidh Boyle's composition, "Seán sa Cheo" ("John in the Mist"), as well as original compositions. Four of the songs are in Irish (Gaelic), which is Mairéad's first language, and the language of the northwest of Donegal.

About Altan's new musical direction, The Irish Times's music critic Siobhan Long stated: "It's fitting that Altan's first album in three years [...] should feature new tunes from the next generation – from Ní Mhaonaigh's daughter Nia [Byrne] (fiddle) and guitarist Mark Kelly's son Sam [Kelly] (concertina). These, alongside a pair of reels composed by Altan's most recent arrival, Martin Tourish on piano accordion, signal the band's appetite for evolution of the musical and familial kind."

Singer and founding member Mairéad Ní Mhaonaigh's daughter Nia Byrne contributed writing credits for "Nia's Jig", and played fiddle to accompany. Member Mark Kelly's (guitar and backing vocals) son wrote another single, "The Beekeeper", and played concertina on the single. Other recording members of Altan are Dáithí Sproule (guitar and vocals), Ciarán Curran (bouzouki) and Martin Tourish (piano accordion).

Altan called on Pledge Music's services to finance the new studio album.

== Critical reception ==
Professional ratings
Review scores
Source	Rating
The Irish Times	4/5 stars
Hot Press	8.5/10

The Gap of Dreams received positive reviews from a number of magazines and websites.

It received a warm review and 4 stars (out of 5) on 9 March 2018 from The Irish Times's music critic Siobhan Long, stating: "[Altan's] duelling fiddle sound is no longer a feature since Ciarán Tourish's departure, but The Gap of Dreams is a beautifully realised collection of new and traditional tunes rooted in their home place of Donegal. Ní Mhaonaigh contributes two gorgeous tunes of her own (including the evocative title tune) and her voice tends her pitch-perfect song choices with customary care, particularly on the beautiful "Cumha an Oileáin". The sense of internal refinement in the tune arrangements is heightened by the thoughtful contributions of bouzouki player Ciarán Curran and guitarists Mark Kelly and Dáithí Sproule. Unhurried and richly stitched, with arrangements that let the music shimmer, Altan are back – with gusto."

Hot Press's music critic Jackie Hayden gave the new album a rating of 8.5 points out of 10 and a warm review, stating: "This is Altan's 16th album [sic] since their formation in 1987, and their first studio effort since 2015's The Widening Gyre. Throughout their career, the Donegal act have displayed an impressive level of musical inventiveness. With The Gap Of Dreams, though, they've dug deeper, fashioning an album that reeks of history and of simpler times, when music and dancing were the glue that held rural communities together; real (and reel) channels of respite from hard living. Ní Mhaonaigh's vocals are as beguiling as ever, particularly on the wistful "The Month Of January", while "Cumha an Oileáin" is a timely reminder of the beauty of the Irish language, and "An Bealach Seo 'Tá Romham" boasts a welcome appearance by Moya Brennan. Ciarán Curran's bouzouki and the guitars of Dáithí Sproule and Mark Kelly add to the eclectic musical palette, with the production by Michael Kenney and Tommy McLaughlin also top-notch. It all makes for an uplifting musical experience."

The Living Tradition's music critic Alex Monaghan stated that despite "a few line-up changes since [he] last reviewed an Altan album—most notably the replacement of Dermot Byrne by Martin Tourish on accordion, and the departure of founder member Ciaran Tourish on fiddle which does leave the instrumentals weaker—Donegal's premier traditional band is still going strong [as] the basic formula still works: tunes and songs with a strong Donegal flavour, a mix of old and new, with a contemporary acoustic edge to the arrangements.» Monaghan enjoyed the new album, in particular tracks such as "Cumha An Oileáin", «sweetly sung despite the sad words, and set to a beautiful tune [...] or « the chilling "Month Of January" [which] sends a shiver down [his] spine,» adding that «[his] favourite track is a medley [track #10] which expresses the music of Donegal as performed by Altan since their inception, with fiddle and bouzouki, a clear full sound ending with "The Mermaid Of Mullaghmore" which would be at home on any Altan album since the original [1983] Ceol Aduaidh back in the mists of time."

== Track by track review and notes ==
Sources

- track #1: Mairéad Ní Mhaonaigh has composed the slip jig "The Gap of Dreams" which is followed by two original melodic jigs composed by the two guest musicians:
  - "Nia's Jig" by Nia Byrne; she also plays fiddle on the track.
  - "The Beekeeper" by Sam Kelly (logically named because it's in the key of B!); he also plays concertina on the track.
- track #2: «the chilling [song] "The Month of January" sends a shiver down [one's] spine, as much for the purity of the singing as for the cold-blooded story.»
- track #3: this elegant take on old reel "Seán sa Cheo" (a provocative composition which translates to «John in the Mist») is attributed to Néilidh Boyle (died 1961) while accordionist Martin Tourish wrote—in the Donegal style—the two lively reels that follow:
  - "Tuar" (which translates to «omen or sign») and
  - "Oíche Fheidhmiúil" (meaning «a spirited night»).
- track #5: this piping classic "The South West Wind" is particularly highlighted by Ciarán Curran's bouzouki setting.
- track #7: the «fine fiddle rendition of "The Cameronian" [is one of] the instrumental highlights» of the album.
- track #8: this song "An Bealach Seo 'Tá Romham (This Road Ahead of Me)" was written by Moya Brennan from Clannad fame: it dates back to 1975.
- track #9: "Dark Inishowen" is «no more cheerful» a song than "The Month of January".
- track #10: this medley «expresses the music of Donegal as performed by Altan since their inception, with fiddle and bouzouki, a clear full sound ending with "The Mermaid Of Mullaghmore" which would be at home on any Altan album...»
- track #11: "Cumha an Oileáin" is a song «sweetly sung despite the sad words, and set to a beautiful tune.»
- track #12: "Port Alex" is a tune by Mark Kelly which «celebrates another youngster's birth and showcases his own deft playing.»
- track #13: a song newly composed by Pádraigín Ní Uallacháin, «the final "Fare Thee Well, A Stór" could hardly fail to charm, being set to Shetland fiddle icon Tom Anderson's wonderful slow air, "Da Slockit Light", answering the prayers of all the singers who wished they could perform this melody.»

== Track listing ==
Durations source

1. "The Gap of Dreams / Nia's Jig / The Beekeeper" – 5:20
2. "The Month of January" – 5:45
3. "Seán sa Cheo / Tuar / Oíche Fheidhmiúil (A Spirited Night)" – 3:54
4. "Bacach Shíl Andaí" – 4:23
5. "The Piper in the Cave / An Ghaoth Aniar Aneas (The South-West Wind)" – 5:02
6. "Níon a' Bhaoigheallaigh" – 6:16
7. "The Tullaghan Lasses / The Cameronian / The Pigeon on the Gate" – 3:57
8. "An Bealach Seo 'Tá Romham (This Road Ahead of Me)" – 3:31
9. "Dark Inishowen" – 5:21
10. "The Templehouse Strathspey & Reel / John Mhosey McGinley's / The Mermaid of Mullaghmore" – 4:14
11. "Cumha an Oileáin" – 4:19
12. "Port Alex" – 2:22
13. "Fare Thee Well, A Stór" – 4:25

== Personnel ==
Altan

- Mairéad Ní Mhaonaigh – fiddle, vocals
- Martin Tourish – accordion
- Ciarán Curran – bouzouki, mandolin
- Mark Kelly – guitar, bouzouki, backing vocals
- Dáithí Sproule – guitar, backing vocals

Guest musicians

- Nia Byrne (Mairead's—then—14-year-old daughter) on fiddle
- Sam Kelly (Mark's—then—18-year-old son) on concertina.

Production

- Produced by Michael Keeney, Tommy McLaughlin and Altan
