= Scartaglen (Celtic group) =

Scartaglen was a Kansas City-based Celtic music group that formed in the summer of 1982. They produced three albums before disbanding in the spring of 1994.

The group was composed of co-founder Roger Landes (bouzouki, mandolin, tenor banjo, guitar and bodhran), Connie Dover (vocals and keyboard), co-founder Michael Dugger (guitar, tenor banjo, fiddle, vocals), Kirk Lynch (uilleann pipes, flute, tin whistle, guitar and bouzouki). Earlier line-ups included co-founder David Agee (fiddle, mandolin, tenor banjo, bones and vocals), Kathy Agee (keyboards, flute, tin whistle and vocals), Matthew Kirby (hammer dulcimer), Frank Martin (flute and tin whistle), Dave Brown (bodhran), Keith Van Winkle (fiddle) and Rebecca Pringle (fiddle). Not all of the musicians were in the band simultaneously, but each contributed from around 1982 until the band dissolved over twelve years later. Original tunes were contributed by Landes, Lynch, Dover, Kirby, and Dugger.

== Discography ==
- Scartaglen, Kicking Mule Records (1984) (produced by Brian McNeil of Scotland's Battlefield Band) - on LP and cassette
- The Middle Path, Castle Island Records (1986) - on LP and cassette
- Last Night's Fun, City Spark Records (1992) - on CD and cassette
- Chuaigh me 'na Rossan, on Celtic Odyssey, Narada Records (1993) on CD
