= Rebelote =

Studio album by Matmatah
- Released: 2001
- Genre: Rock
- Label: EMI

Matmatah chronology
La Ouache (1998)	Rebelote (2001)	Archie Kramer (2006)

Rebelote is the second studio album by the French rock band Matmatah. In this album, Matmatah largely abandoned Celtic rock and references to their hometown of Brittany in favor of traditional rock music. The album sold over 200,000 copies.

== Track listing ==
1. Boeing Down 2:36
2. Quelques sourires 3:30
3. Archimède 4:24
4. Petite Mort 4:29
5. Sushi Bar 2:32
6. The Grave Digger 3:42
7. Y'a de la place 3:06
8. Tricard Twins 3:57
9. Crève les yeux 4:05
10. Abonné absent 3:55
11. Out 9:09

== Personnel ==
- Tristan Nihouarn - guitar, vocals
- Éric Digaire - bass, vocals
- Cédric Floc'h - guitar, vocals
- Jean-François Paillard - drums
- Jesus Presley - production
- DJ Pone - featured on "Abonné absent" and "Quelques sourires"

(Track listing acquired from Amazon.com's listings and )
