= Na Mooneys =

Irish folk music band

- Origin: Gweedore, County Donegal, Ireland
- Genres: Traditional Irish; Folk; Celtic
- Years active: 2013 – present
- Members: Mairéad Ní Mhaonaigh; Gearóid Ó Maonaigh; Anna Ní Mhaonaigh; Ciarán Ó Maonaigh
- Website: www.facebook.com/NaMooneys

Na Mooneys (The Mooneys in Irish Gaelic) are an Irish folk music band from County Donegal, formed in late 2013 / early 2014 by Altan's Mairéad Ní Mhaonaigh and her family.

== History ==
Na Mooneys was formed in late 2013 / early 2014 by Mairéad Ní Mhaonaigh (from Irish folk music band Altan) and her siblings Anna Ní Mhaonaigh and Gearóid Ó Maonaigh along with Mairéad Ní Mhaonaigh's nephew, Ciarán Ó Maonaigh, on the occasion of the very last Frankie Kennedy Winter School which occurred in Gweedore, County Donegal, Ireland (Note: The last Frankie Kennedy Winter School occurred in late December 2013 / early January 2014.) where they performed their first ever show.

On their Facebook page (created on 7 January 2016), the band describe themselves as «a family of musicians & singers from the Donegal Gaeltacht» playing Irish traditional music.

The band Na Mooneys recorded their debut (eponymous) album Na Mooneys in early 2016 in Manus Lunny's studios in County Donegal, Ireland. The album was released on 6 October 2016.

== Live shows ==
- In late 2013 / early 2014 at the very last Frankie Kennedy Winter School in Gweedore, County Donegal, Ireland. (= Na Mooneys' first ever show)
- On 4 June 2016 at the "Féile Ceoil" event ("music festival" in Irish gaelic) in Gweedore, County Donegal, Ireland.
- On 12 July 2016 at the Ionad Cois Locha, Dún Lúiche, Ireland, during the Trad Trathnona ("Trad Afternoon"), County Donegal's Summer of traditional Sessions.
- On 8 October 2016 at the Glenties Fiddle concert 2016 in Highlands Hotel, Glenties, County Donegal, Ireland. (= Na Mooneys' first album supporting show)
- On 27 January 2017 during the Letterkenny Trad Week, County Donegal, Ireland.
- On 29 January 2017 at St. Michan's Church during the Temple Bar TradFest, Dublin, Ireland. (= Na Mooneys' Dublin debut show)
- On 19 October 2021 at the Abbey Arts Centre, Ballyshannon, Ireland during the Abbey Sessions (8 p.m. - 8€)

== Band members ==
- Mairéad Ní Mhaonaigh – fiddle and song
- Gearóid Ó Maonaigh – guitar
- Anna Ní Mhaonaigh – whistle and song
- Ciarán Ó Maonaigh – fiddle and octave fiddle

== Discography ==
=== Albums ===
- Na Mooneys (2016)

=== Singles ===
- "Soilse na Nollag" (4:26) (single by Na Mooneys and Manus Lunny, released on 17 December 2017) (Note: "Soilse na Nollag" is a Christmas Song (or Carol), composed by Francie Mooney and (his daughter) Mairéad Ní Mhaonaigh, made available to help raise funds for the St. Vincent de Paul Society who help people who are disadvantaged all year round, and whose help is especially needed by people at Christmas.)
