= T with the Maggies (album) =

Studio album by T with the Maggies
- Released: 29 October 2010
- Recorded: June – September 2010; Stiúidió na Mara (An Bhráid, County Donegal)
- Genre: Celtic, folk, Irish traditional
- Length: 43:47
- Language: Irish, English
- Label: TWM Music; Compass Records (United States)
- Producer: T with the Maggies, Manus Lunny

T with the Maggies chronology
T with the Maggies	Incumbent

Moya Brennan chronology
My Match Is A Makin' (2010)	T with the Maggies (2010)	Voices & Harps (2011)

Mairéad Ní Mhaonaigh chronology
Imeall (2009)	T with the Maggies (2010)

Maighread Ní Dhomhnaill chronology
Idir an Dá Sholas (1999)	T with the Maggies (2010)

Tríona Ní Dhomhnaill chronology
The Key's Within (2010)	T with the Maggies (2010)

Professional ratings
Review scores
Source	Rating
Hot Press	4.5/5 stars
Irish Times	3/4 stars
Irish News	4.5/5 stars
Irish Music Magazine	(favourable)

T with the Maggies is the debut album from Irish Celtic-folk supergroup T with the Maggies. It was released on 29 October 2010 in Ireland and on 22 February 2011 in the United States.

== Background ==
T with the Maggies, a group of individual international singers came together in 2007 to celebrate the life and music of Mícheál Ó Domhnaill, Triona and Maighread's older brother. The members, good friends for four decades, began touring together and started recording in July 2009. They began recording the album in An Bhráid, County Donegal in 2010.

== Development ==
The band travelled to the Tyrone Guthrie Centre creative retreat in Annaghmakerrig, County Monaghan to come up with a sound different form their past projects and solo albums. There they met American artist Megan Marlatt, who would later send them a picture of similar-looking puppets that would become the album's front cover image.

On 15 June 2010, Mairéad wrote the song Domhnach na Fola (English: Bloody Sunday), a few hours after the findings of the Saville Inquiry were read live on television around the world by British Prime Minister David Cameron. The music was co-written with fellow band-member Tríona Ní Dhomhnaill. Other songs written on the retreat were Ógánaigh Uasail and Mother's Song. They also arranged their own version of Richard Thompson's Farewell, Farewell.

== Track listing ==
No.	Title	Writer(s)	Length
1.	"Wedding Dress"	Traditional, arranged by T with the Maggies	4:36
2.	"Domhnach na Fola"	words: Mairéad Ní Mhaonaigh; music: Ní Mhaonaigh, Tríona Ní Dhomhnaill	3:19
3.	"Thugamar Fhéin an Samhradh Linn"	Traditional; arranged by T with the Maggies	3:52
4.	"Bíodh Orm Anocht"	Traditional; arranged by T with the Maggies	3:33
5.	"Mother's Song"	Music & words T with the Maggies	3:41
6.	"Ógánaigh Uasail"	words: Maighread Ní Dhomhnaill; music Traditional; arranged by T with the Maggies	5:00
7.	"Cuach Mo Londubh Buí"	Traditional; arranged by T with the Maggies	2:57
8.	"Ceol An Phíobaire"	Traditional; arranged by T with the Maggies	5:52
9.	"A Stór A Stór A Ghrá"	Traditional; arranged by T with the Maggies	2:39
10.	"Farewell, Farewell"	Richard Thompson; arranged by T with the Maggies	3:30
11.	"An Mhaighdeán Mhara"	Traditional; arranged by T with the Maggies	4:44

== About the tracks ==
- "Cuach Mo Londubh Buí" – Altan previously recorded and released this track as "Cuach Mo Lon Dubh Buí" (3:02) on their (studio) album The Blue Idol (2002).
- "Ceol An Phíobaire" – Frankie Kennedy and Mairéad Ní Mhaonaigh previously recorded and released this track as "Ceol A'Phíobaire" (3:50) on their second (studio) album Altan (1987).
- "A Stór A Stór A Ghrá" – Altan previously recorded and released this track as "Stór, A Stór, A Ghrá" (2:51) on their (studio) album Blackwater (1996).
- "An Mhaighdeán Mhara" – Altan previously recorded and released this track as "An Mhaighdean Mhara" (2:52) on their (studio) album Island Angel (1993).

== Release ==
The album was launched in Dublin on 29 October 2010 by actor Stephen Rea. Friends of the singers in attendance included musicians Luka Bloom, Neil Martin and Paul Brady and broadcaster Miriam O'Callaghan. On 6 November 2010, T with the Maggies held a special launch in Leo's Tavern (owned by Moya's father), Gaoth Dobhair in County Donegal.

=== Release history ===
Country	Release date	Label
Ireland	October 29, 2010	TWM Music
Worldwide (digital)	November 12, 2010	
United States	February 22, 2011	Compass Records

=== Promotion ===
T with the Maggies appeared on RTÉ's The Late Late Show October 29, performing the song Wedding Dress from the album. On 6 November 2010, they held a CD signing in Celtic Note, Dublin.

== Personnel ==
=== The band ===
- T with the Maggies - producers, arrangers, writers
- Maighread Ní Dhomhnaill - Vocals, yardstick
- Tríona Ní Dhomhnaill - Vocals, Piano, Keyboards, Accordion, Whistle
- Mairéad Ní Mhaonaigh - Vocals, Fiddle, Hardanger Fiddle, Low Octave Fiddle, Handwritten Script (artwork)
- Moya Brennan - Vocals, Harp, Djembe

=== Additional credits ===
- Manus Lunny - Co-producer, mixer, engineering Guitar, Bouzouki, Programming
- Jim Higgins - Additional Percussion
- Tim Jarvis - Cover Design, Photography
- Megan Marlatt - Cover Concept, Photography
- Mella Travers - photography
- Richard Robinson - photography
