= Matmatah =

French rock band

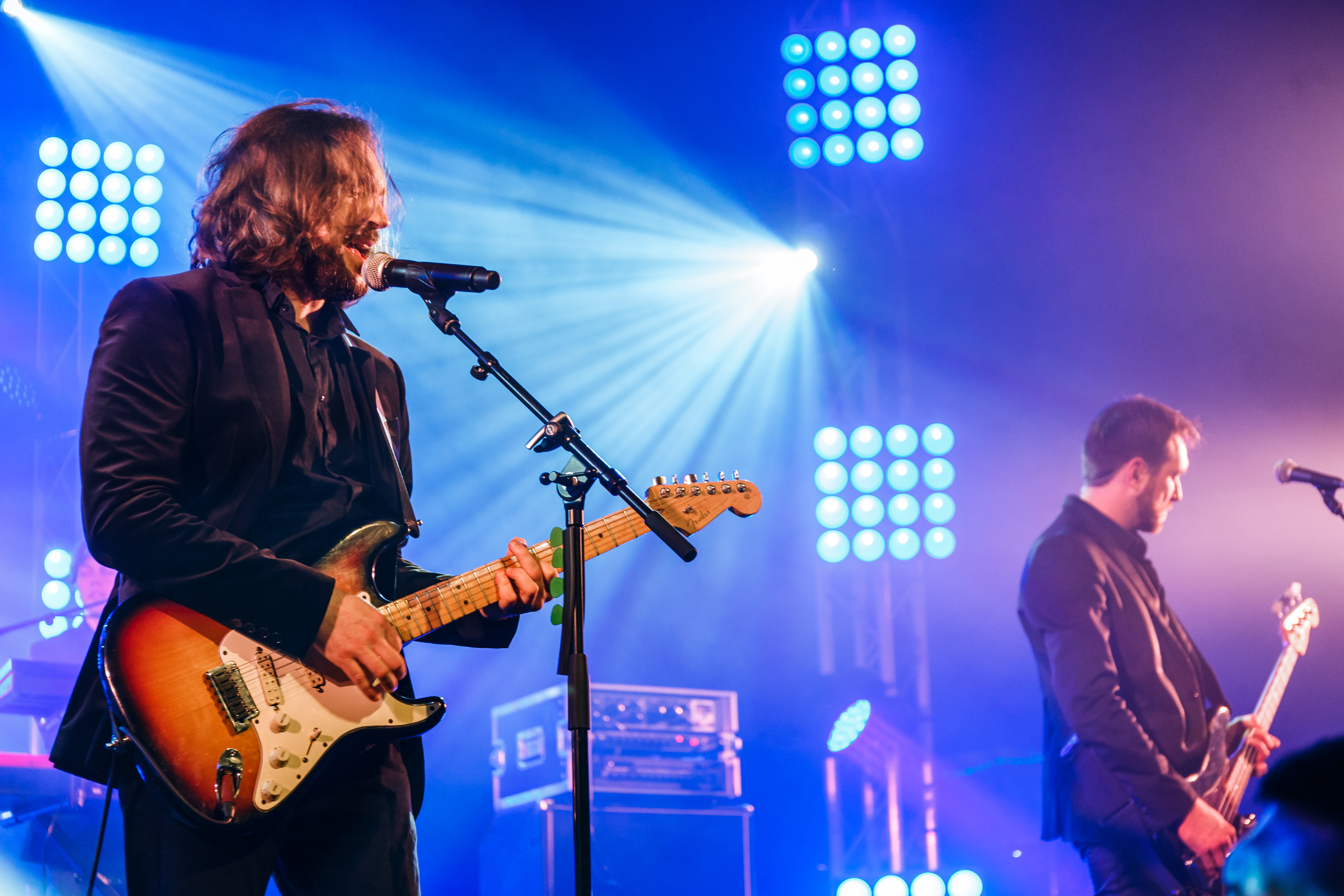
Matmatah in 2017

Matmatah is a French rock band, established in 1995 in Brest, Brittany, originally composed of Tristan Nihouarn, Éric Digaire, Jean-François Paillard and Cédric Floc'h.

== History ==
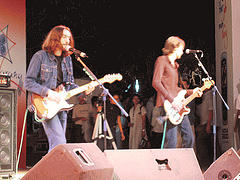
Matmatah in Saarang in 2005

The band was established in 1995 when Tristan Nihouarn, who at the time was a student pursuing study of Advanced Mathematics in Brest (western Brittany, France), met Cédric Floc'h who was studying electric engineering in the same city, where they both come from. Both were guitarists and together formed a chanson and guitar duo called the Tricards Twins, playing in a number of bars and pubs in Brittany. They developed a repertoire for playing songs from the sixties and seventies, with the Beatles, Neil Young and Simon and Garfunkel figuring prominently among their influences.

In one of their shows, they met bassist Éric Digaire and drummer Jean-François Paillard. Together, they formed Matmatah, named after Matmata, the village in Tunisia in which Nihouarn had lived during his childhood. Their first single, including two songs, "Lambé An Dro" and "Les Moutons" (The Sheep), was released in 1997, and within a few months had sold 30,000 copies.

The following studio album, La Ouache, sold 300,000 copies within six months (800,000 in total).

In 2001, the band released their live album, Lust for a Live, and a DVD entitled Piste Off. After a short rest period during which the band changed drummer they resumed their touring, this time for a number of humanitarian causes.

Their third studio album, Archie Kramer, released in October 2004, featured the singles Casi el silencio and Au Conditionnel.

At the end of October 2004, the band went on a world tour, including parts of Asia.

In 2007 their fourth studio album La Cerise (The Cherry) was released which is also the title of the first single.

Matmatah disbanded in August 2008 after a series of farewell gigs.

In September 2016, the group reformed and a tour started in February 2017. A fifth studio album was released on 3 March 2017: Plates Coutures (lit. flat seam, soundly defeated) presents 11 new songs concerned with society problems.

== Line-up ==
=== Last members ===
- Tristan Nihouarn (Stan) - vocals, rhythm guitar, flutes.
- Éric Digaire (Éric) - bass guitar, vocals, keyboards.
- Benoît Fournier (Scholl) - drums, percussion.
- Manu Baroux (Manu) - lead guitar, vocals.

=== Former members ===
- Cédric Floc'h (Sammy) - lead guitar, vocals.
- Jean-François Paillard (Fañch) - drums, percussion.

== Discography ==
=== Studio albums ===
- La Ouache (1998)
- Rebelote (2001)
- Archie Kramer (2004)
- La Cerise (2007)
- Antaology (2015)
- Plates Coutures (2017)
- Miscellanées Bissextiles (2023)
- L’Embardée (2026)

=== Live ===
- Lust for a Live (2002)
- 28, Capucines (2007)
- You're Here, Now What ? (2018)

=== EPs ===
- Concert (1999)
- ...and Time Goes Friendly (2005)
- Bande à part (2008)
- Les Demoiselles de Loctudy (2015)
- Nous y sommes (2017)
- Peshmerga (2017)
- Retour à la normale (2018)
