= La Ouache =

Studio album by Matmatah
- Released: 1998
- Genre: Rock
- Label: Trema

Matmatah chronology
La Ouache (1998)	Rebelote (2001)

La Ouache (pronounced [la waʃ]) is the first studio album by the French rock band Matmatah.

== Track listing ==
1. Anter-Ouache - Ouache
2. Emma
3. Lambé an Dro
4. Troglodyte
5. Kerfautras
6. Dernière Journée en Mer
7. L'Apologie
8. La Fille du Chat Noir
9. An Den Coz
10. Derrière Ton Dos
11. Les Moutons
12. La Complainte de Fanch
13. Ribette's

(Track listing acquired from Amazon.com's listings and )
