= Connie Dover =

American singer-songwriter

Connie Dover (born October 10, 1958) is an American singer-songwriter who primarily writes and performs Celtic music and American folk music.

== Biography ==
Dover was born in Jonesboro, Arkansas; her family moved frequently before settling in Kansas City, Missouri in 1969. She attended Avila University before dropping out to start her career playing bluegrass; she eventually returned to school and graduated from William Jewell College, graduating with a BA in history.

== Career ==
Dover joined Celtic band Scartaglen in the early 1980s, touring extensively and releasing three albums with the band. In the 1990s, she began a solo career and has released four solo albums since 1991's Somebody, all on the Taylor Park Music label, with noted Scottish musician Phil Cunningham of Silly Wizard serving as producer. She completed recording a CD of traditional Christmas songs and carols with the Kansas City Chamber Orchestra, entitled The Holly and the Ivy, which was released in 2008.

Her broadcast performances include guest appearances and features on NPR's Weekend Edition (Saturday and Sunday), A Prairie Home Companion, The Thistle & Shamrock, Mountain Stage and E-Town.

Connie's work as a writer and composer has flourished alongside her performance career. She received a 2007 Emmy Award for her production of acoustic music for the KCPT public television production Bad Blood: The Border War that Triggered the Civil War. Her original music earned a Grand Prize in the 2007 Yellowstone & Teton Song Contest, sponsored by the Western Folklife Center (Elko, Nevada), and she is a recipient of the Speakeasy Prize in Poetry, sponsored by The Loft, America's largest independent literary center. Her book of poems, Winter Count, was published in 2007 by Unholy Day Press.

Connie has twice been a finalist for the AFIM Indie Award, and other accolades for her music include being named a Top Ten Folk Release by Tower Records' Pulse! Magazine, a Winning Favourite Folk Release by The Scotsman, Scotland's National Newspaper, a Boston Globe Top Ten Folk Release, a nomination for Scotland's Living Tradition Award Album of the Year and a Creative Achievement Award from Time Warner's Hollywood On-Line. She has been a finalist for two Native American Music Awards, and for two New Age Voice Music Awards for Best Vocalist and Best Celtic Release.

== Discography ==
- Somebody, Taylor Park Music, 1991
- The Wishing Well, Taylor Park Music, 1994
- If Ever I Return, Taylor Park Music, 1997
- The Border of Heaven, Taylor Park Music, 2000
- The Holly & The Ivy, Taylor Park Music, 2009 (with the Kansas City Chamber Orchestra)
- Restless Angel, Taylor Park Music, 2016
