= Mairéad Ní Mhaonaigh =

Irish musician (born 1959)

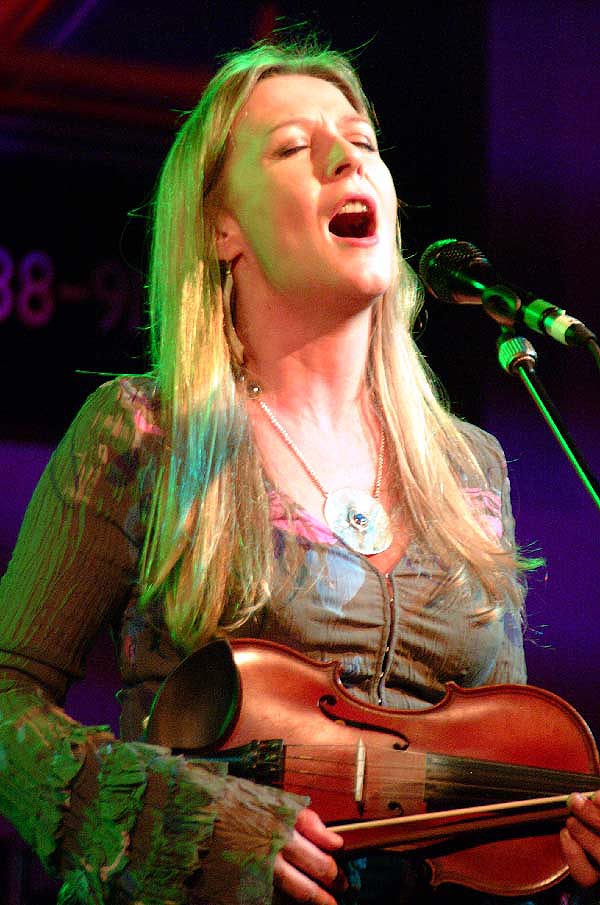
- Mairéad performing with Altan at Mardis de Plouescat in 2013

Background information
- Born: 26 July 1959 (age 66); Gweedore, County Donegal, Ireland
- Genres: Irish traditional; folk; World music
- Occupations: Musician, singer
- Instruments: Vocals, fiddle
- Years active: 1981–present
- Labels: Gael Linn: Virgin; Green Linnet; Compass
- Website: mairead.ie

Mairéad Ní Mhaonaigh (Irish pronunciation: [ˈmˠaɾʲeːd̪ˠ n̠ʲiː ˈwiːn̪ˠiː]; born 26 July 1959) is an Irish fiddler and the lead vocalist for the Irish folk music band Altan, which she co-founded with her husband Frankie Kennedy in 1987. Ní Mhaonaigh is recognised as a leading exponent in the Donegal fiddle tradition, and she is often considered one of the foremost singers in the Irish language, her native tongue. She was part of the Irish supergroup T with the Maggies who performed in January 2009 at Temple Bar TradFest in Dublin their first ever two concerts under that name and who released in October 2010 their debut (and to date only) album. After nearly 22 years with Altan, on 28 December 2008 Ní Mhaonaigh premiered in Gweedore (during the Frankie Kennedy Winter Music School) her debut solo album Imeall which was later released worldwide in February 2009. After 29 years with Altan, in October 2016 Ní Mhaonaigh released her alternate band Na Mooneys' debut album Na Mooneys.

== Background ==
Ní Mhaonaigh grew up in Gweedore, County Donegal, on the northwest coast of Ireland. Her father, Proinsias Ó Maonaigh, taught her to play the fiddle. She received tuition from fiddler Dinny McLaughlin, who was a frequent visitor to the home when she was young. Ciarán Tourish, who would later join Altan, was also a frequent visitor to the family home and also received tuition from McLaughlin.

Ní Mhaonaigh has two siblings:

- Her brother Gearóid Ó Maonaigh was an executive in an office for long years, played guitar for Ragairne (a short-lived band formed by Ní Mhaonaigh and Frankie Kennedy, of which singer Enya was a member), appeared on the album Ceol Aduaidh, and organised the Frankie Kennedy Winter School.
- Her younger sister Anna Ní Mhaonaigh, who was going from job to job, mostly in film and being PA to various TV projects, has contributed backing vocals to several albums and was a member of the (all female) group Macalla.

She met Frankie Kennedy at a session at age 15. Kennedy was inspired to learn to play and soon became a talented flute player. They married in 1981.

== Career ==
=== The early 1980s: Mairéad Ní Mhaonaigh & Frankie Kennedy duo, Ragairne ===
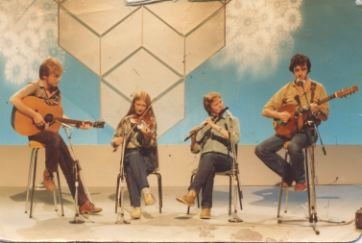
Ní Mhaonaigh with the short-lived band Ragairne on RTÉ television in the 1980s.

One evening, during a session in Gweedore (County Donegal), fifteen-year-old fiddle player Mairéad Ní Mhaonaigh, daughter of the session's leader Proinsias Ó Maonaigh, met with Belfast-born eighteen-year-old Frankie Kennedy during his summer trip to the Gaeltacht. They were attracted to each other, and Kennedy wrote to her regularly after leaving Donegal.

Kennedy was advised by a friend that he should learn an instrument if he intended to court Ní Mhaonaigh, and so he got a whistle and taught himself to play. Later he learned the flute, a somewhat louder instrument, so that he could hear himself in sessions. His love for her coupled with perfectionist tendencies turned him into a well-respected flute player.

Kennedy and Ní Mhaonaigh married in 1981.

The new couple continued to play at sessions in Donegal, and this formed the basis for their musical partnership. They made their recording debut on Albert Fry's eponymous record in 1979 and later formed a short-lived group called Ragairne which also included Gearóid Ó Maonaigh, Ní Mhaonaigh's brother, on guitar, Donal O'Hanlon from Newry on guitar, vocals and cittern and was rejoined in 1981 by singer Eithne Ní Bhraonáin, later known as Enya.

Joined by bouzouki player Ciarán Curran and Eithne Ní Bhraonáin, now known as Enya, on synthesizer, Frankie Kennedy and Ní Mhaonaigh released a recording entitled Ceol Aduaidh on Gael-Linn records in 1983.

At the time, Kennedy and Ní Mhaonaigh were earning their living by teaching at St. Oliver Plunkett National School in Malahide, north County Dublin. But live performances in 1984 and 1985, particularly in the United States, convinced them that there was an audience for "no-compromise traditional music played with heart and drive," and they were persuaded to give up teaching.

During this time, the group added guitarist Mark Kelly and released in 1987 a record called Altan, named after a lake in Donegal, although the name Altan wasn't used for the band on that release. Altan was produced by Dónal Lunny, who subsequently appeared as either a producer or guest musician on every Altan album which followed.

=== 1987–present: Altan ===
Forsaking their jobs as teachers, Ní Mhaonaigh and Kennedy formed the band Altan during the late 1980s. Kennedy's death from cancer in 1994 put the band's future in question, but she decided to continue at Kennedy's explicit request.

As well as her work with Altan, Ní Mhaonaigh over the years has presented traditional music programmes on radio and television, including the radio show, The Long Note and the television series, The Pure Drop.

=== 2005–present: String Sisters ===
Ní Mhaonaigh is a member of the fiddle ensemble String Sisters active as a band since 2005.

=== 2007–present: T with the Maggies ===
Ní Mhaonaigh along with friends Moya Brennan, Maighread Ní Dhomhnaill and Tríona Ní Dhomhnaill came together as T with the Maggies in 2007, and released their debut album T with the Maggies in October 2010.

=== 2007–present: Solo work & solo live performances ===
Ní Mhaonaigh performing with her father.

In 2007/08, Ní Mhaonaigh recorded Imeall, her debut (studio) album in the home studio of her friend and musician/co-producer Manus Lunny in Tír Chonaill, County Donegal, Ireland. On 28 December 2008, at the Frankie Kennedy Winter Music School in Gweedore, Ní Mhaonaigh premiered live some songs from the album in an intimate concert with Lunny. For this occasion, she also released a small number of copies of the album. On 12 February 2009, the album was officially launched in Dublin and released worldwide. Only 3000 physical copies were pressed and made available worldwide from her website. The title is Irish for 'Edge' or 'Threshold' and the album features traditional/folk songs as well as new compositions by Ní Mhaonaigh.

Ní Mhaonaigh previously performed two special concerts in January 2008 at the Temple Bar TradFest with long-time friends Moya Brennan, Maighread Ní Dhomhnaill and Tríona Ní Dhomhnaill. It was the second time the four musicians ever performed together. It was also the first time Ní Mhaonaigh performed live some songs from her then yet-to-be (worldwide) released solo album Imeall. For the occasion, she was joined by special guests who spent the last few years recording with her.

Since February 2009, Ní Mhaonaigh (fiddle, lead vocals) has toured solo and (mostly) as a trio with Manus Lunny (bouzouki) & James Higgins (percussions). She has also guested a few times with other musicians such as French flutist Sylvain Barou (in June 2013 in Calais, France and in April 2014 in L'Île-d'Yeu, France) and French violinist Didier Lockwood (also in June 2013 in Calais).

Ní Mhaonaigh also contributed a track, Má Théid Tú Chun Aonaigh to the Irish charitable album Ceol Cheann Dubhrann which was released in December 2009 to raise funds for two projects in Ranafast, a Gaeltacht area from which she has collected songs.

Ní Mhaonaigh performed live on 28 January 2018 at Rathfarnham Castle, Dublin, Ireland.

Along with her daughter Nia Byrne and her long-time fellow friend, neighbour and producer Manus Lunny, she performed live (before a backstage audience) a (39:50) set of tunes and songs (Note: Some of them totally new and some of them having just been recorded in the studio by Mairéad.) on 3 October 2020 at the Cork Opera as part of the Cork Folk Festival. The live performance was filmed and the stream video was made available through the Cork Folk Festival Facebook page.

On 17 January 2021, Ní Mhaonaigh announced that "[she'd] been really busy composing music for the An Grianán Theatre, Letterkenny, County Donegal", to be part of this year's Letterkenny Trad Week 2021. The song for the suite she composed is entitled "Ré an tSolais" which means "The Time of Light". (Note: About her new music, she stated that "since lockdown last March [2020], [she had] been walking regularly around the shores near [her] home and garnering inspiration from the beauty of the nature that surrounds us all" and that "the light can change the mood of a place and of people. There is nothing like the welcome of a beautiful sunrise to raise our spirits." She also added that "[she's] optimistic that things will get brighter in our future and [she] hope[s] [her new] music [...] will bring a little glimmer of hope to all.") Mairéad Ní Mhaonaigh and Friends Full Concert was held as a live stream on Sunday evening 24 January 2021 (at 8pm GMT) (€10 per household) during Letterkenny Trad Week 2021 at the An Grianán Theatre. Benefits were due to go to Donegal Cancer Flights and Services and Donegal Hospice.

On 5 March 2021, Ní Mhaonaigh announced that her new music piece "Ré an tSolais" would be broadcast on TG4 as part of a show due to be performed on St Patrick's Day 2021 (at 9:30pm GMT). Ní Mhaonaigh teamed up with friends for this televised concert on TG4 on 17 March 2021, also called "Ré an tSolais". Along with this new composition, (Note: Commissioned by An Grianán Theatre and streamed online earlier this year 2021 as part of Letterkenny Trad Week, "Ré an tSolais" was inspired by the hope of a new era after the intensity of the pandemic lockdown.) the show featured other new Mairéad Ní Mhaonaigh music like "An Grianstad" / "The Halting Sun" (2020) (Note: ... commissioned by The Rolling Wave RTÉ Radio 1 / ITMA.) and "Scread na Bealtaine" (2020), (Note: ... commissioned by Earagail Arts Festival.) and some of her original music pieces. (Note: Indeed, the setlist includes two other Mairéad Ní Mhaonaigh-written tracks: a Ní Mhaonaigh solo song entitled "Mo Níon Ó" (2007/2008) (Mairéad Ní Mhaonaigh) and a Na Mooneys' instrumental medley "Mazurka Róise / The Co. Down Mazurka" (2016) (Mairéad Ní Mhaonaigh//Traditional)) Ní Mhaonaigh was joined by special guests including Manus Lunny, members of Altan, her nephew (and Na Mooneys fellow band member) Ciarán Ó Maonaigh, and the Harrigan and McGrory families (as openers). (Note: This (0h58:55) special "Ré an tSolais" show on 17 March 2021 opened with a (0h15:20) set of tracks (titles unknown) performed by the Harrigan and McGrory families as guests. The setlist from Mairéad Ní Mhaonaigh & Friends (0h43:35) own set is: #1 An Grianstad (2020)* (3:52) (Mairéad Ní Mhaonaigh) #2 The Halting Sun (2020)* (2:49) (Mairéad Ní Mhaonaigh) #3 Scread na Bealtaine (2020)* (1:59) (Mairéad Ní Mhaonaigh) #4 Mazurka Róise / The Co. Down Mazurka (2016)** (3:34) (Mairéad Ní Mhaonaigh//Traditional) #5 Mo Níon Ó (2007/2008)* (4:29) (Mairéad Ní Mhaonaigh) #6 Con Cassidy's Highland (1987)*** (4:12) (traditional, arranged by Frankie Kennedy, Mairéad Ní Mhaonaigh, Mark Kelly, Ciarán Curran) #7 "Ré an tSolais" suite (2021)† (20:18) (Mairéad Ní Mhaonaigh) (including part 1 (instrumental) (12.14); part 2 (song) (5.27); part 3 (instrumental finale) (2021) (2.37)) (with *: Mairéad Ní Mhaonaigh track; **: Na Mooneys' cover; ***: Frankie Kennedy & Mairéad Ní Mhaonaigh track; †: Manus Lunny, Martin Tourish, Mark Kelly & Mairéad Ní Mhaonaigh (new) track).)

=== 2013–present: Na Mooneys ===
On 7 January 2016, Ní Mhaonaigh announced on her Facebook page that the new band called Na Mooneys that she had formed (along with her nephew Ciarán Ó Maonaigh and her siblings Anna Ní Mhaonaigh and Gearóid Ó Maonaigh) two years earlier (during the last Frankie Kennedy Winter School (Note: The last Frankie Kennedy Winter School occurred in late December 2013 / early January 2014.) where they performed their first ever show) were in the process of recording their debut family album. On their Facebook page (created on 7 January 2016), the band describe themselves as «a family of musicians & singers from the Donegal Gaeltacht» playing Irish traditional music.

On 6 February 2016, the new band Na Mooneys announced that they were just near the end of the recording of their debut album in Manus Lunny's studio, with Anna and Mairéad Ní Mhaonaigh putting down some vocals for a few songs, before to get ready for the mix.

On 4 June 2016, Na Mooneys took part in the "Féile Ceoil" event ("music festival" in Irish Gaelic) in Gweedore, County Donegal, Ireland.

On 30 June 2016, Na Mooneys announced that they are due to perform on 12 July 2016 at Ionad Cois Locha, Dún Lúiche, Ireland, during the Trad Trathnona ("Trad Afternoon"), County Donegal's Summer of traditional Sessions (to occur each Tuesday in July & August).

On 9 September 2016, Na Mooneys announced that they are due to perform their Dublin debut show on 29 January 2017 at St. Michan's Church during the Temple Bar TradFest.

On 19 September 2016, Na Mooneys announced the (then forthcoming) release on 6 October 2016 of Na Mooneys, their debut (eponymous) album «of Irish traditional music and song from the Donegal Gaeltacht», revealed its 15-track list and made available a streaming audio version of the first track from it, "Dónal na Gealaí". The album line-up includes Mairéad Ní Mhaonaigh on fiddle & song, Gearóid Ó Maonaigh on guitar, Anna Ní Mhaonaigh on whistle and song and Ciarán Ó Maonaigh on fiddle & octave fiddle with special guests Nia Byrne on fiddle & song, Manus Lunny on bouzouki & keyboards and Caitlín Nic Gabhann on concertina, foot percussion & dance.

=== 2018–present: The SíFiddlers ===
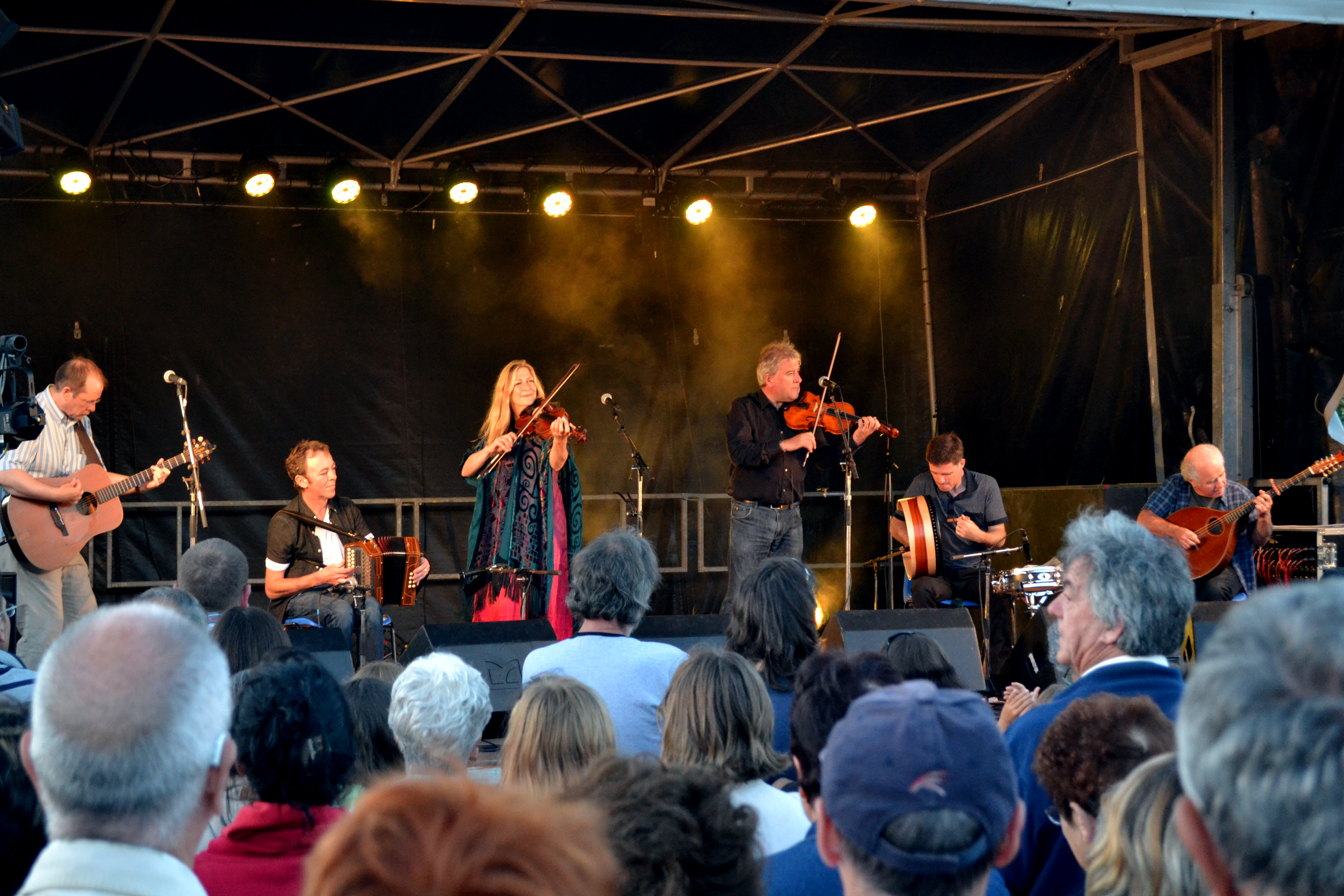
Ní Mhaonaigh performing with Altan in 2013

The SíFiddlers are a group of 13 female Donegal fiddlers including Na Mooneys (indeed, "The SíFiddlers" can be translated from Irish to English as "The She Fiddlers") who first came together in Summer 2018 during the Earagail Arts Festival. Their performance at the festival was a huge success, concluding with upwards of 30 fellow female fiddlers from Donegal joining the SíFiddlers on stage for an epic finale celebrating the healthy state of female fiddling in Donegal at present. The 13 members are:

1. Denise Boyle from Glenties
2. Tara Connaghan from Glenties
3. Liz Doherty from Buncrana
4. Aisling Drost-Byrne from Glencolmcille
5. Clare Friel (from The Friel Sisters) from Derrynamansher
6. Claire Gallagher from Kilcar
7. Brid Harper from Castlefinn
8. Melanie Houton from Malin
9. Theresa Kavanagh from Gortahork
10. Eimear McColgan from Malin
11. Roisin McGrory from Culdaff
12. Mairead Ni Mhaonaigh from Gaoth Dobhair
13. Clodagh Warnock from Moville

On 3 September 2019, the Donegal fiddle music band The SíFiddlers announced, via their Facebook page, that they were recording their debut album.

On 1 July 2020, The SíFiddlers released (first, on digital format, for download only) their (12-track) debut album, simply entitled Donegal Fiddle. (Note: Recording, mixing & mastering by Manus Lunny; design/logo by Édain O'Donnell; photography by John Soffe.) Physical copies were due to be available around the 5 July 2020.

Siobhan Peoples (daughter of Tommy Peoples) warmly reviewed the album. (Note: "If you're looking for a recording that introduces you to staples such as Dinky Dorians and The Oak Tree, right through to newer compositions such as, The Red Crow, this is for you. Wonderful playing from the entire collective and the more intimate duets and trios that feature, it is testament to the love that these women have for the unique tradition of their beloved home place" ~Siobhan Peoples.)

=== Fall 2022: Irish (& UK) concert tour with Cormac De Barra & Mark Redmond ===
On 4 September 2022, it was announced that Ní Mhaonaigh (fiddle / vocals) would do a 9-date autumnal Irish (& UK) concert tour from 14 September to 2 October 2022 with harpist Cormac De Barra (harp / vocals) and piper Mark Redmond (uilleann pipes / flute / whistles) in Dublin, Dún Laoghaire, Tinahely, Baile Mhúirne, Hammersmith (London), Clifden, Belmullet, Newbridge, Cork (€5-€25).

== Personal life ==
Ní Mhaonaigh had a daughter named Nia Byrne (Nia Ní Bheirn) (born on 8 October 2003) (Note: The First Na Mooneys' album supporting show occurred on 8 October 2016 at the Glenties Fiddle concert in Highlands Hotel, Glenties, County Donegal, Ireland. This was Nia Byrne's 13th birthday.) with fellow Altan musician Dermot Byrne, whom she married in October 1999. Ní Mhaonaigh and Byrne went separate ways before her first solo album in 2009.

== Accolades ==
Ní Mhaonaigh was named "Donegal Person of the Year" in 2009.

Ní Mhaonaigh has been honoured on 14 December 2016 with the 2017 "Gradam Ceoil TG4" award for "Traditional Musician of the Year".

== Discography ==
=== Solo albums ===
- 2009 Imeall

=== As Frankie Kennedy & Mairéad Ní Mhaonaigh ===
- 1983 Ceol Aduaidh
- 1987 Altan

=== With Altan ===
- 1989 Horse with a Heart
- 1990 The Red Crow
- 1991 Harvest Storm
- 1993 Island Angel
- 1996 Blackwater
- 1997 Runaway Sunday
- 2000 Another Sky
- 2002 The Blue Idol
- 2005 Local Ground
- 2010 25th Anniversary Celebration (a compilation of studio re-recordings of previous material (plus one new song) with orchestral arrangements)
- 2012 Gleann Nimhe - The Poison Glen
- 2015 The Widening Gyre
- 2018 The Gap of Dreams
- 2024 Donegal

=== With String Sisters ===
- 2007 Live (CD/DVD)

=== With T with the Maggies ===
- 2010 T with the Maggies

=== With Na Mooneys ===
- 2016 Na Mooneys
- 2017 "Soilse na Nollag" (4:26), single released on 17 December 2017 by Na Mooneys and Manus Lunny (A Christmas Song or Carol, composed by Francie Mooney and Mairéad Ní Mhaonaigh (his daughter) (Note: "Soilse na Nollag" was made available to help raise funds for the St. Vincent de Paul Society who help people who are disadvantaged all year round, and whose help is especially needed by people at Christmas.)

=== With The SíFiddlers ===
- 2020 Donegal Fiddle (Note: Recording, mixing & mastering by Manus Lunny; design/logo by Édain O'Donnell; photography by John Soffe.)

=== Guest roles ===
- 1991 Albert Fry (Albert Fry)
- 1991 Fiddle Sticks (various artists)
- 1993 The Holy Ground (Mary Black)
- 1994 Lullaby: A Collection (various artists - Ní Mhaonaigh sings The Cradle Song, wrongly attributed to Karan Casey)
- 2001 Little Sparrow (Dolly Parton)
- 2001 Volume 3: Further in Time (Afro Celt Sound System)
- 2008 Tráthnóna Beag Aréir (Albert Fry)
- 2008 The Original Transatlantic Sessions DVD (various artists)

== Sources ==
- "Altan's History". Altan band web site. Archived from the original on 19 December 2005.
- O'Regan, John. "Angels of the Island". The Living Tradition. Archived from the original on 11 March 2006.
- Robinson, Michael (Fall 1995). "An Interview with Mairéad Ní Mhaonaigh". Fiddler Magazine.
- Vallely, Fintan; Piggott, Charlie (1998). Blooming Meadows: The World of Irish Traditional Musicians. Nutan. Roberts Rinehart Publishers. ISBN 1-86059-067-5.
