= Scoil Gheimhridh Frankie Kennedy =

- Genre: Traditional Irish
- Dates: 27 December – 2 January
- Locations: Gaoth Dobhair, County Donegal, Ireland
- Years active: December 1994 – January 2014
- Founders: Mairéad Ní Mhaonaigh
- Website: www.FrankieKennedy.com

Scoil Gheimhridh Frankie Kennedy ("Frankie Kennedy Winter School") was a traditional music winter school held annually in Gweedore, County Donegal, Ireland starting December 1994 in memory of Belfast flautist Frankie Kennedy (from Irish folk music band Altan) who died on 19 September 1994. The last session ended in January 2014. It has been succeeded by the "Scoil Gheimhridh Ghaoth Dobhair" ("Gweedore Winter School").

== Overview ==
The festival, which ran throughout the end of December until 2 January, featured some of Ireland's best-known musicians as well as friends of Frankie's from Scotland and further afield. It also presented a unique learning environment for musicians and arrangers. Classes are provided in flute, fiddle, uilleann pipes, tin whistle, bodhrán, button accordion, bouzouki, sean-nós singing, house dancing, and guitar.

In 2008, the festival introduced a new class, Arranging Irish Music and Song, which was taught by traditional music veteran Dáithí Sproule.

In 2007, the festival brought singers such as Muireann Nic Amhlaoibh and Julie Fowlis to perform.

The final Scoil Gheimhridh took place from Friday 27 December 2013 until Wednesday 1 January 2014. On this occasion, Mairéad Ní Mhaonaigh (from Irish folk music band Altan), her siblings Anna Ní Mhaonaigh and Gearóid Ó Maonaigh and her nephew Ciarán Ó Maonaigh (Gearóid's son) formed the Irish folk music band Na Mooneys where they performed their first ever show. Na Mooneys released their debut album Na Mooneys on 6 October 2016.

Until the end, the Scoil Gheimhridh Frankie Kennedy was ever-expanding and attendance was still continuing to flourish.

== Performers ==
It has become tradition that Kennedy's old band Altan headline every year at the festival, but other well-known musicians have played at the school:

- Liam O'Flynn
- Skara Brae
- Seán Keane
- Sean Potts
- Arty McGlynn
- Téada
- Marcas Ó Murchú
- Muireann Nic Amhlaoibh
- Julie Fowlis
- T with the Maggies
- Na Mooneys
