= Irish Music (magazine) =

Irish folk music magazine

- Mairéad Ní Mhaonaigh on the cover August 1997
- Categories: Irish music
- Frequency: Monthly
- First issue: 4 March 1974
- Country: Ireland
- Language: English, Irish
- Website: www.irishmusicmagazine.com

Irish Music is a monthly music magazine covering folk and traditional Irish music.
