= TradFest =

Irish music and culture festival

TradFest is an annual music and culture festival that takes place at the end of January in Dublin, Ireland. The festival, which celebrates Irish traditional and folk music and cultural offerings, was founded by the Temple Bar Company, a not-for-profit organisation who work on behalf of businesses in the cultural quarter of Temple Bar, Dublin. The inaugural event was held in 2006. Events at subsequent festivals have been programmed on Moore Street and in Fingal.

The festival has attracted a number of performers internationally in folk and traditional Irish music such as Billy Bragg, Donovan, Janis Ian, Mary Chapin Carpenter, Martin Carthy, Maria McKee, Fairport Convention, Eddi Reader, Sarah Jarosz, Ralph McTell, Gilbert O’Sullivan, Steeleye Span and Levellers. Notable Irish acts who have performed include Glen Hansard, Stephen Rea, Matt Molloy, Sean Keane, Aoife O’Donovan, Frankie Gavin, Séamus Begley, Damien Dempsey, Declan O’Rourke, Paul Brady, Mundy, Mick Flannery, Maura O’Connell, Finbar Furey, The Dublin Legends, Clannad, Altan, Beoga, Martin Hayes, Kíla, and Stockton's Wing.

== History ==
Since its inception by the Temple Bar Company in 2006, TradFest has expanded its offering to reflect its ethos of "Trad without Frontiers". This allows for a varied line-up at each festival that incorporates various musical forms including Celtic folk, folk, folk rock, nu folk, world music, and traditional Irish music. The incentive was to provide a musical interlude for Irish and international visitors in January, a month hitherto without any festival events.

Since it formed, TradFest has used a number of Dublin's historic buildings to host its concerts. Previous venues have included Dublin Castle, St Patrick's Cathedral, the National Stadium, St. Stephen's Church (the Pepper Canister), the Button Factory and the Grand Social.

In 2023, TradFest partnered with Fingal County Council to expand TradFest and program TradFest concerts in the county of Fingal. Artists who have performed at TradFest in Fingal include Janis Ian, Ralph McTell, Frankie Gavin, Stephen Rea, Liam Ó Maonlaí, Stockton's Wing and Cathy Jordan. Venues have included Malahide Castle, Swords Castle, Donabate Parish Hall, St. Patrick's Church, the Millbank Theatre, Skerries Mill, the Séamus Ennis Arts Centre, Draíocht and Shackleton Gardens.

== Past events ==
Several past festivals have played a part in TradFest reaching a wider international audience. The Kilfenora Céilí Band performed a free concert on top of the hotel belonging to U2, the Clarence Hotel. Beoga did a naked photo shoot for the festival before going on to perform in Ed Sheeran's "Galway Girl" and on the Pyramid Stage at Glastonbury in 2017.

Previous concerts include a Clannad reunion at Christ Church Cathedral in 2011 and The Dubliners celebrating their 50th anniversary at the same venue in 2012. The festival has also supported contemporary commissions including two by the composer Lorcan Mac Mathuna to celebrate the Battle of Clontarf and the 1916 Rising. T with the Maggies (featuring Moya Brennan, Mairéad Ní Mhaonaigh, Tríona Ní Dhomhnaill and Maighread Ní Dhomhnaill) first came together at the 2009 festival at the suggestion of their respective children and went on to perform at the Irish Global Economic summit that year.

Due to the COVID-19 pandemic, the 2021 festival was unable to take place. It was replaced by an online version, filmed at Dublin Castle and featuring a number of high-profile Irish artists.

In 2024, TradFest invited folk performers Janis Ian and Ralph McTell to perform and receive a Lifetime Achievement Award at the festival. Irish artist Hozier made a surprise appearance during Allison Russell's performance at St. Patrick's Cathedral in 2024. Also in 2024, the festival featured a new TradFest musical commission Ocean Child by composer Neil Martin and performed by Actor, Stephen Rea commemorating the 170th anniversary of the tragic sinking of The RMS Tayleur, off Lambay Island, also known as the first Titanic.

== Notable artists ==
Notable artists who have previously performed at TradFest have included: Afro Celt Sound System, Altan, Aoife Scott, Andy Irvine & Donal Lunny, Aoife O'Donovan, Barbara Dickson, Bellowhead, Beoga, Big Country, Billy Bragg, Caoimhín Ó Raghallaigh, Cara Dillon, Carlos Núñez Muñoz, Cathy Davey, Cherish the Ladies, Clannad, Damien Dempsey, Danu, Declan O'Rourke, Declan Sinnott, Dervish, Dhol Foundation, Dick Gaughan, Donovan, Dougie MacLean, Duke Special, Eddi Reader, Eleanor McEvoy, Fairport Convention, Finbar Furey, Frances Black, Frankie Gavin, Gilbert O'Sullivan, Glen Hansard, Hazel O'Connor, Hothouse Flowers, Iarla O’Lionaird, In Tua Nua, Judy Collins, Julie Fowlis, Kathryn Roberts & Sean Lakeman, Janis Ian, Judy Collins, Kíla, Lankum, Loah, Levellers, Luka Bloom, Lúnasa, Maria McKee, Martin Carthy & Eliza Carthy, Martin Hayes, Maura O'Connell, Mick Flannery, Mundy, Oysterband, Paddy Keenan, Paul Brady, Ralph McTell, Sarah Jarosz, Séamus Begley, Seth Lakeman, Sharon Shannon, Steeleye Span, Stephen James Smith, Stockton's Wing, Sweeney's Men, Teddy Thompson, T with the Maggies, The Dubliners, The Fureys, The Undertones, The Young 'Uns, Turin Brakes.

== Sponsors ==
- Temple Bar Company
- The Arts Council of Ireland
- Fingal County Council
- Department of Tourism, Culture, Arts, Gaeltacht, Sport, and Media
- Dublin City Council
- Diageo
- Fáilte Ireland
- Tourism Ireland
- Office of Public Works
- RTÉ
- Culture Ireland
- Irish Music Magazine
