= Tommy Peoples =

Irish fiddler (1948–2018)

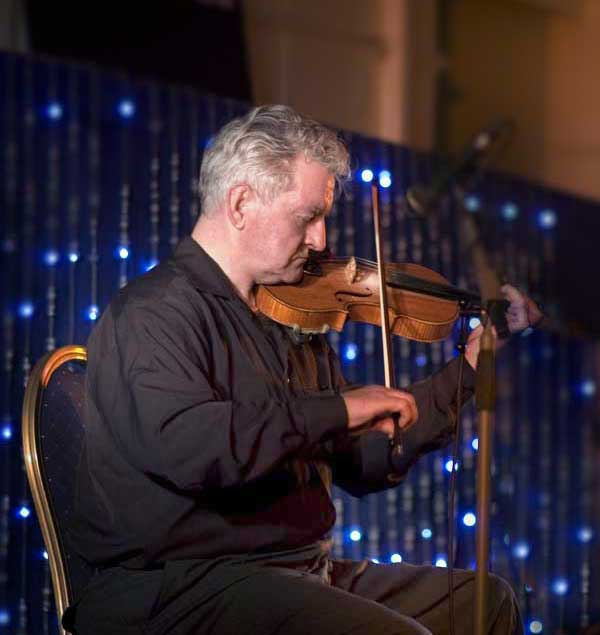
- Tommy Peoples, performing in September 2009

Background information
- Born: Tommy Peoples; 20 September 1948; Donegal, Ireland
- Died: 4 August 2018 (aged 69) Ballybofey, County Donegal, Ireland
- Genres: Traditional Irish, celtic
- Occupation: Musician
- Instrument: fiddle
- Labels: Shanachie, Green Linnet, Comhaltas Ceoltóirí Éireann, Solo, Waltons, GTD Heritage Recording Co, Seán Walshe, Tommy Peoples Publishing
- Website: https://tommypeoples.ie/

Tommy Peoples (20 September 1948 – 4 August 2018) was an Irish fiddler who played in the Donegal fiddle tradition.

== Biography ==
Peoples was born near St Johnston, County Donegal, Ireland. He was a member of traditional Irish music groups, including The Bothy Band as well as performing solo from the late 1960s. He played in the fiddle style of East Donegal. After moving to Dublin in the 1960s, where he was employed as a Garda (member of the Irish police force), he subsequently moved to County Clare and married Mary Linnane (daughter of Kitty Linnane, long-time leader of the Kilfenora Céilí Band). The family lived in St Johnston. His daughter, Siobhán Peoples, is also a fiddler.

Peoples was the Traditional Musician In Residence at The Balor Arts Centre, Ballybofey, County Donegal. In July 2015, he launched a self-published book, Ó Am go hAm - From Time to Time. The book combines a fiddle tutor by Peoples, along with illustrations and a complete notation of 130 original tunes by Peoples. The book also includes many stories and incidents from his life and musical career. He died on 4 August 2018, aged 69.

== Discography ==
=== With The Bothy Band ===
- The Bothy Band (Mulligan, 1975) (Green Linnet, 1983)

=== Solo ===
- An Exciting Session with One of Ireland's Leading Traditional Fiddlers (Comhaltas Ceoltóirí Éireann, 1976)
- The High Part of the Road (Shanachie, 1976) [accompanied by Paul Brady]
- A Traditional Experience with Tommy Peoples: A Master Irish Traditional Fiddle Player (Solo, 1977)
- The Iron Man (Shanachie, 1985) [accompanied by Dáithí Sproule]
- Fiddler's Fancy: Fifty Irish Fiddle Tunes Collected and Performed by the Irish Fiddle Legend (Waltons, 1986) [accompanied by Manus Lunny]
- Traditional Irish Music Played on the Fiddle (released by GTD Heritage Recording Co. in 1993, but recorded by Seán Walshe in 1982)
- The Quiet Glen/An Gleann Ciuin (Tommy Peoples Publishing, 1998) [accompanied by Alph Duggan]
- Waiting for a Call (Shanachie, 2003)

=== With Matt Molloy and Paul Brady ===
- Matt Molloy . Paul Brady . Tommy Peoples (Green Linnet, 1977)

=== With Paul Brady ===
- Welcome Here Kind Stranger (Green Linnet, 1978; remastered on PeeBee Music CD in 2009) [Peoples plays on four tracks]

== Bibliography ==
- Sarah Lifton (1983) The Listener's Guide to Folk Music, p. 74, ISBN 0-87196-720-0 .
- Harry Long (2005) The Waltons Guide to Irish Music, p. 309-10, ISBN 1-85720-177-9 .
- Neal Walters & Brian Mansfield (ed.) (1998) MusicHound Folk: The Essential Album Guide, p. 623-5, ISBN 1-57859-037-X (the source of his birth date).
