= T with the Maggies =

Irish folk music band

- From left to right: Tríona Ní Dhomhnaill, Maighread Ní Dhomhnaill, Moya Brennan and Mairéad Ní Mhaonaigh, recording in Manus Lunny's studio, 2010.

Background information
- Origin: County Donegal, Ireland
- Genres: Celtic; Folk; Irish traditional
- Years active: 2007 – present
- Labels: TWTM Music (World); Compass Records (USA)
- Members: Tríona Ní Dhomhnaill; Maighread Ní Dhomhnaill; Mairéad Ní Mhaonaigh; Moya Brennan
- Website: www.twiththemaggies.com

T with the Maggies are an Irish traditional supergroup from County Donegal, Ireland. The group first performed together in 2007 at a tribute concert to folk singer and guitarist Mícheál Ó Domhnaill, older brother of Triona and Maighread, and released their debut album in October 2010.

== History ==
=== Background ===
Band members Moya Brennan, Mairéad Ní Mhaonaigh, Tríona Ní Dhomhnaill and Maighread Ní Dhomhnaill had performed together since the early 1970s during special events and as members of different groups, although not as a foursome.

Moya has been lead singer and frontwoman of Grammy-award-winning group Clannad since the beginning of the 1970s and is the eldest of the Brennan family, Ireland's most successful musical family, of which younger siblings Enya and Brídín have previously performed.

Mairéad (who was a member of a short-lived group Ragairne, with Enya) has been the front-woman, singer and a fiddle player with Altan, which she founded with her late husband Frankie Kennedy.

Maighread and Tríona were members of influential traditional Skara Brae. Both recorded albums with Dónal Lunny, while Tríona became singer with The Bothy Band, Relativity, Nightnoise and Touchstone.

All four are successful solo artists.

=== Debut ===
In May 2007, Irish folk musicians from around the world gathered in Dublin to celebrate the life and music of singer Mícheál Ó Domhnaill, who had died the previous July. His sisters Maighread and Tríona performed along with Moya and Mairéad, the first time all four singers had performed together, despite many collaborations in different compositions.

At Temple Bar TradFest 2009, the group performed in Dublin on 31 January 2009 their first ever two concerts under the name "T with the Maggies" respectively at the Ark Children's Theatre (2.00pm) and at the Button Factory (8.00pm). In the same year, they were invited to perform at the 2009 Irish Global Economic summit. They were commissioned to record the folk song "Two Sisters" by Sam Shepard for his play Ages of the Moon, which opened in New York and Dublin, starring actors Stephen Rea and Seán McGinley.

The group name, "T with the Maggies" was decided upon as Maighread, Mairéad and Moya had often performed together, and humorously called themselves "The Maggies". The group's first performance was the first in which all four collaborated on the same project, adding "T" for Tríona.

Their debut album, T with the Maggies, was released at the end of October 2010.

== Discography ==
- T with the Maggies (2010)
