= Clannad discography =

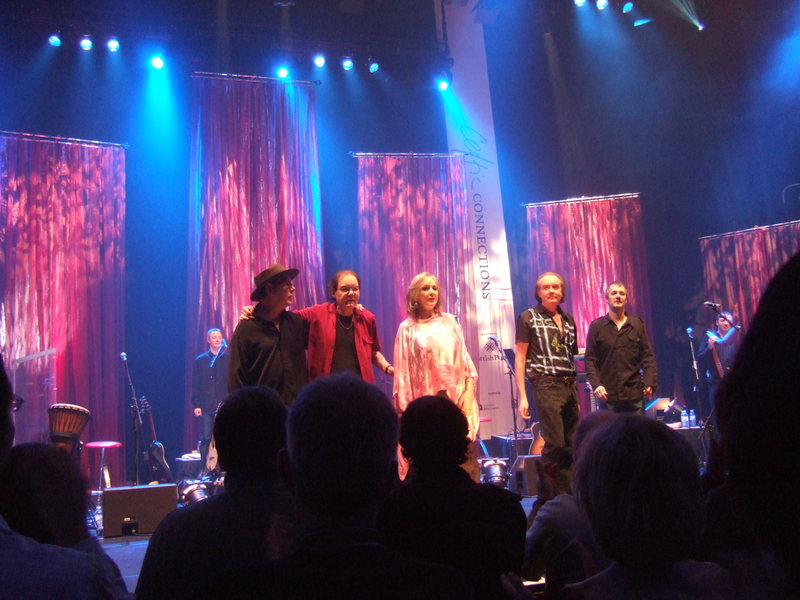
- Clannad at the 2007 Celtic Connections festival in Glasgow, United Kingdom.
- Studio albums: 13
- Extended plays: 1
- Soundtrack albums: 3
- Live albums: 4
- Compilation albums: 18
- Singles: 33
- Video albums: 2
- Music videos: 13
- Box sets: 3

The discography of Clannad, an Irish musical group, consists of thirteen studio albums, four live albums, three soundtrack albums, seventeen compilation albums, thirty-one singles and a number of other appearances.

Clannad achieved a breakthrough in their career in 1983 with the song "Theme from Harry's Game", which peaked at number five in the United Kingdom and won an Ivor Novello award. Clannad won a BAFTA for their 1984 Legend, the soundtrack for the Robin of Sherwood series. In 1998, Clannad were awarded a Grammy Award for their studio album Landmarks.

== Albums ==
=== Studio albums ===
Title	Album details	Peak chart positions									
Title	Album details	IRE	AUS	BEL (FLA)	CAN	GER	NL	NZ	UK	US	US World
Clannad	Released: 1973; Label: Philips; Formats: LP, MC	—	—	—	—	—	—	—	—	—	—
Clannad 2	Released: 1974; Label: Gael-Linn; Formats: LP, MC	—	—	—	—	—	—	—	—	—	—
Dúlamán	Released: 1976; Label: Gael-Linn; Formats: LP, MC	—	—	—	—	—	—	—	—	—	—
Crann Úll	Released: 1980; Label: Tara; Formats: LP, MC	—	—	—	—	—	—	—	79 (Note: Chart peak in 1994.)	—	—
Fuaim	Released: March 1982; Label: Tara; Formats: LP, MC	—	—	—	—	—	—	—	—	—	—
Magical Ring	Released: 21 March 1983; Label: RCA; Formats: LP, MC	—	66	—	—	—	20	—	26	—	10 (Note: Chart peak in 1994.)
Macalla	Released: 14 October 1985; Label: RCA; Formats: CD, LP, MC	—	59	—	—	—	12	29	33	131	—
Sirius	Released: 26 October 1987; Label: RCA; Formats: CD, LP, MC	—	76	—	84	—	45	—	34	183	—
Anam	Released: 8 October 1990; Label: RCA; Formats: CD, LP, MC	—	111	—	—	—	59	37	14	46 (Note: Chart peak upon release in the US in 1993.)	3
Banba	Released: 3 May 1993; Label: RCA; Formats: CD, MC	27	53	—	66	—	11	47	5	110	1
Lore	Released: 27 February 1996; Label: RCA; Formats: CD, 2xCD, MC	10	45	—	—	—	16	17	14	195	1
Landmarks	Released: 3 March 1998; Label: RCA; Formats: CD, MC	20	92	—	—	—	13	—	34	—	6
Nádúr	Released: 20 September 2013; Label: ARC Music; Formats: CD, LP, digital download	24	—	172	—	100	58	—	100	—	2
"—" denotes releases that did not chart or were not released in that territory.

=== Live albums ===
Title	Album details
Clannad in Concert	Released: 1979; Label: Ogham; Formats: LP, MC; Recorded in Switzerland, 1978
Ring Of Gold	Released: 1986; Label: Celtic Music; Formats: LP, Cassette, CD; A compilation of tracks taken from the 2nd & 3rd Irish Folk Festival albums 1975 & 1976. Recorded live in Germany.
Clannad: Christ Church Cathedral	Released: February 2013; Label: ARC Music; Formats: CD; Recorded in Dublin, January 2011
Turas 1980	Released: 1 June 2018; Label: MIG; Formats: 2xCD, 2xLP, digital download; Recorded in Bremen, January 1980
Clannad: Live in Concert	Released: March 2005; Label: MDM, Koch; Formats: CD; Recorded in Europe, 1996

=== Soundtrack albums ===
Title	Album details	Peak chart positions		
Title	Album details	NZ	UK	US World
Legend	Released: April 1984; Label: RCA; Formats: CD, LP, MC; Soundtrack to the television series Robin of Sherwood	9	15	15 (Note: Chart peak in 1995.)
Atlantic Realm	Released: January 1989; Label: BBC; Formats: CD, LP, MC; Soundtrack to the television series The Natural World: Atlantic Realm	—	41	—
The Angel and the Soldier Boy	Released: 11 December 1989; Label: RCA; Formats: CD, LP, MC; Soundtrack to the film of the same name	41	—	—
"—" denotes releases that did not chart or were not released in that territory.

=== Compilation albums ===
Title	Album details	Peak chart positions							
Title	Album details	IRE	AUS	GER	NL	NOR	NZ	UK	US World
The Collection	Released: 1986; Label: K-tel; Formats: CD, LP, MC	—	—	—	—	—	—	94 (Note: Chart peak in 1994.)	—
Pastpresent	Released: 24 April 1989; Label: RCA; Formats: CD, LP, MC	—	29	—	4	—	1	5	—
Themes	Released: September 1992; Label: K-tel; Formats: CD	—	—	—	—	—	—	—	4 (Note: Chart peak upon release in the US in 1995.)
Rogha: The Best of Clannad	Released: 28 January 1997; Label: RCA; Formats: CD, MC	—	—	—	—	—	—	—	4
The Ultimate Collection	Released: 19 May 1997; Label: RCA; Formats: CD, MC; Deluxe edition released as In a Lifetime – The Ultimate Collection	17	—	—	21	—	—	46	—
The Celtic Voice	Released: 1997; Label: Celtic Collections, K-tel; Formats: CD; Reissued in 2001 as The Essential Clannad	—	—	—	—	—	—	—	—
An Díolaim	Released: 15 June 1998; Label: Music Club; Formats: CD, MC	—	—	—	—	—	—	—	—
Magic Elements – The Best of Clannad	Released: October 1998; Label: RCA; Formats: CD	—	—	45	—	—	—	—	—
Celtic Collection	Released: August 1999; Label: Camden; Formats: CD, MC	—	190	—	—	—	—	—	—
Greatest Hits	Released: January 2000; Label: RCA; Formats: CD, MC	—	—	—	—	—	—	—	—
A Magical Gathering: The Clannad Anthology	Released: 16 April 2002; Label: Rhino; Formats: 2xCD	—	—	—	—	—	—	—	—
The Best of Clannad: In a Lifetime	Released: 6 October 2003; Label: RCA; Formats: CD, 2xCD	30	—	—	79	—	—	23	5
The Only Clannad Album You'll Ever Need	Released: March 2005; Label: BMG; Formats: CD	—	—	—	—	—	—	—	—
Celtic Themes: The Very Best of Clannad	Released: 10 March 2008; Label: Sony BMG; Formats: CD	—	—	—	—	7	—	20	—
Beginnings: The Best of the Early Years	Released: August 2008; Label: Music Club Deluxe; Formats: 2xCD	—	—	—	—	—	—	—	—
The Essential Clannad	Released: 24 August 2012; Label: RCA/Sony Music; Formats: 2xCD	—	—	—	—	—	—	—	—
In a Lifetime	Released: 13 March 2020; Label: BMG; Formats: 2xCD, 2xLP, digital download	64	—	38	—	—	—	74	—
Rarities	Released: 16 September 2020; Label: BMG; Formats: digital download	—	—	—	—	—	—	—	—
"—" denotes releases that did not chart or were not released in that territory.

=== Box sets ===
Title	Album details
3 Originals	Released: 2002; Label: RCA; Formats: 3xCD
Original Album Classics	Released: 24 January 2011; Label: Sony Music/Legacy/RCA; Formats: 3xCD
The Real... Clannad	Released: 9 November 2018; Label: Sony Music/Legacy/BMG; Formats: 3xCD

=== Video albums ===
Title	Album details
Pastpresent	Released: 1989; Label: RCA/BMG Video; Formats: VHS, LD
Christ Church Cathedral	Released: 11 January 2013; Label: ARC Music; Formats: DVD

== EPs ==
Title	EP details	Peak chart positions
Title	EP details	UK
Robin (The Hooded Man)	Released: 20 April 1986; Label: RCA; Formats: 7"	80

== Singles ==
Title	Year	Peak chart positions									Album
Title	Year	IRE	AUS	BEL (FLA)	CAN	FIN	NL	NZ	SWE	UK	Album
"Dhéanainn Súgradh"	1974	—	—	—	—	—	—	—	—	—	Clannad 2
"An Bealach Seo 'tá Romhainn"	1975	—	—	—	—	—	—	—	—	—	Non-album single
"Down by the Sally Gardens" / "An Giobog"	1978	—	—	—	—	—	—	—	—	—	Clannad in Concert
"Mhorag's Na Horo Gheallaidh"	1981	—	—	—	—	—	—	—	—	—	Fuaim
"Theme from Harry's Game"	1982	2	—	—	—	—	18	—	16	5	Magical Ring
"I See Red"	1983	19	—	—	—	—	—	—	—	81	Magical Ring
"Newgrange"	1983	30	—	—	—	—	—	—	—	65	Magical Ring
"Robin (The Hooded Man)"	1984	19	—	—	—	—	—	36	—	42	Legend (soundtrack)
"Now Is Here"	1984	—	—	—	—	—	—	—	—	119	Legend (soundtrack)
"Scarlet Inside"	1985	—	—	—	—	—	—	—	—	108	Legend (soundtrack)
"Closer to Your Heart"	1985	—	—	—	—	—	—	—	—	110	Macalla
"Almost Seems (Too Late to Turn)"	1985	—	—	—	—	—	—	—	—	80	Macalla
"In a Lifetime" (featuring Bono)	1986	5	72	32	—	21	14	32	—	20	Macalla
"Something to Believe In" (featuring Bruce Hornsby)	1987	—	—	—	—	—	—	—	—	117	Sirius
"Live and Learn" (Canada and Germany-only release)	1988	—	—	—	—	—	—	—	—	—	Sirius
"White Fool"	1988	—	—	—	—	—	—	—	—	—	Sirius
"The Hunter"	1989	—	—	—	—	—	—	—	—	91	Pastpresent (Note: "Hourglass" was released to promote Pastpresent, but it does not actually feature on the album.)
"In a Lifetime" (reissue)	1989	25	166	—	—	—	—	32	—	17	Pastpresent
"Hourglass" / "Theme from Harry's Game"	1989	—	—	—	—	—	—	—	—	91	Pastpresent
"A Dream in the Night"	1989	—	—	—	—	—	—	—	—	—	The Angel and the Soldier Boy (soundtrack)
"In Fortune's Hand"	1990	—	—	—	—	—	65	—	—	80	Anam
"Why Worry?"	1991	—	—	—	—	—	—	—	—	—	Anam
"Both Sides Now" (with Paul Young)	1991	3	158	—	64	—	41	—	—	74	Switch (soundtrack)
"Theme from Harry's Game" (reissue) (Note: "Theme from Harry's Game" was reissued in 1992 after its use in the film Patriot Games. However, it became a hit in the Netherlands in 1993 after it was reissued there following it use in an advert for Jameson Irish Whiskey.)	1992	—	—	42	—	—	8	—	—	—	Patriot Games (soundtrack)
"Mystery Game"	1993	—	—	—	—	—	—	—	—	—	Banba
"Seanchas"	1996	—	—	—	—	—	—	—	—	—	Lore
"Christmas Angels"	1997	—	—	—	—	—	—	—	—	—	Non-album single
"An Gleann"	1998	—	—	—	—	—	—	—	—	—	Landmarks
"I Will Find You" (2002 remix; Antillas featuring Clannad)	2002	—	—	—	—	—	—	—	—	—	Non-album single
"Brave Enough" (featuring Duke Special)	2014	—	—	—	—	—	—	—	—	—	Nádúr
"Who Knows (Where the Time Goes)"	2020	—	—	—	—	—	—	—	—	—	In a Lifetime
"In a Lifetime" (featuring Denise Chaila)	2021	—	—	—	—	—	—	—	—	—	Non-album singles
"White Fool" (featuring Steve Perry)	2022	—	—	—	—	—	—	—	—	—	Non-album singles
"—" denotes releases that did not chart or were not released in that territory.
