= The Collection (Clannad album) =

Greatest hits album by Clannad
- Released: 1988
- Genre: Irish traditional music, folk, folk rock, Celtic, pop
- Label: K-tel Ireland

Clannad chronology
Sirius (1987)	The Collection (1988)	Atlantic Realm (1989)

The Collection is a greatest-hits anthology by Irish group Clannad, released in 1988 by K-tel. It consists of some of their more popular tracks dating back to 1972, with the tracks featuring a mix between their early folk and folk rock arrangements of Irish traditional music, and their later pop and Celtic new age songwriting. The CD version includes a comment on the back cover by Irish journalist Tommie Gorman stating: "freed at least by recognition, their creative instincts have found a new strength".

== Track listing ==
1. "Theme from Harry's Game"
2. "Closer to Your Heart"
3. "Lady Marian"
4. "Newgrange"
5. "Mhórag 'S Na Horo Gheallaidh"
6. "Níl Sé Ina Lá (Níl Sé'n Lá)"
7. "Caisleán Óir"
8. "In a Lifetime" (feat. Bono)
9. "Now Is Here"
10. "Na Buachaillí Álainn"
11. "Down by the Sally Gardens"
12. "Dúlamán"
13. "Robin (The Hooded Man)" (theme from Robin of Sherwood)
