= Themes (Clannad album) =

Greatest hits album by Clannad
- Released: 1992
- Genre: Folk
- Label: K-tel Ireland (1992); Celtic Heartbeat (1996); Atlantic (1996)

Clannad chronology
Anam (1990)	Themes (1992)	Banba (1994)

Professional ratings
Review scores
Source	Rating
Allmusic	3/5 stars
The Encyclopedia of Popular Music	3/5 stars

Themes is an greatest-hits anthology by the Irish music group Clannad. It was released 1992 on the K-tel Ireland label, and reissued more broadly, but with some track-list changes, in 1996 by Celtic Heartbeat Records (Universal) and by Atlantic Records.

== 1992 Track listing ==
1. "Both Sides Now" – 4:47
2. "Robin (The Hooded Man)" (theme from Robin of Sherwood) – 2:50
3. "Rí na Cruinne" – 4:02
4. "Ancient Forest" – 3:00
5. "Atlantic Realm" (theme from Natural World: Atlantic Realm) – 3:47
6. "Theme from Harry's Game" – 2:29
7. "Herne" – 5:10
8. "A Dream in the Night" – 3:09
9. "Lady Marian" – 3:23
10. "The Pirates / The Soldier Boy" – 2:16
11. "Voyager" – 3:19
12. "Drifting" – 1:53

== 1996 Track listing ==
1. "Both Sides Now" – 4:47
2. "Robin (The Hooded Man)" – 2:50
3. "Rí na Cruinne" – 4:02
4. "Ancient Forest" – 3:00
5. "Atlantic Realm" – 3:47
6. "Theme from Harry's Game" – 2:29
7. "Herne" – 5:10
8. "A Dream in the Night" – 3:09
9. "Lady Marian" – 3:23
10. "The Pirates / The Soldier Boy" – 2:16
11. "I Will Find You" – 5:17
12. "In a Lifetime" (duet with Bono) – 3:10
13. "Theme from The Dolphin Connection" – 3:17

== Charts ==
- USA, World Albums (1995): 4
