= Rogha: The Best of Clannad =

Greatest hits album by Clannad
- Released: 1996
- Genre: Folk rock, Celtic, pop
- Label: RCA Records / BMG

Clannad chronology
Lore (1996)	Rogha: The Best of Clannad (1996)	Landmarks (1997)

Rogha: The Best of Clannad is the fourth greatest-hits anthology released by Irish group Clannad. It was released in 1997 by BMG and its subsidiary RCA Records. The word rogha (Irish pronunciation: [ɾˠeː] RAY (in Ulster Irish) or [ˈɾˠəu(ə)] ROW-(ə) (elsewhere)) is the Irish word for 'choice'.

== Track listing ==
1. "Newgrange"
2. "Second Nature"
3. "Closer to Your Heart"
4. "Seachrán Charn tSiaill"
5. "Ancient Forest"
6. "Now Is Here"
7. "Something to Believe In"
8. "In Search of a Heart"
9. "Buachaill Ón Éirne"
10. "Northern Skyline"
11. "Together We"
12. "Tá 'Mé Mo Shuí"
13. "Blackstairs"
14. "Indoor"
15. "Thíos Fá'n Chósta"
16. "In a Lifetime" (duet with Bono)
17. "Theme from Harry's Game"
18. "The Fairy Queen"
19. "Journey's End"

== Reception ==
This release was somewhat duplicative of previous anthologies. A Celtic Roots reviewer hypothesized: "it's likely that the only reason Rogha exists at all is the fact that Clannad left RCA for Atlantic Records in the mid-'90s, leaving RCA to sift through the Clannad's leavings for material to put out one final release. ... The repetition of previous compilations is unfortunate, if understandable".
