= Clannad: Christ Church Cathedral =

Live album by Clannad
- Released: February 2012
- Venue: Christ Church Cathedral, Dublin
- Genre: Irish
- Label: ARC Music

Clannad chronology
Clannad: Live in Concert (2005)	Clannad: Christ Church Cathedral (2012)	Nádúr (2013)

Clannad: Christ Church Cathedral is a live album by Irish folk group Clannad which was released in 2012. It was recorded at Dublin's Christ Church Cathedral. The album and DVD features Riverdance singer Brian Kennedy and Irish choral group Anúna. A TV special of the concert was aired on American public television stations on February 27, 2012.

== Reception ==
The Living Tradition, in a positive review, praised the album's audio quality, Moya Brennan's vocals and the group's vocal harmonies. Cross Rhythms gave the album a rating of eight out of ten and said: "Overall, 'Christ Church Cathedral' is a testament to a superbly tight bunch of musicians while the guest string section add a grandeur to their epic soundscapes."

== Track listing ==
1. "Thíos Cois na Trá Domh"
2. "'dTigeas a Damhsa?"
3. "Crann Úll"
4. "Na Buachaillí Álainn"
5. "Eleanor Plunkett"
6. "'Mháire Bhruineall"
7. "Buachaill Ón Éirne"
8. "Newgrange"
9. "Éirigh 's Cuir Ort do Chuid Éadaigh"
10. "'Mhorag 's na Horo Gheallaidh"
11. "Robin of Sherwood"
12. "Caisleán Óir"
13. "In a Lifetime"
14. "I Will Find You"
15. "Theme from Harry's Game"
16. "Dúlamán"
17. "Down by the Salley Gardens"
18. "Níl Sé Ina Lá"
19. "Teidhir Abhaile Riú"

== Personnel ==
=== Clannad ===
- Clannad – Arranger, Main Performer
- Moya Brennan – Harp, Vocals
- Ciarán Brennan – Acoustic Guitar, Bass, Vocals, Keyboard, arranger
- Pádraig Duggan – Acoustic Guitar, Mandolin, Vocals
- Noel Duggan – Acoustic Guitar, Vocals
- Pól Brennan – guitar, whistles, vocals

=== Other musicians ===
- Brian Kennedy – vocals
- Anúna – choir
- Máire Breatnach – fiddle, viola, backing vocals
- Sinéad Madden – fiddle, backing vocals
- Jane Hughes – cello
- Robbie Harris – percussion
- Eamon de Barra – keyboards
- Ian Parker – additional instrumentation
- Liam Bradley – additional instrumentation

=== Production ===
- Liam McCarthy – lighting designer
- Andy Knightly – audio recording
- Ben Findlay – mixer
- Elaine McGuinnes – camera assistants
- Jason Keane – camera assistants
- Máirín Seoighe – production coordinator
- Joe Hoey – camera
- Kevin Cantrell – camera
- Michael O'Donovan – camera
- Fionn Mac Gilla Cuda – jib operator
- Áine Furlong – editor
- Grant Gravitt Jr. – editor
- Cathal Waters – producer / director
- Shane McDonnell – co-producer
- John Scher – executive producers
- Keith Naisbitt – executive producers
- Gustavo Sagastume – executive producers
- Carole Myers – executive producers

=== Tour crew ===
- Paddy McPoland – Tour manager
- Paul Ashe Brown – FOH audio
- Leon Brennan – Personnel manager
- Oisín Murray – Stage manager/backline tech
- Colin Sheehy – Backline tech
- Trevor McKenna – Location sound
- Ross Carew – Location sound
