= The Best of Clannad =

The Best of Clannad can refer to:

- Rogha: The Best of Clannad, a 1996 compilation album
- The Best of Clannad: In a Lifetime, a 2003 compilation album
- Magic Elements – The Best of Clannad, a 1998 compilation album, see Clannad discography
