= Clannad (disambiguation) =

Clannad is an Irish folk and Celtic musical group.

Clannad may also refer to:

- Clannad (album), an album by Clannad
- Clannad 2, an album by Clannad
- Clannad (video game), a Japanese visual novel
  - Clannad (film), a Japanese anime film based on the visual novel
