= Pastpresent =

1989 greatest hits album by Clannad

Greatest hits album by Clannad
- Released: 24 April 1989
- Length: 64:01
- Label: RCA / BMG
- Producers: Greg Ladanyi; Richard Dodd; Steve Nye; Tony Clarke; Russ Kunkel; Paul Brennan; Ciaran Brennan

Clannad chronology
Atlantic Realm (1989)	Pastpresent (1989)	The Angel and the Soldier Boy (1989)

Professional ratings
Review scores
Source	Rating
AllMusic	4.5/5 stars

Pastpresent is a greatest-hits anthology by Irish folk group Clannad, released in 1989. It is a collection of selected songs recorded by the band from 1982 up to 1989, including two new songs exclusive to this release (until their inclusion on the 2003 remastered edition of Sirius) – "The Hunter" and "World of Difference".

Three singles were released to promote the anthology: "The Hunter", "In a Lifetime" (re-issue) and the band's only double A-side "Hourglass"/"Theme from Harry's Game". However, "Hourglass" does not appear on this anthology and was only available as a single until it was included on the 2-disc 1997 Netherlands anthology In a Lifetime: The Ultimate Collection (BMG 74321 488072) and then again on the 2020 anthology In a Lifetime.

A book of sheet music for all songs except "Stepping Stone" was also produced.

The album cover includes a still image taken from the music video released for the single "The Hunter", as well as artwork from the Dutch artist M. C. Escher.

== Track listing ==
1. "Theme from Harry's Game" – 2:26
2. "Closer to Your Heart" – 3:28
3. "Almost Seems (Too Late to Turn)" – 4:48
4. "The Hunter" – 4:53
5. "Lady Marian" – 3:19
6. "Sirius" – 5:34
7. "Coinleach Glas an Fhómhair" – 5:56
8. "Second Nature" – 3:19 (not on vinyl album)
9. "World of Difference" – 4:00
10. "In a Lifetime" (duet with Bono) – 3:07
11. "Robin (The Hooded Man)" (theme from Robin of Sherwood) – 2:49
12. "Something to Believe In" – 4:44
13. "Newgrange" – 4:02
14. "Buachaill Ón Éirne" – 3:07
15. "White Fool" – 4:37
16. "Stepping Stone" – 3:52 (not on vinyl album)

== Charts and certifications ==
=== Weekly charts ===
Chart (1989)	Peak position
Australian Albums Chart	29
Dutch Albums Chart	4
New Zealand Albums Chart	1
UK Albums Chart	5

=== Certifications ===
Region	Certification	Certified units/sales
Australia (ARIA)	Platinum	70,000^{^}
United Kingdom (BPI)	Platinum	300,000^{^}
^{^} Shipments figures based on certification alone.

== Singles ==
1. "The Hunter"
2. "In a Lifetime" (1989 Re-release)
3. "Hourglass"/"Theme from Harry's Game" (Double A-Side)

== Book ==
Pastpresent
- Author: Clannad
- Language: English; Irish
- Publisher: Wise Publications
- Publication date: 1989
- Publication place: Ireland; United States; Germany
- ISBN: 0-711919-19-4
- OCLC: 65126191

Pastpresent is a sheet-music book, published to coincide with the album and video of the same name. The book provides sheet music for all songs from the album except "Stepping Stone". The book is now out of print. Credits in the books vary depending on the edition, of which there are two.

=== Chapters ===
1. "Theme from Harry's Game"
2. "Closer to Your Heart"
3. "Almost Seems (Too Late to Turn)"
4. "The Hunter"
5. "Lady Marian"
6. "Sirius"
7. "Coinleach Glas An Fhómhair"
8. "Second Nature"
9. "World of Difference"
10. "In a Lifetime" (a duet with Bono)
11. "Robin (The Hooded Man)"
12. "Something to Believe In"
13. "Newgrange"
14. "Buachaill Ón Éirne"
15. "White Fool"

== Video ==
Pastpresent
- Original cover
- Directed by: Various
- Produced by: Various
- Music by: Clannad
- Distributed by: RCA Records; BMG Records
- Release date: 1989
- Languages: Irish; English

Pastpresent was released on both VHS and LaserDisc. The video for Pastpresent is still widely available online, but has not been republished by the record companies involved.

=== Scenes ===
1. "Almost Seems (Too Late to Turn)" – opening sequence
2. "Harry's Game"
3. "An Mhaighdean Mhara"
4. "Closer to Your Heart"
5. "Something to Believe In"
6. "Teir Abhaile"
7. "Robin (The Hooded Man)"
8. "Newgrange"
9. "Hourglass"
10. "Buachaill Ón Éirne"
11. "The Hunter"
12. "In a Lifetime"
13. "Almost Seems (Too Late to Turn)" – closing sequence
- Times vary between scenes, with the closing credits on some United States versions of the video showing the full track "Almost Seems (Too Late to Turn)" at the end.
