= Ar a Ghabháil 'n a 'Chuain Domh =

Irish folk song

"Ar a Ghabháil Chun a Chuain Damh" (As I Went to the Harbour) is an Irish folk song. It is also known as "Béal Átha hAmhnais", which is the Irish name for the town of Ballyhaunis in County Mayo, Ireland.

The song has six verses and roughly follows common strophic form, although the melody of even-numbered verses differs slightly from the melody of odd-numbered verses. The song has a complex rhythmic structure with varying time signatures, and it has a vocal range of a minor tenth.

== Recorded versions ==
The song has been recorded several times by various artists. The following is an incomplete list of known recordings of the song.

- Aine Ni Ghallchobhair - Recording date unknown. Her recording contains vocals only. Original release by Gael-Linn Records between 1957 and 1961. Reissued in 1979 on a compilation album Na Ceirníní 78 1957-1960, and then in 2004 on another compilation album Seoltaí Séidte-Setting Sail.
- Na Filí - 1972, as Béal Atha h-Amhnais. From their third album Na Filí 3, released by Outlet in 1972 on vinyl, reissued in 1997 on CD. Their version includes whistle, fiddle and pipes accompaniment and interludes.
- Clannad - 1980, spelled Ar a Ghabhail 'n a 'Chuain Damh. Arguably the most famous recording of the song is the opening track on Clannad's 1980 album Crann Úll. Their version includes a lengthy outro/jam session containing both flute and guitar solos and a distinctive repeated riff played on a Wurlitzer electric piano. A different version can be found on the live album Turas (Live, 1980 Bremen), where it forms a medley with An Ghiobóg.
- Aoife - 1991, spelled Ar A Ghabhail 'n A Chuain Domh. Her version was released as the first track of her début album Loinneog Cheoil, and it follows a harmonic structure similar to the Clannad version.
- Maighread Ní Dhomhnaill, Tríona Ní Dhomhnaill and Dónal Lunny - 1999, spelled Ar a Ghabháil 'un a' Chuain Dom. Their version appeared on their 1999 album Idir an Dá Sholas. It contains a repeat of the first verse at the end.

== Clannad version ==
"Ar a Ghabháil 'n a 'Chuain Damh"

Song by Clannad

from the album Crann Úll
- Released: 1980
- Genre: Folk
- Length: 3:28
- Label: Tara Music label
- Songwriter: Irish traditional
- Producer: Nicky Ryan

- Ciarán Brennan - bass, backing vocals, Electric piano - (though uncredited, the keyboard part may have been provided by Enya, as she was a supporting member of Clannad during the recording of this and the next album).
- Máire Ní Bhronáin - vocals
- Pól Ó Braonáin - percussion, flute, backing vocals
- Noel Ó Dúgáin - Guitar, backing vocals
- Pádraig Ó Dúgáin - Guitar, backing vocals, mandolin
