= Celtic Themes: The Very Best of Clannad =

Greatest hits album by Clannad
- Released: 2008
- Genres: Folk rock, Celtic, pop
- Label: Sony BMG

Clannad chronology
| Clannad: Live in Concert (2008) | Celtic Themes: The Very Best of Clannad (2008) |

Professional ratings
Review scores
| Source | Rating |
|---|---|
| Allmusic | 3/5 stars |

Celtic Themes: The Very Best of Clannad is a greatest-hits anthology album by Irish group Clannad. It was released in early 2008 (on the Sony BMG label) to coincide with their UK reunion tour.

== Track listing ==
1. "Theme from Harry's Game"
2. "I Will Find You" (theme from The Last of the Mohicans)
3. "Robin (The Hooded Man)" (theme from Robin of Sherwood)
4. "In a Lifetime" (duet with Bono)
5. "Caislean Óir"
6. "Something to Believe In" (duet with Bruce Hornsby)
7. "A Bridge (That Carries Us Over)"
8. "Mystery Game"
9. "Almost Seems (Too Late to Turn)"
10. "Closer to Your Heart"
11. "Newgrange"
12. "Rí na Cruinne"
13. "The Hunter"
14. "Together We"
15. "Seanchas"
16. "Coinleach Glas an Fhómhair"
17. "A Mhuirnin Ó"
18. "Saltwater" by Chicane feat. Moya Brennan

== Charts ==
| Chart (2008) | Peak position |
|---|---|
| UK Albums Chart | 20 |
