= Nádúr =

Studio album by Clannad
- Released: 20 September 2013
- Recorded: Summer 2013
- Genres: Irish, folk, new-age
- Length: 50:51
- Label: ARC Music
- Producers: Ciarán Brennan, Pól Brennan

Clannad chronology
Clannad: Christ Church Cathedral (2012)	Nádúr (2013)

Nádúr (Irish for 'Nature') is the final studio album by Irish folk group Clannad, and was released digitally worldwide on 20 September 2013 and physically within the following week or two, depending on the country. It was the first new studio album since Landmarks in 1997, and the first to feature all five original members of Clannad since the compilation album Past Present in 1989. The release contains several songs in Irish Gaelic and one in Scottish Gaelic.

== Track listing ==
No.	Title	Writer(s)	Length
1.	"Vellum"	Ciarán Brennan; Martin Swords	4:47
2.	"Rhapsody na gCrann"	Ciarán Brennan; Pól Brennan; Cathal Ó Searcaigh	3:12
3.	"TransAtlantic"	Pól Brennan; Ciarán Brennan; Colum McCann	3:57
4.	"Turas Dhòmhsa Chon na Galldachd"	Traditional (Scottish Gaelic); arranged by Ciarán Brennan and Pól Brennan	3:02
5.	"Brave Enough"	Pól Brennan; Tara Byrne	4:12
6.	"The Fishing Blues"	Ciarán Brennan	3:19
7.	"Lámh ar Lámh"	Moya Brennan; Pól Brennan	3:43
8.	"Tobair an tSaoil"	Moya Brennan; Aisling Jarvis	3:33
9.	"The Song in Your Heart"	Moya Brennan; Aisling Jarvis	3:37
10.	"A Quiet Town"	Noel Duggan	3:15
11.	"Hymn (to Her Love)"	Ciarán Brennan	4:49
12.	"Setanta"	Pádraig Duggan	4:30
13.	"Cití na gCumann"	Traditional; arranged by Ciarán Brennan and Pól Brennan	4:55
14.	"River of Dreams [iTunes bonus track]"		4:02

== Singles ==
- "Vellum" (1-track promo) 2013
- "Brave Enough" (1-track promo) 2013
