= The Last of the Mohicans (soundtrack) =

Soundtrack album by Trevor Jones & Randy Edelman
- Released: 1992 (Reissued 2000)
- Genre: Film score
- Labels: Morgan Creek (1992); Varèse Sarabande (2000)

2000 Reissue
- Re-recording by the Royal Scottish National Orchestra

Professional ratings
Review scores
Source	Rating
AllMusic	4/5 stars

The Last of the Mohicans is the soundtrack album of the 1992 film of the same name.

== Credits ==
- Composers: Trevor Jones and Randy Edelman
- Orchestrator: Jack Smalley
- Conductor: Daniel A. Carlin and Randy Edelman
- Manufacturer: Morgan Creek
- Written by: Dougie MacLean

== Background ==
Director Michael Mann initially asked Trevor Jones to provide an electronic score for the film, but late in production, it was decided an orchestral score would be more appropriate for this historic epic. Jones hurried to re-fashion the score for orchestra in the limited time left, while the constant re-cutting of the film meant music cues sometimes had to be rewritten several times to keep up with the new timings.

Finally, with the release date looming, composer Randy Edelman was called in to score some minor scenes which Jones did not have time to do. Jones and Edelman received co-credit on the film (thus making the score ineligible for Oscar consideration).

The main theme of the movie is "Promentory", an orchestration of the tune "The Gael" by Scottish singer-songwriter Dougie MacLean from his 1990 album The Search.

== Rerecording in 2000 ==
The score was re-recorded and re-released in 2000 to address some perceived problems with its original incarnation. The tracks were reordered into their onscreen chronology (the original album separated the Jones material from that composed by Edelman), some additional cues were added, and Clannad's "I Will Find You" was no longer included.

== Commercial usage ==
Music from the track "Promentory" was used for a fall 2007 Nike television commercial featuring NFL players Shawne Merriman and Steven Jackson, also directed by Michael Mann.

== Track listing ==
=== 1992 ===
Tracks 1–9 are composed by Trevor Jones except for the main theme which is composed by Dougie MacLean; tracks 10–15 are by Randy Edelman.

1. "Main Title" – 1:44
2. "Elk Hunt" – 1:49
3. "The Kiss" – 2:47
4. "The Glade Part II" – 2:34
5. "Fort Battle" – 4:22
6. "Promentory" – 6:15
7. "Munro's Office/Stockade" – 2:30
8. "Massacre/Canoes" – 6:52
9. "Top of the World" – 2:43
10. "The Courier" – 2:27
11. "Cora" – 2:30
12. "Rival Walk and Discovery" – 5:30
13. "Parlay" – 3:46
14. "The British Arrival" – 2:00
15. "Pieces of a Story" – 4:58
16. "I Will Find You" (performed by Clannad) – 1:42

Note - There are three versions of "I Will Find You":

- The movie version includes only 9 lines in Mohican, English, and Cherokee.
- The 1992 1:42 soundtrack has 10 lines Mohican and English. It is not included in the 2000 soundtrack.
- Clannad did a 5:16 full version on their album Banba; it has 39 lines English, Mohican, and Cherokee.

=== 2000 ===
1. "Main Title" – 1:52
2. "Elk Hunt" – 1:50
3. "Bridge at Lacrosse" – 1:23
4. "Garden Scene" – 3:20
5. "Ambush" – 2:35
6. "The Glade" – 3:16
7. "Fort Battle" – 4:18
8. "The Courier" – 2:30
9. "The Kiss" – 2:49
10. "Stockade" – 2:47
11. "Massacre" – 6:54
12. "Ascent / Pursuit" – 3:06
13. "Promentory" – 5:38
14. "Top of the World" – 3:01

== Sales and certifications ==
Region	Certification	Certified units/sales
Spain (Promusicae)	Gold	50,000^{^}
United Kingdom (BPI)	Silver	60,000^{‡}
United States (RIAA)	Platinum	1,000,000^{^}
^{^} Shipments figures based on certification alone.^{‡} Sales+streaming figures based on certification alone.
