= The Best of Clannad: In a Lifetime =

2003 greatest hits album by Clannad

Greatest hits album by Clannad
- Released: 2003
- Genre: Folk rock, Celtic, pop
- Length: 75:19
- Label: RCA Records / BMG

Clannad chronology
A Magical Gathering: The Clannad Anthology (2003)	The Best of Clannad: In a Lifetime (2003)	Clannad: Live in Concert (2005)

Professional ratings
Review scores
Source	Rating
Allmusic	3/5 stars

The Best of Clannad: In a Lifetime is a greatest-hits anthology album by Irish group Clannad. It was released in 2003 by BMG and its subsidiary RCA Records. It contains two new tracks, "Christmas Angels" and "What Will I Do", the latter of which was used in the soundtrack of the Kevin Costner film Message in a Bottle. A limited-edition version included an eight-song bonus disc, Clannad Chilled.

== Charts ==
Chart (2003)	Peak position
Dutch Albums (Album Top 100)	79
Scottish Albums (OCC)	19
UK Albums (OCC)	23

Chart (2026)	Peak position
Irish Independent Albums (IRMA)	13

== Track listing ==
1. "In a Lifetime" (duet with Bono) 3:08
2. "Theme from Harry's Game" 2:30
3. "I Will Find You" (theme from The Last of the Mohicans) 5:15
4. "What Will I Do" 5:30
5. "Almost Seems (Too Late to Turn)" 4:45
6. "Both Sides Now" (duet with Paul Young) 4:42
7. "Robin (The Hooded Man)" (theme from Robin of Sherwood) 2:51
8. "Newgrange" 4:04
9. "Of This Land" 4:44
10. "Something to Believe In" (duet with Bruce Hornsby) 4:48
11. "Caisleán Óir" 2:08
12. "Trail of Tears" 5:15
13. "Rí na Cruinne" 4:00
14. "Buachaill Ón Éirne" 3:13
15. "Sirius" 5:35
16. "A Dream in the Night" 3:08
17. "Fadó" (with Ian Melrose, guitar) 5:18
18. "Christmas Angels" 4:16

== Clannad Chilled, limited-edition bonus disc ==
1. "Saltwater" (Mothership Mix) by Chicane feat. Moya Brennan
2. "Úirchill an Chreagáin"
3. "Croí Cróga"
4. "Na Laethe Bhí"
5. "Dobhar"
6. "Coinleach Glas an Fhómhair (Cantoma Mix)"
7. "Together We (Cantoma Mix)"
8. "Caisleán Óir (Planet Heaven Mix)"
