= Clannad (album) =

Studio album by Clannad
- Released: Aug. 1973
- Recorded: Eamonn Andrews Studios, Dublin, Ireland
- Genres: Irish traditional, folk, folk rock
- Length: 38:26 (41:08 with bonus track)
- Labels: Philips Ireland; Royal Records International
- Producer: John Cunan

Clannad chronology
Clannad (1973)	Clannad 2 (1974)

Clannad is the debut album by Irish group Clannad. It was released in 1973 by Philips Records Ireland. For the Canadian and some other markets, it was reissued in 1982 under the title The Pretty Maid. In 1997, it was released on CD for the first time by Royal Records International, again under the title Clannad, with a bonus track from 1975.

The album features songs in both Irish Gaelic and English, including a cover version of Bonnie Dobson's "Morning Dew", as well as many traditional Irish songs, in styles including folk acoustic, and folk rock with some jazz elements.

== Track listing ==
All tracks traditional, except where indicated.

1. "Níl Sé Ina Lá" (Note: Later, e.g. on live albums, given as "Níl Sé'n Lá".) – 4:50
2. "Thíos Cois na Trá Domh" – 2:55
3. "Brian Boru's March" – 3:50
4. "Siúbhán Ní Dhuibhir" – 4:30
5. "An Mhaighdean Mhara" – 2:10
6. "Liza" (Padraig Duggan, Pól Brennan) – 2:00
7. "An tOileán Úr" – 4:03
8. "Mrs. McDermott" (Turlough O'Carolan) – 3:03
9. "The Pretty Maid" – 2:40
10. "An Pháirc" (Mick Hanly) – 3:00
11. "Harvest Home" – 1:40
12. "Morning Dew" (Bonnie Dobson (Note: The album also credited Tim Rose as co-author of this song, as many did in that era after Rose claimed credit for it on his 1967 version; but a later lawsuit by Dawson established her as sole author.)) – 3:45

Bonus track

1. "An Bealach Seo 'tá Romham" – 2:42
