= In Fortune's Hand =

Single by Clannad

from the album Anam
- Released: October 1990
- Recorded: Windmill Studios, Dublin, Ireland
- Genre: Pop rock, New-age
- Length: 3:57
- Label: RCA
- Songwriter: Ciarán Brennan
- Producer: Steve Nye

Clannad singles chronology
"Hourglass" (1989)	"In Fortune's Hand" (1990)	"Why Worry?" (1991)

"In Fortune's Hand" is a single by Irish group Clannad. It was released in 1990 and was the first single released to promote their album Anam.

== Track listing ==
7" vinyl, 12" vinyl, cassette & 5" compact disc

1. "In Fortune's Hand"
2. "Dobhar"
3. "An Mhaighdean Mhara" (live)

== Charts ==
- UK: 80
- Dutch: 65
