= In a Lifetime (album) =

2020 compilation album by Clannad

Greatest hits album by Clannad
- Released: 2020
- Recorded: 1973–2020
- Genre: Irish traditional, folk, folk rock, Celtic, new age, pop, jazz
- Length: 144:00
- Label: BMG

Clannad chronology
Turas (2018)	In a Lifetime (2020)

In a Lifetime is a greatest-hits anthology album by Irish group Clannad. The album contains two new tracks, "A Celtic Dream" and "Who Knows (Where the Time Goes)", the first recorded by the group since the passing of member Pádraig Duggan. Released on 3 April 2020, the album was to coincide with the band's 50th anniversary as a group and they subsequently embarked on a world tour. The In a Lifetime tour was postponed due to the COVID-19 pandemic.

The cover art features the last four remaining members of Clannad sitting on a currach on the Clady River in their hometown of Gaoth Dobhair, County Donegal.

== Track listing ==
Disc 1

1. "Thíos Cois na Trá Domh" (3:05)
2. "An Mhaighdean Mhara" (2:13)
3. "Eleanor Plunkett" (2:46)
4. "Coinleach Ghlas an Fhómhair" (5:43)
5. "Dúlamán" (4:29)
6. "Two Sisters" (4:09)
7. "dTigeas a Damhsa?" (1:21)
8. "The Last Rose of Summer" (4:13)
9. "Ar a Ghabháil 'n a Chuain Damh" (3:25)
10. "Crann Úll" (3:40)
11. "Mheall Sí Lena Glórthaí Mé" (4:18)
12. "Mhórag 's na Horo Gheallaidh" (1:42)
13. "Theme from Harry's Game" (2:30)
14. "Newgrange" (4:03)
15. "Robin (The Hooded Man)" (theme from Robin of Sherwood) (2:45)
16. "Strange Land" (3:11)
17. "Closer to Your Heart" (3:27)
18. "In a Lifetime" feat. Bono (3:08)
19. "Almost Seems (Too Late to Turn)" (4:45)
20. "White Fool" feat. Steve Perry (4:42)
21. "Something to Believe In" feat. Bruce Hornsby (4:45)

Disc 2

1. "Atlantic Realm" (from Natural World: Atlantic Realm) (3:49)
2. "Voyager" (3:18)
3. "A Dream in the Night" (from The Angel and the Soldier Boy) (3:07)
4. "Hourglass" (4:19)
5. "Rí na Cruinne" (4:01)
6. "The Poison Glen" (3:55)
7. "Na Laethe Bhí" (5:21)
8. "I Will Find You" (theme from The Last of the Mohicans) (5:14)
9. "Croí Cróga" (4:59)
10. "A Bridge (That Carries Us Over)" (4:28)
11. "A Mhuirnín Ó" (4:54)
12. "The Bridge of Tears" (4:00)
13. "Vellum" (4:46)
14. "Brave Enough" feat. Duke Special (4:12)
15. "A Celtic Dream" (5:23)
16. "Who Knows (Where the Time Goes)" (4:16)

== Charts ==
Chart performance for In a Lifetime
Chart (2020)	Peak position
German Albums (Offizielle Top 100)	38
Portuguese Albums (AFP)	42
UK Albums (OCC)	74
