= The Hunter (Clannad song) =

Single by Clannad

from the album Past Present
- Released: 6 March 1989
- Recorded: Windmill Studios, Dublin, Ireland
- Genre: Pop rock, New-age
- Length: 4:10 [Radio edit] 4:57 [Album version]
- Label: RCA Records
- Songwriter(s): Pól Brennan, Ciarán Brennan

Clannad singles chronology
| "Almost Seems (Too Late To Turn)" | "The Hunter" | "In a Lifetime" |

"The Hunter" is a hit song by Irish group Clannad from 1989. It appears on their compilation album Past Present, and also on the 2003 remastered edition of Sirius. A promotional video for the single was directed by Nigel Grierson, using the radio edit of the song.

== Track listing ==
7" vinyl (PB 42609)

1. "The Hunter"
2. "Atlantic Realm"

12" vinyl (PT 42610)

1. "The Hunter"
2. "Atlantic Realm"
3. "Turning Tide"

5" compact disc (PD 42610)

1. "The Hunter - radio edit" (4:08)
2. "Skellig - single edit" (4:27)
3. "Turning Tide" (4:38)
4. "Atlantic Realm - single edit" (3:25)

The single reached number 91 in the UK charts in March 1989.
