= Crann Úll =

Studio album by Clannad
- Released: 1980
- Recorded: Conny's Studio, Köln, Germany; Engineers, Dave Hutchins, Conny Plank
- Genre: Folk
- Length: 31:41
- Label: Tara Music label
- Producer: Nicky Ryan

Clannad chronology
Clannad in Concert (1979)	Crann Úll (1980)	Fuaim (1982)

Eithne Ní Bhraonáin chronology
Crann Úll (1980)	Fuaim (1982)

Professional ratings
Review scores
Source	Rating
Allmusic	2.5/5 stars

Crann Úll is the fifth album by Irish folk group Clannad released in 1980. It is also the first Clannad album to feature younger sister Eithne Ní Bhraonáin (later known as Enya). She appears as supporting vocalist on the track "Gathering Mushrooms". The name of the album (and song on track 6) translates as 'Apple Tree'.

The album was remastered and reissued on 7 August 2020 in both compact disc and vinyl formats.

== Track listing ==
1. "Ar a Ghabháil 'n a 'Chuain Damh" – 3:28
2. "The Last Rose of Summer" – 4:17
3. "Crúiscín Lán" – 2:34
4. "Bacach Shíle Andaí" – 2:33
5. "Lá Coimhthíoch fán dTuath (A Strange Day in the Countryside)" – 3:49
6. "Crann Úll" – 3:44
7. "Gathering Mushrooms" – 2:40
8. "An Buinneán Buí" – 4:17
9. "Planxty Browne" – 4:13

== Personnel ==
=== Band ===
- Ciarán Ó Braonáin – bass, guitar, keyboards, vocals
- Máire Ní Bhraonáin – vocals, harp
- Pól Ó Braonáin – flute, guitar, percussion, vocals
- Noel Ó Dúgáin – guitar, vocals
- Pádraig Ó Dúgáin – guitar, mandolin, vocals

=== Additional musicians ===
- Eithne Ní Bhraonáin (Enya) – percussion, keyboards, backing vocals

=== Production ===
- Dave Hutchins – recording engineer
- Conny Plank - recording engineer
- Brian Masterson – mixing
- Bill Giolando – mastering
- Nicky Ryan – producer
