= Macalla =

- Macalla was Clannad's first internationally successful album.

Studio album by Clannad
- Released: 14 October 1985
- Recorded: Power Play, Zurich, Switzerland; Ridge Farm, Surrey, England; Windmill Lane, Dublin, Ireland
- Genre: Folk
- Length: 37:11
- Label: RCA
- Producer: Steve Nye

Clannad chronology
| Legend (1984) | Macalla (1985) | Sirius (1987) |

Singles from Macalla
- 1. "Closer to Your Heart" Released: September 1985; 2. "Almost Seems (Too Late to Turn)" Released: November 1985; 3. "In a Lifetime" Released: January 1986

Professional ratings
Review scores
| Source | Rating |
|---|---|
| Allmusic | 4.5/5 stars |

Macalla is a 1985 musical album by the Irish folk group Clannad. It is their eighth album and is known for the duet between Clannad's singer Moya Brennan and U2 vocalist Bono on the single "In a Lifetime". An alternate version of the album's first track, "Caisleán Óir", was used throughout the third Robin of Sherwood series.

The album's title is Irish for "echo". Two of its songs are sung entirely in Irish: "Caisleán Óir", which translates as "golden castle", and "Buachaill Ón Éirne", which means "Boy from the Erne".

== Track listing ==
1. "Caisleán Óir" (Ciarán Brennan, Máire Brennan) – 2:06
2. "The Wild Cry" (Pól Brennan) – 4:41
3. "Closer to Your Heart" (C. Brennan) – 3:29
4. "In a Lifetime" (a duet with Bono) (C. Brennan, P. Brennan) – 3:08
5. "Almost Seems (Too Late to Turn)" (P. Brennan) – 4:51
6. "Indoor" (P. Brennan) – 3:53
7. "Buachaill ón Éirne" (Traditional) – 3:08
8. "Blackstairs" (P. Brennan) – 4:15
9. "Journey's End" (Noel Duggan, Pádraig Duggan) – 2:42
10. "Northern Skyline" (C. Brennan, P. Brennan) – 4:58
11. "Caisleán Óir (Planet Heaven Mix)" – 7:04 (bonus track available only on 2003 Deluxe Edition)

== Personnel ==
=== Band ===
- Ciarán Ó Braonáin – bass, guitar, keyboards, vocals
- Máire Ní Bhronáin – vocals, harp
- Pól Ó Braonáin – flute, guitar, percussion, vocals
- Noel Ó Dúgáin – guitar, vocals
- Pádraig Ó Dúgáin – guitar, mandolin, vocals

=== Additional Musicians ===
- Bono – vocals
- Mel Collins – saxophone
- Danny Cummings – percussion
- James Delaney – keyboards, synthesizer
- Anto Drennan – guitar, electric guitar
- Paul Moran – drums
- Steve Nye – keyboards

=== Production ===
- Steve Nye – producer
- Louis Austin – engineer
- Justin Birt – assistant engineer
- Ron Kurz – engineer
- Martin Pearson – assistant engineer
- Kevin Maloney – engineer
- John Grimes – assistant engineer
- Kevin Metcalfe – mastering
- Anton Corbijn – photography
- Jill Furmanovsky – photography

=== Additional information ===
- Engineered by Martin Pearson and Ron Kurz (Power Play Studio)
- Engineered by Louis Austin (Ridge Farm Studio), Assistant engineer - Justin Birt
- Engineered by Kevin Maloney (Windmill Lane Studio), Assistant engineer - John Grimes
- Mixed at Windmill Lane Studio
- Mastered at Townhouse Studios by Kevin Metcalfe
- Sleeve direction by Mainartery
- Photography - Jill Furmanovsky
- Clannad photography by Anton Corbijn

== Charts ==
| Chart (1986) | Peak position |
|---|---|
| U.S Billboard 200 | 131 |
| UK Albums Chart | 33 |
