= Leo's Tavern =

Pub and music venue in County Donegal, Ireland

Coordinates: 55.027357°N 8.271192°W

Leo's Tavern Tábhairne Leo

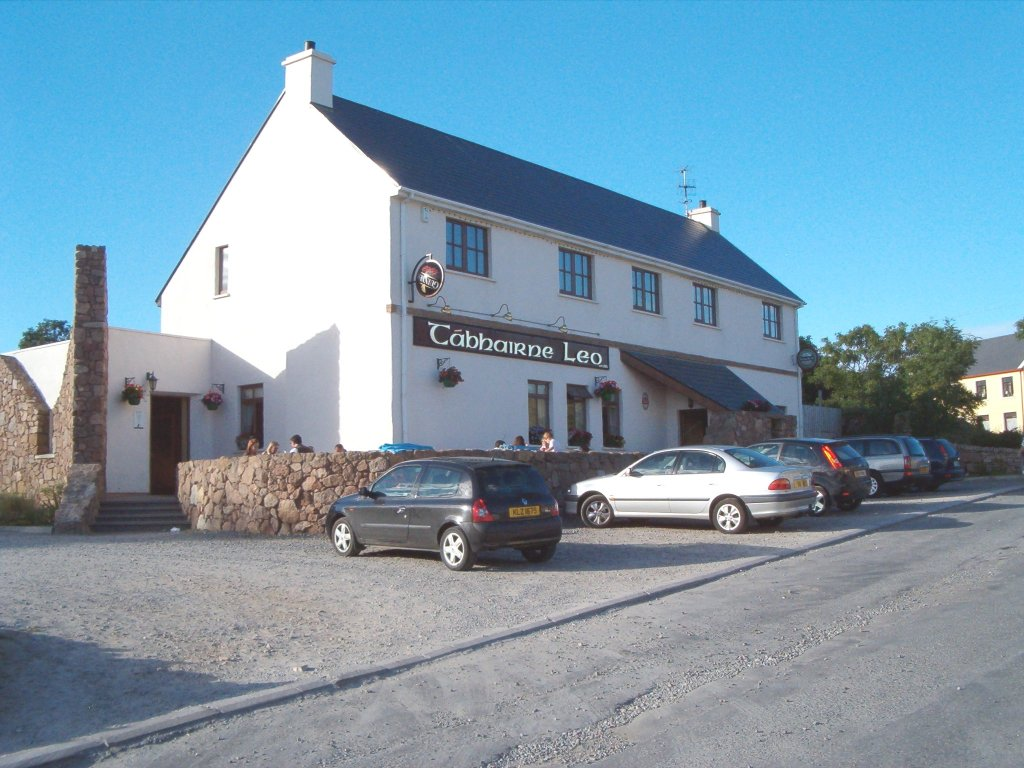
- Leo's Tavern in 2005
- Interactive map of Leo's Tavern; Tábhairne Leo

Restaurant information
- Established: 1968
- Owners: Leo Brennan (founder); Bartley Brennan (proprietor)
- Food type: Irish traditional, European
- Location: Meenaleck, Crolly, Gweedore, Donegal, Ireland
- Other information: Pub, music venue, tourist attraction
- Website: www.leostavern.com

Leo's Tavern (Irish: Tábhairne Leo) is a pub in the Donegal Gaeltacht, known as the home of music artists Clannad, Enya and Moya Brennan. It serves food and is a music venue. The pub opened in 1968 and held Irish traditional music sessions nightly, becoming the musical starting block for the children of Leo Brennan, the pub's founder.

== History ==
=== Origins and development ===
At the end of Ireland's showband era, musician Leo Ó Braonáin settled with his wife Máire "Baba", opening Tábhairne Leo in 1968. The pub became a gathering place for musicians and singers to take part in Irish traditional music sessions. While working shifts behind the bar, Leo's children Máire (Moya), Ciarán, Pól Ó Braonáin, Noel, and Pádraig Ó Dúgáin would accompany their father on stage to tell old Irish stories, or seanchas, to the locals. While touring in later years as Celtic/Folk band Clannad, the siblings, their uncles, and their younger siblings Brídín, Eithne (Enya), Olive, and Deirdre would perform.

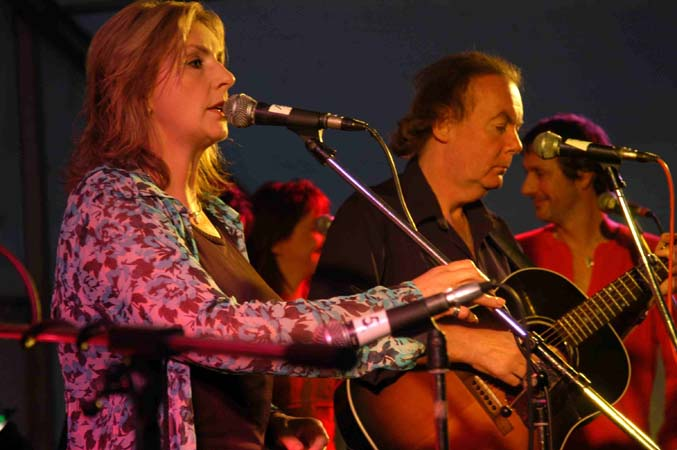
Clannad performing in Leo's in 2005.

The pub has also hosted guests and performers such as Bono, The Edge, Paul Brady, Christy Moore, Mairéad Ní Mhaonaigh and Mary Black. Tour buses of tourists began to visit the pub to hear Leo sing and tell stories.

The pub was renovated in 2002, and now also has a food offering and features Gold, Platinum and Diamond discs and memorabilia associated with Clannad, Moya and Enya on its walls.

=== Concerts ===
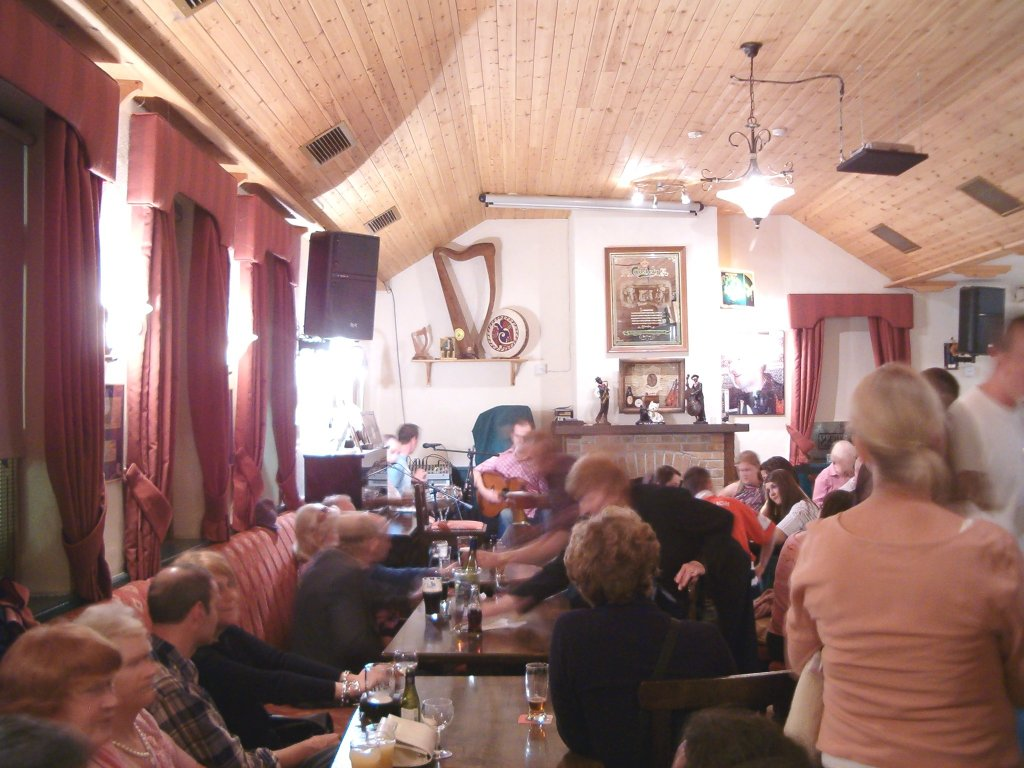
Interior of Leo's Tavern, 2005

The tavern was celebrated during the 2005 Errigal Arts Festival, at which Leo and Baba Brennan were awarded the Freedom of Donegal by Donegal County Council. The ceremony, held on 14 July 2005, was preceded by a series of concerts called Oidhreacht (Irish for Legacy). These concerts featured Leo and Baba's daughters performing at St. Mary's Church in Derrybeg. A jazz concert was also held, with some of these events being broadcast on TG4 and RTÉ Television.

Leo's Tavern marked its 40th anniversary in 2008 and held a three-day celebration. A concert was held, featuring music from Leo Brennan, Clannad, Brídín Brennan, Deirdre Brennan, Mairéad Ní Mhaonaigh and Manus Lunny.

Leo Brennan died on 22 June 2016, aged 90.
