= Clannad in Concert =

Live album by Clannad
- Released: 1979
- Recorded: 1978 Swiss tour
- Genre: Folk
- Length: 33:01
- Label: Ogham Records
- Producer: Nicky Ryan

Clannad chronology
Dúlamán (1976)	Clannad in Concert (1979)	Crann Úll (1980)

Professional ratings
Review scores
Source	Rating
Allmusic	3/5 stars

Clannad in Concert is the first live album by Irish folk band Clannad, released in 1979 by Ogham Records. It was recorded at unknown location during their 1978 tour of Switzerland, during which the group decided to continue with the band full time. The LP came in a gatefold cover and early copies of the Irish issue included a large poster.

== Track listing ==
1. "Bean an Tí (Ó Bhean an Tí)" – 3:00
2. "Fairies Hornpipe/Off to California" – 3:20
3. "A Neansaí Mhíle Grá" – 4:45
4. "Mháire Bhruineall" – 1:08
5. "Planxty Burke" – 3:42
6. "An Giobóg" – 2:10
7. "Down by the Sally Gardens" – 4:36
8. "Níl Sé Ina Lá (Níl Sé'n Lá)" – 10:20

== Personnel ==
=== Band ===
- Ciarán Ó Braonáin – bass, guitar, keyboards, vocals, piano (electric), mandolin
- Máire Ní Bhraonáin – vocals, harp
- Pól Ó Braonáin – flute, guitar, percussion, bongos, vocals, whistles, human whistle
- Noel Ó Dúgáin – guitar, vocals
- Pádraig Ó Dúgáin – guitar, mandola, mandolin, vocals

=== Production ===
- Nicky Ryan – producer, engineer
