= Dúlamán (album) =

Studio album by Clannad
- Released: 1976
- Recorded: Rockfield, Monmouth, Wales
- Genre: Folk
- Length: 38:43
- Label: Gael Linn
- Producer: Nicky Ryan

Clannad chronology
Clannad 2 (1974)	Dúlamán (1976)	Clannad in Concert (1979)

Professional ratings
Review scores
Source	Rating
Allmusic	3/5 stars

Dúlamán (Irish pronunciation: [ˈd̪ˠuːlˠəmˠaːnˠ]; 'Seaweed') is the third studio album by Irish folk group Clannad. It was released in 1976. It is named after its first track, a rendition of the Irish folk song "Dúlamán".

The songs "Siúil a Rúin" and "Cucanandy" (traditionally also known as "The Whistling Thief") are inspired by recordings of Elizabeth Cronin (Eibhlís Uí Chróinín).

== Influence ==
Minneapolis Celtic-rock band Boiled in Lead was inspired to take its name from Clannad's version of Irish murder ballad "Two Sisters".

== Track listing ==
1. "Dúlamán" – 4:34
2. "Cumha Eoghain Rua Uí Néill" – 4:09
3. "Two Sisters" – 4:13
4. "Éirigh Suas a Stóirín" – 5:14
5. "The Galtee Hunt" – 3:09
6. "Éirigh Is Cuir Ort do Chuid Éadaigh" – 4:12
7. "Siúil a Rúin" – 5:50
8. "Mo Mháire" – 2:43
9. "dTigeas a Damhsa" – 1:26
10. "Cucanandy / The Jug of Brown Ale" – 3:13

== Personnel ==
=== Band ===
- Ciarán Ó Braonáin – bass, guitar, keyboards, vocals, piano (electric), mandolin
- Máire Ní Bhronáin – vocals, harp
- Pól Ó Braonáin – flute, guitar, percussion, bongos, vocals, whistles, human whistle
- Noel Ó Dúgáin – guitar, vocals
- Pádraig Ó Dúgáin – guitar, mandola, mandolin, vocals

=== Additional musicians ===
- Nicky Ryan – backing vocals

=== Production ===
- Fritz Fryer – engineer
- Bill Giolando – mastering
- Nicky Ryan – producer
- Joachim Boske – sleeve design
- Bill Doyle – photography
- Manjit Jari – photography
