= Clannad 2 =

Studio album by Clannad
- Released: 1974
- Recorded: Eamonn Andrews, Dublin, Ireland
- Genre: Irish traditional, folk, folk rock
- Length: 42:15
- Label: Gael Linn
- Producer: Dónal Lunny

Clannad chronology
Clannad (1973)	Clannad 2 (1974)	Dúlamán (1976)

Professional ratings
Review scores
Source	Rating
Allmusic	4/5 stars

Clannad 2 is the second studio album by Irish group Clannad, released in 1974 on Gael Linn Records. The album is primarily Irish traditional music, in both Irish Gaelic and English, delivered in the band's early style: a mixture of folk acoustic, folk rock, and some jazz influences. However, it also included a Scottish Gaelic waulking song, "Dhèanainn Sùgradh", as well as their arrangement of an instrumental Breton folk dance, "Rince Briotánach (Gavoten ar Menez)".

== Track listing ==
1. "An Gabhar Bán (The White Goat)" – 3:15
2. "Eleanor Plunkett" (Turlough O'Carolan) – 2:49
3. "Coinleach Ghlas an Fhómhair" – 5:46
4. "Rince Philib a' Cheoil" – 1:51
5. "By Chance It Was" – 5:41
6. "Rince Briotánach (Gavoten ar Menez)" – 3:14
7. "Dhèanainn Sùgradh" – 5:39
8. "Gaoth Barra na dTonn" – 2:33
9. "Teidhir Abhaile Riú" – 2:48
10. "Fairly Shot of Her" – 2:21
11. "Chuaigh Mé 'na Rosann" – 6:18

== Singles ==
1. "Dhèanainn Sùgradh"

== Personnel ==
=== Band ===
- Ciarán Ó Braonáin – bass, guitar, keyboards, vocals
- Máire Ní Bhraonáin – vocals, harp
- Pól Ó Braonáin – flute, guitar, percussion, vocals
- Noel Ó Dúgáin – guitar, vocals
- Pádraig Ó Dúgáin – guitar, mandolin, vocals

=== Additional musicians ===
- Robbie Ó Braonáin – drums
- Tríona Ní Dhomhnaill – keyboards
- Mícheál Ó Domhnaill – guitar, vocals
- Dónal Lunny – synthesizer, guitar, percussion
- Pádraig Ó Domhnaill – Vocals

=== Production ===
- Donal Lunny - producer
- Philip Begley – engineer
- Bill Bolger – sleeve design
- Bill Giolando – mastering
