= Eleanor Plunkett =

Irish folk tune

Eleanor Plunkett is a traditional air composed by the Irish harper/songwriter Turlough O'Carolan, (1670–1738). Originally a song in Irish Gaelic written in praise of Eleanor Plunkett of Robertstown, County Meath. The G major tune is in triple meter.

The tune was in the repertoire of 18th Century Irish harpist Donnchadh Ó hAmhsaigh. Irish music researcher Simon Chadwick, who says "Eleanor Plunkett has become a standard in the contemporary tradition," identified the tune in the notebooks and publications of 19th Century folk song collector Edward Bunting. The lyrics were published in 1916 by Tomás Ó Máille, a professor of Irish at University College Galway. Australian folk tune collector Michael Field includes it in his O'Carolan tunebook with the note: "One of the most popular compositions by blind Irish harper Turlough O'Carolan".

== Background ==
The tune commemorates Eleanor Burke, wife of Robert Plunkett of Robberstown, near Nobber, County Meath, one of Turlough O'Carolan's patrons. According to local tradition recorded by folklorist Séamus Mac Gabhann, O'Carolan composed the tune after visiting the family. Eleanor's family had long been associated with Ardamagh in County Meath, where the Burkes held the local castle until the Cromwellian conquest of Ireland. The castle was subsequently destroyed, members of the Burke family were killed, and the Plunketts, as Catholics, also forfeited their lands during the Cromwellian plantations .

Mac Gabhann argues that these associations help explain why the melody became linked with Ardamagh in local tradition. He suggests that O'Carolan's choice of Eleanor as the subject of the composition reflected not only her personal qualities but also her symbolic connection with the surrounding landscape and its folklore. In this interpretation, the tune became part of the cultural identity of the Ardamagh area, illustrating how O'Carolan's music could preserve local historical memory alongside personal commemoration.

== Legacy ==
The tune has continued to circulate in the modern Irish traditional repertoire through recordings and published settings, and has been described as among O'Carolan's best-known composititons. Early revival recordings include Clannad's arrangement on Clannad 2. Later interpretations include those by Máire Ní Chathasaigh and Chris Newman on The Carolan Albums, Déanta on Ready for the Storm, Mícheál Ó Súilleabháin on Between Worlds, William Coulter on The Crooked Road, and Órla Fallon on Distant Shore.
