= Anam (album) =

- Original 1990 album cover

Studio album by Clannad
- Released: 8 October 1990
- Recorded: Woodtown Manor, Dublin; Woolhall Studios, Beckington, England
- Genre: Folk
- Label: RCA
- Producer: Ciarán Brennan

Clannad chronology
The Angel and the Soldier Boy (1989)	Anam (1990)	Banba (1992)

Alternative cover
- 1992 US release cover

Alternative cover
- 2004 Reissue album cover

Professional ratings
Review scores
Source	Rating
Allmusic	3/5 stars

Anam is a 1990 album by Irish folk group Clannad. Anam is an Irish language noun meaning soul.

== Track listing ==
1. "Rí na Cruinne" (Ciarán Brennan, Máire Brennan, Noel Duggan, Pádraig Duggan) – 4:03
2. "Anam" (C. Brennan, Leo Brennan) – 4:03
3. "In Fortune's Hand" (C. Brennan) – 3:55
4. "The Poison Glen" (C. Brennan, M. Brennan, N. Duggan, P. Duggan) – 3:55
5. "Wilderness" (instrumental) (C. Brennan) – 2:07
6. "Why Worry?" (C. Brennan) – 4:29
7. "Úirchill an Chreagáin" (Traditional) – 4:24
8. "Love and Affection" (C. Brennan) – 4:59
9. "You're the One" (C. Brennan, M. Brennan) – 3:55
10. "Dobhar" (instrumental) (C. Brennan) – 2:40

The 1992 USA release featured two bonus tracks: "In a Lifetime" (a duet with Bono) was included as the second track after "Rí na Cruinne", and "Harry's Game (From the Motion Picture Patriot Games)" was inserted between "Wilderness" and "Why Worry?" as the seventh track.

A 2005 reissue featured one bonus track: "Rí na Cruinne" (Lazyboy Mix), with a runtime of 4:45.

== Singles ==
1. "In Fortune's Hand"
2. "Why Worry?"
