= Lore (Clannad album) =

Studio album by Clannad
- Released: March 1996
- Genres: Folk, new-age
- Label: Atlantic
- Producers: Ciarán Brennan (tracks: 1 to 3, 5, 7 to 9, 11), Denis Woods, Hugh Padgham (tracks: 1 to 4, 6, 8, 10)

Clannad chronology
| Banba (1993) | Lore (1996) | Landmarks (1997) |

Singles from Lore
- 1. "Seanchas" Released: 1996

Professional ratings
Review scores
| Source | Rating |
|---|---|
| AllMusic | 4/5 stars |

Lore is a 1996 studio album by the Irish folk group Clannad. It was re-issued in 2005 with the bonus track "Croí Cróga (Cantoma Mix)". Lore was greeted with great acclaim by music critics worldwide, often stating that this was one of Clannad's greatest recordings. This has the most Irish Gaelic songs of all Clannad albums since 1982, and was nominated for a Grammy Award for Best New Age Album, the band's second nomination, although it lost to The Memory of Trees by Enya (Eithne Ní Bhraonaín), who was once a member of Clannad and is the sister of band members Moya Brennan, Ciarán Brennan and Pól Brennan as well as niece to Noel Ó Dúgáin and Pádraig Ó Dúgáin.

== Track listing ==
1. "Croí Cróga" (Ciarán Brennan) – 5:00
2. "Seanchas" (C. Brennan) – 4:56
3. "A Bridge (That Carries Us Over)" (C. Brennan) – 4:32
4. "From Your Heart" (Máire Brennan) – 5:14
5. "Alasdair MacColla" (Traditional; in Scottish Gaelic) – 2:13
6. "Broken Pieces" (M. Brennan) – 4:53
7. "Tráthnóna Beag Aréir" (Traditional) – 6:38
8. "Trail of Tears" (Noel Duggan) – 5:17
9. "Dealramh Go Deo" (C. Brennan) – 5:05
10. "Farewell Love" (M. Brennan) – 4:44
11. "Fonn Mhárta" (C. Brennan) – 3:32
12. "Croí Cróga" (Cantoma Mix) (only on 2005 reissue album) – 5:58

== Charts ==
| Chart (1996) | Peak position |
|---|---|
| U.S Billboard Top World Albums | 1 |
| UK Albums Chart | 14 |
