= Fuaim =

Studio album by Clannad
- Released: 1982 (re-released 1993, 2020)
- Recorded: Windmill Lane Studios, Dublin, Ireland
- Genres: Irish traditional, folk, folk rock
- Length: 34:54
- Labels: Tara (1982, 2020); Atlantic (1993, deleted)
- Producer: Nicky Ryan

Clannad chronology
Crann Úll (1980)	Fuaim (1982)	Magical Ring (1983)

Eithne Ní Bhraonáin chronology
Crann Úll (1980)	Fuaim (1982)	The Frog Prince: The Original Soundtrack Recording (1985)

Professional ratings
Review scores
Source	Rating
Allmusic	4/5 stars

Fuaim (Irish Gaelic for 'Sound') is the sixth album by Irish group Clannad. It was released in 1982 by Tara Records, and produced by Nicky Ryan. Like their other early material, it is primarily Irish traditional music in a modern-folk and folk rock arrangement with some jazz elements.

It was the second and last Clannad album to feature younger sister Eithne Ní Bhraonáin, later known as Enya, and the only one to credit her; while she performed keyboard and backing vocals on the previous album Crann Úll, she was uncredited on it. She departed the band, along with producer Ryan, shortly thereafter to begin a solo career.

The album was reissued for a short time by Atlantic Records starting in 1993. It has since been remastered and reissued on 7 August 2020 in both compact disc and vinyl formats, on the Tara label.

== Track listing ==
1. "Na Buachaillí Álainn" – 2:57
2. "Mheall Sí Lena Glórthaí Mé" – 4:17
3. "Bruach na Carraige Báine" – 2:37
4. "Lá Breá Fán dTuath" – 0:45
5. "An tÚll" – 3:07
6. "Strayed Away" – 2:46
7. "Ní Lá na Gaoithe Lá na Scoilb?" – 6:11
8. "Lish Young Buy-a-Broom" – 3:30
9. "Mhòrag 's na Horo Gheallaidh" – 1:43
10. "The Green Fields of Gaothdobhair" – 4:09
11. "Buaireadh an Phósta" – 2:52

== Singles ==
1. "Mhòrag 'S Na Horo Gheallaidh"

This track is unusual, for Clannad's repertoire, in being in Scottish Gaelic rather than Irish; it is a traditional Scottish waulking song, according to the album's liner notes.

== Personnel ==
=== Band ===
- Ciarán Ó Braonáin (Ciarán Brennan) – bass, guitar, keyboards, vocals
- Máire Ní Bhraonáin (Moya Brennan) – vocals, harp
- Pól Ó Braonáin (Pól Brennan) – flute, guitar, percussion, vocals
- Noel Ó Dúgáin (Noel Duggan) – guitar, vocals
- Pádraig Ó Dúgáin (Pádraig Duggan) – guitar, mandolin, vocals
- Eithne Ní Bhraonáin (Enya) – percussion, keyboards, vocals

=== Additional musicians ===
- Neil Buckley – clarinet, saxophones
- Noel Bridgeman – percussion
- Pat O'Farrell – electric guitar

=== Production ===
- Brian Masterson – engineer
- Pearce Dunne – assistant engineer
- Clannad – liner notes
- Paul Wexler – liner notes
- Nicky Ryan – producer
