= The Angel and the Soldier Boy =

Soundtrack album by Clannad
- Released: 11 December 1989
- Studio: Woodtown Manor; Windmill Lane, Dublin, Ireland
- Genre: Soundtrack
- Length: 51:25
- Label: BMG Records (UK) LTD
- Producer: Ciarán Brennan and Paul Ridout

Clannad chronology
Past Present (1989)	The Angel and the Soldier Boy (1989)	Anam (1990)

The Angel and the Soldier Boy is the 13th album by Irish folk group Clannad, released in 1989. It is the soundtrack to the animated movie of the same name and contains both the music to the movie and the narration of the story by Tom Conti. The animation is based on the award-winning children's picture book by Peter Collington.

== Track listing ==
1. Music from the Soundtrack: – 25:28
  - "A Dream in the Night (Theme from The Angel and the Soldier Boy)"
  - "The Pirates"
  - "The Soldier Boy"
  - "The Angel"
  - "The Flies"
  - "The Spider"
  - "The Cat"
  - "The Jolly Roger"
  - "Into the Picture"
  - "Pirates Merrymaking"
  - "Finding the Key"
  - "Pirates on the Island"
  - "Sea and Storm"
  - "The Love Theme"
  - "The Chase"
  - "The Toys"
  - "The Rescue"
  - "Back to the Book"
  - "A Dream in the Night (Instrumental)"
2. The Story Narrated by Tom Conti – 26:00

== Singles ==
1. "A Dream in the Night"
