= Brian Boru's March =

Traditional Irish song

Brian Boru's March
Performed by the U.S. Marine Band.

Brian Boru's March
Performed on piano.

Brian Boru's March is a traditional Irish tune.

Brian Boru was a High King of Ireland who founded the O'Brien dynasty.

In 1842, a version of the song was published by Dublin Monthly Magazine. In 1969, the song was recorded by The Chieftains. Horslips used it in 1976, as the intro and basis for "Trouble (With a Capital T)" from the album The Book of Invasions.
