= Atlantic Realm =

Studio album by Clannad
- Released: 1989
- Recorded: Windmill Lane, Dublin, Ireland; Real World, Bath, England
- Genre: Soundtrack, new age
- Length: 33:33
- Label: BBC (1989), BMG Records (1996)
- Producer: Pól Brennan and Ciarán Brennan

Clannad chronology
Sirius (1987)	Atlantic Realm (1989)	Past Present (1989)

Atlantic Realm is the 11th album by Irish group Clannad, released in 1989. It is the soundtrack to the BBC television series Natural World: Atlantic Realm, a documentary about the Atlantic Ocean.

The album was rated two out of five stars by AllMusic.

== Track listing ==
1. "Atlantic Realm" – 3:49
2. "Predator" – 3:05
3. "Moving Thru" – 3:10
4. "The Berbers" – 1:17
5. "Signs of Life" – 2:04^{*}
6. "In Flight" – 3:07
7. "Ocean of Light" – 3:30
8. "Drifting" – 1:53
9. "Under Neptune's Cape" – 3:19
10. "Voyager" – 3:19
11. "Primeval Sun" – 1:09
12. "Child of the Sea" – 2:40
13. "The Kirk Pride" – 1:19
^{*} This track includes samples of narration from the TV show as well as Clannad's music for it.

== Charts ==
Chart (1989)	Peak position
UK Albums Chart	41
