= Banba (album) =

- Original 1993 album cover

Studio album by Clannad
- Released: 3 May 1993
- Genre: Folk, New-age music
- Label: Atlantic
- Producer: Ciarán Brennan

Clannad chronology
Anam (1990)	Banba (1993)	Lore (1996)

Alternative cover
- 2005 Reissue album cover

Professional ratings
Review scores
Source	Rating
Allmusic	3/5 stars

Banba is an album released by Irish folk group Clannad in 1993 on BMG records. It was re-issued in 2005 with the Afterlife mix bonus track of "I Will Find You". Banba was nominated for a Grammy Award for Best New Age Album, but was the runner-up to Spanish Angel by Paul Winter Consort.

Reaching a UK chart position of number five, it is Clannad's most commercially successful studio album in the United Kingdom.

== Track listing ==
1. "Na Laethe Bhí" –- 5:20
2. "Banba Óir" – 3:26
3. "There for You" – 4:10
4. "Mystery Game" – 4:24
5. "Struggle" – 4:04
6. "I Will Find You" (Theme from the 1992 film The Last of the Mohicans) – 5:16
7. "Soul Searcher" – 4:25
8. "Caidé Sin do'n Té Sin" – 4:22
9. "The Other Side" – 4:18
10. "Sunset Dreams" – 4:12
11. "A Gentle Place" (instrumental) – 3:11
12. "I Will Find You" (Afterlife Mix) (only on 2005 reissue album) – 3:40

== Charts ==
Chart (1993)	Peak position
U.S Billboard Top World Albums	1
U.S Billboard 200	110
UK Album Chart	5

== Singles ==
1. "Mystery Game"

== Credits ==
- All songs were written by Ciarán Brennan except "Sunset Dreams" by Noel Duggan.
- Produced by Ciarán Brennan.
- Frankie Kennedy appears as a guest musician on flute.
- The album sleeve was designed and art directed by Bill Smith Studio with photography by Anton Corbijn.

== Certifications and sales ==
Region	Certification	Certified units/sales
United States (RIAA)	Gold	349,000
