= Down by the Salley Gardens =

Poem by William Butler Yeats

"Down by the Salley Gardens"
Performed by Celtic Aire of the United States Air Force Band

"Down by the Salley Gardens" (Irish: Gort na Saileán) is a poem by William Butler Yeats published in The Wanderings of Oisin and Other Poems in 1889.

== History ==
Yeats indicated in a note that it was "an attempt to reconstruct an old song from three lines imperfectly remembered by an old peasant woman in the village of Ballisodare, County Sligo, who often sings them to herself." The "old song" may have been the ballad "The Rambling Boys of Pleasure" which contains the following verse:

Down by yon flowery garden my love and I we first did meet.
I took her in my arms and to her I gave kisses sweet
She bade me take life easy just as the leaves fall from the tree.
But I being young and foolish, with my darling did not agree.

The similarity to the first verse of the Yeats version is unmistakable and would suggest that this was indeed the song Yeats remembered the old woman singing. The rest of the song, however, is quite different.

Yeats's original title, "An Old Song Re-Sung", reflected his debt to "The Rambling Boys of Pleasure". The poem first appeared under its present title when it was reprinted in Poems in 1895.

== Poem ==
Down by the salley gardens my love and I did meet;
She passed the salley gardens with little snow-white feet.
She bid me take love easy, as the leaves grow on the tree;
But I, being young and foolish, with her would not agree.

In a field by the river my love and I did stand,
And on my leaning shoulder she laid her snow-white hand.
She bid me take life easy, as the grass grows on the weirs;
But I was young and foolish, and now am full of tears.

== Location ==
It has been suggested that the location of the "Salley Gardens" was on the banks of the river at Ballysadare near Sligo where the residents cultivated trees to provide roof thatching materials. "Salley" or "sally" is a form of the Standard English word "sallow", i.e., a willow tree of the genus Salix. It is close in sound to the Irish word saileach, which also means willow.

== Musical settings ==
The verse was set to music by Herbert Hughes to the traditional air "The Maids of Mourne Shore" in 1909. In the 1920s composer Rebecca Clarke (1886–1979) set the text to her own music. The composer John Ireland (1879–1962) set the words to an original melody in his song cycle Songs Sacred and Profane, written in 1929–31. There is also a vocal setting by the poet and composer Ivor Gurney, which was published in 1938. Benjamin Britten published a setting of the poem in 1943, using the tune Hughes collected. In 1988, the American composer John Corigliano wrote and published his setting.

Hughes' setting is recorded by individuals and groups including:

- John McCormack (1941)
- Peter Pears, with piano accompaniment by Britten (1944)
- Kathleen Ferrier (1949)
- Alfred Deller (1958)
- Kenneth McKellar (1960)
- Marianne Faithfull (on Come My Way, 1965)
- Clannad on multiple albums including Clannad in Concert (1979)
- Courage of Lassie on Sing or Die (1990)
- Maura O'Connell and Karen Matheson for Transatlantic Sessions 2 (1998)
- The Rankin Family on Collection (1996)
- Órla Fallon on The Water is Wide (2000)
- Andreas Scholl on Wayfaring Stranger (2001)
- Redbird on Redbird (2003)
- Méav Ní Mhaolchatha on A Celtic Journey (2006)
- Sissel Kyrkjebø on Into Paradise (2006)
- The Waterboys on Room to Roam – Collectors Edition (2008)
- Loreena McKennitt on The Wind That Shakes the Barley (2010)
- Laura Wright on The Last Rose (2011)
- Alexander Armstrong on A Year of Songs (2015)

Additionally, the same setting is sung in the films Dancing at Lughnasa (1998) and The Children Act (2017), as well as in the anime series Fractale (2011) as the ending theme.

== See also ==
- 1889 in poetry
- List of works by William Butler Yeats
- Down in the Willow Garden, a traditional folk song with similar lyrics
