= Eamonn Andrews Studios =

Eamonn Andrews Studios was founded by broadcaster Eamonn Andrews, famous for being the presenter with the big red book of This Is Your Life, a British television programme. In the 1960s, the launch of television in Ireland led him to become the Chairman of the RTÉ Authority. He set up a media production company in Ireland, the Eamonn Andrews Studios, which ran a dance hall called The Television Club in Harcourt Street in Dublin and took on the lease of the Gaiety Theatre in Dublin.

Eamonn Andrews Studios were originally located at 40 Henry Street. In the 1960s the company bought the TV Club building on Harcourt Street. It was located directly opposite, what was then, the Old Harcourt Street Station. It housed two distinctly different studios. A radio studio which recorded sponsored programmes for Radio Éireann, and commercials, and a band studio down stairs. It used the dance hall during the day to record all the main bands of the Showband era. At nighttime, the bands were showcased live on stage in what the company called The Mecca of Irish Nightlife.

The company bought number 45, the adjoining Georgian Building, and moved the band recording operation to the 2nd floor. The studio was equipped with a 1-inch, 8-track Ampex recorder, and mastered down onto a Studer quarter-inch machine. It boasted Fairchild limiters, Dolby noise reduction, JBL Monitors, and the second mixing desk ever made by Neve. Mics were Neumann U 87, and AKG. It also had a Bechstein grand piano, and a mini-Moog synthesiser. It was Ireland's first multitrack studio. The band studio burned down in the late 1970s, and never reopened in the face of the stiff competition that had arisen in Dublin.

Some bands, notably U2, used the small radio studio to record demos for some time afterwards.

The company directors were Fred O'Donovan, Dermot Cafferky, Lorcan Burke, and Eamonn Andrews. General manager was Tom Walsh. Studio manager was Jimmy Potter. Notable Sound Engineers across both studios were Darby Carroll, Conor O'Loughlin, Pat Morley, Philip Begley, Brian Masterson, Finín O Ceallachain, Trevor Clynch, and David Freeley, Dave Meegan
