= Sirius (Clannad album) =

Studio album by Clannad
- Released: 26 October 1987
- Recorded: 25 April – 20 July 1987
- Studios: Woodtown Manor (Dublin); Rockfield (Rockfield, Wales); Livingston (London, England); Angel (London, England)
- Genre: Folk
- Length: 42:25
- Label: RCA
- Producers: Greg Ladanyi and Russ Kunkel

Clannad chronology
Macalla (1985)	Sirius (1987)	Atlantic Realm (1989)

Professional ratings
Review scores
Source	Rating
Allmusic	2/5 stars

Sirius is the tenth album by Irish folk group Clannad, released in 1987. It features several guest artists such as Bruce Hornsby, Steve Perry and JD Souther.

Perry, who performed on the song "White Fool", sang some of the vocals in Irish Gaelic at the suggestion of the members of Clannad. As Moya Brennan recounted, "Steve was recording near us when we met him. His ancestors come from Portugal, and their accent sounds very much like Gaelic. When we suggested he sing in Gaelic, he was very excited." When discussing the album, Brennan recalled that the band encountered some criticism from people living in England for working with American producers on Sirius.

== Cover ==
The cover of Sirius shows Brennan with the rest of Clannad standing beside a waterfall on the River Crolly in their hometown of Gweedore (Gaoth Dobhair).

== Reception ==
Billboard believed that the influence of Greg Ladanyi and Russ Kunkel as producers resulted in an album that pivoted away from Celtic folk music. They felt that the band resembled "Heart with a brogue" throughout the album and said that the two tracks with Hornsby demonstrated "some commercial promise". Ty Burr at Spin wrote, "The production runs thick and deep, and that’s both good and bad. The effect is like a beautiful antique table that some schmoe decided to cover with three layers of Lucite varnish. I mean, I like this album, but it took me about ten listens to get past the production and figure that out."

== Track listing ==
1. "In Search of a Heart" (Pól Brennan) – 3:53
2. "Second Nature" (Ciarán Brennan) – 3:20
3. "Turning Tide" (P. Brennan) – 4:39
4. "Skellig" (C. Brennan) – 4:46
5. "Stepping Stone" (P. Brennan) – 3:53
6. "White Fool" - feat. Steve Perry (P. Brennan) – 4:38
7. "Something to Believe In" - Duet with Bruce Hornsby (C. Brennan) – 4:47
8. "Live and Learn" (C. Brennan) – 3:32
9. "Many Roads" (C. Brennan) – 3:25
10. "Sirius" (P. Brennan) – 5:33

2003 re-master bonus tracks

11. "The Hunter" – 4:08 (single version) [original album version on the compilation Pastpresent]

12. "World of Difference" – 4:01 [from the compilation Pastpresent]

== Charts ==
Chart (1987–1988)	Peak position
Canada Top Albums/CDs (RPM)	84
Dutch Albums (Album Top 100)	45
US Billboard 200	183
UK Albums (Official Charts)	34
