= Landmarks (Clannad album) =

Studio album by Clannad
- Released: 3 March 1998
- Genre: New-age, folk
- Label: RCA
- Producer: Ciarán Brennan

Clannad chronology
Lore (1996)	Landmarks (1998)	An Díolaim (1998)

Professional ratings
Review scores
Source	Rating
Allmusic	4/5 stars

Landmarks is a studio album by Irish folk group Clannad. It was released in March 1998. A remastered recording was released 22 February 2005, by RCA Records. It includes a remix of "An Gleann" by Cantoma.

Landmarks garnered Clannad their first ever Grammy Award at the 1999 awards, for Best New Age Album, after two previous nominations.

== Track listing ==
1. "An Gleann" – (Ciarán Brennan) — 4:50
2. "Fadó" – (Padraig Duggan) — 5:17
3. "A Mhuirnín Ó" – (C. Brennan, Máire Brennan) — 4:59
4. "Of This Land" – (M. Brennan) — 4:45
5. "Court to Love" – (C. Brennan) — 3:51
6. "Golden Ball" (Instrumental) – (C. Brennan) — 4:02
7. "The Bridge of Tears" – (Noel Duggan) — 4:00
8. "Autumn Leaves Are Falling" – (C. Brennan) — 3:48
9. "Let Me See" – (M. Brennan) — 5:06
10. "Loch na Caillí" (Instrumental) – (C. Brennan) — 3:08

Bonus tracks on the 2005 reissue

11. "An Gleann" (Cantoma Mix) — (C. Brennan) – 6:53

== Personnel ==
Clannad

- Máire Brennan — lead vocals, keyboards, harp
- Noel Duggan — acoustic guitar; vocals (track 7)
- Padraig Duggan — mandolin
- Ciarán Brennan — bass, vocals, keyboards, acoustic guitar, mandolin; piano (track 10)

Additional personnel

- John McSherry — low whistle (track 4), uilleann pipes (track 4)
- Mel Collins — soprano saxophone (track 6), tenor saxophone (track 8)
- Vinnie Kilduff — whistle (track 6)
- David Downes — uilleann pipes (track 7)
- Ciaran Toorish — violin (track 5)
- Anthony Drennan — Spanish guitar (tracks 1, 4, 10), slide guitar (track 1), electric guitar (tracks 3, 5, 7, 8), acoustic guitar (track 3, 8)
- Ian Melrose — acoustic guitar (tracks 2, 3, 5–8), low whistle (track 2), electric guitar (track 8)
- Deirdre Brennan — bodhrán (track 4, 9)
- Ian Parker — keyboards (tracks 4–9), piano (track 6, 8)
- Paul Moran — drums (track 5, 7, 8), percussion (track 9)

== Charts ==
Chart (1998)	Peak position
U.S Billboard Top World Albums	6
UK Albums Chart	34

== Singles ==
1. "An Gleann"
