= Almost Seems (Too Late to Turn) =

Single by Clannad

from the album Macalla
- Released: 18 November 1985
- Studio: Windmill, Dublin, Ireland
- Genre: Pop rock, New-age
- Length: 4:47 (album version); 4:26 (radio edit)
- Label: BMG
- Songwriter: Pól Brennan
- Producer: Steve Nye

Clannad singles chronology
"Closer to Your Heart" (1985)	"Almost Seems (Too Late to Turn)" (1985)	"In a Lifetime" (1986)

"Almost Seems (Too Late to Turn)" is a 1985 single by Irish group Clannad. It is the second single from their album Macalla.

The song was used as the official Children in Need charity single for 1985. The song reached number 80 in the UK Singles Chart.

== Track listing ==
7-inch single

1. Almost Seems (Too Late to Turn) [radio edit]
2. Journey's End

12-inch single

1. Almost Seems (Too Late to Turn)
2. Theme from Harry's Game
3. Journey's End
4. Robin (The Hooded Man)
