= Closer to Your Heart (Clannad song) =

Single by Clannad

from the album Macalla
- Released: 16 September 1985
- Studio: Windmill, Dublin, Ireland
- Genre: Pop rock
- Length: 3:30
- Label: RCA
- Songwriter(s): Ciarán Brennan
- Producer(s): Steve Nye

Clannad singles chronology
"Scarlet Inside" (1984)	"Closer to Your Heart" (1985)	"Almost Seems (Too Late to Turn)" (1985)

"Closer to Your Heart" is a song by Irish folk rock group Clannad. It was Clannad's first single that was solely considered as pop music.

Parts of the video for the single were shot at the Ponderosa venue on Glenshane Pass near Derry.

== Track listing ==
1. "Closer to Your Heart"
2. "Buachaill Ón Éirne"
