= Theme from Harry's Game =

- Original 7" cover

Single by Clannad

from the album Magical Ring
- Language: Irish
- Written: 1982
- Released: October 1982
- Studio: Windmill (Dublin)
- Genre: Celtic; new-age
- Length: 2:30
- Label: RCA
- Songwriters: Pól Brennan; Ciarán Brennan (Note: The song is credited solely to Paul Brennan (Pól Ó Braonáin) in the liner notes of various recordings from 1982 to 1995, and to Paul and Ciarán in liner notes from 2003 and later. According to Moya Brennan, it was written "mainly" by Paul and Ciarán, with some input from her.)
- Producer: Richard Dodd

Clannad singles chronology
"Strayed Away" (1981)	"Theme from Harry's Game" (1982)	"I See Red" (1982)

Audio sample
- file; help

Music video
- "Theme from Harry's Game" on YouTube

1993 Dutch single cover

"Theme from Harry's Game" is a 1982 song by Clannad commissioned as the theme for Harry's Game, a Yorkshire Television miniseries adapted from a 1975 novel set in the Troubles in Northern Ireland. It was released as a single in October 1982 and became a surprise hit, reaching number 5 in the UK Singles Chart the following month and number 2 in the Irish Singles Chart.

== Composition ==
The song was written "in a couple of hours", credited to Pól and Ciarán Brennan. Gerald Seymour, author of Harry's Game, originally wanted to use "Mhorag 's Na Horo Gheallaidh", a Scottish Gaelic song from Clannad's album Fuaim, but Clannad felt Irish-language lyrics would be more appropriate. The verse is adapted from a Connacht Irish proverb in a 1948 anthology, (Note: The original is: Imeoidh an seanfhear atá cráite liath, Imeoidh an fhuiseog is áilne ar an gcraoibh, Imeoidh an duine óg is a cháil ina dhiaidh Imeoidh a dtiocfaidh is a dtáinig ariamh. A literal translation to English is: The old man, grey with torment, will go, The most beautiful skylark on the branch will go, The young man will go, and his reputation will follow him, All that ever will come and has come will go.) glossed by Máire (Moya) Brennan as "Everything that is and was will cease to be." This was considered appropriate to the miniseries' depiction of the futility of political violence.

The song is to date the only British hit single ever to have been sung entirely in Irish. The chorus "Fol lol the doh fol the day, Fol the doh fol the day", is ancient Irish mouth-music, known as Portaireacht, which is common in traditional music.

Over previous albums, Clannad's sound had moved away from traditional Irish music arrangements, and the production of "Theme from Harry's Game", using lush slow layers of synthesiser and vocal harmony, marked the arrival of what would become their signature style for the next decade. The vocal harmonies on "Theme from Harry's Game" were multitracked without the use of sampling. Ciarán Brennan commented that the band "put all our vocals on all the channels. Myself and Richard [Dodd] and my brother Pol just faded them up."

== Reception ==
The song won an Ivor Novello award, and launched Clannad's global career. Its success delayed the release of the band's 1983 album Magical Ring, which was altered to include it and more material in the same style.

It has since appeared in several Hollywood movies, most notably Patriot Games, in which an IRA member, played by Patrick Bergin, is seen watching the music video for the song on his television.

Clannad's 1990 album Anam was released in the United States in 1992 to capitalise on the Patriot Games exposure, with "Harry's Game" inserted in the tracklist; the album sold well and the track was often broadcast on VH1. Its use from late 1992 in a Volkswagen Passat commercial introduced Clannad to a broader American audience and boosted sales of Anam.

The song also features on Clannad's vocalists' live albums, the 2005 album Óró - A Live Session and the 2008 Moya Brennan solo album Heart Strings. The original has also been sampled various times by artists such as Kaleef and Elate. Moya Brennan recorded a solo version at Mothership Studio for dance musician Chicane, which he used on his UK top 10 hit "Saltwater."

After singer Moya Brennan's death in April 2026, the song debuted at number 18 on the UK Singles Downloads Chart.

== Track listing ==
1. "Theme from Harry's Game" – 2:30
2. "Strayed Away" – 2:47

== Charts ==
=== Weekly charts ===
Chart (1982–1984)	Peak position
Ireland (IRMA)	2
Netherlands (Dutch Top 40)	15
Netherlands (Single Top 100)	18
Sweden (Sverigetopplistan)	16
UK Singles (Official Charts)	5

Chart (1993)	Peak position
Belgium (Ultratop 50 Flanders)	42
Netherlands (Dutch Top 40)	9
Netherlands (Single Top 100)	8

Chart (2026)	Peak position
UK Singles Downloads Chart	18

=== Year-end charts ===
Chart (1993)	Position
Netherlands (Dutch Top 40)	76
Netherlands (Single Top 100)	95

== 1989 Theme from Harry's Game / Hourglass AA-side ==
In 1989, as part of the promotion for their compilation Pastpresent, Clannad re-released the "Theme from Harry's Game" as an AA-side single with their new song "Hourglass."

== 1992 Patriot Games re-release ==
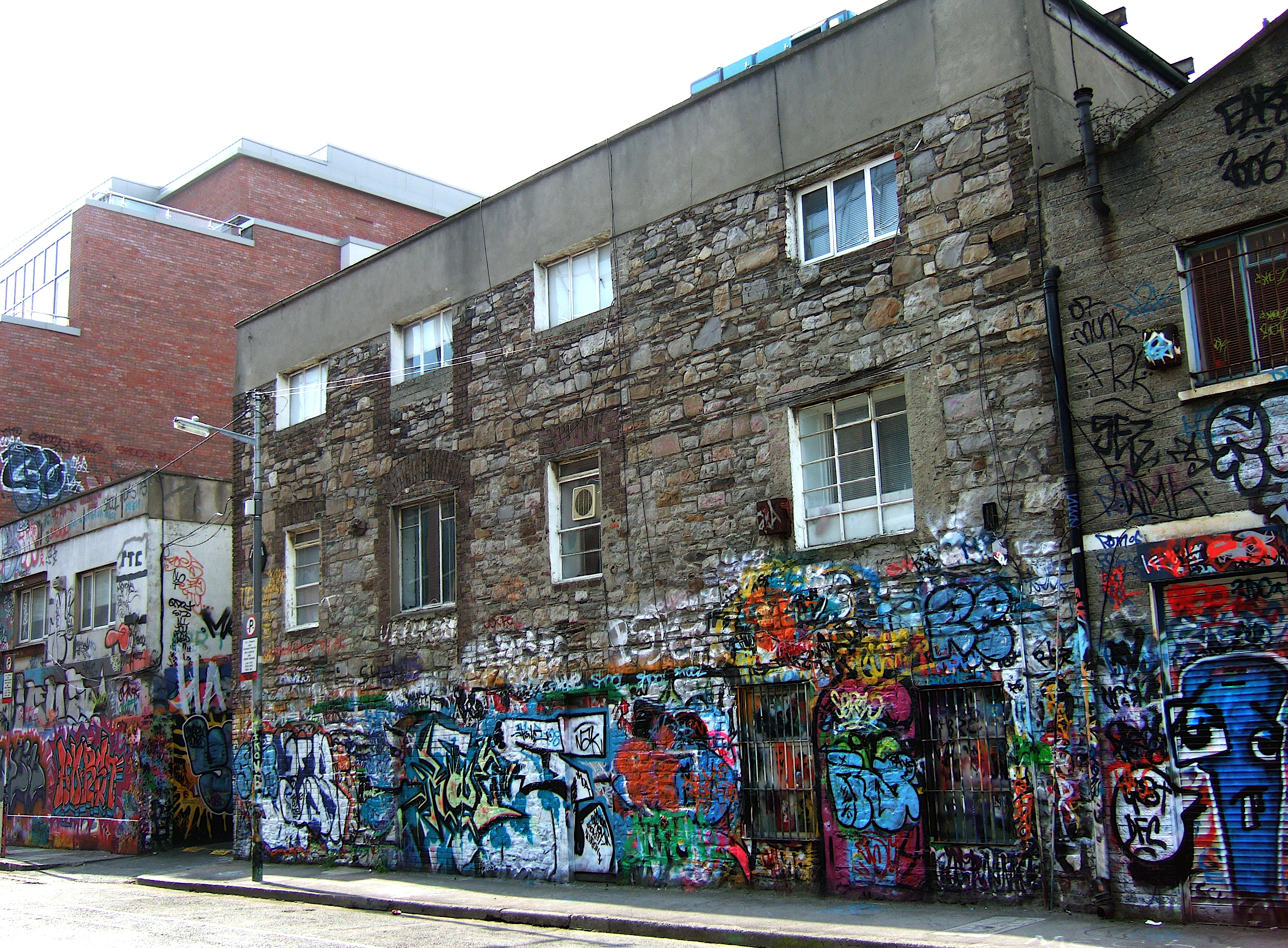
The song was recorded at Windmill Lane Studios in Dublin.

In 1992, the "Theme from Harry's Game" was used in the soundtrack to the film Patriot Games, and it was also re-released as a single on 21 September that year. There were two versions of the CD single, a two-track and a four-track version, both with the same cover and catalogue number.

=== Track listing ===
7" single, cassette, 5" compact disc

1. "Theme from Harry's Game"
2. "Robin (The Hooded Man)"

5" compact disc

1. "Theme from Harry's Game"
2. "Robin (The Hooded Man)"
3. "In a Lifetime"
4. "Closer to your Heart"

== 1993 Jameson Whiskey re-release ==
In 1993, in connection with an advertising campaign for Jameson Whiskey, both "Theme from Harry's Game" and "In A Lifetime" were re-released in The Netherlands.

=== Track listing ===
1. "Theme from Harry's Game"
2. "Caisleán Óir"

== Cover versions and other use ==
The song has been covered by artists including Phil Coulter and Celtic Woman. The Irish rock band U2 also used the song as their outro during the War Tour, and it can be heard as such at the beginning and end of their live film U2 Live at Red Rocks: Under a Blood Red Sky. It has also been used extensively by the RAF for the decommissioning flypasts of the Avro Vulcan Delta wing bomber, and subsequently in memorial flights at airshows.

- 1986 – Light Shadows
- 1993 – Phil Coulter on Recollections
- 1996 – The game Civilization II features that music as the soundtrack of "The Oracle" wonder of the world
- 1997 – Phil Coulter and James Galway on Legends
- 1999 – Chicane on Saltwater
- 2005 – Órla Fallon, then of Celtic Woman, on Celtic Woman (album)
- 2009 – Ron van den Beuken feat. Nicole Tyler on Faraway
- 2009/2011 – Dierdre Shannon on Celtic Thunder: Storm (the album was recorded in 2009 but released in 2011)
- 2019 – Voces8 on Enchanted Isle
- 2022 – Daithí on Irish Songbook: Vol 1
- 2022 – LN-6 on Theme from Harry's Game
