= Clannad =

Irish folk band

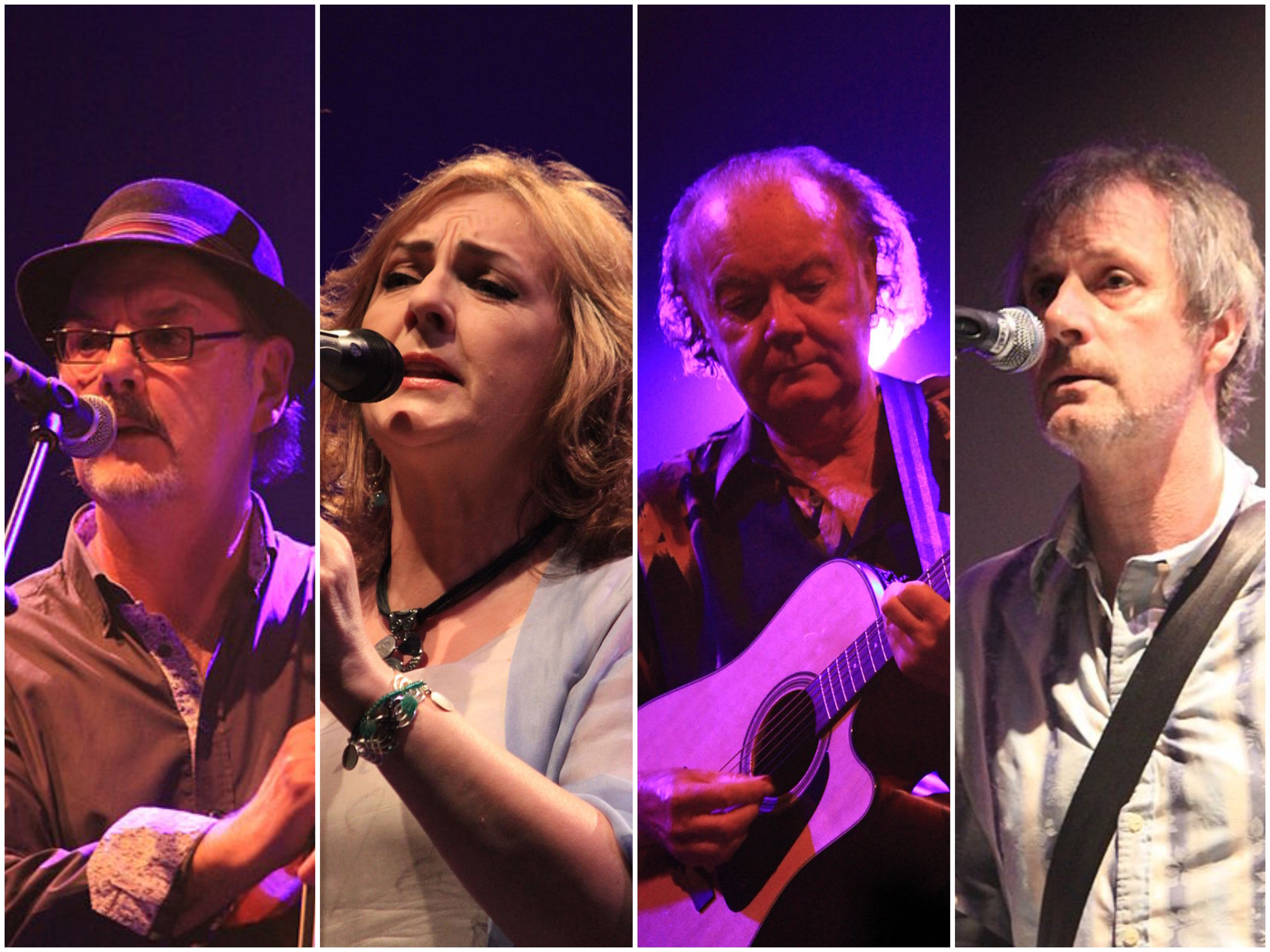
- Most recent line-up: Ciarán Brennan, Moya Brennan, Noel Duggan, Pól Brennan

Background information
- Origin: Gweedore, County Donegal, Ireland
- Genres: Irish traditional; folk; folk rock; Celtic; new age; pop
- Years active: 1970–2024, 2026
- Labels: Philips; Gael-Linn; Tara; RCA (BMG); BBC; Atlantic; ARC Music
- Spinoffs: The Duggans (duo)
- Members: Ciarán Brennan; Pól Brennan
- Past members: Pádraig Duggan; Noel Duggan; Moya (Máire) Brennan; Enya (Eithne Brennan); Brídín Brennan; Deirdre Brennan
- Website: Official website

Clannad (Irish pronunciation: [ˈklˠan̪ˠəd̪ˠ]) were an Irish band formed in 1970 in Gweedore, County Donegal, by siblings Ciarán, Pól, and Máire (Moya) Uí Bhraonáin (Note: Uí is plural and induces lenition on the following consonant. The masculine singular (without lenition) is Ó, and feminine (with lenition) is Ní, e.g. Ciarán Ó Braonáin and Máire Ní Bhraonáin, respectively.) (in English, Brennan) and their twin uncles Noel and Pádraig Ó Dúgáin (Duggan). They have adopted various musical styles throughout their history. Beginning as an acoustic folk group mainly performing rearranged traditional Irish songs in Irish, they expanded their sound with original songs in English, vocal harmonies, electronic keyboards, and elements of rock, Celtic, new age, smooth jazz, and Gregorian chant.

Initially known as An Clann as Dobhar ('the Family from Dore'), they shortened their name to Clannad in 1973. By 1979 they had released three albums and toured Europe and the US. From 1980 to 1982 they operated as a six-piece with their sister and niece Eithne (Enya). In 1982, they gained international attention with their single "Theme from Harry's Game". They experimented with new age and pop-influenced sounds in the 1980s and 1990s and their music came to be defined as almost purely Celtic, making them innovators of that genre. In 1997, after 15 albums, they took a break and pursued solo projects. The band regrouped in 2007 as a four-piece with Moya (who adopted that spelling instead of Máire in 2002), Ciarán, Noel, and Pádraig and completed a world tour in 2008. In 2013, Pól rejoined and they released their first studio album in fifteen years. Pádraig Duggan died in 2016. The remaining group embarked on their farewell tour in 2020 as a quartet.

Clannad have won numerous awards throughout their career, including a Grammy Award, a BAFTA, an Ivor Novello Award, and a Billboard Music Award. They have recorded in six different languages and scored eight UK top 10 albums. They were often more popular abroad than in their native Ireland, and are considered to have brought Irish music and the Irish language to a wider audience.

== History ==
=== Formation ===
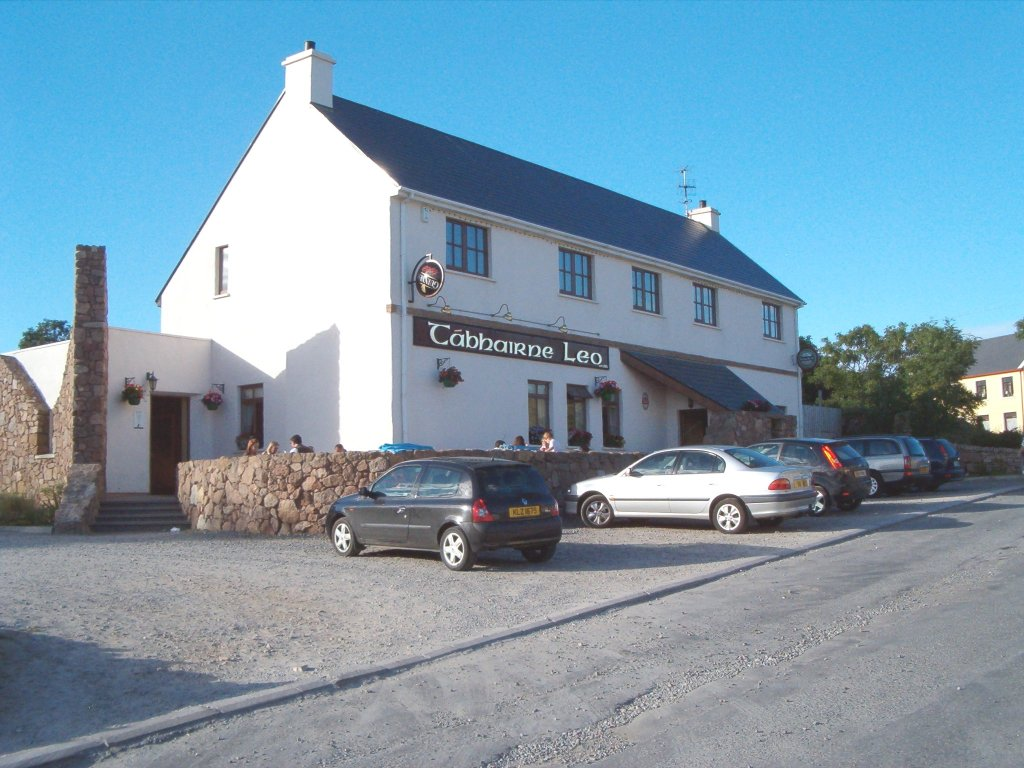
Leo's Tavern in Meenaleck, County Donegal, the pub owned by Leo Brennan where members of Clannad first performed

Clannad was formed by siblings Ciarán, Máire, and Pól Brennan with their twin uncles Noel and Pádraig Duggan. (Despite the ostensible generation gap, the Brennans and their uncles were in fact very close in age, with only three years separating the Duggan brothers from Máire.) They grew up in Dore, a remote parish in Gweedore, County Donegal; in north-western Ireland, it is a Gaeltacht region where Irish is the main spoken language. They were raised as a Roman Catholic family of musicians: the Brennans' mother, Máire "Baba" Brennan (née Duggan), the daughter of the local headmaster, was a music teacher and later choir leader; and their father, Leo Brennan, who played saxophone and accordion, was a member of the Slieve Foy, an Irish showband that had toured Ireland and Scotland. In 1968, the Brennan and Duggan fathers bought and restored a dilapidated old tavern in nearby Meenaleck and ran it as a music bar called Leo's Tavern. Their children performed there together and developed their own act, with Ciaran and Pól Brennan on bass, vocals, and bongos; Pádraig and Noel Duggan on guitars; and elder Brennan sister Máire on harp and vocals.

The five young musicians made their live debut in 1970 at a music competition held during the inaugural Slógadh Youth Festival in Letterkenny. Máire, the eldest member, who had learned the harp and could play "holy songs and Brian Boru", was elected lead vocalist. They had not intended to enter the competition, but were encouraged to try by the local police sergeant and family members, and they submitted their entry form with ten minutes to spare before the post was to be collected. They won the Slógadh competition prize of Ir£500, a trophy, and a recording contract with Polydor Records, although the band members were too young to sign it. With help from a grandfather, they had named themselves An Clann as Dobhar, Irish for 'the Family from Dore', and they used this name until 1973, when they shortened the name to Clannad.

They established themselves as an acoustic folk group, collecting material from old singers and story-tellers in Donegal and building a repertoire of traditional Irish songs, arranged in a contemporary style for a full band. This approach attracted criticism at first because the Irish language was associated with poverty, but as Pól Brennan recalled: "Once they said that ... we just had to do it even more." They also wrote original material, and covered songs by the Beatles, the Rolling Stones, and Joni Mitchell.

=== 1973–1982: early years and six-piece band with Enya ===
"Liza" (1973)
A sample of "Liza" from Clannad (1973), the first song that Clannad wrote.

In 1973, Clannad came in first place in the Letterkenny folk festival and were offered a deal with Philips Records, which they negotiated themselves. Having secured a label, the group prepared material for a debut album. They recorded at Eamonn Andrews Studios in Dublin, choosing Irish- and English-language songs and a cover of "Morning Dew" by Bonnie Dobson. Released in 1973, Clannad was met with initial resistance from the label because of the use of Irish, and the group soon found themselves more popular outside Ireland, particularly in Germany. Later in 1973, Clannad competed for Ireland in the heat stages of the 1973 Eurovision Song Contest with the song "An Pháirc".

In 1974, the band followed their debut album with Clannad 2, released by Gael Linn Records and produced by Dónal Lunny, the founder of Planxty and the Bothy Band. Like their first album, Clannad 2 featured a mixture of English- and Irish-language songs, with Lunny and members of the Bothy Band on additional instruments. It also featured the band's first use of a synthesizer, and was heavier on the folk-rock side, with notable electric guitar, that several later releases.

Their next album, Dúlamán ('Seaweed'), was released in 1976. The title track "Dúlamán", a traditional Irish folk song, became a stage favourite. The album was recorded at Rockfield Studios in Wales and was their first to be produced by Nicky Ryan, who also became the group's manager alongside his wife Roma Ryan. Clannad capitalised on their growing popularity in Europe by including liner notes in German and French and undertaking a tour of Europe. At one show, the standing ovation the band received after an extended rendition of "Níl Sé Ina Lá (Níl Sé'n Lá)" from Clannad convinced them to continue as full-time musicians. Recordings from a tour of Switzerland in 1978 were released in the following year as Clannad in Concert. Also in 1979, Clannad undertook a 36-date tour of North America, the most extensive by an Irish band at that time.

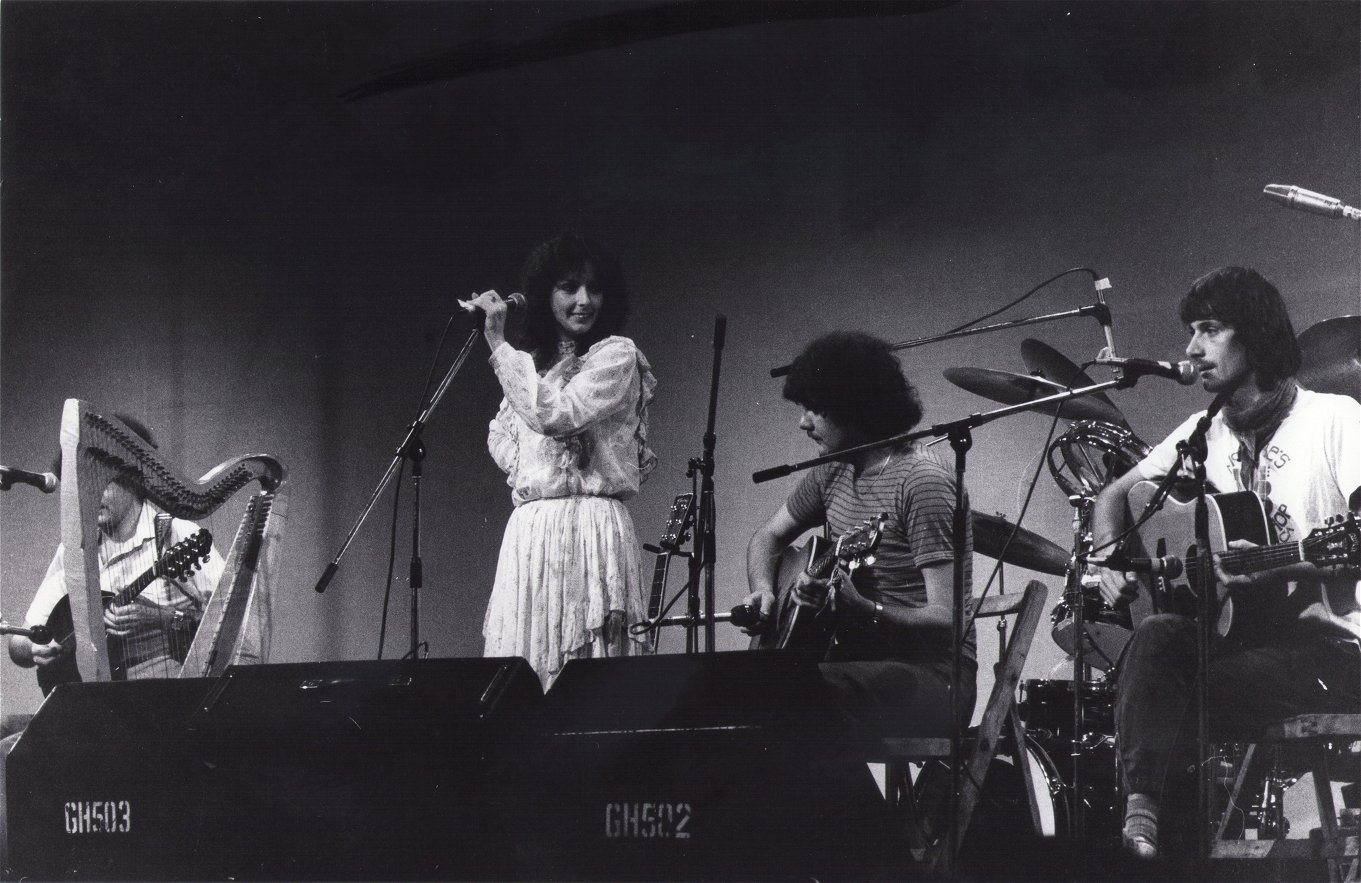
At the 1982 Leeds Folk Festival

In 1980, Clannad became a six-piece band when Nicky Ryan invited a younger Brennan sister, Eithne (Enya), to join as an additional singer and keyboard player to expand the group's sound via extra vocals and electronic instruments. Eithne's first recordings with Clannad were made as a guest musician (uncredited) on their fifth studio album, Crann Úll ('Apple Tree'), which was recorded in Cologne, Germany, and released in 1980 on Tara Music. "Ar a Ghabháil 'n a 'Chuain Domh" featured a particularly full band arrangement which reflected their live jams, while "Lá Cuimhthíoch Fán dTuath" showed early hints of a more atmospheric side to the band's arrangements.

By the time Clannad entered Windmill Lane Studios in Dublin to record their next album, Fuaim ('Sound'), Eithne had become a full-time member. This album, on the Tara Records label, continued the group's experimentation with electronic instruments, and Eithne was featured on lead vocals on "An tÚll" and "Buaireadh an Phósta". Neil Buckley played clarinet and saxophone, with Noel Bridgeman on percussion and Pat Farrell on electric guitar. Fuaim was released by Tara Music in 1982. Despite Nicky Ryan's attempt to steer Clannad towards a more layered, electronic, heavily-produced direction, he felt that they had a tendency to revert to their original folk-music style; following arguments and a band meeting during a 1982 European tour, the Ryans resigned as group managers. Eithne, feeling increasingly restricted in a band setting, departed with them to pursue what would prove to be an internationally successful solo career, as Enya, with the Ryans as collaborators.

=== 1982–1985: "Theme from Harry's Game" and Magical Ring ===
"Theme from Harry's Game" (1982)
The song that introduced Clannad to a worldwide audience.

In 1982, the five-piece Clannad signed to RCA Records and acquired Dave Kavanagh as their new manager. They accepted an invitation to record the title music for Harry's Game, a three-part television drama depicting the Troubles in Northern Ireland, based on the novel of the same name by Gerald Seymour. Seymour suggested that the band record music for the show. Ciarán, Pól, and Máire wrote "Theme from Harry's Game" in a few hours. It was recorded in two days and became an atmospheric piece featuring a Prophet-5 synthesizer and over 100 tracked vocals, a departure from their usual acoustic folk sound. Released as a single in October 1982, "Theme from Harry's Game" became the band's commercial breakthrough and caught international attention. It peaked at No. 2 in Ireland and No. 5 in the UK, and reached the top 20 in the Netherlands and Sweden. It remains the only UK hit single to have been sung entirely in Irish. Clannad's national exposure increased further when they performed the song on Top of the Pops. From 1983 to 1987, Irish rock band U2 used the song at the end of their concerts.

Two minutes of haunting vocal magic – the sort of thing Clannad have been doing for years – and all of a sudden everybody wants to know who they are.

— Belfast Telegraph, November 1982

Following this success, the group released their seventh studio album, Magical Ring, in March 1983. In addition to "Theme from Harry's Game", it featured a mix of original and traditional Irish songs plus a cover of "I See Red" by Jim Rafferty. The album peaked at No. 26 in the UK, and became the group's first album to be certified gold by the British Phonographic Industry (BPI). Two singles were released from the album: "I See Red" went to No. 19 in Ireland and No. 81 in the UK, and "Newgrange" reached No. 30 and No. 65, respectively. In April 1983, Clannad were awarded a Hot Press Music Award for their impact on Irish music in the previous year. Around this time, Máire noted that although the group had lost fans of their traditional folk sound, they had gained new ones as a result of their commercial success.

A month after Magical Ring was released, the band were commissioned to score the 26-episode television drama series Robin of Sherwood, which was broadcast on ITV from 1984 to 1986. They created music for a range of characters and events related to the legend of Robin Hood and, for the first time, they recorded entirely in English. In May 1984, a soundtrack album from the series was released as Legend and reached No. 9 in New Zealand and No. 15 in the UK. The theme tune of the series was released as a single titled "Robin (The Hooded Man)" that went to No. 19 in Ireland and No. 42 in the UK. Clannad won a BAFTA for Best Original Television Music, the first Irish band to win it, in 1985. In 1984, the band embarked on their first major concert tour of the UK, which was followed by a 18-month world tour, including dates across the US and USSR.

=== 1985–1989: Macalla and Sirius ===
In 1985, Clannad released their next album, Macalla ('Echo'), which was recorded in Switzerland, England, and Ireland. Apart from one traditional song, the album contained all-original material, and yielded a hit single, "In a Lifetime", a duet with U2 singer Bono, which began with Máire teaching some Irish to Bono during the introduction. The album featured numerous backing musicians, who continued to work with the band on tour, including ex-King Crimson saxophonist Mel Collins, Moving Hearts' guitarist Anthony Drennan, and drummer Paul Moran. Also on board was producer Steve Nye, who oversaw the pop-flavoured "Closer to Your Heart" and the ballad "Almost Seems (Too Late to Turn)" both of which became hit singles. "Almost Seems" served as the Children in Need charity single in 1985. In 1986, the band put out their first anthology album, The Collection.

In October 1987, Clannad worked with American producers Russ Kunkel (drummer of James Taylor's band) and Greg Ladanyi on their next album, Sirius. The album was given a contemporary pop-influenced sound and production, creating the impression that it was recorded in the US, although it was recorded in the UK and mixed in Los Angeles. Máire Brennan recalled that the band had been at an experimental stage at the time and said Ladanyi and Kunkel had not listened to their previous records. Ciarán thought the music had been "sandpapered down to be a radio-friendly album", and that the production had relied too heavily on a computer. Sirius featured "Something to Believe In", a duet with Bruce Hornsby on vocals and keyboards, and guest appearances by Steve Perry (of Journey) and JD Souther. In February 1988, the band began a world tour which included dates across Europe, Australia, and the US, to commemorate their 15th anniversary.

In between their 1988 tour dates, the group scored three episodes of the BBC wildlife documentary series Natural World about the Atlantic Ocean, which were broadcast in January 1989. A soundtrack album of the score was released in 1989 as Atlantic Realm by BBC Records (reissued 1996 by BMG), and went to No. 41 in the UK. In addition, Clannad released a second anthology album, Pastpresent, which focused on their output 1982-on, with two new tracks: "The Hunter" and "World of Difference". The album was a commercial success, peaking at No. 5 in the UK, where it was certified platinum for over 300,000 copies sold. It was promoted with a sold-out UK tour and the release of a double A-side single, "Hourglass" with "Theme from Harry's Game", although "Hourglass" was not on the anthology. Clannad provided music for The Angel and the Soldier Boy, an animated film narrated by actor Tom Conti. Ciarán and Pól Brennan wrote the music, which was performed by the band. A soundtrack with the same name was released in 1989. Also in 1989, Clannad won four Clio Awards for their music used in a US advertisement produced by An Bord Fáilte.

=== 1989–2000: four-piece band, Anam, Banba, and Lore ===
In 1989, Pól Brennan left Clannad to work with Peter Gabriel as a producer for the WOMAD arts festival and as an acoustic specialist. The band continued as a four-piece and wrote, arranged, and recorded their next album, Anam ('Soul'), in under three months, with Ciarán Brennan becoming their producer and primary songwriter. Released in October 1990, the album – which included the group's sister/niece Brídín Brennan as a guest harmony vocalist – peaked at No. 14 in the UK. Its US release followed in 1992 and included "In a Lifetime" and "Theme from Harry's Game", which had appeared in the film Patriot Games (1992) and a Volkswagen television advert, boosting the group's recognition. The interest generated by the Volkswagen advert saw Anam reach No. 46 on the US Billboard 200, the group's highest position on the chart. In 1996, the album reached gold certification in the US after selling 500,000 copies. The track won a Billboard Music Award for World Music Song of the Year. "Rí na Cruinne" was included on One World One Voice, a charity compilation album intended to raise awareness of environmental issues.

"I Will Find You"
From Banba (1993).

In 1990, Brídín re-joined the group for live performances, supplying additional instruments and backing vocals. Around this time a documentary on the band's 20-year history was produced, titled Clannad in Donegal. In 1991, Clannad released a cover version of "Both Sides Now" by Joni Mitchell, as a duet with singer Paul Young. The track had been recorded for the Blake Edwards film Switch.

In late 1992, the group started working on material for their next album, Banba, named after an Irish mythological figure. Ciarán wrote fifteen songs in his home studio, and he and Máire picked out tracks to develop further and produced demos, then arranged the best parts into complete songs. Released in May 1993, the album went to No. 5 in the UK and No. 110 in the US. It featured "I Will Find You", written for the film The Last of the Mohicans (1992), and had Máire singing in English, Mohican, and Cherokee. Máire said director Michael Mann had liked their Irish songs, but they were unsure of writing a song about early American history in Irish and opted instead to use Native American languages. An English version was also recorded. Banba was nominated for a Grammy Award for Best New Age Album and, like its predecessor, it achieved gold certification in the US after selling 500,000 copies. The album was supported by Clannad's 20th anniversary UK tour, which ended in July 1993 with a concert at Lincoln Castle.

By early 1996, Clannad had recorded and finished the next album, Lore, but its release was delayed after the band tried to leave BMG (owner of RCA Records since 1987) and sign a worldwide deal with Atlantic Records, their US distributor. Released in March 1996, the album, which featured American drummer Vinnie Colaiuta, reached No. 14 in the UK and debuted at No. 1 on the Billboard Top World Albums chart, displacing Gipsy Kings after their 24-week run at the top. "Croí Cróga" ('Brave Heart') was originally written for the Mel Gibson film Braveheart (1995), but did not make the final cut for its soundtrack. "Farewell Love" was used in the soundtrack of the Irish drama film A Further Gesture (1997).

Clannad's tour to promote the album included their first sold-out shows in Japan, and also featured another of the younger siblings, Deirdre (Dee) Brennan, as a touring member of the band on bodhrán percussion and backing vocals (along with guest musicians Mel Collins, Ian Parker, Ian Melrose, and Ray Fean, several of whom would collaborate on further Clannad and Máire/Moya Brennan albums). (Note: Highlights from the European leg of this tour were released in 2005 on the live album Clannad: Live in Concert.)

Also that year, Clannad received a Lifetime Achievement Award from the Irish Recorded Music Association. In April 1996, the group split with their manager, Dave Kavanagh, after 14 years.

Clannad returned to RCA/BMG in 1997 with the album Landmarks. Deirdre Brennan reappeared as guest bodhrán player on two tracks, "Let Me See" and "Of This Land"; in the latter, Máire sang about Ireland's past and future. The track "Fadó" ('Long Ago') demonstrated the influences of Celtic history on the band's music. In 1999, Landmarks won the group a Grammy award for Best New Age Album. Also in 1999, the group wrote "What Will I Do" for the Kevin Costner romantic-drama film Message in a Bottle.

=== 2000–present: hiatus, five-piece reunion, Nádúr, and final tour ===
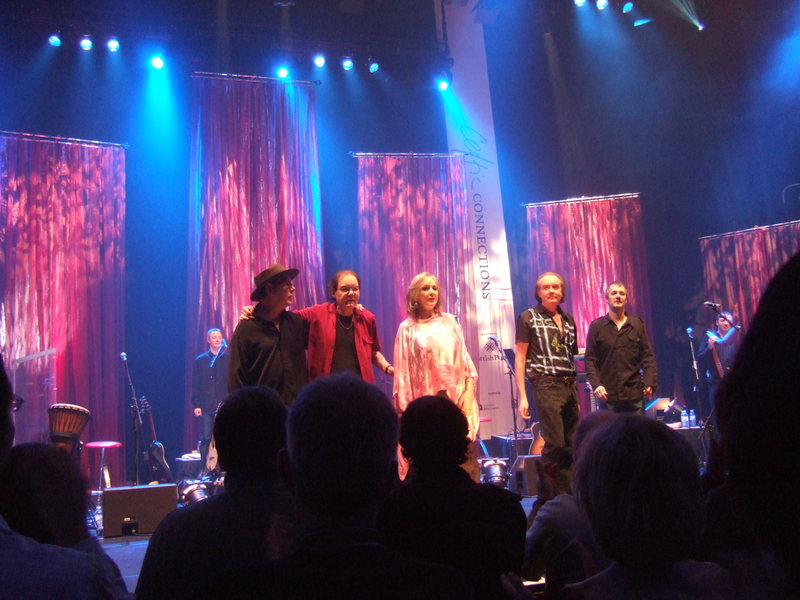
Clannad returned as a five piece in January 2007

Between 1999 and 2007, Clannad were largely inactive while individual members pursued solo projects. Máire started publicly using the spelling Moya Brennan in 2002, despite having previously released a solo album titled Máire. In 2003, BMG/RCA released the greatest hits anthology The Best of Clannad: In a Lifetime, which peaked at No. 23 in the UK. In the following year, the Duggan twins recorded together for the first time outside of Clannad and released an album, Rubicon, under the name the Duggans.

Clannad reunited for a one-off performance in 2006 during Moya Brennan's solo concert in De Doelen, the Netherlands, which was dedicated to their parents, Leo and Máire "Baba" Brennan. The version of the group included Pól and Deirdre Brennan, performing five songs together in the second half of the concert. Leo and Baba Máire, who were present, did not know that this was planned. The performance was greeted with standing ovations from the audience. In January 2007, the five original members of Clannad performed at the Celtic Connections Festival in Glasgow. In the following month, the group received a Lifetime Achievement Award at the annual Meteor Ireland Music Awards in Dublin.

In March 2008, Clannad began their first UK tour in over 12 years. In May 2008, Clannad's version of the traditional song "Down by the Salley Gardens" was featured in the GCSE listening paper for music from the Oxford, Cambridge, and RSA Examinations exam board. Also in 2008, two anthologies were released: Celtic Themes: The Very Best of Clannad, and Beginnings: The Best of the Early Years. In 2009, Clannad were nominated for an IMA Award for Best Revival Act.

In 2011, Pól Brennan returned to the group as a full-time member for the first time since 1990. He said later that the most exciting thing about his return was writing songs with his brother Ciarán again. In January 2011, two additional concerts were scheduled at Christ Church Cathedral in Dublin after high demand for tickets. The group appeared on RTÉ's The Late Late Show on 21 January, performing "Theme from Harry's Game" with vocal ensemble Anúna. It was their first appearance on the show in 14 years.

In September 2013, Clannad released Nádúr ('Nature') on the ARC Music label, their first studio album since 1998. It was the band's final album before the death of Pádraig Duggan in 2016. They began an international tour in October 2013 which started in Australia and New Zealand and continued through 2014. In 2016, Moya Brennan announced she had been diagnosed with pulmonary fibrosis, a progressive lung disease that required her to rephrase the vocals to some songs.

In February 2020, BMG announced the release of In a Lifetime, a greatest-hits anthology to commemorate the band's fiftieth anniversary. Released on 3 April by BMG, the album was available on CD, vinyl, digital platforms, and a deluxe edition that contained over 100 tracks spanning their career. The set included two new tracks, "A Celtic Dream" and "Who Knows Where the Time Goes", their first recordings since Pádraig Duggan's passing. The album coincided with the In a Lifetime Tour, their final tour as a group, which was to take place in the UK and North America between March and October 2020. The tour was postponed after several shows because of the COVID-19 pandemic and resumed in 2021. Noel Duggan died on 15 October 2022, aged 73. The band performed a farewell concert at the 3Arena in Dublin on 18 February 2023. The tour concluded in Seattle, Washington, on 9 October 2023, after which Clannad planned to disband, with individual members pursuing solo projects.

However, the band later played their final concert in Royal Albert Hall on 30 October 2024. The first half comprised a 40th-anniversary reprise of Legend and other Robin of Sherwood material, with many of the TV show's actors in attendance. The second half consisted of other songs from their repertoire.

The band performed a brief one-off appearance at a concert to mark the start of a 50th-anniversary year for Hot Press magazine in February 2026.

In April 2026 Moya Brennan died, aged 73.

== Musical style and legacy ==
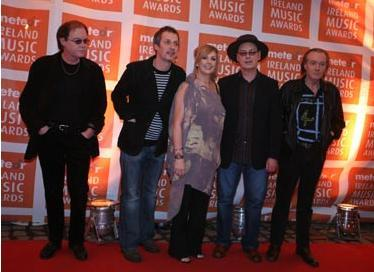
The original Clannad line-up at the 2006 Meteor Awards: Pádraig Duggan, Pól Brennan, Moya Brennan, Ciarán Brennan, and Noel Duggan

There's a feeling in all our music, an ambience that stems directly from where we were brought up and to have to define our sound, I always say that if they were to visit Gweedore they wouldn't need to ask.

— Ciarán Brennan, Clannad.org.uk

When Clannad first started out in the early 1970s, their music and sound stemmed primarily from their traditional Irish background (albeit with rock and jazz influences). They popularised such old songs as "Dúlamán", "Teidhir Abhaile Riú" and "Coinleach Glas an Fhómhair", and these songs remained favourites at their concerts. After departing from their folk and traditional background in 1982, they created a new sound that was to help define the meaning of new age and especially modern Celtic music. When "Theme from Harry's Game" and "Newgrange" were first heard, radio stations all over the world were fascinated by an unearthly and spiritual sound that they had not heard before. One critic said "the tunes were steeped in the old ways, but the production and the arrangement was fresh and inventive". This transition in Clannad's career is often seen as pioneering the Celtic music genre. They are also noted for their melodious harmonies, which have been at the heart of their music since their first album. Legend (1984) was based on English folklore, and with later albums Clannad delved further into the realms of electronica and pop. Many of their singles entered pop charts around the world and widened their fan base. Despite their success with this genre of music, the group maintained a link with their Gaelic roots, giving traditional Irish songs such as "Tráthnóna Beag Aréir" and "Buachaill Ón Éirne" the Clannad treatment.

While the rock-infused Sirius and the pop-inclined Macalla were successful, the style that the band created themselves has left the group's greater legacy. Its influence can be found in the soundtrack of the film Titanic, where composer James Horner imitated Clannad's musical style and the soundtrack sounded so much like Clannad that it has been mistakenly attributed to them. The band's 'Celtic mysticism' is a recurring theme in the film Intermission. Lead singer Moya Brennan said that Clannad's "otherworldly" and "ethereal" sound came from the ancient hills and glens that surrounded Gweedore. Traces of Clannad's legacy can be heard in the music of many artists, including Enya, Altan, Capercaillie, the Corrs, Loreena McKennitt, Anúna, Riverdance, Órla Fallon, and U2. Bono has said that Moya has "one of the greatest voices the human ear has ever experienced".

A Japanese visual novel released in 2004, which spawned a 2007 film and a 2007–08 television series based on it, was named after the band because screenwriter Jun Maeda mistakenly believed it to mean 'family' in Irish.

== Brennan family ==
The Brennans are Ireland's most successful music family; as of 2005, the combined record sales of Clannad and Enya exceeded 70 million units sold, while the solo albums of Moya (Máire) Brennan, Pól Brennan, and Brídín have also had some commercial and critical success.

Leo Brennan (born Leopold Henry Brennan-Harden; died 22 June 2016, aged 90) and Máire "Baba" Duggan (b.1930) are the parents of the Brennan siblings Máire (Moya), Ciarán, Pól, Deirdre (Dee), Leon, Eithne (Enya), Olive, Bartley, and Brídín.

Leo Brennan was a musician who played in the Slieve Foy, an Irish showband, while Baba Máire Duggan was an amateur musician who taught music at Gweedore Community School and led the local choir, Cór Mhúire Doire Beaga. The family lived in Dore, a parish in Gweedore, County Donegal. In 1968, the pair bought a dilapidated pub in Meenaleck for Ir£1,500, Refurbished and re-opened as Leo's Tavern, it became a gestation place for local music, including Clannad's formation.

The core of Clannad has consisted of Ciarán, Moya/Máire, and Pól Brennan (with their uncles Noel and Pádraig Duggan), although Enya/Eithne, Deirdre, Leon, Olive, and Brídín have all been short-term studio band members, live band members, and/or studio guest performers with the group at one phase or another. Several of them have also participated in Moya/Máire's solo recordings, including Baba as a choir leader. Leon has also sometimes been involved in the management and production side for both acts. Deirdre (credited as Dee) and Olive have been guests on several Máire/Moya albums. Brídín, Dee, Máire, and Olive have also all performed together as guests on Scottish band Runrig's 1993 Amazing Things. Most performer members of the family have individually collaborated with additional artists.

At the 2005 Earagail Arts Festival, Leo performed solo, Baba led a Cór Mhúire Doire Beaga choir performance, and both Clannad and Moya Brennan featured in their own separate sets, though none were headliners for the event. (Note: Highlights of all four sets have been released on a live compilation album, Earagail Arts Festival 2005: Oidhreacht (Legacy).) The five Brennan sisters performed two hymns at the contemporary St. Mary's church, which previously stood in Derrybeg until 2025.

== Members ==
Current/final members

- Ciarán Brennan – bass, guitar, keyboards, mandolin, vocals (1970–2024)
- Pól Brennan – flute, guitar, percussion, whistles, vocals (1970–1990, 2011–2024)

Past members/contributors

- Moya (Máire) Brennan – vocals, harp (1970–2024; died 2026)
- Noel Duggan – guitar, vocals (1970–2022; his death)
- Pádraig Duggan – guitar, mandola, mandolin, vocals (1970–2016; his death)
- Enya (Eithne Brennan) – keyboards, percussion, vocals (1980–1982)
- Brídín Brennan – backing vocals, various instruments (1989–1990; touring-band and studio guest-musician only)
- Deirdre (Dee) Brennan – percussion, backing vocals (1996–1997, 2006; touring-band and studio guest-musician only)

== Discography ==
Studio albums

- Clannad (1973)
- Clannad 2 (1974)
- Dúlamán (1976)
- Crann Úll (1980)
- Fuaim (1982)
- Magical Ring (1983)
- Legend (1984)
- Macalla (1985)
- Sirius (1987)
- Atlantic Realm (1989)
- The Angel and the Soldier Boy (1989)
- Anam (1990)
- Banba (1993)
- Lore (1996)
- Landmarks (1997)
- Nádúr (2013)

== Bibliography ==
- Pastpresent (1989) – sheet-music book for Pastpresent album
- A Woman's Voice (1991) – Eddie Rowley in conversation with Máire Brennan
- Ireland: Landscapes of God's Peace, Máire Brennan (2000) – sometimes called God of Peace
- The Other Side of the Rainbow: The Autobiography of the Voice of Clannad, Máire Brennan, with Angela Little (2001)
- Moments in a Lifetime, Noel Duggan (2008) – detailing Clannad's journey as a band

== Awards and nominations ==
Won

- 1982: Ivor Novello Awards, Best Soundtrack, for "Theme from Harry's Game"
- 1984: BAFTA Awards, Best Television Music, for Robin of Sherwood
- 1992: Billboard Music Award, World Music Song of the Year, for "Rí na Cruinne"
- 1999: Grammy Awards, Best New Age Album, for Landmarks
- 2007: Meteor Music Awards, Lifetime Achievement Award
- 2014: BBC Radio 2 Folk Awards, Lifetime Achievement Award

Nominations

1. 1982: BAFTA Awards, Best Television Music, for Theme from Harry's Game
2. 1994: Grammy Awards, Best New Age Album, for Banba
3. 1996: Grammy Awards, Best New Age Album, for Lore
4. 2009: Ireland's Music Awards, Best Revival Act
