= In a Lifetime =

1986 song by Clannad and Bono

Single by Clannad featuring Bono

from the album Macalla
- Released: 13 January 1986
- Recorded: 1985, Windmill Lane Studios, Dublin, Ireland
- Genre: Pop rock, new-age
- Length: 3:09
- Label: BMG and Island Records
- Songwriters: Pól Brennan, Ciarán Brennan
- Producer: Steve Nye

Clannad featuring Bono singles chronology
"Almost Seems (Too Late to Turn)" (1985)	"In a Lifetime" (1986)	"Robin of Sherwood EP" (1986)

Audio sample
- file; help

Music video
- "In a Lifetime" on YouTube

"In a Lifetime" is a pop song performed by Irish artists Clannad and Bono. It was written by brothers Pól Brennan and Ciarán Brennan and produced by Steve Nye. The single was released in January 1986, and was the third single to be released from Clannad's eighth studio album Macalla (1985). It charted in many countries including United States, Ireland, UK, Italy and Brazil. It is one of Clannad's most successful songs and it remains as Bono's most successful solo effort.

The single was re-released in 1989 with a change of artwork on the cover and a different B Side ("Something To Believe In (edit)"). The song also appears on Moya Brennan's 2008 live album Heart Strings and on Triniti's début album.

== Background ==
Clannad had already written most of the lyrics for the song and recorded a backing track when the group asked Bono of U2 if he would collaborate with them on the recording, the first time the group had allowed an outside artist to join them in recording one of their tracks. The track was recorded over two nights at Windmill Lane Studios in Dublin. After the first evening’s recording session was completed an electrical storm raged throughout the night which inspired many of the artists to bring extra lyrics and ideas for the track to the following day’s session, with Pol Brennan explaining later that he had stayed up much of the night writing. The second day’s recording saw Bono improvise some of his lyrics and vocal style to suit the song, completing his contribution in two takes. The recording session, as Moya Brennan remembers, was “one of the most remarkable things I’ve ever seen in a studio.”

== Music video ==
The video was shot in Clannad's hometown of Gweedore, County Donegal, Ireland. It is set in 1930's Ireland and it is based on the lives of local folk around this time. The visuals are very atmospheric and fit well with the song's theme. It shows young children walking along a narrow road in the countryside, followed by a hearse. It also shows old men drinking in a pub. The video, which was directed by Meiert Avis, shows a haunting portrayal of the Irish countryside and old Irish traditions.

== Track listing ==
7" vinyl (TS 025 / PB 40535)

1. "In a Lifetime"
2. "Indoor"

12" vinyl (PT 40536)

1. "In a Lifetime"
2. "Northern Skyline"
3. "Indoor"
4. "Newgrange"

== Charts ==
=== Weekly charts ===
Chart (1986-1989)	Peak position
Dutch Top 40	14
Ireland	5
Italy Airplay (Music & Media)	11
New Zealand Chart	32
UK Singles Chart	17

== 1989 re-release ==
To promote Clannad's 'best-of' compilation, Pastpresent, "In a Lifetime" was re-released on 19 June 1989. The song was the second single from the compilation. The single was released on four formats, which included a picture disc version of the 7" vinyl release. The B-side of the single included the track "Something to Believe In", a collaboration with American musician Bruce Hornsby, taken from the 1987 Clannad album Sirius.

=== Track listing ===
7" vinyl & cassette

1. In a Lifetime
2. Something to Believe In

12" vinyl

1. In a Lifetime
2. Something to Believe In
3. Caisleán Óir
4. The Wild Cry

5" compact disc

1. In a Lifetime
2. Something to Believe In
3. Caisleán Óir
4. The Wild Cry
5. Atlantic Realm [edit]

== 1993 Jameson Irish Whiskey campaign re-release ==
In 1993, in connection with an advertising campaign for Jameson Irish Whiskey, both "Theme from Harry's Game" and "In a Lifetime" were re-released in The Netherlands.

=== Track listing ===
1. "In a Lifetime"
2. "There for You"
