= Robin (The Hooded Man) =

Single by Clannad

from the album Legend (Robin of Sherwood soundtrack)
- Released: 20 April 1984; 1986 (EP)
- Studio: Windmill, Dublin, Ireland
- Genre: Pop rock, New-age
- Length: 2:54
- Label: BMG
- Songwriter: Ciarán Brennan
- Producer: Tony Clarke

Clannad singles chronology
"Newgrange" (1983)	"Robin (The Hooded Man)" (1984)	"Now is Here" (1984)

Audio sample
- file; help

"Robin (The Hooded Man)" is the first single released by Irish group Clannad in April from their 1984 album Legend. This song was the theme tune to the ITV drama Robin of Sherwood and demonstrated Clannad's effectiveness as soundtrack composers and performers.

A promotional video was filmed and released for the song, showing Clannad playing in the studio intercut with scenes from the TV series.

The single peaked at number 42 on the UK charts and the EP peaked at number 80.

== Track listing ==
7" vinyl

1. "Robin (The Hooded Man)"
2. "Lady Marian"

== EP ==
An EP was released in 1986. The version that appears on the EP was re-recorded for the third series of the HTV series Robin of Sherwood. This new version of the song has yet to appear on any other release.

=== Track listing ===
7" vinyl (PB 40681)

1. "Robin (The Hooded Man) [new version]"
2. "Caisleán Óir"
3. "Now Is Here"
4. "Herne"
