= The Duggans =

Irish musical duo

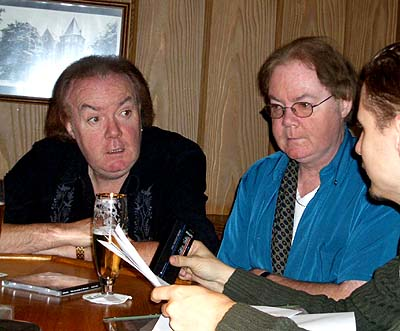
- Noel and Pádraig Duggan in 2004

Background information
- Origin: County Donegal, Ireland
- Genres: Folk, Celtic
- Years active: 2004–2016
- Label: MDM.ie
- Past members: Noel Duggan; Pádraig Duggan
- Website: www.clannad.ie/rubicon.html

The Duggans (Irish: Na Dúgáiní) were an Irish musical duo from County Donegal, Ireland. They were founder members of the Irish folk group Clannad.

== Early life ==
Twin brothers Noel Duggan and Pádraig (Patrick) Duggan (Irish: Ó Dúgáin) were born on 23 January 1949 in Gweedore, County Donegal, to Maire and Aodh Ó Dúgáin. They were the youngest in a family of seven. The brothers learned to speak Gaelic as their first language and acted on stage with a local theatre group from an early age. They took piano lessons, then learned to play guitar in their early teens. Both trained on a radio officers' course as preparation for going to sea, but chose music instead.

They played in the Slieve Foy Band, an Irish showband whose members included their elder sister Baba and her husband Leo Brennan, who bought a pub, Ionad Jack in the village of Meenaleck, which they helped to renovate and reopen as Tabhairne Leo (Leo's Tavern). The pub became the home of informal music sessions with a group of family members, hosting live music every night, and the Duggan brothers became mainstays of the sessions. Their early repertoire consisted of American country numbers and arrangements of contemporary songs by artists such as Joni Mitchell and The Beatles, until their mother suggested that they should sing in Gaelic. The brothers used a tape recorder to collect old Irish songs from elderly people in their village and on Tory Island, ten miles off the coast of Donegal, the place of origin of the Duggan family, "before they were lost forever".

== Musical career ==
The brothers came to prominence in the 1970s with the folk group Clannad. The band took a ten-year break after winning a Grammy Award for their 1998 album Landmarks and the two brothers continued performing as The Duggans. They later toured extensively with their band Norland Wind. They were introduced to television by Tony MacMahon, and in 2005 released their first studio album Rubicon, which featured Moya Brennan, Finbar Furey and Órla Fallon among others. Rubicon was met with critical acclaim and sold well throughout Ireland. The brothers played again as part of Clannad after the band reformed in 2007, following a family gathering in Leo's Tavern to celebrate their sister's 50th birthday.

== Rubicon ==
In 2005, the Duggans recorded their debut studio album, consisting of traditional songs and ballads in the Irish language along with self-penned songs in English. The album featured long-time collaborators Thomas Loefke and Kerstin Blodig of Norland Wind, Moya Brennan, Brídín Brennan and Celtic Woman's Órla Fallon.

== Deaths ==
Pádraig died in Dublin on 9 August 2016, at the age of 67. Noel died in Donegal on 15 October 2022, at the age of 73.

== Discography ==
=== Studio album ===
- Rubicon (2005)

=== Compilation ===
- Irish Ballads (various artists – 2005)

== Bibliography ==
- Moments in a Lifetime, Noel Duggan (2008) – detailing Clannad's journey as a band
