= Christopher O'Brien =

Christopher O'Brien may refer to:

- Christopher O'Brien (admiral), Irish naval officer of the eighteenth century
- Christopher D. O'Brien (1848–?), former mayor of St. Paul, Minnesota
- Christopher O'Brien (rugby league) (born 1950), Welsh rugby union and rugby league footballer of the 1970s and 1980s

== See also ==
- Chris O'Brien (disambiguation)
