= Two Horizons =

Studio album by Moya Brennan
- Released: 22 September 2003
- Recorded: 2003
- Genre: Celtic rock
- Length: 61:19
- Label: Universal Records
- Producer: Ross Cullum

Moya Brennan chronology
Whisper to the Wild Water (1999)	Two Horizons (2003)	Óró - A Live Session (2005)

Singles from Two Horizons
- 1. "Show Me" Released: 2003; 2. "Tara" Released: 2003

Professional ratings
Review scores
Source	Rating
AllMusic	4/5 stars
Musical Discoveries	5/5 stars
Cross Rhythms	4.5/5 stars
ARTISTdirect	4/5 stars
Hot Press	3.5/5 stars
Christianity Today	3/5 stars

Two Horizons is the fifth solo album by Irish singer Moya Brennan. It is her first full-length release under the name Moya Brennan, as opposed to Máire Brennan. The album was predominantly recorded in her home studio in Dublin and was nominated for a Grammy award. The album was recorded between 2002 and 2003 and first became available on 23 October 2003. It is Brennan's first non-Christian album since her 1993 recording Misty Eyed Adventures. It is the most successful of her solo albums to date and the second to be Grammy-nominated.

The album marks a change of direction in production, arrangement and style for Brennan in terms of her solo career, featuring no other vocalists but herself. The album features Irish fiddle player Máire Breatnach among others. The album also features much of Brennan's current live band.

Recordings were made in various studios in London, England and Dublin, Ireland during 2003:

- The River, London
- Pulse Recording Studios, Dublin, Ireland
- Mo Studios, Dublin, Ireland

== Track listing ==
All songs written by Moya Brennan and composed by Moya Brennan and Ross Cullum, except where noted:

1. "Show Me" – 4:57
2. "Bright Star" – 4:15
3. "Change My World" – 3:45 (Brennan, Cullum, Fionan DeBarra, Feargal Murray)
4. "Bí Liom" – 4:32
5. "Is It Now [Theme]" – 0:38
6. "Falling" – 4:19 (Brennan, Cullum, DeBarra, Murray)
7. "Tara" – 5:02
8. "Ancient Town" – 3:45
9. "Show Me [Theme]" – 1:08
10. "Sailing Away" – 3:05 (Brennan, Cullum, DeBarra)
11. "River" – 4:08
12. "Is It Now" – 3:50
13. "Mothers of the Desert" – 3:53 (Brennan, Cullum, Murray)
14. "Harpsong" – 3:23
15. "Two Horizons" – 4:29
  - Bonus track
16. "Show Me (Jakatta mix)" – 6:10
  - Hidden track
17. Enhanced content – 15:00 (lists as fifteen minutes in some computer audio players)

== Personnel ==
=== Band ===
- Moya Brennan – Vocals, Harp, Keyboards
- Ross Cullum – Guitars, Percussion, Keyboards
- Sinéad Madden – Fiddle
- Fionán deBarra – Guitar, Bouzouki
- Tiarán Ó Duinnchinn – Uilleann pipes, Whistles
- Paul Byrne – Drums, Percussion
- Ewan Cowley – Mandolin
- Máire Breatnach – Fiddle, Violin
- Éamonn deBarra – Flute
- Robbie McIntosh – Guitars
- Anthony Drennan – Guitars
- Keith Duffy – Bass
- Troy Donockley – Whistles
- Nigel Eaton – Hurdy-gurdy
- Bob Love – Fiddle
- Brendan Monaghan – Bodhran, Lambeg drum
- Sandy McLelland – Drums (on Mothers of the Desert)
- Chris Hughes – Rhythm programming (on Mothers of the Desert)
- Martin Carthy – Guitar (on Change My World, Bí Liom)

=== Additional musicians ===
- String Quartet
  - Úna Ní Chanainn – Cello
  - Brona Cahill – Violin
  - Tommy Kane – Viola
  - Máire Breatnach – Violin, Viola
- String arrangements by Feargal Murray, Ross Cullum

== Singles ==
=== Commercial singles ===
1. "Show Me"

=== Promotional singles ===
1. "Show Me"
2. "Tara"

== Release details ==
- 2003, UK, Universal 980 106–8, Release Date 22 September 2003, CD
- 2003, UK, Universal Moya AL23, Release Date 22 September 2003, Cassette
- 2003, USA, Decca B0001915-12, Release Date 22 September 2003, CD
- 2003, Japan, Universal UICO-1054, Release Date ? September 2003, CD
- 2003, UK, Universal 980 107–0, Release Date ? September, Super Audio CD
