= Whisper to the Wild Water =

Studio album by Moya Brennan
- Released: 19 October 1999
- Recorded: 1999
- Genre: Celtic rock
- Length: 63:56
- Label: Word Records
- Producer: Denis Woods & Máire Brennan

Moya Brennan chronology
Perfect Time (1998)	Whisper to the Wild Water (1999)	Two Horizons (2003)

Whisper to the Wild Water is a music album by Irish musician Máire Brennan, now known as Moya Brennan. This was the fourth solo outing for her, released in 1999. At the 43rd Annual Grammy Awards in 2001, it was nominated for the Best New Age Album.

Recordings were made in various studios in Ireland during 1999:

- Pulse Recording Studios, Dublin, Ireland – (Engineer Tim Martin)
- Windmill Lane Studios, Dublin, Ireland – (Engineer Tim Martin)
- Mo Studios, Dublin, Ireland – (Engineer Tim Martin)

Tony Perrey was the engineer for "Mary of the Gaels" and "Sign from the Hills".

== Track listing ==
CD
No.	Title	Writer(s)	Length
1.	"Follow the Word"	Máire Brennan; Denis Woods; Tim Jarvis	5:13
2.	"Where I Stand"	Brennan; Jarvis	5:17
3.	"Hard to Break the Seal"	Brennan; Woods; Jarvis	4:35
4.	"To the Water"	Brennan; Jarvis	3:25
5.	"Whisper to the Wild Water"	Brennan; Woods; Jarvis	4:44
6.	"Peacemaker" (based on the "Prayer of Saint Francis")	Brennan; Woods	4:28
7.	"Ageless Messengers"	Brennan; Woods	4:45
8.	"I láthair Dé (In God's Presence)"	Brennan; Woods; Jarvis	3:44
9.	"Life"	Brennan; Woods	4:51
10.	"Rinne Tú (You Made)"	Brennan; Jarvis	5:02
11.	"Mary of the Gaels"	Brennan	4:24
12.	"Sign from the Hills"	Brennan; Jarvis	4:34
13.	"Bí Thusa Mo Shúile (Be Thou My Vision)"	Traditional, translation Aodh Ó Dúgáin	2:02
14.	"Don't Give Up" (Bonus track - duet with Michael McDonald)	Peter Gabriel	6:52
Total length:			1:03:56

== Personnel ==
=== Band ===
- Moya Brennan – Vocals, Harp, Keyboards
- Anthony Drennan – Guitars
- Máire Breatnach – Fiddle, Viola
- Mairtín O'Connor – Accordion
- Joe Csibi – Double Bass
- Keith Duffy – Bass
- Denis Woods – Keyboards

=== Additional musicians ===
- Paul Jarvis – Vocals (on Peacemaker)

Máire's Band

- Dee Brennan – Vocals, Percussion
- Sinéad Madden – Vocals, Fiddle
- Ewan Cowley – Vocals, Guitar
- David MacMullan – Keyboards, Piano
- Tiarnan O'Duinnchinn – Uilleann pipes, Low Whistle
- Tony Steele – Bass
- Paul Byrne – Percussion
- Cór Mhuire na Doirí beaga – St. Mary's Church Choir of the Derrybegs (on I Láthair Dé)
- Baba Brennan – Choir Leader
- Dee Brennan – Choir Conductor

== Commercial singles ==
1. "Follow the Word"

== Promotional singles ==
1. "Follow the Word"

== Release details ==
- 1999, UK, Word/Universal Records 7012632267, Release Date 19 October 1999, CD
- 1999, USA, Word/Sony Records ?, Release Date 19 October 1999, CD
- 1999, USA, Word/Sony Records 7012632259, Release Date 19 October 1999, Cassette
- 1999, Japan, Epic Records ESCA 8102, Release Date 19 October 1999, CD
- 2000, UK, Word/Universal Records 157 560-2, Release Date ? February 2000, CD
