= Cormac de Barra =

Cormac DeBarra
- Genres: Celtic, folk, new-age
- Occupations: Harpist, composer
- Years active: 1989–present
- Website: cormacdebarra.com

Cormac de Barra is a harpist, singer and television presenter and is part of the Moya Brennan Band.

== Biography ==
De Barra comes from a family of traditional musicians and singers from Dublin with roots in County Cork. He studied Irish harp with his grandmother, Róisín Ní Shé, in Dublin and went on to study concert harp in the US with Leone Paulson.

Cormac's professional debut was a six-month tour in Osaka, Japan playing in the Irish Exhibition at Expo '90. While in Japan he gave a performance for Emperor Akihito and Empress Michiko in their palace at Akasaka, Tokyo. Also present at the recital was Irish Nobel Laureate, Seamus Heaney. Cormac also spent six months in Seville, Spain, performing at Expo 92.

He toured with a family group, with harpist Anne-Marie O'Farrell and as a solo artist from 1993 onwards, also finding time to work in theatre in Dublin both as a performer in W.B. Yeats' 'The Cúchulain Cycle' and as musical director of a production of 'Playboy of the Western World' at the Ambassador Theatre.

He has also toured the UK, Europe, US and Australia with Hazel O'Connor since 1998 in her autobiographical show 'Beyond Breaking Glass'. De Barra has also played with The Chieftains and the Irish Harp Orchestra, Cathy Jordan of Dervish, Liam Ó Maonlaí and with his brothers Fionán and Éamonn (a member of 'Slide'). De Barra has recorded with Galldubh, Moya Brennan and Brian Kennedy.

Since winning the Féis Ceoil Harp Competition in 1989, something he refers to as his first big moment, he has performed as a solo musician for the Emperor of Japan in Tokyo (at the age of 17), played at the Edinburgh Fringe Festival with Hazel O'Connor and finished his first CD Barcó in 2003.

As well as performing Cormac presented the traditional Irish music series, Flosc, on TG4, Ireland's Gaelic-language TV channel. Flosc was awarded Best Music Series by Irish Music Magazine in 2002. He is a presenter of the arts series Imeall on TG4.

In 2003 Cormac joined his brother Fionán in Moya Brennan's band. In 2007 they were both part of the reunited line-up of Moya's family group, the world-famous Clannad. Since 2009 he has also toured and performed with the singer and composer Julie Feeney.

As well as these other groups, Cormac is also part of a family trio, Barcó, with his brothers Fionán and Éamonn. Recordings to date include the CDs Barcó and An Caitín Bán with the De Barra family, the harp duo CDs Double Strung and Duopoly with Anne-Marie O'Farrell and the flute and harp recording 'Music of Great Irish Houses' with Karin Leitner.

Other collaborations include a duo CD with Máire Breatnach on fiddle and viola, and three CDs Down By the Sea, Songs of the Celtic Winter and Night Travels with the Celtic singer songwriter Ashley Davis in the United States.

de Barra is a fluent Irish speaker.

== Discography ==
=== Studio albums ===
- Barcó, (2003) - Cormac De Barra
- Double Strung, (2005) - Cormac De Barra & Anne-Marie O'Farrell
- Music of Great Irish Houses, (2007) - Cormac De Barra & Karin Leitner
- Tarraing Téad - Pulling Strings, (2010) - Cormac De Barra & Máire Breatnach
- Voices & Harps, (2011) - Cormac de Barra & Moya Brennan
- Affinity, (2013) - Cormac De Barra & Moya Brennan
- Duopoly, (2014) - Cormac De Barra & Anne-Marie O'Farrell
- An Caitín Bán, (2015) - Cormac De Barra & the De Barra and Ó Tuama families
- Timeless, (2019) - Cormac De Barra & Moya Brennan
- The Crannua Collective, (2019) - Cormac De Barra & Éamonn De Barra, Moya Brennan, Dave Curley, Ashley Davis, John Doyle, Dave Curley, Colin Farrell, Cathy Jordan, Gawain Mathews and Mick McAuley

=== Appearances ===
==== With Hazel O'Connor ====
- 5 in the Morning, (1998)
- Beyond Breaking Glass, (2000)
- Acoustically Yours, (2002)
- A Singular Collection, (2003)
- Hidden Heart, (2005)

==== With Moya Brennan ====
- Óró - A Live Session, (2005)
- An Irish Christmas, (2005 & 2006)
- Signature, (2006)
- Signature (Special Tour Edition), (2007)
- Heart Strings, (2008)
- My Match Is A Makin', (2010) - Cormac de Barra & Moya Brennan
- Voices & Harps, (2011) - Cormac de Barra & Moya Brennan
- Affinity, (2013) - Cormac De Barra & Moya Brennan
- Canvas, (2017)

==== Other ====
- Christmassy (2017) - Brian Kennedy
- Night Travels (2014) - Ashley Davis
- Songs of the Celtic Winter (2012) - Ashley Davis
- Clocks (2012) - Julie Feeney
- Down By the Sea (2010) - Ashley Davis
- On Song 2: Red Sails in the Sunset , (2005) - Brian Kennedy

== See also ==
- Moya Brennan
- Hazel O'Connor
- Gearóid de Barra
