= Eyes of Innocence =

Eyes of Innocence may refer to:

- Eyes of Innocence (Brídín Brennan album), 2005
- Eyes of Innocence (Miami Sound Machine album), 1984
