= Xenogears Original Soundtrack =

1998 soundtrack

Soundtrack album by Yasunori Mitsuda
- Released: March 1, 1998
- Recorded: Green Bird Studio, Tokyo; Westland Studio, Dublin; Radio Studio, Sofia
- Genre: Video game music, Traditional music, Irish music
- Length: 144:05
- Label: DigiCube
- Producer: Yasunori Mitsuda

Yasunori Mitsuda chronology
Tobal No. 1 Original Soundtrack (1996)	Xenogears Original Soundtrack (1998)	Creid (1998)

Alternative cover
- The limited edition of the soundtrack features a different illustration on a keep case format.

Xenogears Original Soundtrack is the official soundtrack album for Square's role-playing video game Xenogears. It was composed by Yasunori Mitsuda and contains 44 tracks, including a Bulgarian choral song and two pieces performed by the Irish singer Joanne Hogg. Though the game was released in both Japan and North America, the album was published in Japan exclusively as a two-CD set on March 1, 1998.

The soundtrack was composed with strong traditional and Irish music influences, while the lyrics for the vocal tracks were written by the game's director Tetsuya Takahashi and its scenario writer Masato Kato. The soundtrack reached No. 55 in Japan and was generally well received by critics, though some disagreed on whether the album can be fully appreciated by non-players.

Two arranged versions of the soundtrack, Creid (1998) and Myth: The Xenogears Orchestral Album (2011), were also released by Mitsuda. A remastered version of the original album, Xenogears Original Soundtrack Revival Disc -the first and the last- (2018), was released by Square Enix along with a pair of concerts. The composer, along with Joanne Hogg, reprised their roles for the soundtrack to Xenogears's spiritual prequel Xenosaga Episode I: Der Wille zur Macht in 2002. Tribute albums were also produced by fans.

== Creation ==
=== Context ===
Xenogears entered development in 1996 and was released in 1998. The game's soundtrack was Yasunori Mitsuda's first major solo work, as his previous soundtracks were collaborations with other composers with the exception of the score to Radical Dreamers, which never saw an album release. Mitsuda worked closely with Masato Kato, the event planner and script writer of Xenogears, to compose the score. Mitsuda considered it hard at times to maintain his motivation throughout the whole two-year period, especially since he had to wait for the end to see the most dramatic tracks implemented. The game's director Tetsuya Takahashi did not initially think "music was all that important" compared to graphics, but eventually acknowledged its importance when he realized it could strongly enhance the expressivity of the images. Takahashi explained that without Mitsuda's music, he would not have been able to achieve his goals for the project.

The development team wanted to have a Western singer contribute to the score. Mitsuda initially had difficulties finding an artist that matched his vision, but eventually chose Joanne Hogg from the Celtic band Iona after stumbling upon their album The Book of Kells in a CD store and listening to the song "Chi-Rho". Hogg was enthusiastic in contributing as it was her first video game-related recording. She did not play the game for the project, however. Irish music was not well known in Japan at the time, but Mitsuda felt that a "Celtic boom" was about to hit the country. His prediction would later turn true with the popularity of the American film Titanic and the Irish stepdancing show Riverdance.

"Stars of Tears", one of the songs included on the soundtrack album, did not appear in the final version of the game. It was originally intended to play in a cut scene at the start of the game along with the main staff credits. The scene, however, was removed for pacing issues, as it would have made the combined opening movie and introduction scenes last roughly ten minutes. Another song on the soundtrack, "Small Two of Pieces ~Broken Shards~", was the first ending theme with sung lyrics to ever appear in a game developed by Square.

=== Composition and writing ===
The score contains 41 instrumental tracks, in addition to a choral track and two songs. According to Mitsuda, the music of Xenogears belongs to the traditional music genre. Though he first described it as stemming from "a world of [his] own imagining" rather than any specific country, he has also claimed a strong Irish or Celtic music influence. Mitsuda felt that composing for the game was very difficult due to the unfamiliarity of most Japanese with foreign traditionals, but expressed his wish for listeners of the soundtrack to open up to music from all over the world. His musical approach was to insert Celtic influences into "easy-to-listen-to" pop tracks, rather than making either "dense" Celtic music or simple background music. Other influences on the soundtrack include Arabic music on the desert town theme "Dazil, Town of Scorching Sands", and religious music, in keeping with the game's storyline. Mitsuda explained that he wanted music that "felt religious, but from a different angle".

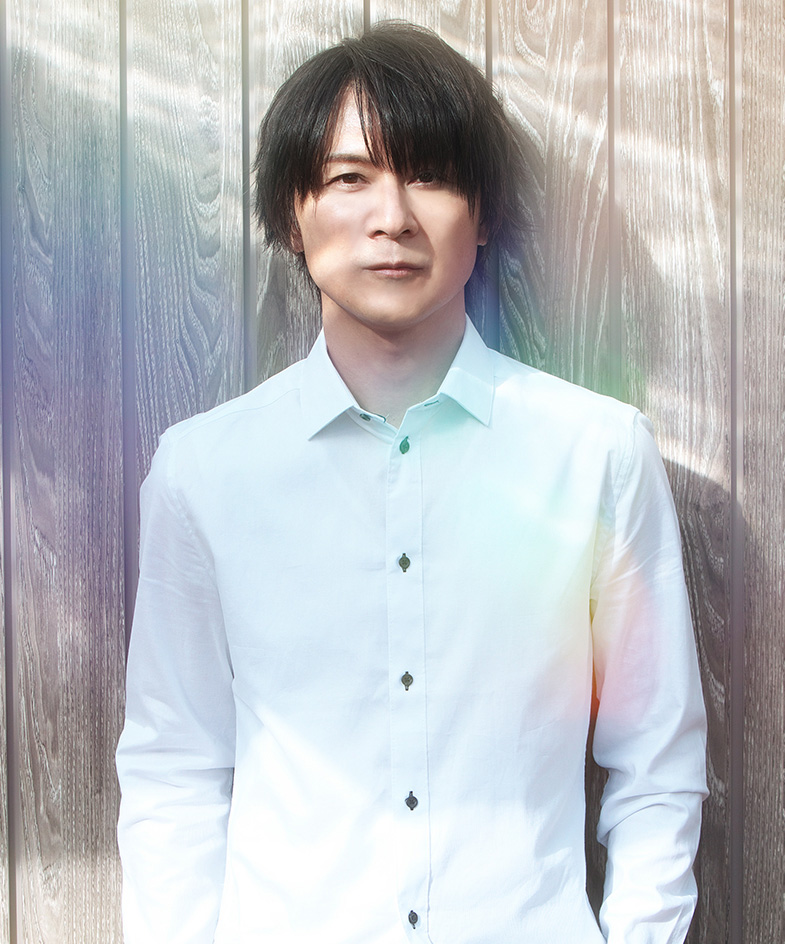
Yasunori Mitsuda composed the Xenogears soundtrack.

The opening movie of the game was produced before the corresponding track "Dark Dawn" was, and Mitsuda had to rearrange his composition after realizing some parts were out of synch with the frames by about a minute and a half. The choral track, titled "The Beginning and the End", was performed by a 41-voice choir named The Great Voices of Bulgaria and features lyrics written by Tetsuya Takahashi. His lyrics were translated from Japanese to English then to Bulgarian for the recording. Joanne Hogg sang in English on "Stars of Tears" and "Small Two of Pieces ~Broken Shards~". The latter took Mitsuda "an awfully long amount of time" just to compose the demo version. Masato Kato wrote the original lyrics for the two songs, and Hogg arranged them so that they would fit the melodies better and sound more Celtic. As with most of his previous soundtracks, Mitsuda composed a musical box arrangement of one of the main themes; in Xenogears' case, the track "Distant Promise" is the musical box version of "Small Two of Pieces".

=== Recording ===
The instrumental tracks of the score were programmed with the PlayStation sound module in Tokyo, Japan, while "The Beginning and the End" was recorded live in Sofia, Bulgaria. Hogg's songs were recorded in two days in Dublin, Ireland in 1996; they featured the Riverdance musician Davy Spillane on low whistle. When Titanic premiered in November 1997, Mitsuda noticed coincidental similarities between the film's ending song, Celine Dion's "My Heart Will Go On", and the Irish-themed music he was composing for Xenogears. He felt irritated and devoted himself to complete the soundtrack's recording before Titanic came out.

As with some of his previous soundtracks, Mitsuda would stay in the Japanese studio for long amounts of time and regularly fall asleep from overwork, while some melodies would first come to him in his dreams, such as that of "Ties of Sea and Flames". The composer collapsed during the soundtrack mastering process due to exhaustion, and had to be taken to the hospital by ambulance. The score involved in total nearly a hundred people. At one point, the music staff considered adding sound effects and voice narrations into the soundtrack album, but the idea was scrapped in favour of normal renditions of the game's music.

== Reception ==
"Small Two of Pieces ~Broken Shards~"
30-second sample from the ending song performed by Joanne Hogg.

The album reached No. 55 on the Japan Oricon charts. Soundtrack Central felt that Mitsuda "created a masterpiece in Xenogears", while RPGFan thought it was "most certainly his greatest achievement". On the other hand, one reviewer on Square Enix Music Online (unrelated to Square Enix) felt it did not represent Mitsuda's best album, saying that "what was an amazing soundtrack in its day ... has [not] stood the test of time very well." Reviewers disagreed whether the album could only be enjoyed by Xenogears players, or if it could be appreciated by a wider audience.

Several reviewers noted the diversity of styles present in the score. Soundtrack Central thought it was a "superb mix of epic adventure and traditional themes", while Square Enix Music Online appreciated the melding of futuristic, ethnic and religious themes, feeling that the recurring chanting sound effects made everything sound coherent. Critics also noticed similarities between some melodies and Mitsuda's previous work Chrono Trigger, though reviewers felt that those of Xenogears were more "widely based" and had a distinctive Celtic sound. The reviewers also praised the sound system used for the instrumental tracks as being up to the highest standard for the PlayStation console.

The emotional tracks were considered the strongest part of the score, and were praised for their ability to musically reflect the various locales and characters seen in the game. The opening track "Dark Dawn" was similarly lauded for showcasing all the influences of the soundtrack in a single composition. The battle themes were described as a weaker area and were called either effective or repetitive, with Square Enix Music Online noting that "Mitsuda has never been very good at composing interesting battle tracks". The final boss theme "The One Who Bares Fangs at God" received the most diverse comments, ranging from praises to criticism, due to its reliance on synth choral sound effects rather than a clear melody. The ending song "Small Two of Pieces" was received positively and, as Mitsuda predicted, compared to "My Heart Will Go On".

== Legacy ==
While in Ireland, Mitsuda also worked with Spillane and Maire Breatnach, another musician from Riverdance, to record an arranged album of Xenogears. Titled Creid and released in April 1998, the arranged album features 10 instrumental and vocal tracks from the soundtrack arranged in a more dominant Celtic style. "Stars of Tears" and "Small Two of Pieces" appear on the album as "Two Wings" and "Möbius" respectively, and are sung in Japanese by Tetsuko "Techie" Honma. A second arranged album, titled Myth: The Xenogears Orchestral Album, was released on February 23, 2011. The original soundtrack versions of "Stars of Tears" and "Small Two of Pieces" were featured on the 2001 compilation Square Vocal Collection, and again in 2009 on the compilation Colours of Light. The Xenogears soundtrack remains one of Mitsuda's favourite projects, and one of the works that he continues to feel a "special connection" to. For the game's 20th anniversary, a remastered version of the soundtrack titled Xenogears Original Soundtrack Revival Disc -the first and the last- was released on blu-ray on April 4, 2018. The remasters were overseen by Mitsuda, and the album contains a new arranged track by Mitsuda featuring a vocal performance by Irish choral ensemble Anúna. Contemporaneous with the album release, a concert of music titled Xenogears 20th Anniversary Concert -The Beginning and the End- was performed by the Xenogears Concert Special Band & Orchestra, Joanne Hogg, and Anúna on April 6 and 7 at the Maihama Amphitheater in Urayasu, Japan.

In 2002, Mitsuda composed the score to Monolith Soft's Xenosaga Episode I: Der Wille zur Macht, the spiritual prequel to Xenogears, also directed by Tetsuya Takahashi. Joanne Hogg returned to sing the soundtrack's vocal themes, while the instrumental tracks were performed by the London Philharmonic Orchestra. Monolith Soft did not ask Mitsuda and Hogg to reprise their roles for Episode II and Episode III, however.

A tribute album titled Xenogears Light: An Arranged Album, was published in limited quantities by the fan group OneUp Studios in 2005. The album features 20 tracks arranged from the Xenogears score and performed with acoustic instruments, such as piano, flute, guitar and violin. Another, unofficial album of remixes titled Humans + Gears was produced as a digital album by OverClocked Remix on October 19, 2009, consisting of 33 tracks on two "discs".

== Track listing ==
=== Disc one ===
No.	Title	Lyrics	Length
1.	"Dark Dawn" (冥き黎明)		4:51
2.	"Stars of Tears (Out Take)"	Masato Kato	2:56
3.	"Ties of Sea and Flames" (海と炎の絆)		3:08
4.	"Our Village is Number One" (おらが村は世界一)		4:03
5.	"Valley from Where the Wind is Born" (風のうまれる谷)		2:32
6.	"Distant Promise" (遠い約束)		1:51
7.	"Steel Giant" (鋼の巨人)		2:28
8.	"Black Moon Forest" (黒月の森)		4:02
9.	"Where the Eggs of Dreams Hatch" (夢の卵の孵るところ)		3:02
10.	"Slumber (Short Version)" (まどろみ（ショートバージョン）)		0:09
11.	"Dazil, Town of Scorching Sands" (熱砂の街ダジル)		3:27
12.	"Longing" (憧憬)		3:08
13.	"Grahf, Dark Conqueror" (グラーフ 闇の覇者)		3:50
14.	"Fuse" (導火線)		2:33
15.	"Traces Left from Warriors' Dreams" (つわものどもが夢のあと)		5:08
16.	"Gem Which Cannot Be Stolen" (盗めない宝石)		3:26
17.	"Aveh, Ancient Dance" (アヴェ いにしえの舞)		1:50
18.	"Invasion" (侵入)		3:12
19.	"Dance of Death" (死の舞踏)		2:38
20.	"In a Dark Sleep…" (暗き眠りに･･･)		0:22
21.	"The Gentle Wind Sings" (やさしい風がうたう)		4:09
22.	"We, the Wounded Shall Advance into the Light" (傷もてるわれら 光のなかを進まん)		1:56
23.	"Lost… Broken Shards" (lost… きしんだかけら)		1:05
24.	"Thames, the Spirit of a Man of the Sea" (タムズ 海の男の心意気)		3:49
25.	"Blue Traveller" (蒼き旅人)		3:12
Total length:			72:47

=== Disc two ===
No.	Title	Lyrics	Length
1.	"In a Prison of Remorse and Contentment" (悔恨と安らぎの檻にて)		2:42
2.	"Jaws of Ice" (氷の顎)		2:53
3.	"Crimson Knight" (紅蓮の騎士)		2:42
4.	"October Mermaid" (神無月の人魚)		4:27
5.	"The Wind is Calling, Shevat of the Azure Sky" (風が呼ぶ、蒼穹のシェバト)		3:31
6.	"The Heavens, Clouds and You" (大空と雲ときみと)		2:35
7.	"Gathering Stars in the Night Sky" (夜空一杯の星を集めて)		3:04
8.	"A Star's Tears, a Man's Sentiments" (星の涙、人の想い)		3:34
9.	"Soaring the Skies" (飛翔)		4:48
10.	"Wings" (翼)		2:20
11.	"Solaris, Heaven's Paradise" (天上の楽園ソラリス)		3:43
12.	"Slumber (Long Version)" (まどろみ（ロングバージョン）)		0:13
13.	"The One Who Is Torn Apart" (引き裂かれしもの)		5:06
14.	"Prayer, the Happiness People Wish for" (祈り、人の望みの喜びよ)		3:25
15.	"Premonition" (予感)		4:53
16.	"Awakening" (覚醒)		4:21
17.	"The One Who Bares Fangs at God" (神に牙むくもの)		6:05
18.	"The Beginning and the End" (最先と最後)	Tetsuya Takahashi	4:36
19.	"Small Two of Pieces ~Broken Shards~" (SMALL TWO OF PIECES～軋んだ破片～)	Masato Kato	6:20
Total length:			71:18

== Personnel ==
All information is taken from the Xenogears ending credits and the independent site Square Enix Music Online.

Main personnel

- Yasunori Mitsuda – composer, producer
- Hidenori Suzuki – sound programmer

"The Beginning and the End" personnel

- Peter Liondev – arranger
- Tetsuya Takahashi – lyrics
- The Great Voices of Bulgaria
  - Choir I – Snejanka Radoulova, Iordanka Alexieva, Nina Stanimirova, Tania Dosseva, Zlatina Ouzounova, Iva Gidikova, Tzvetanka Varimezova, Zoia Jeleva, Sylvana Pravtcheva, Hristiana Ignatova
  - Choir II – Galina Nedekova, Svetla Anastassova, Veronika Hristova, Svetla Tzetkova, Mariana Gueorguieva, Ivanka LuBomirova, Valentina Lavtcheva
  - Choir III – Maria Naydenova, Virgina Antikadjieva, Ludmila Stoyanova, Silviya Nenkova, Kouna Staykova, Daniela Entcheva
  - Choir IV – Hristinka Vassileva, Lora Beltcheva, Stoyanka Boneva, Hristina Lutova, Daniela Malamova, Donka Stoyanova
  - Tenors – Veliko Totev, Nikolay Varionov, Karlo Hristov, Peter Todorov, Alexander Alexandrov
  - Baritones – Benedikt Molhov, Dentcho Belev, Ivan Rendov
  - Bass – Teodor Hristov, Anton Donkov, Alexander Stoyanov, Kiril Stoyanov

"Stars of Tears" personnel

- Joanne Hogg – vocals
- Masato Kato – lyrics
- Davy Spillane – low whistle
- Hitoshi Watanabe – electric bass
- Hiroshi Hata – electric guitar, acoustic guitar
- Hidenobu Ootsuki – drums, percussion
- Yasunori Mitsuda – keyboards

"Small Two of pieces ~Broken Shards~" personnel

- Joanne Hogg – vocals
- Masato Kato – lyrics
- Davy Spillane – low whistle
- Anne-Marie O'Farrell – harp
- Hitoshi Watanabe – electric bass
- Hiroshi Hata – electric guitar, acoustic guitar
- Hidenobu Ootsuki – drums
- Yasunori Mitsuda – keyboards

== Release history ==
Region	Date	Label	Catalog
Japan	March 1, 1998	DigiCube	SSCX-10013
Japan	May 14, 2005	Square Enix	SQEX-10043~4
