= Moya Brennan =

Irish folk singer, songwriter and harpist (1952–2026)

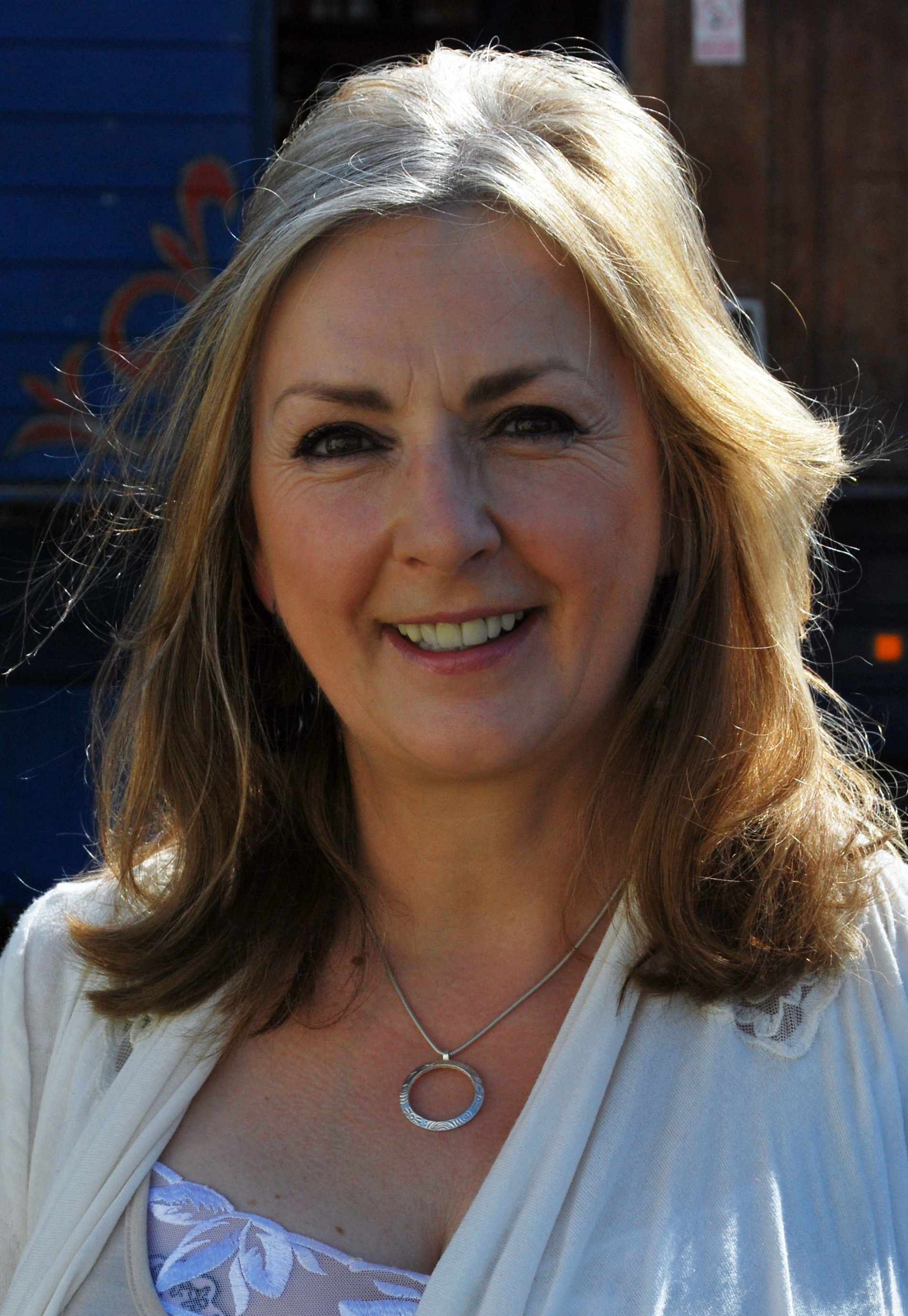
- Brennan backstage at the 2011 Glastonbury Festival

Background information
- Also known as: Máire Brennan; Máire Jarvis
- Born: Máire Philomena Ní Bhraonáin; 4 August 1952; Dublin, County Dublin, Ireland
- Origin: Gweedore, County Donegal, Ireland
- Died: 13 April 2026 (aged 73) Gaoth Dobhair, County Donegal, Ireland
- Genres: Irish Traditional; Celtic; folk; new-age; contemporary Christian music
- Occupations: Singer; songwriter; producer; harpist
- Instruments: Vocals; harp; piano
- Years active: 1970–2026
- Labels: Atlantic; BMG; Word; BEO; Universal
- Formerly of: Clannad; T with the Maggies
- Website: moyabrennan.com

Moya Brennan (born Máire Philomena Ní Bhraonáin; (Note: Irish pronunciation: [ˈmˠaːɾʲə n̠ʲiː ˈwɾˠiːn̪ˠaːnʲ].) 4 August 1952 – 13 April 2026), also known as Máire Brennan, was an Irish folk singer, songwriter, harpist, and philanthropist. She began performing professionally in 1970 when her family formed the band Clannad. Brennan released her first solo album in 1992 called Máire, a successful venture. In 1999, she collaborated with Chicane on the single "Saltwater", which reached the top ten in multiple countries and was certified Gold by the British Phonographic Industry (BPI).

Brennan received a Grammy Award from five nominations and won an Emmy Award. She recorded music for several film soundtracks, including Titanic, To End All Wars and King Arthur. Following her death in April 2026, the BBC estimated her record sales worldwide to have been in the millions.

== Early life, family and education ==
Máire Philomena Ní Bhraonáin was born on 4 August 1952 in Dublin, to Leo Brennan and Maire (nee Ní Dhugain). Her parents eloped from County Donegal to marry in County Louth. Máire grew up as the eldest child of a musical family in the remote parish of Gweedore (Gaoth Dobhair), a Gaeltacht area in County Donegal, where Irish was her first language and traditional music continued to flourish. Her mother was a music teacher and her father was a member of a cabaret band, with whom she performed as a child.

Moya was the eldest of nine children. She has four sisters, Deirdre, Eithne (better known as Enya), Olive and Brídín, and four brothers, Ciarán, Pól, Leon and Bartley. She and her sisters learn piano from their mother and a sister in Falcarragh, County Donegal.

She took part in community events and singing competitions, and often sang with her siblings in the family pub, Leo's Tavern, or Tabhairne Leo, in the village of Meenaleck, a short distance from the family home, which became "the hub of the local community" with live music every night.

== Clannad (1970–2024) ==
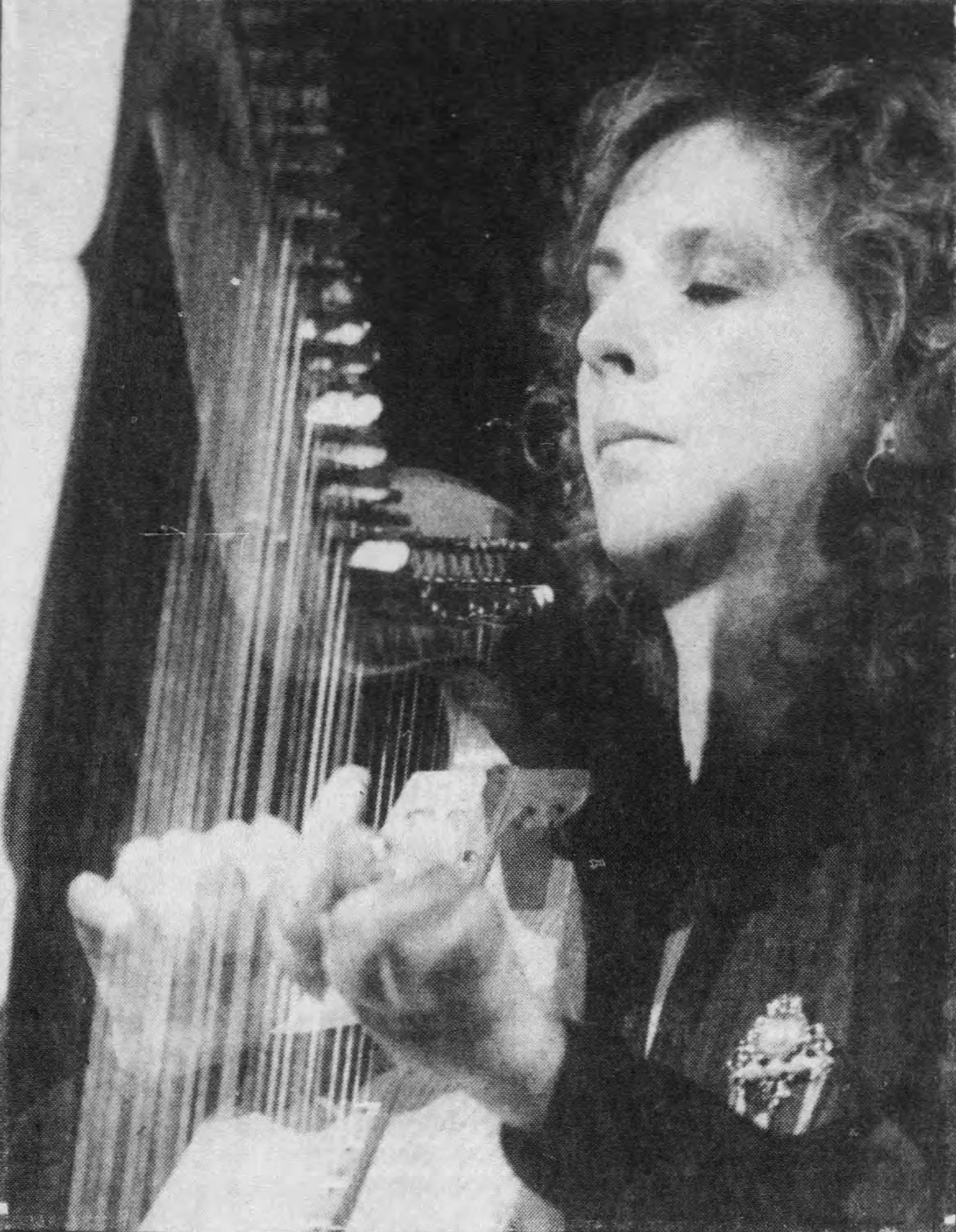
Brennan performing with Clannad in Boston, 1988

In 1970, Brennan joined her two brothers Pól and Ciarán, and their mother's twin brothers Noel and Pádraig Ó Dúgáin, eventually forming the music group Clannad. They were introduced on television by Irish musician and broadcaster Tony MacMahon. After a decade of being among the world's foremost Irish musical groups, Clannad saw chart success in 1982 with the album Magical Ring. She recorded 17 albums with Clannad and won a Grammy, a BAFTA and an Ivor Novello award with the quintet. Her sister, Eithne Ní Bhraonáin, spent a couple of years with Clannad in the early 1980s, and went on to pursue a successful solo career as Enya.

Following Clannad's 2008 reunion tour, it was announced that Brennan would be working on a new unplugged album with the group, for release in 2009, but that never came to fruition.

== Solo career ==
=== Máire and Chicane collaboration (1992–1999) ===
Brennan released her first solo album, Máire, in 1992 on Atlantic Records. Misty Eyed Adventures on BMG followed three years later. In 1998, Brennan signed with Word Records and released Perfect Time. Whisper to the Wild Water followed a year later. 'Whisper to the Wild Water' was nominated for the Grammy Award for Best New Age Album in 2001. Brennan was managed by her husband Tim Jarvis and her brother Leon Ó Braonáin. Her music was usually classified as new age or Celtic. She accepted the Celtic label, but at times indicated slight discomfort with being seen as "new age", as much of her music was strongly Christian and several of her songs were centred on maintaining a relationship with Jesus. Some of her songs showed influences from her Roman Catholic upbringing, or were related to her views concerning Mary, the mother of Jesus. In 1999, she collaborated with dance artist Chicane in performing the vocals on the single "Saltwater".

=== Autobiography and film scores (1999–2006) ===
"Against the Wind" (1992)
Most successful song from her debut album, Máire.

"Perfect Time" (1998)
Title track from her 1998 release Perfect Time.

In 2000, her autobiography, The Other Side of the Rainbow, was published. She performed her song "Perfect Time" live at World Youth Day in Rome in front of crowds of pilgrims and Pope John Paul II. There were 2.1 million people present, the largest crowd ever gathered in the Northern Hemisphere. She considered this an honour as she believed in mutual respect among Christians. Moya also recorded on the event's album, One. She recorded a duet with Booley, now known as Duke Special. The song, titled "Peace Has Broken Out", was about the Troubles in Ireland. In 2008 or 2009 she legally changed her name by deed poll to Moya Brennan. She released an album under this name entitled Two Horizons in 2003 on her new label, Universal.

In film, she was the featured vocalist on King Arthur (2004). She co-wrote the title theme, "Tell Me Now (What You See)", with Hans Zimmer and wrote additional music score for To End All Wars (2001). In 1995, she duetted with Shane MacGowan on "You're the One" for the film Circle of Friends.

On 17 March 2004, she performed at the Speaker's Luncheon on Capitol Hill in front of President George W. Bush and Irish dignitaries. During the World Youth Day 2005 in Cologne, she performed with Pope Benedict XVI in the Vigil in front of a million people. She appeared on the official WYD CD, Building on World.

=== An Irish Christmas and Signature (2006–2013) ===
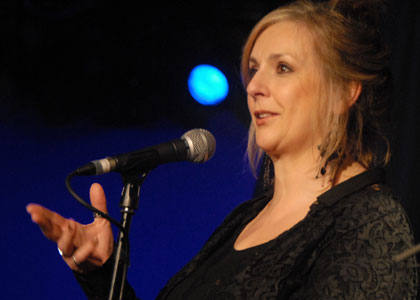
Brennan performing in 2006

In 2006, Brennan released a Christmas album entitled An Irish Christmas, although it was originally planned to have the title Love Came Down. A year later, she released her album Signature, which she described as a collection of snapshots of her life.

While touring this album in 2007 and 2008, Brennan recorded several collaborations and guest vocals on albums by Iona, Joanne Hogg and with Grand Canal on Ireland's Official Olympic Anthem, "Green to Gold". All three recordings were in aid of charities. Her 2008–2009 live album Heart Strings was recorded with the Royal Liverpool Philharmonic and Julie Feeney, and she toured extensively in the Netherlands, Germany, Ireland and England to promote the album.

In 2009, Brennan recorded the soundtrack on Maryland Public Television's documentary film Intrepid Journal, which documented 50 years of American foreign policy from World War II to the September 11 attacks. In April 2010, she released a new studio album with harpist and live band member Cormac de Barra, My Match Is a Makin'. Brennan announced that she was working on an album of hymns, possibly for 2010 release, and would release a new acoustic music album with Clannad in 2010 or 2011. The new Clannad album was slated for release in September 2013. Brennan was the featured headliner for the Atlanta Celtic Christmas concert, recorded live by Georgia Public Broadcasting on 18–19 December 2010. This annual festive event at Emory University's Schwartz Center spanned music and dance from Irish, Scottish, and Appalachian traditions.

Brennan appeared on the album "Excalibur III – The Origins" written by Alan Simon, a musician from Brittany. She sang on the tracks "The Origins Part I and II", "Incantations" and "Sacred Lands". In July 2012 she went to Brocéliande in Brittany, where she performed as soloist before performing at the concert "Excalibur III – The Origins". She was scheduled to perform at the National Geographic Society in Washington DC on 17 March 2012.

=== Voices & Harps – Affinity (2013–2026) ===
In 2013, Brennan released a new studio album, Voices & Harps – Affinity in collaboration with harpist Cormac de Barra, as a follow-up to the album 'Voices & Harps' which was released in 2011. It contained new music composed by Brennan and de Barra, several traditional tunes in Irish and a cover of the Christopher Cross song "Sailing", which was the album's lead single.

Brennan released Canvas in 2017, her first solo album in almost a decade. Co-written by her two children, Aisling and Paul, the album was released on 24 February 2017 and was supported by a UK, Irish and European tour in 2018. In 2020, Brennan was part of an Irish collective of female singers and musicians called "Irish Women in Harmony" who recorded a version of the song "Dreams" in aid of the charity Safe Ireland, which dealt with domestic abuse that had risen significantly during the COVID-19 lockdown.

In May 2026, Brennan was featured on the song "Tobar an tSaoil - The Well of the World" by Dervish, taken from the latter's album The Great Irish Song Book Vol 2: Poets and Storytellers.

== Artistry ==
=== Moya Brennan Band ===
Brennan toured with a large band of musicians who had each recorded solo projects in the past or had recorded with their own bands. They included harpist and television presenter Cormac de Barra. Between August 2008 and February 2009, two new members including Irish singer Daithí Rua joined the band, the first changes since the Two Horizons Tour. In 2012, Moya's daughter, Aisling Jarvis, became a permanent member. Aisling joined Brennan on all her solo tours, and her project with de Barra, "Voices & Harps".

==== Band members ====
- Cormac de Barra
- Sinéad Madden
- Aisling Jarvis
- Éamonn Galldubh
- Fionán de Barra
- Dave Curley
- Paul Byrne
- Yoshi Izumi
- Paul Jarvis
- Hughie Boyle
- Will Keating
- Sam Jackson
- Daithí Rua
- Tiarnán Ó Duinnchinn
- Máire Breatnach
- Rob Jones
- Ewan Cowley
- Feargal Murray
- Deirdre Brennan
- Tim Jarvis
- Éamonn de Barra
- Lia Wright
- Clare Friel
- Neil Kennedy
- Cathal Ó'Curráin
- Aran Sheehy

=== Legacy and recognition ===
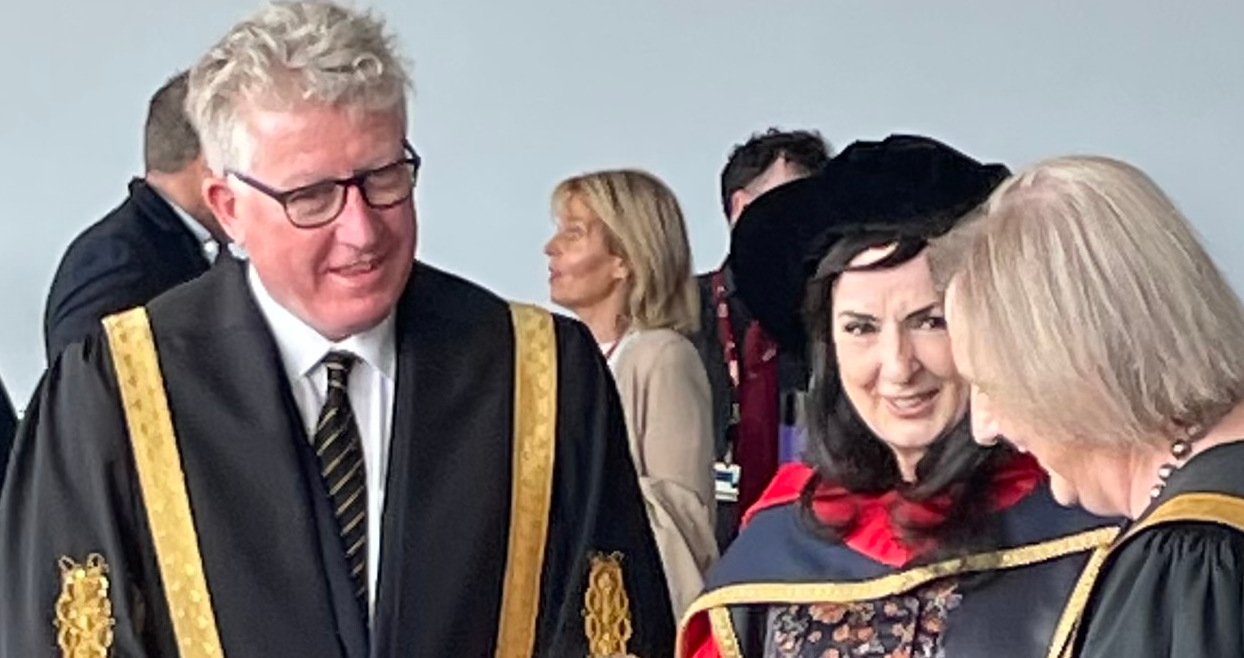
Moya Brennan after receipt of an honorary doctorate from DCU, with the university's president and chancellor, May 2022

Brennan and Clannad have been credited with the creation of contemporary Celtic music. They are held in high esteem for their contribution in bringing new life to old Irish songs. They have been compared to Seán Ó Riada, in that they brought the Irish language into popular culture through their music. One critic said: "Clannad's music offers a terrific fusion between traditional and modern influences." U2 singer Bono, who duetted with Brennan on the Clannad song "In a Lifetime", said: "I think Máire has one of the greatest voices the human ear has ever experienced." Brennan's voice has been described as a "breathy soprano".

In 2019, Brennan was awarded the RTÉ Radio 1 Folk Awards. Her contributions were recognised with the award of an honorary doctorate by Dublin City University.

Moya Brennan was announced as Donegal Person of The Year 2023 on 10 February 2024. This followed the 2022 award given to the victims of the Creeslough disaster, for which she co-hosted the Together for Creeslough concert in January 2023, alongside Mairéad Ní Mhaonaigh, who won the award in 2009. Brennan's inauguration ceremony took place on 6 April 2024 at a gala ball held at The Bonnington Hotel in Dublin.

== Personal life and death ==
In the 1980s, Brennan was married to musician Pat Farrell for 18 months; the marriage ended when she suffered a miscarriage. In 1990 she married British photographer Tim Jarvis, with whom she had two children. In 2009 she changed her name to Moya Brennan by deed poll.

She wrote an autobiography called The Other Side of the Rainbow in 2000, in which she recalled her upbringing as the eldest of nine siblings in rural Donegal. Along with the highs of success in the music business, she also recounted low periods where alcohol, drugs and an abortion made her re-evaluate her life. She emerged from her "dark years" as a committed Christian with rekindled faith.

In 2016, Brennan was diagnosed with pulmonary fibrosis. Although she lived in Dublin and engaged in many public events and Irish media contributions in the decade following her diagnosis, she was aware of her condition deteriorating in 2025, being told that she had three years to live. She died at her home in Gaoth Dobhair, County Donegal, on 13 April 2026, at the age of 73.

== Philanthropy ==
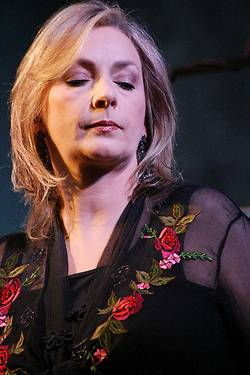
Brennan performing in New York, 2008

=== Christian Blind Mission ===
In 2003, Brennan became Goodwill Ambassador to Christian Blind Mission Ireland (CBM). Her first trip was to Congo-Kinshasa with a group of five others. Violence caused Moya and her team to flee civil unrest and they were evacuated to Kenya. She promised to return to the Congo, which she did in 2005 to airlift three children from isolated jungle villages to Kinshasa.

In that same year, she travelled to Rwanda, where she kept a diary of her experiences. In 2005, she made an Irish-language documentary for TG4 during her visit to Congo, which was broadcast in 2007, and again in 2008 on both TG4 and RTÉ.

Brennan travelled to shanty-towns in Brazil and performed at a fund-raising event in the country with Assíria Nascimento in 2007. From there she travelled to Belize for the opening of a school for abused children, run by the Liberty Foundation and backed by CBM. At the opening, Brennan brought together the Belizean Prime Minister Said Musa, Minister of Finance, Leader of the Opposition and UK Conservative Party member and businessman with extensive business interests in Belize, Michael Ashcroft, Baron Ashcroft. The following year, she travelled to Tanzania and played a major role in publicising the missions of the charity. She also performed concerts worldwide with other Christian Blind Mission Goodwill Ambassadors from Europe.

=== Nature preservation ===
With Clannad, Brennan recorded numerous songs about the protection needed for the landscapes of Ireland, and about the devastation of pollution around the world. The first song on this subject was recorded for their debut album and was called "An Pháirc". She recorded songs on this topic throughout her solo career, including "Big Yellow Taxi". In July 2005, alongside poet Cathal Ó Searcaigh and locals of County Donegal, she took part in a protest against the installation of electric cables across the county because of the harm it could do to people and the landscape.

=== Other appointments and music ===
In 1985 Brennan and her band members in Clannad donated their song "Almost Seems (Too Late To Turn)" to Children in Need. It became the British charity appeal's first official single. In 1986, Brennan performed with Bono, Bob Geldof, Chris de Burgh and Clannad for Self Aid. Brennan and Clannad had long been supporters of Amnesty International and contributed their single "Rí na Cruinne" to the organisation. Brennan performed at benefit concerts in Ireland and England, notably alongside Van Morrison in 1996.

Brennan appeared on albums with other artists, including "Raphael's Journey" by Joanne Hogg in 2008, "Songs for Luca" and "Songs for Luca 2" by Iona, and the official song for Ireland's 2008 Olympic Team, "Green to Gold". She donated her b-side "Ceolfaidh Mé" to the Field of Hope album, which also featured Bono and The Corrs. She recorded a song under her birth name "Máire Ní Bhraonáin" on the 2009 Ceol Cheann Dubhrann album with Manus Lunny to raise funds for Áislann Rann na Feirste and Scoil Náisiúnta Rann na Feirste.

== Discography ==
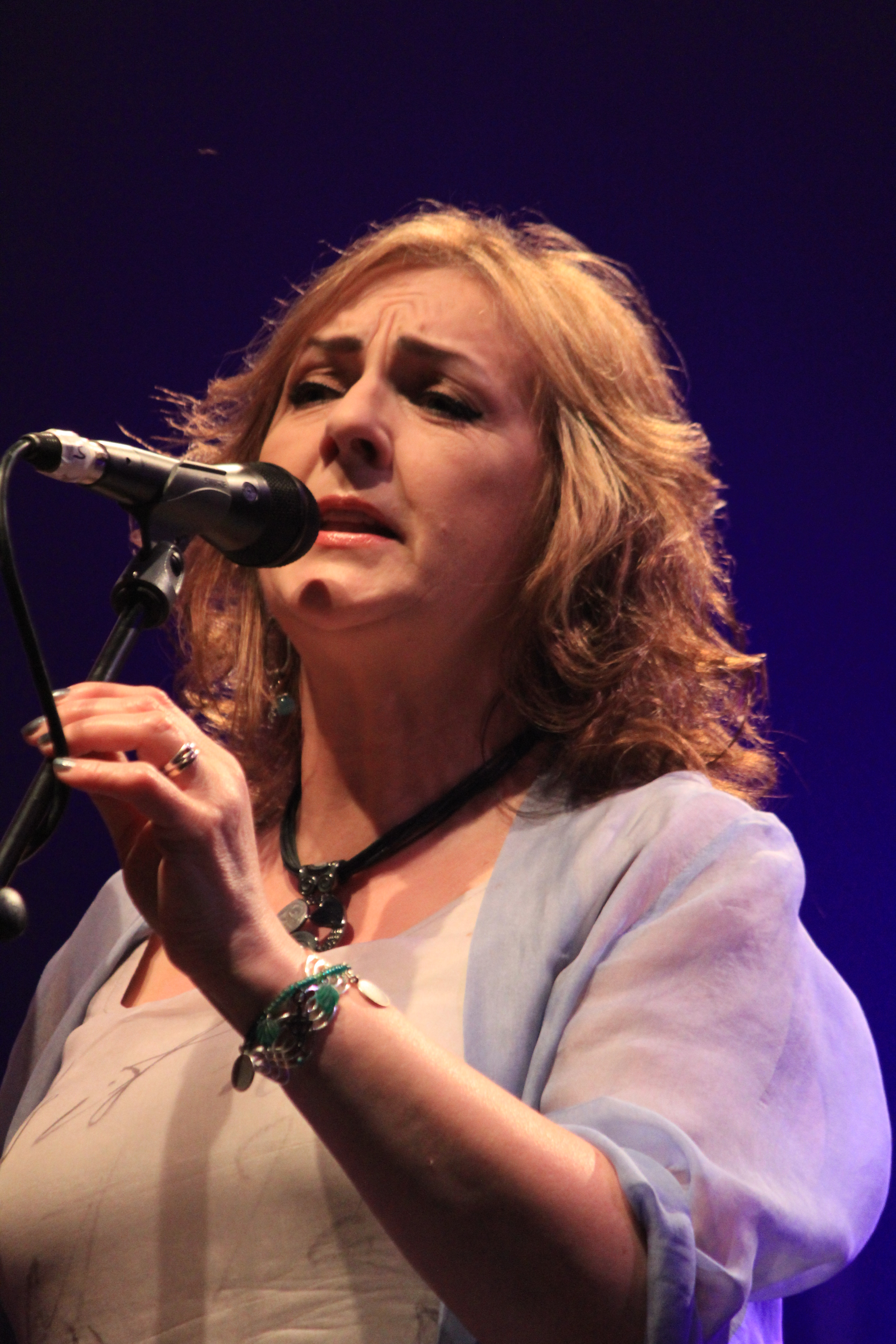
Brennan performing with Clannad at Lorient in 2013

=== Studio albums ===
Information from AllMusic

- 1992 – Máire
- 1994 – Misty Eyed Adventures
- 1998 – Perfect Time
- 1999 – Whisper to the Wild Water
- 2003 – Two Horizons
- 2005 – An Irish Christmas
- 2006 – Signature
- 2010 – My Match Is a Makin' (with Cormac de Barra)
- 2010 – T with the Maggies (with T with the Maggies)
- 2011 – Voices & Harps (with Cormac de Barra)
- 2013 – Affinity (with Cormac de Barra)
- 2017 – Canvas
- 2019 – Timeless (with Cormac de Barra)
- 2023 – Nollaig Ghaelach (newly recorded songs from “An Irish Christmas”)
- 2024 – Voices & Harps IV (with Cormac de Barra)

=== Live albums ===
- 2005 – Óró – A Live Session
- 2007 – Signature Special Tour Edition
- 2008 – Heart Strings

== Bibliography ==
- 1991 – A Woman's Voice

Eddie Rowley in conversation with Máire Brennan

- 2000 – Ireland: Landscapes of God's Peace, Máire Brennan

sometimes called God of Peace

- 2001 – The Other Side of the Rainbow, Máire Brennan with Angela Little

Later subtitled: The Autobiography of the Voice of Clannad
