= Sinéad Madden =

- Born: County Galway, Ireland
- Genres: Folk, pop, alternative, Celtic
- Occupations: Singer-songwriter, fiddler, music teacher
- Website: Official website Official Myspace

Sinéad Madden (born in County Galway, Ireland) is an Irish singer-songwriter and fiddle player, best known as a member of the Moya Brennan band. She also teaches at Waltons New School of Music in Dublin.

== Early life ==
Sinéad Madden was born in County Galway, but moved to County Mayo aged 6. At the age of 7 she began playing traditional fiddle. As a young adult, Madden went on to study both classical piano and violin while performing at sessions in local pubs.

== Introduction to professional music ==
Sinéad moved to Dublin in 1994 to experience college life and the rock scene in the city at the time. It was in that year that she met Ewan Cowley who had worked with Clannad and Moya Brennan. In the summer of 1998, Madden met Moya through Cowley and has been a member of her live band since. Madden has also performed alongside The Drifters frontman Ben E. King, Peter Baxter and is also a member of Irish-Australian band Tyrella.

== Solo career ==
As well as recording alongside the aforementioned artists, Madden released her début album, Honey Promises in May 2009. The album features Moya Brennan and Cormac de Barra. Sinead also played live with Def Leppard in 2012.

== Discography ==
=== Solo albums ===
- 2009 – Honey Promises

=== Moya Brennan ===
- 2003 – Two Horizons
- 2005 – Óró - A Live Session
- 2005 – An Irish Christmas
- 2006 – Signature
- 2007 – Signature Special Tour Edition
- 2008 – Heart Strings
