= Millennial Fair =

Millennial Fair may refer to:

- Millennial Fair, a location in Chrono Trigger
- Millennial Fair, a musical ensemble that recorded Creid
