= Perfect Time =

Studio album by Moya Brennan
- Released: April 1998
- Recorded: Dublin, Ireland, 1998
- Genre: Celtic rock, Christian rock
- Label: Word Records
- Producer: Denis Woods, Moya Brennan

Moya Brennan chronology
Misty Eyed Adventures (1995)	Perfect Time (1998)	Whisper to the Wild Water (1999)

Singles from Perfect Time
- 1. "Heal This Land" Released: 1998; 2. "The Big Rock" Released: 1998; 3. "Perfect Time" Released: 1998; 4. "The Light on the Hill" Released: 1999

Perfect Time is a music album by Irish musician Máire Brennan (now known as Moya Brennan). This recording was for the Word Records company. It was released in 1998.

Recordings were made in Ireland during 1998:

- Mo Studio, Dublin, Ireland – (Engineer Chris O'Brien)
- The Production Suite, Dublin, Ireland – (Engineer Chris O'Brien)

== Track listing ==
1. "The Big Rock" – 3:04
2. "Perfect Time" – 4:46
3. "The Light on the Hill" – 4:02
4. "Na Páistí (The Children)" – 2:39
5. "Heal This Land" – 3:45
6. "Song of David" (Psalm 67) – 4:08
7. "Our World" – 6:10
8. "Doon Well" – 3:57
9. "Grá Dé (The Love of God)" – 6:25
10. "The Big Rock" (Instrumental Version) – 3:03

== Personnel ==
=== Band ===
- Máire Brennan – Vocals, Harp, Keyboards
- Dee Brennan – Bodhran, Vocals (on Na Páistí)
- Graham Murphy – Keyboards
- Denis Woods – Keyboards
- Gerry O'Conner – Fiddle
- Anthony Drennan – Guitars
- David Downes – Uilleann pipes, Low Whistles
- Cór Mhuire na Doirí Bige the choir of St. Mary's Church, Derrybeg, Donegal – Choir (on Song of David)
- Baba Brennan – Choir Leader

== Singles ==
=== Commercial singles ===
1. "Heal This Land"
2. "The Big Rock"

=== Promotional singles ===
1. "Perfect Time"
2. "The Light on the Hill"

== Release details ==
- 1998, UK, Word Records MCD 60052, Release Date ? April 1998, CD
- 1998, UK, Word Records MCC 50052, Release Date ? April 1998, Cassette
- 1998, UK, Word Records 7019965601, Release Date ? April 1998, CD
- 1998, USA, Word Records MCD 69143, Release Date ? April 1998, CD
- 1998, USA, Word Records 7019965504, Release Date ? April 1998, Cassette
- 1998, Japan, Columbia Records ESCA 7426, Release Date ? April 1998, Cassette
