= Myth: The Xenogears Orchestral Album =

Soundtrack album by Yasunori Mitsuda
- Released: February 23, 2011
- Recorded: Bulgaria, London
- Genre: Video game music, Traditional music, Irish music
- Length: 51:33
- Language: Bulgarian, English
- Label: Square Enix
- Producer: Yasunori Mitsuda

Yasunori Mitsuda chronology
Gekijouban Inazuma Eleven Saikyou Gundan Ogre Shuurai Original Soundtrack (2010)	Myth: The Xenogears Orchestral Album (2011)	Inazuma Eleven TV Anime Hot Blood Soundtrack! Volume 3 (2011)

Myth: The Xenogears Orchestral Album is an arranged soundtrack to Square Enix's role-playing video game Xenogears. It is the third soundtrack to the game, after Xenogears Original Soundtrack and Creid, another arranged album, both released in 1998. Myth was composed by the game's composer Yasunori Mitsuda and arranged by Mitsuda, Youki Yamamoto, Sachiko Miyano, and Natsumi Kameoka. The album contains 14 tracks, including a song performed by the Irish singer Joanne Hogg, and has a length of 51:33. The orchestration was performed by the Bulgarian Symphony Orchestra, conducted by Yamamoto. The album was announced in October 2010, and was released on February 23, 2011, by Square Enix. A vinyl record version of the album was released on April 1, 2011, consisting of six tracks from the full album.

Reviewers were consistent in their praises and criticism of the album. They noted the high production values and the quality of the original compositions and the performance of the orchestra. They also felt that the later tracks in the album were notably weaker than the early tracks, that the arrangements in general did not stray far from the source material, and that several of the track choices did not seem to fit as well as orchestral renditions as others.

== Creation ==
Xenogears composer Yasunori Mitsuda announced plans to create an album of orchestral arrangements of music from that game on October 6, 2010, via his Twitter account. Mitsuda had previously released two albums of music from the game, both in 1998, the year the game was released—Xenogears Original Soundtrack, a soundtrack album for the game, and Creid, an album of arranged music inspired by Celtic folk music and Japanese rock. He has said that he decided to make the album due to the emotions that he and fans still felt about the game 13 years after its release, which led him to want to commemorate that. The music of Xenogears is particularly close to Mitsuda, as it was the last soundtrack that he worked on for Square Enix—the first video game company he worked for—and he knew that he would be leaving when he composed the soundtrack for the game. He has said that he had been considering the idea of a Xenogears orchestral album for six or seven years prior to starting on it, but until then did not have both the opportunity to work on the project and the confidence in his own abilities as an orchestrator to make the album sound as he wished.

When the album was announced, Square Enix opened a poll for members of their fan club to vote on tracks that they would like to see in the album. The poll was closed on October 20 and in December the top ten results were published. Eight of these were eventually included in the final album—"Crimson Knight" and "Awakening" were excluded. Although Mitsuda tried to put as many of the suggestions into the album as he felt were appropriate, he only included the top three "without thinking". He was limited in his track selection due to many of the original tunes sharing common themes, while he wanted only one instance of a given theme to be present on Myth. The track list was initially set to feature ten tracks, but was later expanded to fourteen.

The album was recorded with the Bulgarian Symphony Orchestra in Bulgaria and was mixed in London in December, 2010. Of the fourteen tracks, Mitsuda only arranged one for orchestration; Youki Yamamoto, who also conducted the orchestra, arranged three, Sachiko Miyano arranged two, and Natsumi Kameoka of Mitsuda's Procyon Studio arranged seven. Joanne Hogg reprised her role as the vocalist for "Small Two of Pieces"; however, the lyrics were not re-recorded. Instead, her original performance from the game's soundtrack was used. The title "Myth" was chosen by Mitsuda so that "this work may become everyone’s myth", as he wanted the music to remind listeners of "fond memories and thoughts of the world of" the original game and soundtrack.

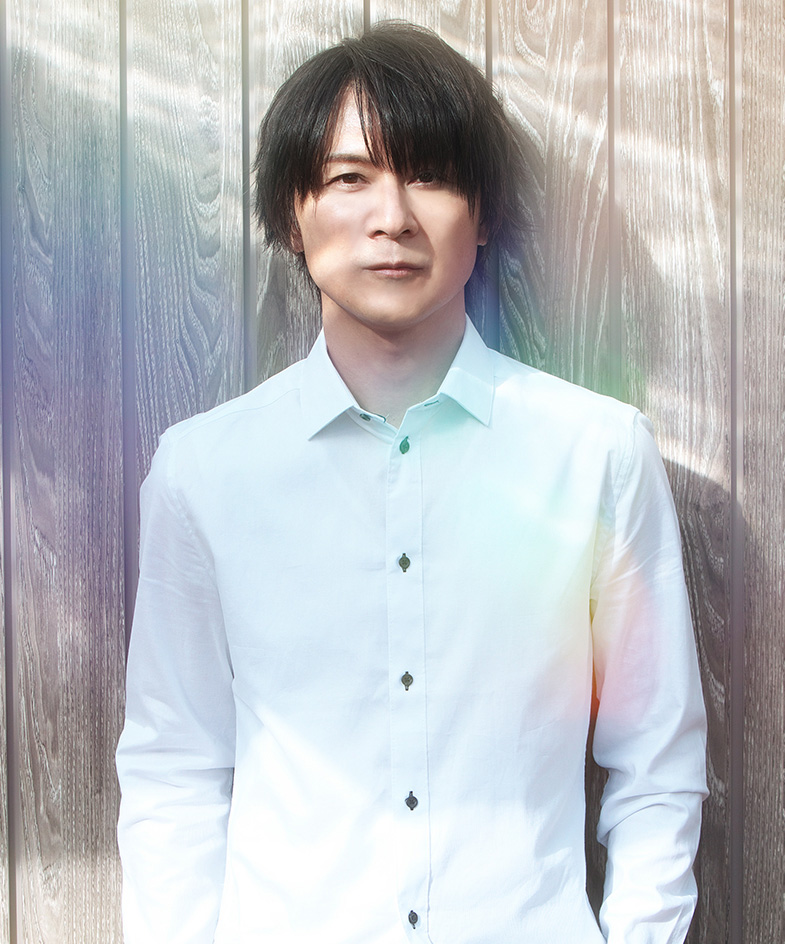
Composer and producer Yasunori Mitsuda

The album was released on February 23, 2011. It contains 14 tracks with a total length of 51:33. The album was published by Square Enix and has a catalog number of SQEX-10230. The physical release of the album was only in Japan, though it was additionally released digitally on iTunes outside of the country. Additionally, on April 1, 2011, Square Enix published a vinyl record version of the album. This version contains six tracks, corresponding to tracks 1, 3, 4, 8, 12, and 13 from the full album. It has a length of 28:33 and the catalog number SE-M0004. Ringtones for "Village Pride", "A Distant Promise", "Dark Dawn" and "Small Two of Pieces" were released on January 28, 2011. Mitsuda noted that there might be a second orchestral album in the future if the first was successful; he described himself as "very keen on the idea of producing the second album".

== Reception ==
In his review of the album, Connary Fagen of Original Sound Version concluded that it was "part masterpiece, part phone-in." He felt that the majority of the album, especially the first two-thirds, was composed of strong, high-quality tracks. However, he felt that a few pieces, in particular the final three tracks, were "underwhelming". He described the overall effect as "a row of books with only one bookend" as the album in his opinion did not have a strong or defined ending. Ben Schweitzer of Square Enix Music Online said that while "the album as a whole is worthwhile", that it was "in some ways like a wasted opportunity." He felt that the majority of the tracks were short orchestrations that did not attempt to stray from the original material, which in his opinion meant that they were left to stand on the merits of the original compositions rather than their own merits. He did note that the quality of the orchestra was high, and called out "Cage of Remorse and Relief" and "Soaring" as especially well done.

Myth was reviewed by two separate critics from RPGFan. Eric Farand praised the album, saying that half of the songs were great and the other half were "pretty good"; he called out "Village Pride" as one of the best. Like Fagen he felt that the second half of the album contained several tracks that were "forgettable, phoned-in or a poor song selection for this album". He agreed with Schweitzer that the majority of the arrangements did not deviate much from the original compositions, but said that it was what he expected and wanted from an orchestral arrangement album. Stephen Meyerink, in his review, was less receptive to the album, saying that "It's good. It's not great." He praised the technical quality of the performances, especially those of the string section of the orchestra, but criticized the lack of originality in the arrangements. He noted "Soaring" and "Bonds of Sea and Flames" as some of the few tracks he felt brought something unique to the arrangement. He felt that while the original compositions were strong, that the album felt "rushed" and "phoned-in" with poor track selection, made more to tie in with the release of Xenogears on the PlayStation Network that year than for the love of the music.

== Track listing ==
For many of the tracks, the English names used in the iTunes release are different from the literal translation of the Japanese names, which were used for the original soundtrack. When the literal translation differs, it is marked after the Japanese name.

No.	Title	Lyrics	Arranger	Length
1.	"Dark Dawn" (冥き黎明)		Natsumi Kameoka	5:05
2.	"Village Pride" (おらが村は世界一, lit. Our Village is Number One)		Youki Yamamoto	3:42
3.	"Soaring" (飛翔)		Kameoka	4:26
4.	"Intangible Treasure" (盗めない宝石, lit. Unstealable Jewel)		Kameoka	4:01
5.	"Deadly Dance" (死の舞踏, lit. Dance of Death)		Kameoka	2:50
6.	"Shevat -The Wind Calls-" (風が呼ぶ、蒼穹のシェバト, lit. The Wind Calls, Shevat of the Azure Sky)		Yamamoto	2:23
7.	"October Mermaid" (神無月の人魚)		Sachiko Miyano	4:42
8.	"Bonds of Sea and Flames" (海と炎の絆)		Miyano	4:38
9.	"Windy Song" (やさしい風がうたう, lit. The Gentle Wind Sings)		Yamamoto	3:26
10.	"Cage of Remorse and Relief" (悔恨と安らぎの檻にて, lit. In a Prison of Remorse and Contentment)		Yasunori Mitsuda	2:37
11.	"Lost… -Screeching Shards-" (lost… きしんだかけら)		Kameoka	1:06
12.	"The Beginning and the End" (最先と最後)	Tetsuya Takahashi	Mitsuda	4:11
13.	"Small Two of Pieces"	Masato Kato	Kameoka	6:12
14.	"A Distant Promise" (遠い約束)		Kameoka	2:14

== Personnel ==
- Yasunori Mitsuda – composer, arranger, orchestrator, producer
- Youki Yamamoto – arranger, orchestrator, conductor
- Sachiko Miyano – arranger, orchestrator
- Natsumi Kameoka – arranger, orchestrator
- The Bulgarian Symphony Orchestra – orchestra
- Joanne Hogg – vocals on "Small Two of Pieces"
- Tetsuya Takahashi – lyrics on "The Beginning and the End"
- Masato Kato – lyrics on "Small Two of Pieces"
