= Máire (album) =

Studio album by Moya Brennan
- Released: June 1992
- Recorded: 1992
- Studios: Castle Sound Studio, Pencaitland
- Genre: Celtic rock
- Length: 45:10
- Labels: BMG Records (UK); Atlantic (USA)
- Producers: Calum Malcolm, Dónal Lunny

Moya Brennan chronology
Máire (1992)	Misty Eyed Adventures (1995)

Máire is the debut album by Irish musician Máire Brennan, released in 1992.

== Recording ==
A promotional video directed by the Douglas Brothers was made to accompany the single "Against the Wind". The song also appears on Moya Brennan's 2005 live album Óró - A Live Session and on 2008's Heart Strings.

== Track listing ==
1. "Cé Leis" – 4:05
2. "Against the Wind" – 5:34
3. "Oró" – 3:59
4. "Voices of the Land" – 3:23
5. "Jealous Heart" – 4:37
6. "Land of Youth (Tir na nÓg)" – 5:53
7. "I Believe (Deep Within)" – 3:57
8. "Beating Heart" – 4:16
9. "No Easy Way" – 5:24
10. "Atlantic Shore" – 4:02

== Personnel ==
=== Band ===
- Máire Brennan – Vocals, Harp, Piano, Keyboards
- Deirdre Brennan – Vocals
- Brídín Brennan – Vocals
- Calum Malcolm – Keyboards
- Dónal Lunny – Bodhrán, Bouzouki, electric Bouzouki, Mandolin, Keyboards
- Nigel Thomas – Drums, Percussion
- Nigel Clarke – Acoustic Guitar
- Alex Poots – Flugel Horn
- Richie Buckley – Soprano Saxophone
- Mick Taylor – Tin Whistle, Chinese Flute

== Commercial singles ==
1. "Against the Wind"
2. "Jealous Heart"

== Promotional singles ==
1. "Beating Heart"
