= Eyes of Innocence (Brídín Brennan album) =

Album by Brídín Brennan

Studio album by Brídín Brennan
- Released: 12 August 2005
- Genre: Pop · synth-pop · downtempo
- Length: 45:36
- Label: MDM Records
- Producer: Chris O'Brien · Oisin Murray · Scott Maher

Eyes of Innocence is the debut studio album by Irish singer-songwriter Brídín Brennan. It was released on 12 August 2005 by MDM Records. It consists of a wide selection of original songs, written by Brennan, while the single, "You Can't Hurt Me" has a sample of Glen Campbell's "By the Time I Get to Phoenix".

The Belfast Telegraph wrote that it was "an upbeat pop album, with a polished sound and an easy-listening vibe. Perhaps the only thing reminiscent of Clannad is Bridin's voice, which is beautifully soft and restrained - and yes, there are a few layered, echoey backing vocals to show it off to full effect."

Jackie Hayden wrote in HotPress, "Brennan has a faultless voice, but she’s poorly served on her debut by songs that sound like they came off a production line in LA., and in the end Eyes of Innocence fails to live up to the high standards of originality already achieved by the family business."

Justin Elswick in MusicalDiscoveries described the album as being "more modern and beat-heavy than her sisters' work, the tracks on Eyes of Innocence provide a heavenly, chilled-out listening experience.

== Track listing ==
1. "Face to Face" — 4:05
2. "You Can't Hurt Me" — 3:41
3. "Hang On" — 3:41
4. "Where's Your Love" — 3:48
5. "Got What You Wanted" — 4:10
6. "Deep Deep Sleep" — 4:28
7. "It's Too Late" — 4:37
8. "Breakdown" — 4:23
9. "Power of Three" — 3:54
10. "Another Day" — 4:06
11. "Don't Go" — 4:43
