= Brídín Brennan =

Irish pop singer from County Donegal

- Born: Brídín Ní Bhraonáin; 10 July 1968 (age 57); Dore, Gweedore, Co. Donegal, Ireland
- Genres: Pop
- Occupations: Singer; songwriter; secretary; choir director
- Years active: 1990–present
- Label: Warner Music
- Spouse: Cameron Campbell (m. 2001)
- Website: web.archive.org/web/20141029041347/http://www.bridinbrennan.com/

Brídín Ní Bhraonáin, professionally known as Brídín Brennan, is an Irish pop singer from Gweedore, County Donegal. She is the youngest of nine siblings, notably the sister of Enya, Moya Brennan, Ciarán Brennan, and Pól Brennan, and has also toured with family band Clannad.

== Career ==
Brídín's musical career began in the 1990s, when her sister Moya asked her to join as a vocalist at Clannad's live performances, and with the Duggans (also members of Clannad). Brídín featured on "Noinín/The Mucky Duck". Over the next few years she accompanied Clannad on tours in Ireland and abroad, and took part in recording on some of their albums and appeared as a backing singer for Moya Brennan on the television shows Later... with Jools Holland in the UK and The Tonight Show with Jay Leno in the United States.

She went on to work along with her other sisters Olive and Deirdre on Moya Brennan's solo projects, including the first and second solo albums Máire and Misty Eyed Adventures. Brídín went on to record her sole album Eyes of Innocence in 2005. The album was released exclusively in Ireland.

Prior to her music career, Brídín started work as a hairdresser, "for two to two-and-a-half years in Donegal when I left school." She also worked as a senior receptionist at the Charles Worthington salon in London, and also as a food safety receptionist.

== Discography ==
Albums

- Eyes of Innocence (2005)

Singles

- "Hang On" (2001)
- "You Can't Hurt Me" (2005)

== Personal life ==
In 2001, Brídín married Australian-born Cameron Campbell. They have two young daughters. Enya is godmother to one of Brídín's daughters.
