= Honey Promises =

Studio album by Sinéad Madden
- Released: 5 May 2009
- Recorded: 2009
- Genres: Pop; Irish Traditional
- Producers: Fionán de Barra; Sinéad Madden

Honey Promises is the debut studio album by Irish musician Sinéad Madden. The album was launched on 5 May 2009 at The Academy in Abbey Street, Dublin.

Madden co-wrote the album with Fionan De Barra.

== Track listing ==
1. "Someone Else"
2. "Fade To Black"
3. "Shadows"
4. "Impossible Dream"
5. "Honey Promises"
6. "Take me"
7. "Goodbye"
8. "Temptress"
9. "Personal Prison"
10. "Butterfly Girl"
11. "Will You?"
12. "Broken Star"
