= Chris O'Brien =

Chris O'Brien may refer to:

- Chris O'Brien (American football) (1881–1951), owner of the Chicago Cardinals and co-founder of the National Football League
- Chris O'Brien (baseball) (born 1989), minor league baseball player
- Chris O'Brien (rugby) (born 1950), Welsh rugby league player
- Chris O'Brien (surgeon) (1952–2009), Australian oncologist and surgeon
- Chris O'Brien (rugby union) (born 1964), United States rugby union player

== See also ==
- Christopher O'Brien (disambiguation)
