= Xenogears =

1998 video game

- North American box art
- Developer: Square Product Development Division 3
- Publishers: JP: Square; NA: Square Electronic Arts
- Director: Tetsuya Takahashi
- Producer: Hiromichi Tanaka
- Programmer: Kiyoshi Yoshii
- Artists: Kunihiko Tanaka; Yasuyuki Honne
- Writers: Tetsuya Takahashi; Kaori Tanaka; Masato Kato
- Composer: Yasunori Mitsuda
- Platform: PlayStation
- Release: JP: February 11, 1998; NA: October 20, 1998
- Genre: Role-playing
- Modes: Single-player, multiplayer

Xenogears (Note: Xenogears (Japanese: ゼノギアス, Hepburn: Zenogiasu)) is a 1998 role-playing video game developed and published by Square for the PlayStation. It is the debut entry in the larger Xeno franchise. The gameplay of Xenogears revolves around navigating 3D environments both on-foot and using humanoid mecha dubbed "Gears". Combat is governed by a version of the "Active Time Battle" system. The story follows protagonist Fei Fong Wong and several others as they journey across the world to overthrow the all-powerful rule of Solaris and uncover mysteries concerning their world. The story incorporates Jungian psychology, Freudian thought, and religious symbolism.

Created by Tetsuya Takahashi and his wife Kaori Tanaka as a proposal for Final Fantasy VII, it was allowed to be developed as its own project; first as a sequel to Chrono Trigger and then as an original game with a science fiction premise. The characters were designed by Kunihiko Tanaka, while the gears were designed by Junya Ishigaki and Yoshinori Ogura. The designs were portrayed during in-game cinematics through the use of anime cutscenes. Due to time constraints and the team's general inexperience, the second half of the game's plot was primarily told through cutscenes.

The game was almost not localized due to its religious content; its localization was handled by SquareSoft staff and translator Richard Honeywood, who described it as one of the most troublesome games of his career. Xenogears received critical acclaim, with many calling it a work of art due to its heavy religious themes and elements of Jungian psychology. Praises particularly went towards the storyline, gameplay, characters, and psychological and religious themes, but received criticism for the rushed pace of the second disc, due to a lack of gameplay and excessive narration.

== Gameplay ==
Xenogears combines traditional role-playing video game structures such as Square's signature Active Time Battle system with new features particular to the game's martial arts combat style. It features two slightly different battle systems: in the first, the player controls human characters in combat manipulated through the sequencing of learned combos. The second, making use of "gears", introduces different sets of statistics and abilities for each character. Xenogears features both traditional anime and pre-rendered CGI movie clips by Production I.G to illustrate important plot points. The player advances the protagonist and his companions through a three-dimensional fictional world.

=== Battle system ===
Typical battles use the Active Time Battle (ATB) system. Once a character's ATB gauge fills, the player can input a battle command for that character.

Battle in Xenogears is a variant of the Active Time Battle system found in games such as Chrono Trigger and the Final Fantasy series. Most enemy encounters in Xenogears are random. When a battle begins, there is a transition to a separate screen with a combat interface. Player-characters use a combination of martial arts moves, "Ether" (magical) attacks, and special "Deathblow" combinations, which are learned through the repetition of specific proportions of strong, moderate, and weak hits. All offensive actions use Action Points (AP), costing either three points, two points, or one point, corresponding to the intensity of the attack.

Characters can use a variety of magical abilities for both offense and ally-support. These abilities are limited by the number of available Ether Points (EP), which must be replenished using items during exploration (non-combat) sequences. For most characters, these abilities are attributed to "Ether", a mysterious power to which (presumably) all humans have access. Some characters' magical abilities are referred to by different names, implying differences in their origins. For example, Fei's magic is called "Chi" and Citan's is called "Arcane". While fighting in gears, human Ether abilities are amplified, though some change or become unavailable during this type of combat.

In addition to hand-to-hand combat, the characters sometimes fight from within giant robots called gears. In gear combat, the limiting factor of AP is replaced by fuel, with each attack consuming an amount corresponding to its power. For these battles, "deathblows" may only be executed after first building up the "Attack Level"—represented by a number in the bottom-left of the gear combat interface—through the execution of strong, moderate, or weak attacks. One deathblow is allowed per point on the Attack Level gauge. There are three levels for normal gear deathblows and, beyond the third level, an "infinite" level with its own set of deathblows. To reach "Infinity Mode", a character must stay at attack level 3 while performing any other action. With each turn, there is a chance that Infinity Mode will be reached. Having a duration of three turns, Infinity Mode allows fuel to be recharged in much larger quantities and, while in this mode, gears have access to "Infinity" attacks. Gears can regain fuel with a "Charge" command. The gears can activate "Boosters" which enable them to act faster at a cost of extra fuel per turn.

== Plot ==
=== Setting ===
Xenogears initially takes place on Ignas, the largest continent of the Xenogears world and the site of a centuries-long war between the nations of Aveh and Kislev. A church-like organization known as the Ethos has excavated gears, giant robot suits, for the preservation of the world's culture. Although Kislev originally had the upper hand in the war, a mysterious army known as Gebler appeared and began to assist Aveh. With Gebler's help, the Aveh military recovered its losses and began making its way into Kislev's territory. As the story unfolds, the setting broadens to encompass the entire world and the two floating countries, Shevat and Solaris. Solaris, ruled by Emperor Cain and an AI collective known as the Gazel Ministry, commands the Gebler army and the Ethos and secretly uses both to dominate the land-dwellers. Shevat has been the only country to evade the control of Solaris.

Much of the Xenogears plot and backstory is detailed in the Japanese-only book Xenogears Perfect Works. Produced by DigiCube, it details the history of the Xenogears universe from the discovery of the Zohar to the start of the game. According to the Perfect Works schematic (as well as the game's end credits), Xenogears is the fifth episode in a series of six, with events spanning multiple millennia.

=== Characters ===
Xenogears' nine playable characters come from different areas of the game's world. The game begins on Ignas, a continent with two countries, Aveh and Kislev. Fei and Citan at first appear to be from this land, although it is later learned that they originate from the capital cities Aphel Aura and Etrenank of the floating countries of Shevat and Solaris, respectively. Fei is the story's protagonist, and has initially lost his memories of his past. Elly, a beautiful Gebler officer of Solaris, is destined to be near Fei and falls in love with him by the end of the game. Citan is a man whose knowledge of the world and technology often aids in the party's quest. Bart, a desert pirate, is also from Ignas and is the rightful heir to the throne of Aveh. Rico, a demi-human with incredible strength, lives in a Kislev prison, spending his days as a gear-battling champion. Solaris, a hidden city of advanced technology, is home to several characters in the game. Billy, a pious worker for the Ethos religious group, was originally from Solaris. Maria and Chu-Chu are both from Shevat, the floating city and the only place resisting Solaris' domination. Emeralda is a humanoid being constructed by an ancient civilization from a colony of nanomachines, and was retrieved from the ruins of the ancient civilization Zeboim. Significant non-playable characters include Krelian and Miang, both leaders of Solaris who seek to revive Deus, a mechanical weapon that fell to earth thousands of years ago. They serve as the game's main antagonists. Grahf, a mysterious man with immense power, serves as a major antagonist; he follows Fei and his group and often fights them, though his goals remain a mystery until very late in the game. As being the Contact and the Anti-type, Fei and Elly have been reincarnated several times, while the Complement, Miang, has awoken in hundreds of women down throughout the game's history.

=== Story ===
Xenogears centers around the protagonist Fei Fong Wong, an adopted young male in the village of Lahan, brought by a mysterious "masked man" three years ago. The events surrounding Fei's arrival at the village cause him to have retrograde amnesia. During an attack on Lahan from the Gebler army, Fei pilots an empty Gear and fights the enemy, accidentally destroying the village. As a result, Fei and Citan, the village's doctor, leave with the abandoned Gear to get it away from the village. Fei meets Elly, a Gebler officer, and then Grahf, who claims to know about Fei's past and admits to spearheading the attack on Lahan to unlock Fei's abilities. Eventually, Fei and Citan are picked up by Bart, a desert pirate and heir to the throne of Aveh. Fei again loses control of himself inside his Gear while Bart and Citan are attacked by an unknown red Gear. Fei wakes up in a Kislev prison and meets Wiseman, a mysterious masked man, who originally brought Fei to Lahan. Fei is able to escape with the help of his friends, including a new one, prisoner Rico, but he and Elly are separated from the rest of the party and accidentally shot down by Bart.

They are rescued by the Thames, a mobile floating city. After learning Elly's whereabouts, Gebler attacks Thames to kidnap Elly and Miang, a Gebler officer, unsuccessfully attempts to brainwash her. Gebler leader Ramsus, who holds a vendetta against Fei, attacks Thames, searching for him. Afterward, Billy, an Ethos worker onboard Thames, allows Fei to use the Ethos' advanced medical technology. Bishop Stone, Ethos' leader, reveals to the party Ethos's true purpose of controlling the land dwellers, or "Lambs", for Solaris. The group follows Stone to Zeboim, an excavation site. They discover a young girl composed of nanomachines, which is what Solarian leader Krelian seeks. Stone takes the girl while the group fights Id, the mysterious red Gear's pilot, who wants the girl, but is stopped by Wiseman. The group returns and finds Fei awake and standing at his Gear with a case of anterograde amnesia. Fei and his friends decide to ally themselves with the floating city of Shevat, the only remaining city capable of resisting Solaris, joined by Shevat locals Maria and Chu-Chu. During this time, Bart regains his throne and initiates peace between the two countries and Stone is destroyed. Upon entering Solaris, they encounter Emeralda, the nanomachine colony. She attacks at first, but recognizes Fei, referring to him as "Kim", much to Fei's confusion. In Solaris, Fei learns that Citan has been working for Emperor Cain and that Solaris has been producing food and medicine out of mutated humans in the Soylent System facility. The party also learns that the Gazel Ministry seeks to revive their God and achieve eternal life, while Krelian seeks to possess Elly. They escape from Solaris before Id destroys it as Citan was really a double agent on their side because Cain was actually against the Ministry. Back at Shevat, Citan informs his friends that Id is actually Fei's split personality, with Fei's Gear turning red when he switches to Id due to their connection.

After Krelian manipulates Ramsus into assassinating the Emperor, the Gazel Ministry uses the Gaetia Key, an artifact that manipulates the DNA of massive numbers of humans around the world, turning them into mutants called Wels to collect flesh to reconstruct their God, an all-powerful war machine called Deus that crash-landed on the planet ten thousand years ago. During this time, Elly and Fei become romantically involved with each other and learn that they are the reincarnations of Sophia and Lacan. Lacan was a painter while Sophia was the Holy Mother of Nisan around the time of the war between Shevat and Solaris five hundred years earlier. Lacan blamed himself for Sophia's death during the war and, with the help of Miang, became Grahf and sought to destroy the world. Although defeated, he and Miang have transmigrated their minds into other humans since. Krelian disposes the Gazel Ministry because they are no longer necessary and kidnaps Elly, the Mother, with Miang who must be sacrificed in order to revive Deus. Miang is killed by an enraged Ramsus as he realizes he has been used, and Elly turns into Miang. Before becoming absorbed by Deus with Krelian, Miang revealed that Deus is actually the core of an interplanetary invasion system created by a federation of spacefaring humans, one that was deemed far too dangerous for use and was therefore dismantled. Fei, as Id, attempts to make contact with the Zohar. Wiseman, who reveals himself to be Fei's father, stops him, giving peace to Fei's other personalities. At this time, Fei makes contact with the Wave Existence—an extra-dimensional being who is trapped inside Deus and is the source of power for all Gears—and learns that he must destroy Deus to free humanity. Fei's Gear transforms into the Xenogears and Grahf appears, revealing that he had been inside Fei's father's body. Grahf tries to merge with Fei but is defeated and sacrifices himself.

Fei had discovered that he is a descendant of Abel, a young boy who was a passenger on board the Eldridge, a spaceship that was being used to transport Deus, who had become self-aware and took over the Eldridge. Amidst the confusion, Abel was separated from his mother and accidentally made contact with the Wave Existence through the Zohar, Deus' power source. It gave him the power to one day destroy Deus and the Zohar in order to free itself. The Wave Existence also sensed Abel's longing for his mother and used the biological computer Kadomony to create a woman for a companion. When Deus gained full control over the Eldridge, the captain decided to initiate the self-destruct sequence in an attempt to destroy it. Both Deus and the Zohar survived the explosion and landed on a nearby planet along with Abel, under the protection of the Wave Existence. He was the sole survivor, but was soon united with the woman that the Wave Existence had created for him as a companion, Elly. Abel and Elly, at first, led a happy life, but Deus had also created Miang, Cain, and the Gazel Ministry to begin a human civilization on the planet, one which would be under their control to one day be turned into Wels and be absorbed into Deus to recover its strength. When the now-adult Abel and Elly discovered this, they openly challenged Cain and the Gazel Ministry, but lost and were both killed. However, through the power of the Wave Existence, they are able to be reincarnated in later eras to combat Deus. One of these incarnations lived during an ancient technologically advanced era in Zeboim, where Abel's incarnation went by the name Kim and created Emeralda. Ramsus, revealed to be a biologically engineered clone of Emperor Cain, who had a change of heart over time after killing Abel, created by Krelian and Miang as a means of controlling Deus who was rejected in favor of Fei, hence his hatred of the latter, attacks one more time and is finally defeated. He is later rescued during an attack and convinced to let go of his anger and aid the group.

Fei sets out to destroy Deus and free the Wave Existence and Elly. In Merkaba, the party defeats Deus, but they realize that the energy released from the Wave Existence's shift will destroy the planet. Elly, inside Deus, tries to move it away from the planet and Fei, in his Xenogears, follows to save her, but both disappear in the rift. Krelian confronts them, telling Fei he only sought to end the pain and suffering that comes with human existence by reverting everything back to when it all began, when all was one, to ascend to the realm of God. Fei rejects Krelian's ideology with his love for Elly, but Krelian challenges Fei, telling him to prove this love that could make him independent of God, and calls forth Urobolus, a gigantic serpentine incarnation of Miang. Xenogears appears and Fei uses it to defeat Urobolus, destroying Miang for good. Krelian releases Elly and reveals to Fei that he had planned to become one with God along with Elly. During her time with Krelian, Elly had seen inside his heart and realized it was full of sadness and despair for all the atrocities he had committed. Despite everything, Elly says that Krelian truly loved people more than anyone else. Because no one will forgive his sins, he declines Fei's offer to return and ascends to a higher plane of existence along with the Wave Existence, telling Fei and Elly that he envies them. Fei and Elly then return to their planet along with Xenogears and reunite with the rest of the party.

== Development ==
Xenogears was produced by Hiromichi Tanaka, who previously worked on the SNES game Secret of Mana. The scenario of the game was written by director Tetsuya Takahashi and by Kaori Tanaka. Yasuyuki Honne served as art director, while Kunihiko Tanaka was responsible for the character designs. Tetsuo Mizuno, Tomoyuki Takechi, and Final Fantasy creator Hironobu Sakaguchi were executive producers for Xenogears. Koichi Mashimo, an animation director and his studio Bee Train, was in charge of the anime cut scenes. The CGI sequences were created by Shirogumi. Xenogears started out as an early concept conceived by Takahashi and Tanaka for the Square game Final Fantasy VII. Their superior in the company deemed it "too dark and complicated for a fantasy", but Takahashi was allowed to develop it as a separate project. The project began under the working title "Project Noah". The main impetus for Takahashi was that he was growing frustrated with the Final Fantasy series. The initial concept was to make Xenogears a sequel to Chrono Trigger, but after multiple clashes with the company over this and unspecified practical difficulties, it was decided to make it a completely original title. Due to this initial development idea, there were concepts unsuited for a fantasy world, so a compromise was made by incorporating both fantasy and science fiction into the game's world.

Development took approximately two years, and included a staff of thirty developers. Preliminary planning and creation of the backstory extended to several years before that. The word "Xeno" had been decided between staff from an early stage, with its meaning being "something strange or alien". "Gears" was chosen from multiple suggested words. The game's Gears were not present during early stages, with their places being filled by traditional summoned monsters. The game's use of anime cutscenes was chosen as it was difficult to properly recreate Tanaka's Gear artwork into 3D CGI. The game's engine was also designed to be best suited for the 3D map displays and battle arenas. Takahashi had wanted to create the game in full 3D, but the PlayStation's capacities meant this could not be managed, resulting in the current mesh of 2D sprites against 3D backgrounds. The themes and story were greatly influenced by the works and philosophies of Friedrich Nietzsche, Sigmund Freud and Carl Jung, as well as dystopian science fiction films such as THX 1138 and Soylent Green. According to Tanaka, the reason for this correlation was simply due to a common interest with her husband. According to her, the story revolved around "where do we come from, what are we, where are we going". There was a large portion of story and artwork that did not make it into the final game. The game's second disc consisted mainly of narration by Fei and Elly of events following the party's escape from Solaris. While it was popularly assumed to be due to budget constraints, Takahashi later revealed the full reason; as his team was inexperienced they were unable to create the entire proposed game in the expected two-year development time, so instead of ending prematurely with the end of the first disc, Takahashi offered up a compromise which became the second disc's content, allowing the staff to finish the game within time and budget deadlines.

Square had announced that Xenogears may not have come out in the United States due to "sensitive religious issues". The English translation of Xenogears was the first instance in which an English localization team worked directly with Square developers. It was the first major project of Square translator Richard Honeywood. According to Honeywood, translating the game was a particularly difficult task due to it containing numerous scientific concepts and philosophies. He came into contact with it because its previously assigned translators quit or asked for reassignment due to its challenge. In a later interview, Honeywood stated that the biggest issue was with the multiple religious references, and the concept at the end of "killing God", which needed to be adjusted so that it remained faithful to the original premise while stepping around some content that might offend. Honeywood may also have had a hand in the Japanese naming of Deus: the staff were originally going to call it Yahweh, and during his argument against it he said "It's dangerous" (ヤベーよ, yabē yo). The Japanese staff found the similarity between Yahweh and yabē amusing, and, according to Honeywood, decided to call the boss Yabeh in Japanese.

Square Enix released Xenogears on the Japanese PlayStation Network on June 25, 2008, and in North America on February 22, 2011.

=== Music ===
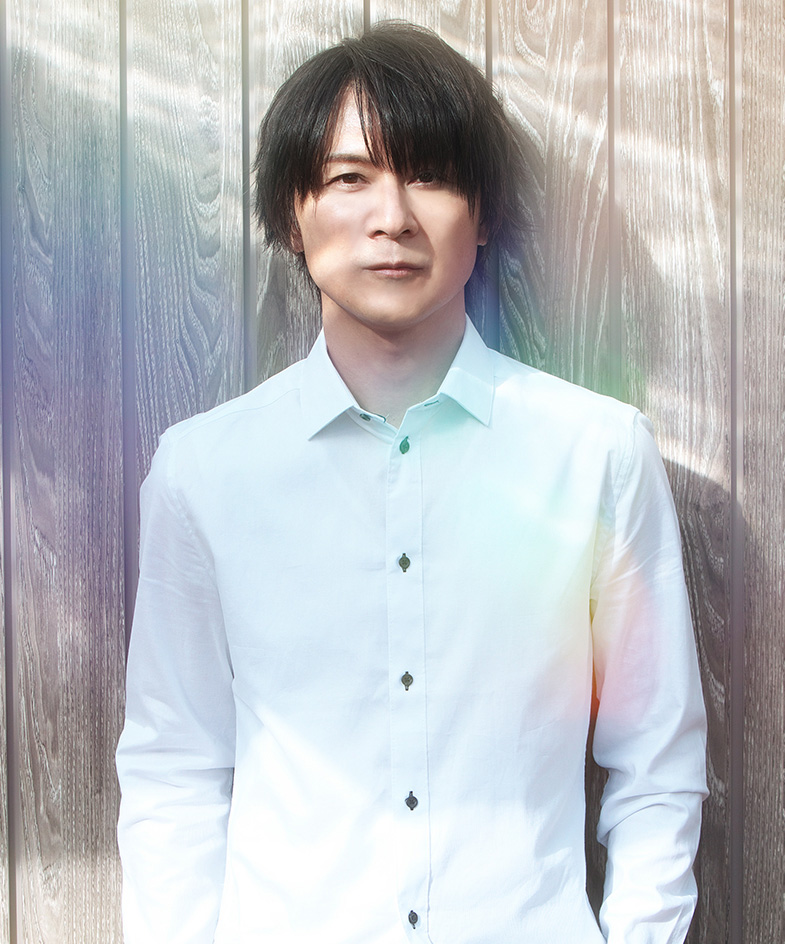
Yasunori Mitsuda composed and produced the game's original score.

The music in Xenogears was composed and produced by Yasunori Mitsuda. The Xenogears Original Soundtrack was released on two discs and published by DigiCube in Japan in 1998. The score contains 41 instrumental tracks, in addition to a choral track and two songs. According to Mitsuda, the music of Xenogears belongs to the traditional music genre. Though he first described it as stemming from "a world of [his] own imagining" rather than any specific country, he has also claimed a strong Irish or Celtic music influence. There are two vocal tracks included on the OST, and both are sung by Joanne Hogg. One of the tracks, "Stars of Tears", did not appear in the final version of the game. It was originally intended to play in a cut scene at the start of the game along with the main staff credits. The scene, however, was removed for pacing issues, as it would have made the combined opening movie and introduction scenes last roughly ten minutes. The other, "Small Two of Pieces ~Screeching Shards~", was the first ending theme with lyrics to ever appear in a game developed by Square.

An arranged soundtrack of Xenogears composed and arranged by Mitsuda was released as Creid. For Creid, he expanded on the theme from the original album of having Celtic influences in "easy-to-listen-to" pop tracks to create an album of arranged Xenogears music with a more prominent Celtic style. The album contains a mixture of vocal and instrumental tracks, and combines Japanese and Celtic music together in its pieces. The album features five vocal tracks and five instrumental tracks. The main lyricist, Junko Kudo, wrote the lyrics to four of the five vocal tracks, while Mitsuda wrote the lyrics to the title track, which were then translated from Japanese to Gaelic for the recording. Celtic singer Joanne Hogg did not reprise her role in Creid. Instead, Tetsuko Honma sang the four tracks written by Kudo, while Eimear Quinn sang "Creid". Myth: The Xenogears Orchestral Album, an album of music from the game arranged orchestrally by Mitsuda's own music company Procyon Studio, was released on CD and vinyl in February 2011.

A Blu-ray album entitled Xenogears Original Soundtrack Revival Disc - the first and the last - was released in Japan on April 4, 2018. The album is a remaster of the original soundtrack, plus outtakes and other content. A 20th anniversary concert was held in Tokyo, Japan on April 7 and 8, 2018.

=== Merchandise ===
There have been several Japanese books and comics published concerning the Xenogears franchise. Xenogears God Slaying Story, a series by Masatoshi Kusakabe, was published by Shueisha in 1998. DigiCube published both Xenogears Perfect Works and a memorial album named Thousands of Daggers, which contains the entire script to the game in Japanese, along with screenshots. Two manga books, Xenogears Comic Anthology and Xenogears 4koma Comic, were released by Movic. Movic released wallscrolls, notebooks, pins, keychains, stickers, and postcards depicting the Xenogears cast.

== Reception ==
Reception

Aggregate scores
Aggregator	Score
GameRankings	91% (21 reviews)
Metacritic	84/100 (15 reviews)

Review scores
Publication	Score
AllGame	4/5
Edge	8/10
Electronic Gaming Monthly	35.5/40
Famitsu	31/40
Game Informer	9/10
GameRevolution	B+
GameSpot	9/10
IGN	9.5/10
Next Generation	5/5
PlayStation: The Official Magazine	5/5
RPGFan	98% (PS1); 96% (PSN)
Games Domain	10/10
HonestGamers	10/10
Just RPG	A
New York Daily News	4/4
Video Gamers First	10/10

Awards
Publication	Award
Game Informer	Best Role-Playing Game of the Year
Electronic Gaming Monthly (Readers' Choice)	RPG of the Year
Electronic Gaming Monthly (Editors' Choice)	RPG of the Year (Runner-Up)
Official U.S. PlayStation Magazine	Best RPG, Best Story
RPGFan	Best Import (#3)

Xenogears was a commercial success in both Japan and North America. It received a "Gold Prize" from Sony in May 1998, indicating sales above 500,000 units in Japan; the game proceeded to sell over 890,000 copies domestically by the end of the year. As of March 31, 2003, the game had shipped 1.19 million copies worldwide, with 910,000 of those copies being shipped in Japan and 280,000 abroad. As a result of these sales, it was re-released as a Greatest Hits title in December 2003. In Japanese gaming magazine Famitsu, Xenogears was voted the 16th best video game of all time by its readers in a poll held in 2006. On a similar poll at GameFAQs, users of the website voted Xenogears the 32nd "Best Game Ever" in 2005. It was placed in the same position in IGN's "Top 100 Games - Readers Choice" feature in 2006, and as number 28 in 2008.

=== Critical response ===
Xenogears was met with critical acclaim. Electronic Gaming Monthly praised the story, characters, gameplay, graphics, and soundtrack. IGN described it as the "hands-down best RPG" of the year, praising the storyline, gameplay, graphics, presentation, and soundtrack. GameSpot described it as one of SquareSoft's best role-playing games, praising the story, gameplay, and audio, but criticized the lack of graphical polish. Allgame pointed out in a positive light that the character battles are "unlike most role-playing games from this company".

The game's story and characters were well received. Electronic Gaming Monthly said it is "rich in story and character development." Game Informer and Next Generation agreed that the plot was one of the game's highlights, the former drawing comparisons to Star Wars, Star Blazers, the Old Testament, and many other Square games, making it "a game every RPG fanatic must play." IGN said the storyline is intricate, engrossing, "deep, complex, and once in a while even confusing, until more of the real underlying plotline is uncovered." GameSpot said the story is "excellent" and "thought-provoking" but said it can be "a little preachy at times", but went on to say that the religious and existential themes "enhance the story and [our] understanding of the game's deep characterizations". Game Revolution described the storyline as "epic" and "fabulous" with "many twists and turns" and a large cast of characters. RPGFan said "the story is unique and probably the most complex and interesting of any RPG", giving it a 99% rating for the story. Retrospectively, Edge praised the plot's scope and ambition and the protagonist as the "most complicated Freudian hero" in video games, but said it has a "flawed" script and "muddied" translation, as well as too many cut scenes, especially on the second disc, where the use of the world map is restricted for an extended period and the number of cut scenes increases. Years after the game's release, Jeremy Parish of Electronic Gaming Monthly called the game's plot "one of the wackiest game plotlines ever", but said that it "actually makes sense" if the player ignores all of the sideplots. IGN, however, stated that despite having too many cut scenes and a sometimes confusing plot, "immersion is a key factor in Xenogears and the questions you may have about the storyline are all answered at some point in the game." Following the PSN release, RPGFan's James Quentin Clark said Xenogears has "hands down the best single story I have seen in any video game," giving it a 100% rating for the story.

Reviewers largely praised Xenogears' gameplay. Next Generation praised Square's Active Time Battle gauge and said that inclusion of the AP meter and combo attacks "is not only refreshing in a turn-based RPG, but gives players a higher level of interaction during battle." IGN claimed that "the most impressive feature in combat is the ability to use massive "Gears" or mechs", noting that Square's attention to programming these battles is made evident by how "visually satisfying" they are. IGN praised the game's exploration, saying that the ability to jump and climb "adds even more depth to exploration of different environments and distances Xenogears from being too straightforward of a traditional RPG", the only complaint being that the rotating camera is sometimes "clumsy".

The soundtrack was well received. Electronic Gaming Monthly said the game sounds as "beautiful" as it looks. GameSpot said it "expertly uses audio to push the story along" and noted that many of the games' tracks "include voice or chanting and all are appropriately uppity or low with the game's mood", but said there were many areas with silence or ambience making the "game's soundtrack a tad sparse." Xenogears was the first Square game to feature voice overs and anime cut scenes. Electronic Gaming Monthly said they are "some of the slickest animation cinemas" they have seen. Game Revolution praised the "absolutely spectacular and stunning" hand-drawn anime cut-scenes, but stated that they were sparse and poorly synched with the voice acting.

Retrospectively, Edge commented that although it is "considered by some to be a multimillion-yen, convoluted science-fiction vanity project, Xenogears nevertheless remains one of the most keenly eulogized PlayStation RPGs." The magazine also noted that it was Takahashi's "most challenging and pure work" and that the Xenosaga series never quite matched up to Xenogears.

=== Legacy ===
Shortly after Xenogears was released, there was speculation of a sequel being released, although this never occurred. In 1999, Tanaka said that a project related to Xenogears was being developed. He also revealed that a sequel to Xenogears was initially planned, but never came to be. In June 2000, Sugiura Hirohide, president of Monolith Soft, said that a sequel was being considered before being cancelled due to the company's film investments at the time with Final Fantasy: The Spirits Within.

While Xenogears has never had an official sequel or prequel, there was speculation that Namco and Monolith Soft's Xenosaga was a prequel when it was first announced. Tetsuya Takahashi was the director and writer for both Xenogears and Xenosaga and noted that "with our relation between Square, I think it is difficult for us to say it is a direct sequel or prequel". Approximately twenty members of the Xenosaga development staff had previously worked on Xenogears.

On the connection between Xenogears and Xenosaga, Takahashi has stated:

It's probably more suitable to say that it follows the direction and style of Xenogears. [...] Now that we are under a different company, we figured we should start everything from scratch all over again. Though there are familiar faces that serve as important characters in Xenosaga, others are more like self-parodies, so we don't really want Xenogears fans to overreact. Like movies, sometimes you have the director of the movie or friend of the leading actor appearing as cameos, so it's similar to that.

Xenogears has occasionally been featured in other Square Enix properties. On 21 October 2016, it was revealed that Xenogears would be featured in World of Final Fantasy as a mirage. In 2017, gears from the game, along with avatars of Fei and Bart, were included as pre-order cosmetic bonuses in Square Enix's mecha shooting game, Figureheads. On 11 February 2018, in celebration of Xenogears' 20th anniversary, Kunihiko Tanaka and Junya Ishigaki collaborated with Square Enix to release Xenogears Bring Arts figures of Fei, Elly and Welltall. The cast of Xenogears were also featured in Final Fantasy Brave Exvius for a limited time as part of a collaboration event.

Despite the game's popularity, it has never been released in Europe. In 2011, Ross McGrath, the PlayStation Store Content Manager at the time (responding to a query about the possibility of Xenogears on the European PlayStation Network Store), explained that the lack of a PAL disc release created "a series of problems" that needed to be addressed, and that they didn't know if such problems could be resolved.
