= Creid =

Arranged album from the video game Xenogears

Soundtrack album by Yasunori Mitsuda & Millennial Fair
- Released: April 22, 1998; June 29, 2005
- Studios: Green Bird Studio, Tokyo; Westland Studio, Dublin
- Genres: Video game music Celtic music
- Length: 49:01
- Labels: DigiCube; Square Enix (re-release)
- Producer: Yasunori Mitsuda

Yasunori Mitsuda & Millennial Fair chronology
Xenogears Original Soundtrack (1998)	Creid (1998)	Street Fighter EX2 Arrange Album (1998)

Creid (Irish pronunciation: [cɾʲɛdʲ]; meaning "Believe") is the arranged soundtrack to Square's role-playing video game Xenogears. It was written by the game's composer Yasunori Mitsuda and performed by a musical ensemble dubbed Millennial Fair. It was released on April 22, 1998, in Japan by DigiCube, and re-released by Square Enix on June 29, 2005. Comprising ten tracks arranged from the Xenogears Original Soundtrack, the album is mostly done in Irish or Celtic music style, with minor influences of Japanese rock according to Mitsuda. Artists from Japan and Ireland were recruited for the project. Four of the five vocal tracks on the album were written by Junko Kudo and sung by Tetsuko Honma, while the title track "Creid" was written by Mitsuda and performed by Eimear Quinn.

The album was well received by critics, who praised both the originality of the concept as well as the execution and track selection. The work on the album inspired Mitsuda to bring Tomohiko Kira, the album's guitarist, back to have him perform in Chrono Cross; this would eventually result in the latter game's ending song "Radical Dreamers ~ Jewel which Cannot be Stolen ~".

== Creation ==
Xenogears was Yasunori Mitsuda's first major solo work, as his previous soundtracks were collaborations with other composers with the exception of the score to Radical Dreamers: Nusumenai Hōseki, which never saw an album release. According to Mitsuda, the music of Xenogears belongs to the traditional music genre. Though he first described it as stemming from "a world of [his] own imagining" rather than any specific country, he has also claimed a strong Irish or Celtic music influence. His musical approach for the original soundtrack was to insert Celtic influences into "easy-to-listen-to" pop tracks rather than making either "dense" Celtic music or simple background music. For Creid, he expanded on this theme to create an album of arranged Xenogears music with a more prominent Celtic style. The album contains a mixture of vocal and instrumental tracks, and combines Japanese and Celtic music together in its pieces. The album's title refers to two ideas, with one being "a message to those who feel they have lost sight of their ambitions for the flood of information this era surrounds us with" and the other an affirmation to himself that Mitsuda had "rediscovered [his] own path". Mitsuda felt that with this album, he had "discovered the precise mode of musical expression [he] was seeking within" himself and "given form to the belief within [his] heart".

In addition to Japanese musicians, several Irish artists contributed to Creid, including uilleann piper Davy Spillane—formerly of Moving Hearts and Riverdance—and Máire Breatnach, who had previously played fiddle on another Square album, Final Fantasy IV Celtic Moon. Mitsuda also asked guitarist Tomohiko Kira and singer Yoko Ueno to appear to the album after an acquaintance introduced him to them. Hidenobu "KALTA" Ootsuki worked on the album as an arranger and felt his work was made easier by his familiarity with Mitsuda's music—Creid was his second arrangement project with Mitsuda, after Chrono Trigger Arranged Version: The Brink of Time, which he had worked on three years before. According to Ootsuki, Mitsuda and he were complementary in style, which resulted in an album leaving a lot of space and freedom for the listeners' imagination. He felt that, since Chrono Trigger, Mitsuda's musical style had changed to use less "strong" notes and include more sophistication; upon hearing the Xenogears tracks he "literally" "couldn't wait" to arrange them. Mitsuda has described their collaborative style as that he would first create the "basic backbone" of the song and form the idea of how he wanted the song "to turn out", then take the result to Ootsuki for them to arrange together. The result would then be changed in the process of recording, as "what sounds good on a synth module doesn't always sound good on live instruments", and occasionally the recording artists would "ad-lib" parts that would make it into the final product. Mitsuda generally also chose the specific percussion instruments to be used while recording, rather than beforehand; he feels that "as long as the final product turns out to be like what I want it to be, the process doesn't really matter too much". As working with the other artists gave him a sense of celebration, Mitsuda named the "imaginary band" of performers Millennial Fair and credited them as such in the album.

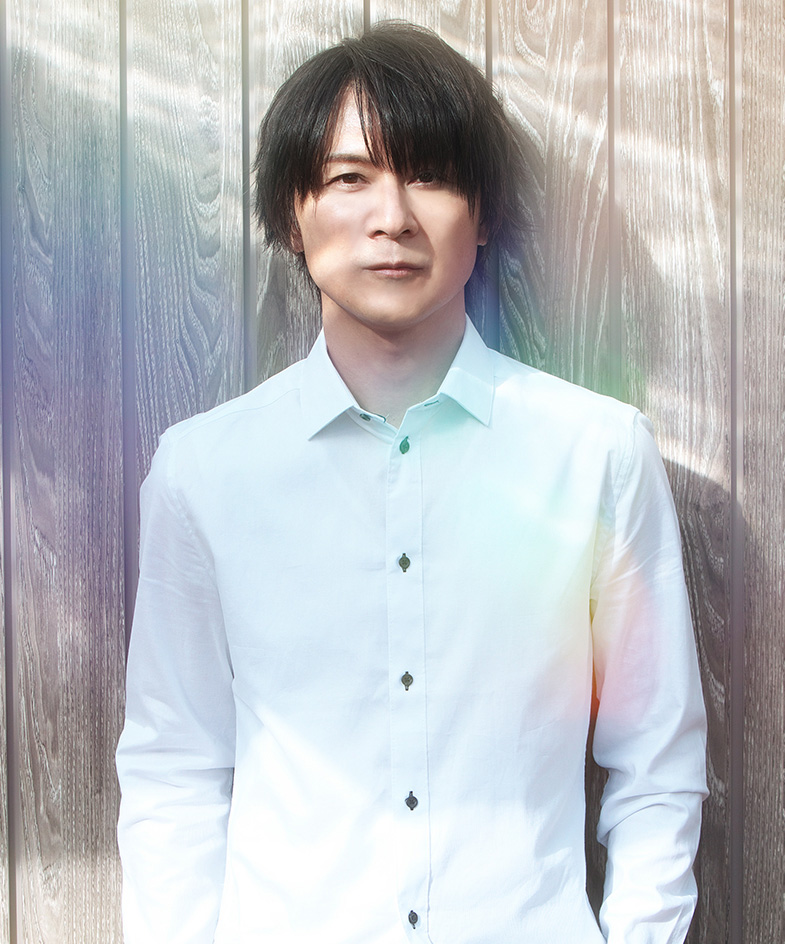
Yasunori Mitsuda composed and arranged the Xenogears soundtrack and Creid

Creid was released by DigiCube on April 22, 1998, and re-released by Square Enix on June 29, 2005. The release date was only seven weeks after that of the original soundtrack album and ten after the publication of the game itself. Its ten tracks cover a duration of 49:01. "Stars of Tears" and "Small Two of Pieces ~Screeching Shards~" from the original soundtrack appear on the album as "Two Wings" and "Möbius", respectively. "Stars of Tears", although included on the original album, did not appear in the game, as the scene it was to be played in, an opening cutscene to the game, was eliminated during development. The album features five vocal tracks and five instrumental tracks. Creid was the last album that Mitsuda worked on as an employee of Square; three months after its release, in July 1998, he resigned to work as a freelance artist and formed Procyon Studio to produce his work, though he continued to do work for Square such as the soundtrack to Chrono Cross the following year.

The main lyricist, Junko Kudo, wrote the lyrics to four of the five vocal tracks and had no previous experience with video game-related projects; she was surprised by the length of the game's script when she asked to look at it. She had never met Mitsuda before she was asked to write the lyrics. Mitsuda first heard her work in a song by Mimori Yusa on Yusa's 1988 album Hitomi Suishō, and describes himself as being very moved by the lyrics and becoming a big fan of Kudo's work. Although Mitsuda has said that he is generally not confident in his personal skills at writing lyrics, he wrote those of the title track, which were then translated from Japanese to Gaelic for the recording. Celtic singer Joanne Hogg of the band Iona, who was the singer from the original soundtrack, did not reprise her role in Creid. Instead, Tetsuko Honma sang the four tracks written by Kudo, while Eimear Quinn sang "Creid".

== Reception and legacy ==
Creid was well received by reviewers such as Patrick Gann of RPGFan, who claimed that every track on the album was "amazing" and held the work to be Yasunori Mitsuda's best. He especially applauded the "diverse multitude of instruments" and the fiddle playing of Máire Breatnach. Critics from Square Enix Music Online were also approving of the album, citing the album's "real emotion" and "extremely enchanting themes", with one reviewer naming it "one of the best arranged albums ever". Another reviewer felt that, though it was in his opinion one of Mitsuda's best works, some of the vocal performances such as "Two Wings" and "Spring Lullaby" held the album back.

RPGamer praised the album for its uniqueness and for "break[ing] away from the traditional 'arranged versions' of RPG soundtracks". They termed the songs "beautiful and moving" and especially praised the vocals as being an excellent mix of Japanese and Celtic influences. Elliot Guisinger of the site, however, in his review of the album cited the vocals as a weaker spot in what he called "the blueprint after which all future arrange albums should be modeled". Calling the album "a dream come true", he noted his disappointment that singer Joanne Hogg did not return from the original soundtrack. Eric Bowling of Soundtrack Central was also enthusiastic about the album, calling it "a turning point in arranged soundtracks" and "simply beyond words to describe". He noted "Lahan" as symbolizing the album as a whole, calling it a "coming together" of "diverse instruments and people" to create an energetic work of art.

Impressed with Tomohiko Kira's guitar playing, Mitsuda laid out plans after Creid to have him perform in Chrono Cross, resulting in the latter game's ending song "Radical Dreamers ~ Jewel which Cannot be Stolen ~". During their stay in Ireland, Mitsuda and the Creid album coordinator attended a live set of the folk band Lúnasa in a pub. As Mitsuda liked the concert, the coordinator encouraged the Irish band to do a Japanese live tour. No other Xenogears album has been produced by Square Enix after Creid, but an officially licensed tribute album titled Xenogears Light: An Arranged Album was published in limited quantities by the fan group OneUp Studios in 2005. The album features 20 tracks arranged from the Xenogears score and performed with acoustic instruments, such as piano, flute, guitar, and violin. An unofficial album of remixes titled Humans + Gears was produced as a digital album by OverClocked Remix on October 19, 2009, consisting of 33 tracks on two "discs". While Creid is the only album released by the ensemble dubbed "Millennial Fair", Mitsuda said in 2002 that he would like to try bringing back the formation, in some way, for another project. In February 2011, Square Enix released Myth: The Xenogears Orchestral Album, a second arranged album of music from the game, in an orchestral style.

== Track listing ==
All music is composed by Yasunori Mitsuda.

No.	Title	Lyrics	Length
1.	"Melkaba"	–	7:24
2.	"Two Wings" (Futatsu no Hane (二つの羽根))	Junko Kudo	2:57
3.	"Balto"	–	5:34
4.	"Creid"	Original words: Yasunori Mitsuda. Irish Translation: Blathnaid Coffey	4:40
5.	"Dajil"	–	4:11
6.	"Stairs of Light" (Hikari no Kaidan (光の階段))	Junko Kudo	3:44
7.	"October Mermaid" (Kannazuki no Ningyo (神無月の人魚))	–	4:07
8.	"Spring Lullaby" (Haru no Komoriuta (春の子守歌))	Junko Kudo	5:28
9.	"Lahan"	–	4:32
10.	"Möbius" (MEBIUSU (メビウス))	Junko Kudo	6:24

== Personnel ==
All information is taken from the soundtrack's liner notes.

- Yasunori Mitsuda – composer, producer, arranger, keyboards, programming
- Millennial Fair
  - Tetsuko "Techie" Honma – vocal on "Two Wings", "Stairs of Light", "Spring Lullaby", and "Möbius"
  - Eimear Quinn – vocal on "Creid"
  - Yoko Ueno – chorus
  - Kimiko Komatsu – chorus
  - Hitoshi Watanabe – bass
  - HATA (Hiroshi Hata) – electric guitar, acoustic guitar, electric sitar
  - Tomohiko Kira – bouzouki, electric guitar
  - Davy Spillane – uilleann pipes, low whistle
  - Laurie Kaszas – tin whistle
  - Kinya Sogawa – shakuhachi, shinobue
  - Haruo Kondo – bag pipes
  - Maria Kalaniemi – accordion
  - Anne-Marie O'Farrell – Celtic harp
  - Laoise Kelly – Celtic harp
  - Máire Breatnach – fiddle
  - Tamao Fujii – percussion
  - KALTA (Hidenobu Ootsuki) – co-arranger, drums, programming
