= Christopher O'Brien (admiral) =

Irish admiral

Christopher O'Brien was an Irish naval officer of the eighteenth century.

He was of Gaelic origin, descended from the O'Brien dynasty. He served in the Royal Navy rising to the rank of captain. In 1737 he transferred to the Russian Navy where he was appointed to the rank of vice admiral. He was tasked with overseeing a series of reforms in the country's fleet. He was appointed commander of the Kronstadt Naval Base near St Petersburg. He left Russian service in 1742.

== Bibliography ==
- Clark, George B. Irish Soldiers in Europe: 17th-19th Century. Mercier Press, 2010.
