= Misty Eyed Adventures =

Studio album by Moya Brennan
- Released: November 1994
- Recorded: Scotland, 1994
- Genre: Celtic rock
- Length: 56:36
- Label: BMG Records (UK); Atlantic (USA)
- Producer: Calum Malcolm and Dónal Lunny "Big Yellow Taxi" by The Blue Nile

Moya Brennan chronology
Máire (1992)	Misty Eyed Adventures (1994)	Perfect Time (1998)

Misty Eyed Adventures is a music album by Irish musician Máire Brennan, now known as Moya Brennan. This was the second solo outing for her and features many of her family and friends on the recording. It was released in 1995.

Recordings were made in Scotland during 1995:

- Castle Sound Studio, Pencaitland – (Engineer Calum Malcolm)

Additional recordings:

- Windmill Lane Studios, Dublin, Ireland – (Engineer Charles Byrne) (for Big Yellow Taxi)
- Barrymore Studios, Co. Clare, Ireland – (Engineer Colin Boland) (for A Place Among The Stones)

== Track listing ==
1. "The Days of the Dancing" – 5:26
2. "A Place Among the Stones" – 6:45 (produced by Davy Spillane & Greg Boland)
3. "The Watchman" – 5:46
4. "An Fharraige" – 5:04
5. "Pilgrim's Way" – 4:17
6. "Big Yellow Taxi" – 4:10 (produced by The Blue Nile)
7. "The Mighty One" – 4:34
8. "Heroes" – 6:20
9. "Misty Eyed Adventures" – 5:34
10. "Dream On" – 4:38
11. "Éirigh Suas a Stóirín" – 4:02

== Personnel ==
=== Band ===
- Moya Brennan – vocals, harp, keyboards
- Deirdre Brennan – vocals
- Olive Brennan – vocals
- Brídín Brennan – vocals
- Nigel Thomas – drums
- Nico Bruce – bass
- Anthony Drennan - electic & acoustic guitars, dobro
- Davy Spillane – Uilleann pipes, low whistles
- Dónal Lunny – acoustic & electric bouzouki, bodhrán, keyboards
- Calum Malcolm – keyboards, synth bass

=== Additional musicians ===
- Paul Buchanan – Acoustic Guitar (on Big Yellow Taxi)
- P.J. Moore – Keyboards (on Big Yellow Taxi)
- Robert Bell – Bass, Keyboards (on Big Yellow Taxi)
- Greg Boland – Electric Guitar (on A Place Among The Stones)
- Noel Eccles – Percussion (on A Place Among The Stones)
- James Delaney – Keyboards (on A Place Among The Stones)
- Eoghan O'Neill – Bass (on A Place Among The Stones)

== Promotional singles ==
1. "Big Yellow Taxi"
2. "The Days of the Dancing"

== Release details ==
- 1994, UK, BMG Records 7432 123355 2, Release Date ? November 1994, CD
- 1994, UK, BMG Records 7432 123355 4, Release Date ? November 1994, Cassette
- 1994, USA, Atlantic Records 82701 2, Release Date ? November 1994, CD
- 1994, Japan, BMG Records BVCP 784, Release Date ? November 1994, CD
