= Circle of Friends =

Circle of Friends may refer to:

- A social group, also known as a circle of friends
- Circle of Friends (disabled care), a method in social care
- Circle of Friends (novel), a 1990 novel by Maeve Binchy
- Circle of Friends (1995 film), a film based on Binchy's novel
- "Circle of Friends", a song on the Better Than Ezra album Surprise
- "Circle of Friends", a song on the Point of Grace album Life Love & Other Mysteries
- Circle of Friends (Dexter), an episode of the television series Dexter
- Circle of Friends (Bob Mould video), a 2005 DVD by Bob Mould
- The Circle of Friends, a cult operating in Morristown, New Jersey and Washington DC from the 1970s.
- Kuklos Adelphon, the translated name of an American social fraternity founded in 1812.
