= Chris O'Brien (rugby) =

Wales international rugby league footballer

Personal information
- Full name: Christopher O'Brien
- Born: 16 November 1950 (age 76) Newtown, Cardiff, Wales

Playing information

Rugby union
Club
Years	Team	Pld	T	G	FG	P
≤1972–72	Fairwater RFC

Rugby league
- Position: Fullback, Wing, Second-row
Club
Years	Team	Pld	T	G	FG	P
1972–80	Oldham	109	19	1	0	59
1981–≥84	Cardiff City Blue Dragons
	Total	109	19	1	0	59
Representative
Years	Team	Pld	T	G	FG	P
1984	Wales	1

Christopher O'Brien (born 16 November 1950) is a Welsh former rugby union and professional rugby league footballer who played in the 1970s and 1980s. He played club level rugby union (RU) for Fairwater RFC (see Rugby in Cardiff), and representative level rugby league (RL) for Wales, and at club level for Oldham and Cardiff City Blue Dragons, as a fullback or wing, and later as a second-row.

== Background ==
O'Brien was born in Newtown, Cardiff, Wales.

== International honours ==
Chris O'Brien won a cap for Wales (RL) while at Cardiff City (Bridgend) Blue Dragons in the 9–28 defeat by England on Sunday 14 October 1984 at Eugene Cross Park, Ebbw Vale.
