= Signature (Moya Brennan album) =

Studio album by Moya Brennan
- Released: October 9, 2006
- Recorded: 2006
- Genre: Celtic rock
- Label: Universal Records

Moya Brennan chronology
An Irish Christmas (2005)	Signature (2006)	Heart Strings (2008)

Singles from Signature
- 1. "No One Talks" Released: 2007; 2. "Merry-Go-Round" Released: 2007

Live edition bonus cd

Professional ratings
Review scores
Source	Rating
Christianity Today	3.5/5 stars
Hot Press	3.5/5 stars

Signature is a music album by Irish musician Moya Brennan. This is her seventh solo album to be released. It was released on the 9 October 2006 in Ireland, the UK and the Netherlands. The worldwide release was scheduled for early 2007, but was temporarily delayed until 25 September 2007.

== Release ==
Announcement from her official site:

Sunday, 16 July 2006

"In the last few days Moya has completed the recording and mixing of her new album entitled Signature. Release is planned in Europe for late September but check back here for release dates in specific places. We can now reveal the track listing for the album (and we anticipate that some of the titles will give rise to discussion!)"

Snip from her official website on 'Signature'

Signature looks back Moya's life and experiences through a collection of twelve tracks. The album is a mix between contemporary and traditional Irish music.

== Track listing ==
1. "Purple Haze"
2. "No One Talks"
3. "Merry-Go-Round"
4. "I Will Find You" – only on worldwide release
5. "Always"
6. "Tapestry"
7. "Black Night"
8. "Hear My Prayer"
9. "Never Stray Far Away"
10. "Many Faces"
11. "Hidden Stories"
12. "Gone Are the Days"
13. "Pill A Rún Ó"
14. "Merry-Go-Round" (Special Branch Mix) – only on special editions

== Singles ==
1. "No One Talks"
2. "Merry-Go-Round"

== Special Tour Edition ==
The Special Tour Edition is a re-release of the album Signature, including a new bonus CD with five live tracks. All tracks were recorded live in Castleblaney, County Monaghan, Ireland.

=== Track listing ===
1. "Purple Haze"
2. "No One Talks"
3. "Merry-Go-Round"
4. "Always"
5. "Tapestry"
6. "Black Night"
7. "Hear My Prayer"
8. "Never Stray Far Away"
9. "Many Faces"
10. "Hidden Stories"
11. "Gone Are the Days"
12. "Pill A Rún Ó"

Bonus Tracks

1. "Pill A Rún Ó"
2. "Black Night"
3. "Many Faces"
4. "Tapestry"
5. "Gone Are the Days"

== Release history ==
Country	Release date
Ireland	October 9, 2006
UK	October 9, 2006
Netherlands	October 9, 2006
Worldwide	September 25, 2007
