= Máire Breatnach =

Irish fiddler and singer

Dr Máire Breatnach
- Born: 1956 (age 68–69); Dublin, Ireland
- Education: University College Dublin (B.A., B.Mus., M.A.); University of Limerick (M.A.); Dublin City University (PhD, 2013)
- Occupation: Fiddle, violin and viola player
- Musical career
- Origin: Dublin, Ireland
- Genres: Celtic; Irish traditional
- Website: mairebreatnach.com

Máire Breatnach (Irish pronunciation: [ˈmˠɑːɾʲə ˈbʲɾʲan̪ˠəx]) is an Irish fiddle, violin and viola player. She also sings in Irish on some of her albums. Since the early 1990s, she has recorded five solo albums, participated in many collaborations, and developed didactic material for children, mostly in Irish.

== Early life ==
Born in Dublin, Máire Breatnach obtained a B.A., B.Mus. and M.A. degrees at University College Dublin, in Dublin where she lectured, as she also did in the College of Music, DIT before starting a freelance career as a performing musician. She later obtained a further M.A., in Ethnomusicology, from the University of Limerick, and a PhD from Dublin City University in 2013.

== Music career ==
Breatnach is best known for her fiddle playing, and has been a prolific solo player as well as participating in a number of traditional and neo-traditional groups. She sings in Irish on some of her albums, and her composition Éist was an award-winning single.

She has worked with the bands of Sharon Shannon, Moya Brennan (of Clannad), and Mary Black, and features on albums by musicians as diverse as Dolores Keane, Mike Oldfield, Alan Stivell, Bryan Adams, Anúna, Matthias Kießling, Dónal Lunny, Brian Kennedy, Ronan Keating, John Renbourn, and The Chieftains.

In the mid-1990s, Máire was the original fiddle player in the Bill Whelan-composed stage show Riverdance, and subsequent soundtrack album. The show's main theme was performed (and was a huge hit) at the 1992 Eurovision Song Contest, representing Ireland. She can be seen and heard playing on the original Riverdance DVD/VHS, starring Michael Flatley and Jean Butler.

Máire has also played on the Celtic arrangement album Final Fantasy IV: Celtic Moon, and with Yasunori Mitsuda on the arranged soundtrack to Xenogears, titled Creid, as well as featuring on albums by Chiaki Ishikawa and Mimori Yusa. Her collaboration with Thomas Loefke and Norland Wind is recorded on the CDs Norland Wind, Atlantic Driftwood, Northern Isles and Departures.

Máire's TV and film credits include Glenroe, Tinteán, and Voyage (part of the Waterways series), all on RTÉ; A Freezing Summer (Japan), Angela Mooney Dies Again, In the Name of the Father, The Secret of Roan Inish, Rob Roy and Moondance.

== Writing and academic career ==
Breatnach has written a traditional/folk music column for the Irish language weekly newspaper Anois and later for the monthly magazine Comhar.

Since 2007, Breatnach has been involved in the preparation of CDs and books to accompany a range of Irish language material aimed at the Naíonra and early-reading age groups. Máire has produced, composed incidental music and performed on a range of instruments for more than 40 titles, as well as narrating many of them. Her first book, Vera agus a Veidhlín, a children's musical story, illustrated by Robert Ballagh, was published in Dublin by An Gúm in 2008.

In 2013, she was conferred with a PhD by Dublin City University for her study, undertaken in St Patrick's College, Drumcondra, of the acquisition and transmission of sean-nós singing, Iomramh Aonair na nAmhrán: Sealbhú agus Seachadadh Thraidisiún an tSean-nóis i gComhthéacsanna 'Neamhthraidisiúnta'.

In 2022, Oidhreacht Chorca Dhuibhne published Breatnach's second book for children, Mábúis – Cat ar Misean, illustrated by Dómhnal Ó Bric and aimed at readers in the 10-14 age group.

== Selected discography ==
=== Solo ===
- Angels' Candles (1993)
- The Voyage of Bran (1994)
- Celtic Lovers (1997)
- Angels' Candles/Coinnle na nAingeal (1999)
- Dreams and Visions in Irish Song / Aislingí Ceoil (2002)
- Cranna Ceoil / In Full Measure (2009)

=== Collaborations ===
- Riverdance: Music from the Show (1995)
- Tarraing Téad / Pulling Strings (with Cormac De Barra) (2010)
