= The Coolin =

Irish song

The Coolin, or The Coolun, is an Irish air often characterised as one of the most beautiful in the traditional repertoire.

In Irish, its name has been given as An Chúileann or An Chúilfhionn ("the fair haired girl" or "the fair lady") depending on the text used. The tune is also known as "The Lady of the Desert".

== History ==
The air, and the texts fitted to it, have a long and very complex history. Its exact provenance is unknown, but it has been variously asserted by different authors as dating from the 13th century, from the time of Henry VIII, or from the 17th century, though the latter is the most credible. There are at least two main Irish language texts and a number of later English translations, or interpretations of both; there are also English words (such as those by Moore) which are not a translation of either Irish version.

=== The air ===
The air itself is sometimes claimed to have been composed by Carolan, though John Glen (1900) said that the "ancient Irish melody" was in fact usually known as "Molly St George" at the beginning of the 18th century. The latter-named tune has been often been associated with the great 17th-century harper Thomas Connellan. Connellan was also cited alongside Carolan as a possible composer of The Coolin, but as Glen noted, many supposed "that the tune is older than either of them".

The version of The Coolin printed by Edward Bunting in The Ancient Music of Ireland (1840) was taken from the playing of Donnchadh Ó Hámsaigh (Dennis Hempson), who himself claimed to have learned it from the playing of Cornelius Lyons early in the previous century. Though Bunting's setting claims to present the tune with variations, it in fact appears to print only Lyons' once-fashionable baroque variations while omitting the main tune. Patrick Weston Joyce, who said that Bunting's version was "wanting in simplicity", printed a version of the tune collected from the playing of a fiddler, Hugh O'Beirne, that he said was very similar to that he recalled being sung in his youth in 1830s County Limerick.

Other versions appeared in several late 18th century collections, as well as in the 1795 opera The Wicklow Mountains, written by John O'Keeffe with music by William Shield.

=== Claimed 13th or 16th century origins ===
These suggestions originated with Joseph Cooper Walker, who said in his Historical Memoirs of the Irish Bards (1786) that the air's title in fact referred to what he called the "coulins", or long locks of hair, worn by Irish men and which were prohibited by a statute of Henry VIII, although he noted that no actual words to the air on this subject had survived. Despite the lack of a text, Walker's assertion was repeated by, amongst others, Renehan and W. H. Grattan Flood: Flood however proposed (based on a suggestion by Lynch in a letter to the Dublin Penny Journal) the air must refer to an earlier statute of the 13th century. The story inspired a 19th-century patriotic poem called The Coulin Forbidden, written by W. B. McBurney under the pseudonym "Carroll Malone".

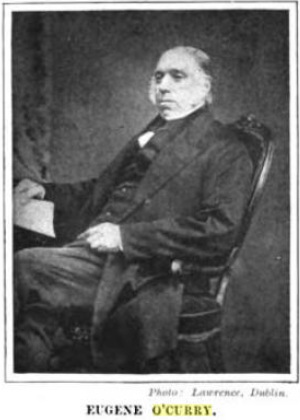
The distinguished philologist Eugene O'Curry believed that the air known as The Coolin was first given that name in the early 18th century by a Fr. Oliver O'Hanley.

The philologist Eugene O'Curry asserted, however, that the title "The Coolin" was only applied to the air in the 18th century after it was used by a priest, Fr. Oliver O'Hanley, to set a poem he wrote in praise of a famous beauty of County Limerick. In this case, O'Curry commented, the word "Coolin" is used in its sense "fair-haired one", to refer to a girl: he disagrees with Walker, stating "no such word was ever, or ever could have been, applied to the glibbs, or long tufts of back hair, prohibited by old English statute".

The Rev. L. Donnellan, in a survey of the various texts and tunes of The Coolin, published in the 1912 Journal of the County Louth Archaeological Society, was equally dismissive: he states that Walker's "credulous" story of it referring to an English statute was "fabricated by his friend [William] Beauford". He also notes that what he called Walker's "foolish speculation" was encouraged by his insertion of the phrase "glibbs and coulins" into the 16th century statute, which he notes only refers to proscribed "glibbs". Donnellan's conclusion was that the original composition was a 17th-century one attributed to O Duagain (see below).

=== Text attributed to Ó Duagáin ===
The oldest and best-known Irish text definitely associated with the tune is a love-poem addressed to a fair-haired girl (cúilfhionn); this is attributed to a poet called Muiris Ó Duagáin or Maurice O'Dugan of Benburb and said to have been written in around 1641. English translations of this text have been written by Sir Samuel Ferguson (beginning "O have you seen the Coolun") and Thomas Furlong, amongst others. The latter was printed by James Hardiman, along with Ó Duagaáin's original text, in his collection Irish Minstrelsy (1831).

A version of Ó Duagáin of Benburb's poem was also printed, with translations, in Douglas Hyde's Love Songs of Connacht (1893), with the first line A's éirigh do shuidhe a bhuachaill a's gléus dam mo ghearrán ("And rise up lad, and get ready for me my nag"). Hyde omits two stanzas already printed by Hardiman, and describes this as a version collected in Connacht.

Donnellan, after dismissing Walker, Grattan Flood and O'Curry's other suggestions, states that the probability "is that O'Dugan of Benburb did compose a poem with this air perhaps substantially the same as the different versions given by Hardiman, Vol. I., p. 251; O'Daly, p. 155; and Dr. Hyde, pp. 70-73 in the Love Songs of Connacht".

=== Text attributed to O'Hanley ===
Writing in the early 1800s, O'Curry said that the title "The Coolin" was first applied to the air in the 18th century after it was used by a poet, Father Oliver O'Hanley (fl. 1700–1750), to set an Irish-language poem he had written in praise of Nelly O'Grady, a celebrated beauty of County Limerick. This text, beginning Ceó meala lá seaca, ar choilltibh dubha baraighe ("A honey mist on a day of frost, in a dark oak wood"), and which is addressed to Neilidh ("Nelly") was printed by Hyde, who said it was written in a manuscript originating in County Clare, though the manuscript was partly damaged and he could not read two stanzas.

=== Other texts ===
Hyde noted the existence of what he called a Munster version of the poem, given in O'Daly's The poets and poetry of Munster (1850). This shares some material with that attributed to Ó Duagáin, but is only three stanzas long and includes a reference to a member of the Power family.

Another well-known text was written for the air in English by the poet Thomas Moore, usually known by its first line Though the last glimpse of Erin. It is not a translation of any of the earlier Irish versions. Donnellan noted that the version of the air used by Moore was substantially "correct and unaltered", particularly in comparison to Bunting's, when compared with early 19th and late 18th century copies of the tune, though it still showed some evidence of having been adapted by an "instrumentalist".

== Text ==
The following is the early 19th century translation of Ó Duagáin's text by Ferguson:

O have you seen the Coolun,
Walking down the cuckoo's street,
With the dew of the meadow shining
On her milk-white twinkling feet!
My love she is, and my coleen oge,
And she dwells in Bal'nagar;
And she bears the palm of beauty bright,
From the fairest that in Erin are.

In Bal'nagar is the Coolun
Like the berry on the bough her cheek;
Bright beauty dwells for ever
On her fair neck and ringlets sleek;
Oh, sweeter is her mouth's soft music
Than the lark or thrush at dawn,
Or the blackbird in the greenwood singing
Farewell to the setting sun.

Rise up, my boy! make ready
My horse, for I forth would ride,
To follow the modest damsel,
Where she walks on the green hillside;
Where since our youth were we plighted,
In faith, troth, and wedlock true -
She is sweeter to me nine times over,
Than organ or cuckoo!

For, ever since my childhood
I loved the fair and darling child;
But our people came between us,
And with lucre our pure love defiled;
Ah, my woe it is, and my bitter pain,
And I weep it night and day,
That the coleen bawn of my early love,
Is torn from my heart away.

Sweetheart and faithful treasure,
Be constant still and true;
Nor for want of herds and houses
Leave one who would ne'er leave you,
I'll pledge you the blessed Bible,
Without and eke within,
That the faithful God will provide for us,
Without thanks to kith or kin.

Oh, love, do you remember
When we lay all night alone,
Beneath the ash in the winter storm
When the oak wood round did groan?
No shelter then from the blast had we,
The bitter blast or sleet,
But your gown to wrap about our heads,
And my coat around our feet.

== Historic performances ==
The Coolin was a popular part of the Irish harp repertoire of the 18th century. Charles Fanning won first prize at the Belfast Harp Festival of 1792 with a performance of The Coolin, repeating his success at the earlier Granard harp festivals with the same tune. Bunting appears to have disapproved of Fanning's performance at Belfast, noting that he "was not the best performer, but he succeeded in getting the first prize by playing 'The Coolin' with modern variations, a piece of music at the time much in request by young practitioners on the piano-forte".

After the decline of Irish harping in the early 19th century, the air became equally popular as an instrumental piece with fiddle players and pipers. Recordings of The Coolin exist by Dominic Behan, Leo Rowsome, Johnny Doran and Willie Clancy, amongst others.

== Voříšek Setting & Variations ==
The piano solo (op. 19) by the Czech composer Jan Václav Voříšek is a set of variations on the tune.

== Samuel Barber setting ==
The composer Samuel Barber published a setting of The Coolin in 1942 for unaccompanied chorus, based on a text originally published by James Stephens in the collection Reincarnations. Stephens said that his poem, "The Coolun", was based on another by "Raftery", but seems to bear some similarity to parts of the O'Hanley text Ceó meala lá seaca, ar choilltibh dubha baraighe.

== In film and other media ==
- The musical air is used in Pasolini's film The Canterbury Tales as the musical theme of Pluto and Persephone in The Merchant's Tale. The soothing, pastoral nature of the melody is very suitable for the mythological deities in this lighthearted, ribald tale.
- The Coolin is featured at the end of Northern Exposure season 4 episode 20, "Homesick", as Mike Monroe, one of the series' recurring characters, having been cured of his multiple chemical sensitivity, departs to join Greenpeace.
