= Rose Mooney =

Irish harpist (born c. 1740)

Rose Mooney (born c. 1740) was an itinerant Irish harpist during the 18th century, a time when the itinerant tradition was dying out.

== Early life ==
Rose Mooney came from a poor background in County Meath. Like many harpists of the time, she was blind. Mooney learned how to play from Thady Elliott. With her maid Mary for a companion, she traveled Ireland for different harpist competitions.

== Harp festivals ==
=== Granard Harp Festival ===
The memoirs of harpist Arthur O'Neill contain records of Mooney's experience at the Granard Festivals. She was the only woman to compete in the Granard festival of 1781. Third place and five guineas went to Mooney for her rendering of Planxty Burke. She continued to participate, and won third place in the 2nd and 3rd Granard festivals of 1782 and 1783. This time her reward was four guineas. She participated in the last two festivals of 1784 and 1785 as well, but it is unclear where she placed. From the second festival, she was not the only woman competitor, as Catherine Martin also participated.

=== Belfast Harp Festival ===
In 1792, founding Belfast Reading Society members Henry Joy McCracken and Dr. James McDonnel called on the Harpers Assembly in Belfast to revive the Ancient tradition of the harp. The festival ran from 11 July to 14 July 1792. Mooney, then 52, participated. She rehearsed with the rest of the harpers in public until the final show in the assembly rooms. 15 judges presided. Edward Bunting attended the festival to transcribe the harp music into a manuscript to preserve it. The result of Mooney's participation in the festival is unknown, as it seems the judges awarded only a first and second place, and no information about the rest of the participants is available.

According to Arthur O'Neill, Mooney "...pledged her harp, petticoat, and cloak." He made this statement to expose Mooney's maid, Mary, who seems to have taken advantage of her mistress' blindness by pawning her items to buy herself alcohol. Mary led Mooney into seedy establishments that were "inseparable for poor blind harpers."

== Death ==
The date and circumstances of Mooney's death are unclear. According to O'Neill, she died during the French invasion of Killala in 1798 as a victim of drink. However, Edward Bunting notes Planxty Charles Coot as having been taken down from "Rose Mooney the harper in 1800."
