= Dominic Ó Mongain =

Dominic Ó Mongáin, or Dominic Mungan, was an Irish harper and poet, born around 1715 in County Tyrone. The poem and air An raibh tú ag an gCarraig?, translated by Walsh as Have you been at Carrick?, has been attributed to him.

He was the father of Charles Warburton, an Anglican bishop who served as both Bishop of Limerick and Bishop of Cloyne.

== Life ==
Relatively little is known of his life. The harper Arthur O'Neill mentioned him in his memoirs, stating that Ó Mongáin (Mungan) lived in Strabane, and had previously taught him several tunes, none of which he could now remember:

In my travels I became acquainted with a Dominic Mungan, I may say I had known him since I was twelve years old. He was born blind in the County of Tyrone, and a real good harper. He was a Roman Catholic. [...] He was a great economist, but would spend money as genteelly as any man occasionally. He had three sons, Mark, John, and Terence, whom he educated in the first style.

A blind harper named Dominic Mungan, almost certainly the same man, was noted by Edward Bunting to have been born around 1715 in Tyrone, and was said to have been an "admirable performer", particularly skilled in quiet passages, and conversant with the music of Handel and Corelli in addition to the traditional harp repertoire. Bunting, who obtained his information on Mungan from the reminiscences of Henry Joy, uncle of Henry Joy McCracken, also noted that Mungan raised three sons, one of whom was the future bishop Charles Mongan Warburton. O'Neill had mentioned that Mungan's son Terence "was now Bishop of Limerick".

Ó Mongáin appeared in 1762 in Belfast - the first reference to the harp being played there - where a press notice stated that "Dominick the Harper" thanked those who had "been so kind as to favour him with their company" and gave notice of a further performance at "Tim's Coffee House" on the following Monday.

Ó Doibhlin noted a further record of a "Domini Mungan of Tyrone":

[...] listed by Echlin O'Kean [...] as one of four second rate players on the harp alive in 1797/1798. His surname possibly indicates that he was a native of Termonmongan in the Castlederg area of Tyrone. Poetry writing and harp playing seem on occasions to have gone hand in hand in Gaelic Ireland, but O'Mongáin did not appear at the Harp Festival of 1792 in Belfast, and I have found no further references to him.

Ó Mongáin in fact appears to have died in the 1770s, long prior to the Harp Festival. Bunting had not personally heard him play, basing his description of his style on Joy's recollection, but said that "his 'whispering notes' were until lately in the memory of a few surviving auditors".

== Poetry and music ==
The poem An raibh tú ag an gCarraig?, translated by Walsh as Have you been at Carrick?, is ascribed to Ó Mongáin in John O'Daly's Poets and Poetry of Munster (1849), where it was printed along with Walsh's translation. Ó Mongáin was said to have written An raibh tú ag an gCarraig? in honour of Eliza Blacker (later Lady Dunkin) of Carrick in the parish of Seagoe, County Armagh.

The air printed in Bunting's Ancient Music of Ireland as Sin Sios agus suas liom, "Down beside me" and stated to be "the original of Shepherds, I have lost my Love", was said by Bunting to have been taken from a transcribed performance by Ó Mongáin.

== See also ==
- Belfast Harp Festival
