= Have you been at Carrick? =

"Have you been at Carrick?", also given as "Were you at the rock?" or, occasionally, "Were you at Carrick?", is the English name of a popular slow air originating in Ireland. The various titles are translations of the first line of the Irish text, "An raibh tú ag an gCarraig". "Have you been at Carrick" is the translation originally made in the 19th century by the Derry-born County Cork poet and Young Irelander, Edward Walsh.

== History ==
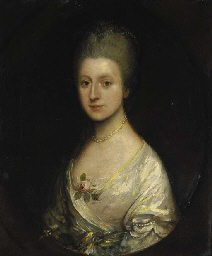
Elizabeth (Eliza) Blacker of Carrick, Armagh, said by John O'Daly to have inspired harpist Dominic Ó Mongain to write the air.

The song was well known by the first half of the 19th century, though most authors assume an earlier origin. Early versions of an Irish text, with translations, were printed in Walsh's Irish Popular Songs (1847) and John O'Daly's Poets and Poetry of Munster (1849). O'Daly firmly ascribed an 18th-century origin to the song and said it was written by Dominic Ó Mongain, a poet and harpist from County Tyrone, in honour of the society beauty Eliza Blacker of the townland of Carrick in the parish of Seagoe, County Armagh; she later became Lady Dunkin, on marrying Sir William Dunkin of Clogher. Walsh said only that he believed the song to have a "southern" origin, noting that Carrick was a common element in place names, while the song-collector Patrick Weston Joyce confirmed that he had commonly heard it sung in Munster.

== Text ==
Walsh described the text as follows: "In this truly Irish song, when the pining swain learns that his absent mistress is not love-sick like himself, he praises the beauty of her copious hair, throws off a glass to her health, enumerates his sufferings, and swears to forgo the sex for ever; but she suddenly bursts upon his view [...] and he greets his glorious maid with such a welcome as an Irish lover alone can give!" The version given by Walsh has six stanzas, or verses, in both Irish and English texts.

An alternative translation was made by Walsh's contemporary James Clarence Mangan under the title "The Lass of Carrick".

== Tune ==
The melody, as notated in O’Neill's Music of Ireland (1903), is in the mixolydian mode. This was based on a setting published in O'Daly's Poets and Poetry of Munster in 1849. Another version was published in Irish Music and Song (1888) by Joyce, who described O'Daly's setting as "so overladen with ornamental notes that the melody is quite obscured [...] I have given here, without any ornamentation, the simple vocal melody as I knew it from my earliest days". Joyce took the song's text from Edward Walsh's Irish Popular Songs.

Another version of the tune was also given by Edward Bunting (1796) under the title "Have you seen my Valentine"; O'Neill (1903) also printed a major-key variant, "The Charming Fair Maid".

Seán Ó Riada published an analysis of the song which stressed the motivic elements of its construction, showing that much of the melody is based on repetition, inversion or transposition of its opening phrase. Seamus Ennis, who gave many solo performances of the tune and helped popularise it as an instrumental air, noted that it fit the uilleann pipes well.

== Double meaning ==
A two-verse form of the air is sometimes stated to have been used in Ireland during the Penal era as a form of "code" to signify the holding Mass. In this interpretation, believed by Ennis, Seosamh Ó hÉanaí and others and perpetuated when the song was taught in schools, the first line refers to a mass rock rather than a placename and the singer's "Valentine" is a veiled reference to the Catholic Church. One early source is the 1937 story 'Carraig an Aifrinn' by Sean O Cuirinn, which bases a story of penal-era repression on "An raibh tu ag an gCarraig". Nevertheless, it is likely that the original, six-verse version was conceived as a love song, rather than an allegory. The musician and musicologist Tomás Ó Canainn has criticised what he calls "the attempt by the over-scrupulous to show that almost every love song is in reality a religious song", noting that "An Raibh tu ar an gCarraig [...] could be interpreted as a symbolic song about the Mass-rock, as long as it is realised that it is first of all a love song". Hugh Shields, in Narrative singing in Ireland, noted the subsequent imposition, in the popular imagination, of an interpretation "oddly at variance with the surface meaning" of the text as a powerful example of the "potential of songs to generate narrative".

== Recordings ==
The tune has been recorded many times, with versions existing by Ennis, Seosamh Ó hÉanaí (Joe Heaney), The Chieftains and others.

== Lyrics ==
The following text, using contemporary Irish orthography and translation, is given by Walsh, 1847, pp. 72–75:

An raiḃ tú ag an gCarraig, nó ḃ-faca tú féin mo ġraḋ,
Nó a ḃ-faca tú gile, finne, agus sgéiṁ na mná
Nó a ḃ-faca tú an t-uḃal ba cúbarṫa is ba ṁillse bláṫ
Nó a ḃ-faca tú mo valantíne no a ḃfuil sí da claoiḋ mar taím?

Do ḃíosa ag an gCarraig, is do ċonairc me féin do ġraḋ,
Do ċonairc mé gile, finne, agus sgéiṁ na mná,
Do ċonairc mé an t-uḃal ba cúbarṫa is ba ṁillse bláṫ
Do ċonairc mé do valantín agus níl sí da claoiḋ mar táir!

Is fiú cúig ġuinea gaċ riḃe da gruaig mar ór,
Is fiú oiread eile a crideaċta úair raiḃ ló;
A cúilín trom tripiliċ a tuitim léi síos go feóir
'Sa ċuaiċín na finne, ar ṁiste do sleinte d'ól

'N úair ḃím-se am ċoḋla bían osnaḋ gan ḃríg am ċlíaḃ,
Is mé am lúíḋ eadar cnocaiḃ go d-tigiḋ an dúaċ aníar;
A rúin ḋil s'a ċogair ní'l fortaċt mo ċúis aċt Dia,
Is go n-dearnaḋ loċ fola do solus mo súl ad diaiḋ!

Is go d-tigiḋ an ċáirg air lár an ḟoġṁair ḃuiḋe,
Is lá ḟéil Pátruig lá nó ḋó na ḋiaiġ,
Go ḃ-fása an bláṫ bán tre lár mo ċoṁra ċaol,
Paírt da ġraḋ go braṫ ní ṫaḃarfad do ṁnaoi!

Siúd í síos an Ríoġ-ḃean áluin óg,
A ḃfuil a grúaig léi sgaoilte síos go béal a bróg,
S i an eala í mar an lítir do síolraiġ ón t-sár ḟuil ṁór,
Ċaraid ġeal mo ċroiḋe, céad míle fáilte roṁat!

=== Translation ===
Have you been at Carrick, and saw my true-love there?
And saw you her features, all beautiful, bright, and fair?
Saw you the most fragrant, flowering, sweet apple-tree?—
Oh! saw you my loved one, and pines she in grief like me?

I have been at Carrick, and saw thy own true-love there;
And saw, too, her features, all beautiful, bright and fair;
And saw the most fragrant, flowering, sweet apple-tree—
I saw thy loved one—she pines not in grief, like thee!

Five guineas would price every tress of her golden hair—
Then think what a treasure her pillow at night to share,
These tresses thick-clustering and curling around her brow—
Oh, Ringlet of Fairness! I’ll drink to thy beauty now! !

When seeking to slumber, my bosom is rent with sighs—
I toss on my pillow till morning’s blest beams arise;
No aid, bright Beloved! can reach me save God above,
For a blood-lake is formed of the light of my eyes with love!

Until yellow Autumn shall usher the Paschal day,
And Patrick’s gay festival come in its train alway—
Although through my coffin the blossoming boughs shall grow,
My love on another I’ll never in life bestow!

Lo! yonder the maiden illustrious, queen-like, high,
With long-flowing tresses adown to her sandal-tie—
Swan, fair as the lily, descended of high degree,
A myriad of welcomes, dear maid of my heart, to thee!
