= Feardorcha O'Farrelly =

Feardorcha O'Farrelly (fl. 1736) was an Irish poet.

O'Farrelly appears to have been born in the late 17th century. He belonged to the Farrelly-family, of whom several members were abbots of Drumlane. Nothing appears to be known of the background of his mother. His father was John O'Farrelly of Mullagh, County Cavan, a farmer, historian and poet. Thus, Feardorcha O'Farrelly was brought up in a literary house, for his father wrote Seanchas an dá Bhreifne (The history of the two Brefnys), most of which his mother burnt in anger because the book deprived her of her husband's society. He wrote a poem on this incident and several others.

Feardorcha O'Farrelly studied for the Catholic priesthood. He was intended to be ordained but, according to local tradition, was excluded owing to some sacrilegious act of his family in the war of 1641. He became a farmer in Mullagh, enjoying local fame as a poet, and gaining the acquaintance of Turlough Carolan and Cathaoir MacCabe and other men of letters who flourished in that district early in the 18th century. His patrons were the Mortimer family of Lakeview House at Cloghballybeg, the chief landowners of the district.

== Works ==
Only five poems can now be attributed to him, surviving in manuscript form. He wrote a poem in Irish in praise of William Peppard of Kingscourt, of which there is a copy in the Cambridge University Library, made by Peter Galligan on 19 December 1827; Beir beannacht uaim sios go baile na ccraobh (A blessing from me on Ballynacroe),; Suibhal me cuig coige na Fodla (I walk the five provinces of Ireland); Bhidh me lá deas (I was one fine day) and others preserved in the manuscript books which formed the chief literature of farmhouses in the counties Meath and Cavan in the 18th century.

== See also ==
- Ó Fearghail
