= Patrick Byrne (musician) =

- Also known as: Pádraig Dall Ó Beirn
- Born: c. c. 1794; Magheracloone, County Monaghan, Ireland
- Died: Dundalk, Ireland
- Genres: Irish traditional music
- Occupation: Harper
- Instrument: Gaelic harp
- Years active: 1820s–1863

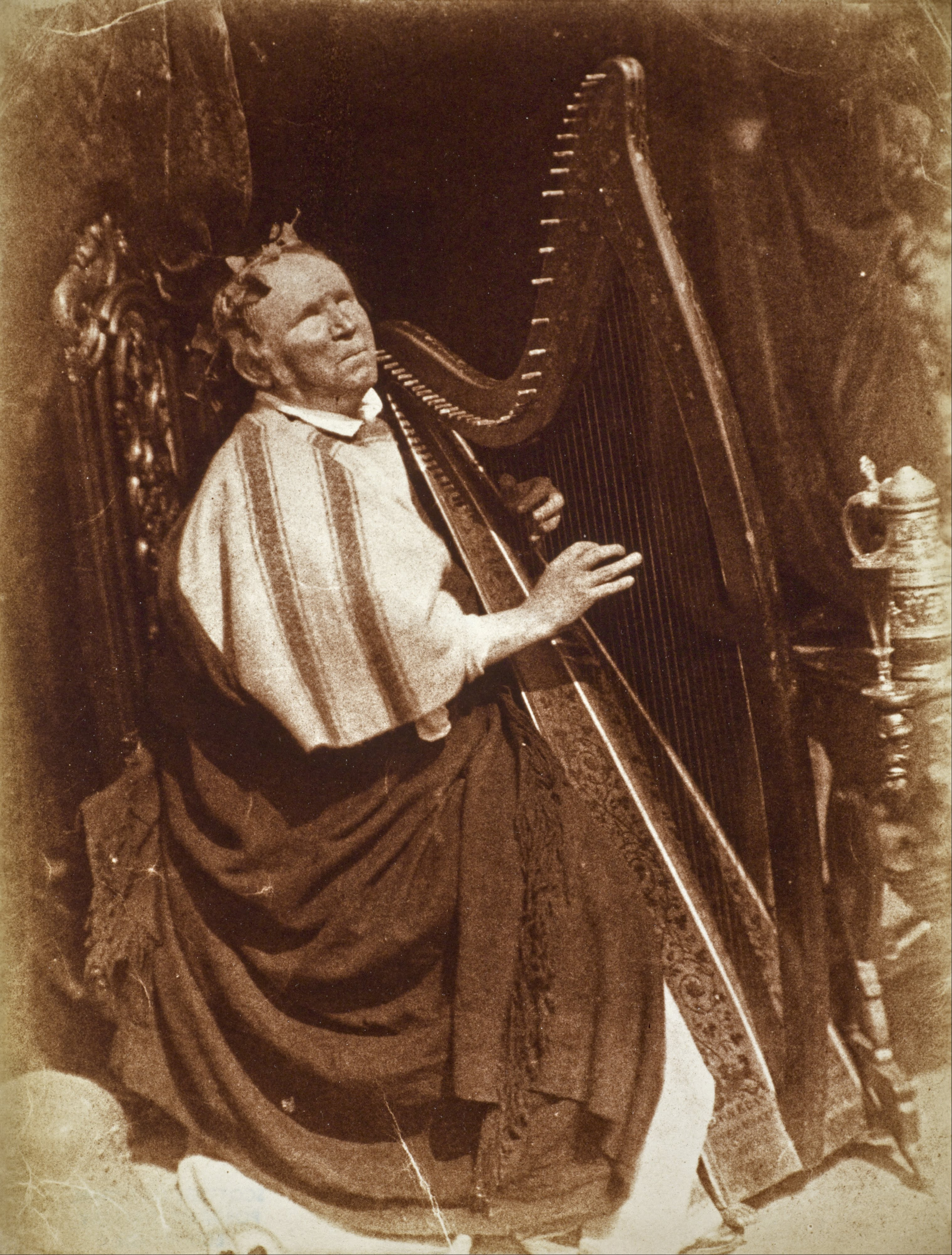
Photograph of Patrick Byrne by Hill & Adamson (1845), calotype print, 203 × 164 mm, Scottish National Gallery

Patrick Byrne or Pádraig Dall Ó Beirn (c. 1794 – 8 April 1863) was the last noted exponent in Ireland of the historical Gaelic harp and the first Irish traditional musician to be photographed.

== Life and career ==
Following on from the Belfast Harp Festival of 1792 various attempts were made to revive the playing of the Irish harp (Irish: Cláirseach). An Irish Harp Society was established in the city and a harp school for young blind boys set up. Byrne, who was born around 1794 in the parish of Magheracloone, County Monaghan was enrolled as a pupil in the harp school in 1820. The Belfast Society records him as graduating in 1821 "having acquired considerable proficiency on the instrument (60 tunes)".

He then moved to London playing in various houses of the nobility and in 1829 was presented with a silver medal by the Shakespearean Club of Stratford on Avon in recognition of his abilities. From 1837 to 1845 he was based in Scotland where he played before Queen Victoria and received a warrant as Irish Harper to Prince Albert.

While in Edinburgh he was photographed on or around 1 April 1845 by Hill & Adamson. The series of calotype images taken by Hill & Adamson are thought to be the first photographs of any harpist worldwide and the first of a traditional Irish musician. Some examples of these images are held in the Scottish National Portrait Gallery.

Byrne returned to Ireland in 1846/47 and was employed by the Shirley family as their harper. He is recorded in several contemporary newspaper articles as being a celebrated and accomplished musician. One description says "his touch was singularly delicate yet equally firm. He could make the strings whisper like the sigh of the rising wind on a summer eve, or clang with a martial fierceness that made your pulses beat quicker" Edward Bunting collected two pieces from Patrick Byrne, Nurse Putting the Child to Sleep and Rose McWard. Among other tunes he is known to have played are An Chuilfhionn and Brian Boru's March.

In 1855 Patrick Byrne was honoured at a meeting in the Shirley Arms Hotel in Carrickmacross and presented with "a purse of gold collected from the inhabitants of his native town". He died in Dundalk on 8 April 1863 and is buried in Carrickmacross. Patrick Byrne's final resting place - in what is now known locally as ‘bully’s acre’ - is marked by a slate altar-tomb.

Described by the great collector of Irish music Francis O'Neill as "the last of the great Irish harpers", his death marked the passing of the old style of playing the Irish harp – a tradition stretching back hundreds of years. One other photograph is known to have been taken of Patrick Byrne in his later years and this was published in the Ulster Journal of Archaeology in 1911. There is no record of who took the photograph or when and where it was taken.

Since 2007 the local branch of Comhaltas Ceoltóirí Éireann have organised a weekend of music workshops in honour of Patrick Byrne. Called the Féile Patrick Byrne the festival is held annually on the weekend before Easter in and around Carrickmacross.
