= Catherine Martin =

Catherine Martin may refer to:

- Cathie Martin (born 1955), professor of plant sciences at the University of East Anglia
- Catherine Martin (designer) (born 1965), Australian costume designer, production designer, set designer and film producer
- Catherine Martin (piper), Irish piper
- Catherine Martin (journalist) (born 1919), journalist for The West Australian
- Catherine Edith Macauley Martin (1848–1937), Australian novelist
- Catherine Martin (politician), Irish Green Party politician
- Catherine Martin (director), Canadian film director and screenwriter
- Catherine Anne Martin, Mi'kmaw filmmaker and playwright
- Cathy Burnham Martin (born 1954), American author, actress and television news anchor

== See also ==
- Kate Martin (disambiguation)
- Kathy Martin (disambiguation)
- Martin (name)
