= Lurgan (disambiguation) =

Lurgan is a town in County Armagh, Northern Ireland.

Lurgan may also refer to:

== Places ==
Republic of Ireland

- Lurgan, County Cavan, a civil parish in County Cavan
- Lurgan, Kilkenny West, a townland in Kilkenny West civil parish, barony of Kilkenny West, County Westmeath
- Lurgan, Killare, a townland in Killare civil parish, barony of Rathconrath, County Westmeath
- Lurgan, Kilmanaghan, a townland in Kilmanaghan civil parish, barony of Kilcoursey, County Offaly

Note: Lurgan also applies to 14 other townlands in Northern Ireland and the Republic of Ireland

== See also ==
- Lurgan Branch
- Lurgan Celtic F.C.
- Lurgan College
- Lurgan Cricket Club
- Lurgan Mail
- Lurgan Subdivision
- Lurgan Town F.C.
- Lurganare
- Lurganure
- Lurganville
