= Mongan (surname) =

Mongan, Ó Mongàin
Origin
- Language: Irish Gaelic
- Meaning: "descendant (or grandson) of long-haired"
- Region of origin: Connacht, Munster and Ulster.

Other names
- Variant forms: Mangan, Mangham, Mangam, Mangin, Mangum, Mangon, Mingame, Mongain, Mongin, Mungan, Mungane, Mungin

Mongan is a surname of Irish origin. It is an Anglicisation of the Irish Gaelic Ó Mongáin. Mongáin comes from mongach, meaning long haired or maned. "Ó Mongáin" derives from the ancient and possibly pre-10th century Gaelic Ó Mongáin, therefore literally meaning 'descendant of the long-haired one'.

Three branches of this clan lived in ancient Ireland. These were a sept in Ulster which gave its name to the parish of Termonomongan in County Tyrone; the second was originally based upon Counties Cork and Tipperary, whilst the third sept lay in North Connacht. Early recordings include bearers such as Teag Managan, in the Hearth Tax rolls of 1665 for County Tipperary, and Patrick Mongan and Maria Flanagan, married at Kilbride in County Roscommon in 1845.

Notable people with the surname include:

- Agnes Mongan (1905–1996), American art historian
- Joseph Mongan (1880–1951), Irish politician
- John C. Mongan, American politician
- Charles Mongan Warburton (1754–1826), Anglican bishop
