= Charles Warburton =

Charles Mongan Warburton (born Terrence Charles Mongan; (Note: Most consistently spelled Mongan, but originally rendered in Irish as O'Mungan, and also spelled in English as Mungan and Mangan.) 1754–1826) was a 19th-century Anglican bishop who served two Irish Dioceses.

Mongan was originally a Roman Catholic who recanted and joined the Anglican community. His brother was a Catholic priest. Terence Mongan was Chaplain of the 62nd Regiment of Foot, before which point he was using the name Charles Mongan. He adopted the surname of Warburton (with the forenames Charles Mongan, or possibly Terrence Charles Mongan) by royal warrant in 1792 and, after serving as Dean of Ardagh (1790–1800) and then Clonmacnoise (1800–1806) was consecrated Bishop of Limerick on 13 July 1806. He was translated to Cloyne in 1820 and died in post on 9 August 1826, aged 72.

Arthur O'Neill in his memoirs gives the following interesting account of Mongan and his family: "In my travels I became acquainted with a Dominic Mungan, I may say I had known him since I was twelve years old. He was born blind in the County of Tyrone, and a real good harper. He was a Roman Catholic. I presume my following reason will plead an apology for mentioning his religion. He was a great economist, but would spend money as genteelly as any man occasionally. He had three sons, Mark, John, and Terence, whom he educated in the first style. Mark was educated for a priest, and finished his studies in France, in the College of Lombard, where he obtained upwards of forty premiums for his translations of Greek into French. After he finished his studies he came home, but in consequence of his intense application he fell into a decay, and died in his father's house in Strabane. John, the second son, was bred a physician, and practised in and about Monaghan, and the adjacent country, with good reputation. About five years ago as he was returning from the races of Middleton in Monaghan in his gig he was upset and smashed to pieces. Terence, the third and youngest son, is now Bishop of Limerick, and was formerly Dean of Ardagh. He had a good delivery, sung well, and acquired great interest. He and a priest O'Beirne, who was Chaplain to Lord Fitzwilliam when Lord-Lieutenant of Ireland, were promoted to their present ranks of Protestant Bishops. Now my reason for mentioning the Roman Catholic persuasion is this, that the doctor and the bishop both read their recantations; the doctor before and the bishop after their father's death. He in his lifetime used to travel the north-west circuit with his harp, and at one time, as he was playing for one of the Judges, he asked Dominic his reasons for not speaking to his son, the doctor, since he turned Protestant. 'My Lord' says Dominic, 'I spared no expense on him when he was unable to provide for himself; and assure your Lordship, I am no bigot; but I think it was his duty to consult me before he changed his religion. It was not, however, for the sake of religion he did so, but he fell in love with a young lady who was a Protestant. She informed him she could not have him as he was a Papist, on which he read his recantation, and then demanded her hand, on which, to his mortification, she scornfully informed him that she would be sorry to marry a turncoat."

== Notes ==
Church of Ireland titles
| Preceded by Thomas Barnard | Bishop of Limerick, Ardfert and Aghadoe; 1806–1820 | Succeeded by Thomas Elrington |
| Preceded by William Bennet | Bishop of Cloyne; 1820 –1826 | Succeeded by John Brinkley |
