= Kate Martin (disambiguation) =

Kate Martin (born 2000) is an American basketball player.

Kate Martin may also refer to:

- Kate Martin (jurist), director of the Center for National Security Studies
- Kate Martin (All My Children), fictional character in the American TV soap opera All My Children
- Kathy Mershon, fictional character in All My Children, born Kate Louise Martin, great-granddaughter of Kate Martin

== See also ==
- Katie Martin, Baroness Martin of Brockley, British political aide
- Katey Martin (born 1985), New Zealand cricket commentator and cricketer
- Catherine Martin (disambiguation)
