= Kathy Martin =

Kathy Martin may refer to:

- Kathy Martin (All My Children), a fictional character on the soap opera All My Children
- Kathy Sullivan (Australian politician) (born 1942), née Martin
- Kathy Martin (scientist), professor of ornithology

== See also ==
- Catherine Martin (disambiguation)
- Martin (name)
- Kathy Mar (born 1951), filk musician
