= Mangan (surname) =

Mangan (Irish name: Ó Mongáin)
- Language: Irish Gaelic

Origin
- Meaning: "descendant of Mongán"
- Region of origin: Connacht, County Limerick, and County Tyrone

Other names
- Variant form: Mongan

Mangan is an Irish surname anglicised from the Gaelic Ó Mongáin, meaning "descendant of Mongán". It was originally a byname for someone with a luxuriant head of hair (from mongach meaning "hair" or "mane").

== People ==
Notable people with the surname include:

- Alan Mangan, Irish Gaelic footballer
- Albert Mangan (1915–1993), American Olympic racewalker
- Andrew Mangan (writer), creator of Arsenal blog, Arseblog
- Andy Mangan (born 1986), English footballer
- Colm Mangan, Irish General
- Cyrille Mangan (born 1976), Cameroonian footballer
- Dan Mangan (born 1983), Canadian musician
- Fiona Mangan (born 1996), Irish road-cyclist
- Gene Mangan (1936–2025), Irish cyclist
- Jim Mangan (1929–2007), American baseball player
- Jack Mangan (1927–2013), Irish Gaelic footballer
- James Clarence Mangan (1803–1849), Irish poet
- James T. Mangan (1896–1970), author and eccentric
- Joseph Mangan, American aerospace engineer
- Josh Mangan (born 1986), Australian cricketer
- Kate Mangan (1904–1977), British artist, actress and journalist.
- Lou Mangan (1922–2015), Australian rules footballer
- Lucy Mangan, British journalist
- Luke Mangan (born 1970), Australian chef
- Mike Mangan (rugby union) (born 1975), American rugby union lock
- Mike Mangan (musician), American keyboard player
- Sherry Mangan (1904–1961), American writer, journalist, translator, editor, and book designer
- Simon Mangan (died 1906), Lord Lieutenant of Meath (1894–1906)
- Stephen Mangan (born 1968), English actor
- Tom Mangan (1926-1998), American politician and educator
- Tony Mangan (runner) (born 1957), Irish ultra distance runner
- Tricia Mangan (born 1997), American Olympic alpine skier
