= Cock Up Your Beaver =

1792 song and poem by Robert Burns

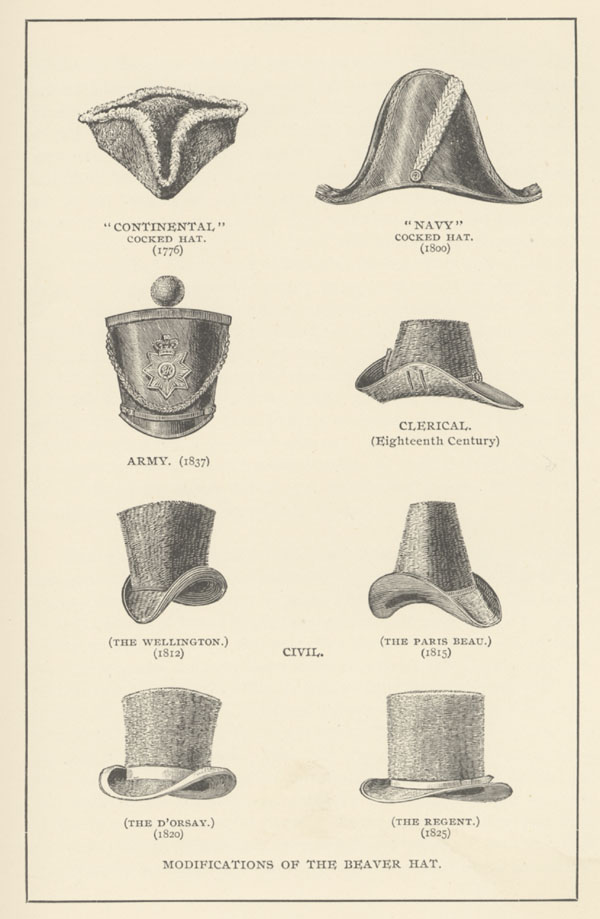
Various types of beaver hat

Cock Up Your Beaver is a song and poem by Robert Burns, written in 1792. It is written in Scottish dialect and the beaver refers to a gentleman's hat in an era when all high quality men's hats were made of felted beaver fur.

It was based on an older song, published as "Johnny, cock up thy Beaver". It is widely claimed that this is found in The Dancing Master, a collection of folk tunes published by John Playford of London in 1657. However, this is disputed by Scottish music scholar John Glen who correctly states it first appears in the 1686 edition of "The Dancing Master".

It was originally published in 1792 in volume 4 of the Scots Musical Museum and again in 1821 in a compilation by James Hogg, with four verses and musical notation of a tune.

The original version was English, and ridiculed Scotsmen who settled in London after the accession of James VI to the throne of England, possibly satirizing the costumes of highland chiefs entering the lowlands.

The song, hand-written by Burns, is in the Scots Musical Museum. In this version, the song works when sung as a round, with the last eight bars sung against the first eight bars. This may be the reason there is a double bar written at the end of the eighth bar.

A piece entitled Carolan's Variations on the Scottish Air "Cock Up Your Beaver" is composition no. 204 in the oeuvre of Turlough O'Carolan.
