= Catherine Martin (harper) =

18th-century Irish harpist

Catherine "Kate" Martin (fl. 18th-century, born Lurgan, Co. Cavan) was an Irish harper. W. H. Grattan Flood described Catherine Martin as a native of Co. Meath. She especially performed airs by Edward Sterling, the parson of Lurgan. She was one of two new candidates (with Edward MacDermot Roe) at the second Granard harp festival on 2 March 1782.
