= Carolan's Welcome =

Anton Emery plays "O'Carolan's Welcome"

Carolan's Welcome is a traditional air composed by the Irish harper/songwriter Turlough O'Carolan, (1670-1738). In Donal O'Sullivan's exhaustive book covering Carolan and all his songs, this piece is listed as the first of ten Carolan songs that do not have surviving titles. There it is identified only as number 171 in the Carolan repertoire. Nothing whatsoever is known about the origin of the tune (except that it is by Carolan), and no lyrics have been attributed to it.

The piece originally appeared in the William Forde manuscript (1845), with a copy in the John Edward Pigot manuscript (circa 1850). Both of these sources are now deposited in the Royal Irish Academy, Dublin. It was first formally published by Patrick Joyce in 1909.

The title Carolan's Welcome was given to this piece relatively recently, by The Chieftains, who adapted it as theme music on the occasion of Pope John Paul II's historic visit to Dublin in 1979. The title has been used universally since then, occasionally with variations or misspellings, such as "Carden's Welcome", "O'Carolan's Welcome", and "Carolan's Air". The song has been recorded by many artists, including Patrick Ball, David Wilcox (Canada), Lunasa, Mooncoin, and the Chieftains.
