= Cornelius Lyons =

Irish harper

Cornelius Lyons (c. 1670 – c.1740) was an Irish harper and composer active in the early eighteenth century. Born in County Kerry, he came to be the harper of the Earl of Antrim.

Donnchadh Ó hAmhsaigh, known in English as Denis Hempson was a great admirer of Cornelius Lyons. At the Belfast Harp Assembly of 1792, he played a number of Baroque-style variations that Lyons wrote on Irish traditional tunes such as "Eileen A Rún" and "The Coolin". Only one original piece by Lyons survives; this is "Miss Hamilton" (Inion i Hamilton), written in 1706.
