= Cathaoir MacCabe =

Irish poet and harper

Cathaoir MacCabe or Charles MacCabe (d. 1740) was an Irish poet and harper, whose name is written MacCaba in Irish.

Maccabe belonged to the family of the leaders of the gallowglasses of O'Reilly and was born near Mullagh, early in the reign of Charles II. He was throughout life the intimate friend of Turlough O'Carolan, who addressed a poem to him, Rath do cheirde fein ort (Here is the reward of your own art), and made another on a report, which proved to be false, of his death. MacCabe wrote a reply to some humorous verses of Carolan, Nil o Gailbhe fear da chapuill go Dun Phadraic (There is not a man who has two horses between Galway and Downpatrick), and a lament for Carolan, Do righneas smaointe do mheasas nar chuis naire (I have made some reflections which I think no cause of shame).

He died in 1740 and was buried in the churchyard near the well of Saint Ultan, with many of his clan, on the border of Breifny and in the barony of Castlerahan in County Cavan.

== Cultural depictions ==
In 1997, he was depicted as Charles MacCabe by Delaware artist Patrick Ball as the poet companion of the wandering Turlough O'Carolan in a one-man tribute to the latter, called O'Carolan's Farewell to Music.
