= Granard =

Town in County Longford, Ireland

Granard Irish: Gránard
- Town
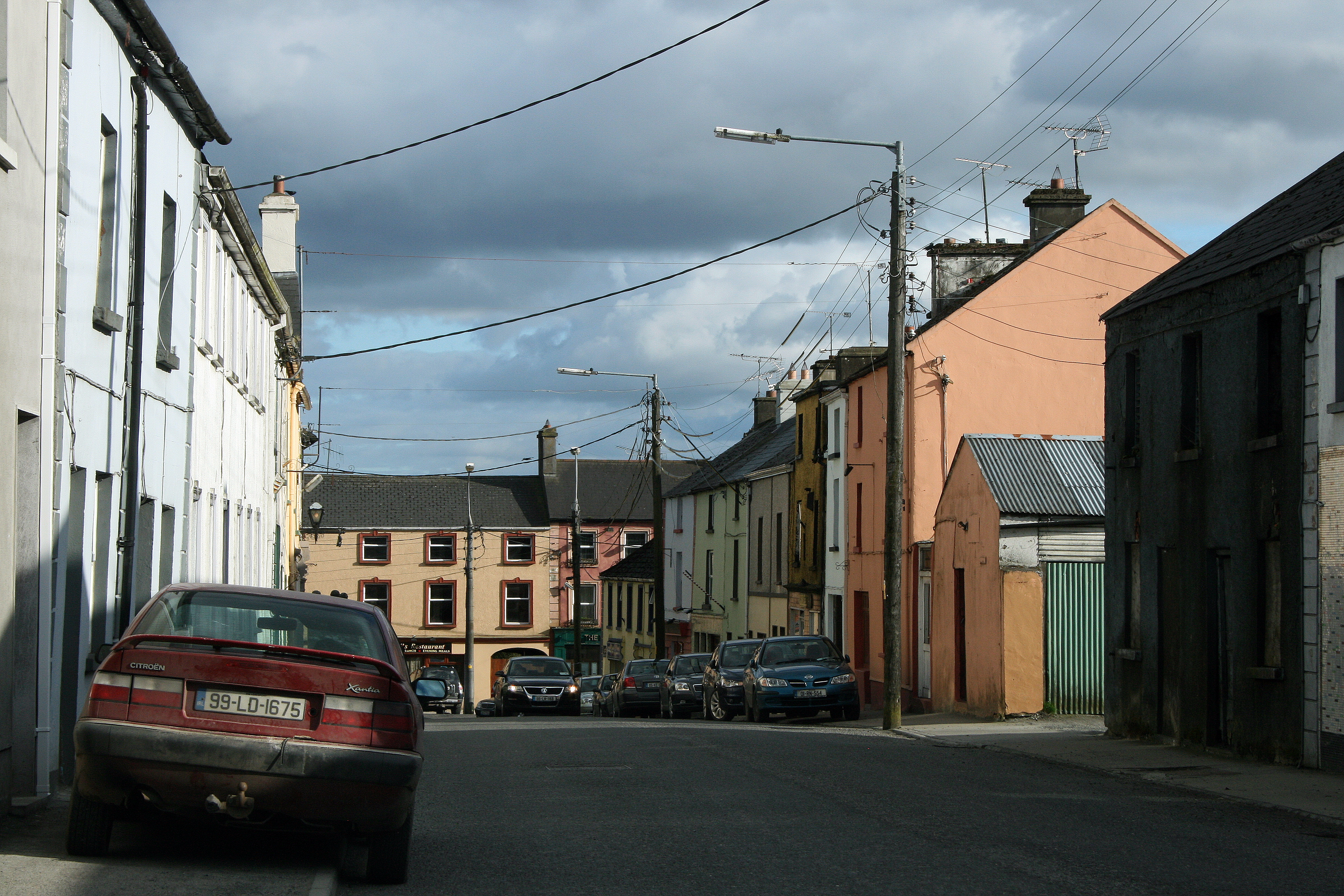
- Market Street
- Motto(s): Féile, Flúirse, Fáilte
- Location in Ireland
- Coordinates: 53°47′N 7°30′W
- Country: Ireland
- Province: Leinster
- County: County Longford
- Elevation: 82 m (269 ft)

Population (2022)
  - Total: 1,058
- Time zone: UTC±0 (WET)
  - Summer (DST): UTC+1 (IST)
- Eircode routing key: N39
- Telephone area code: +353(0)4366
- Irish Grid Reference: N324814
- Website: www.longfordcoco.ie

Granard (Irish: Gránard) is a town in the north of County Longford, Ireland, and has a traceable history going back to 236 CE. It is situated just south of the boundary between the watersheds of the Shannon and the Erne, at the point where the N55 national secondary road and the R194 regional road meet. It is 20 km north-east of Longford town. The barony of Granard is named for the town. The town is also in the civil parish of Granard.

== History ==
The town has been a centre of population since Celtic times, probably because of its elevated position offering a view over the surrounding countryside. It is mentioned in the ancient Irish epic, the Táin Bó Cuailgne, as being one of the places where Queen Medb and her army stopped on their journey to take the Donn Cuailnge (the Brown Bull of Cooley). The name of the village is itself so ancient as to be unclear even in Irish; the 11th-century writers of the Lebor na hUidre (containing the oldest written version of the Táin) refer to it by means of a gloss as "Gránairud Tethba tuaiscirt .i. Gránard indiu" ("Gránairud of northern Teathbha, i.e. Gránard of today"). According to the Tripartite Life of Saint Patrick, Patrick appointed Guasacht, a son of his former master Milchú, as first bishop of Granard, but the diocese did not survive as a separate entity. The surname Sheridan was first recorded in Granard in the 8th century.

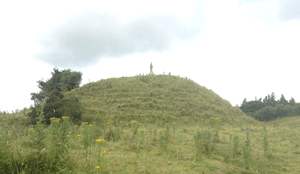
Granard Motte

Granard is known for the motte built by Risteárd de Tiúit. It stands 166 m (543 ft) above sea level, located at the head of the village. A statue of St Patrick was erected on the motte in 1932 to commemorate the 1500th anniversary of the coming of the saint to Ireland for the second time. Due to the location between the three rivers and near Lough Sheelin, it is also a centre for trout and coarse fishing. The Gaynors (Mag Fhionbharra, from Fionnbharr Ó Géaradháin) were once the Gaelic lords of Granard.

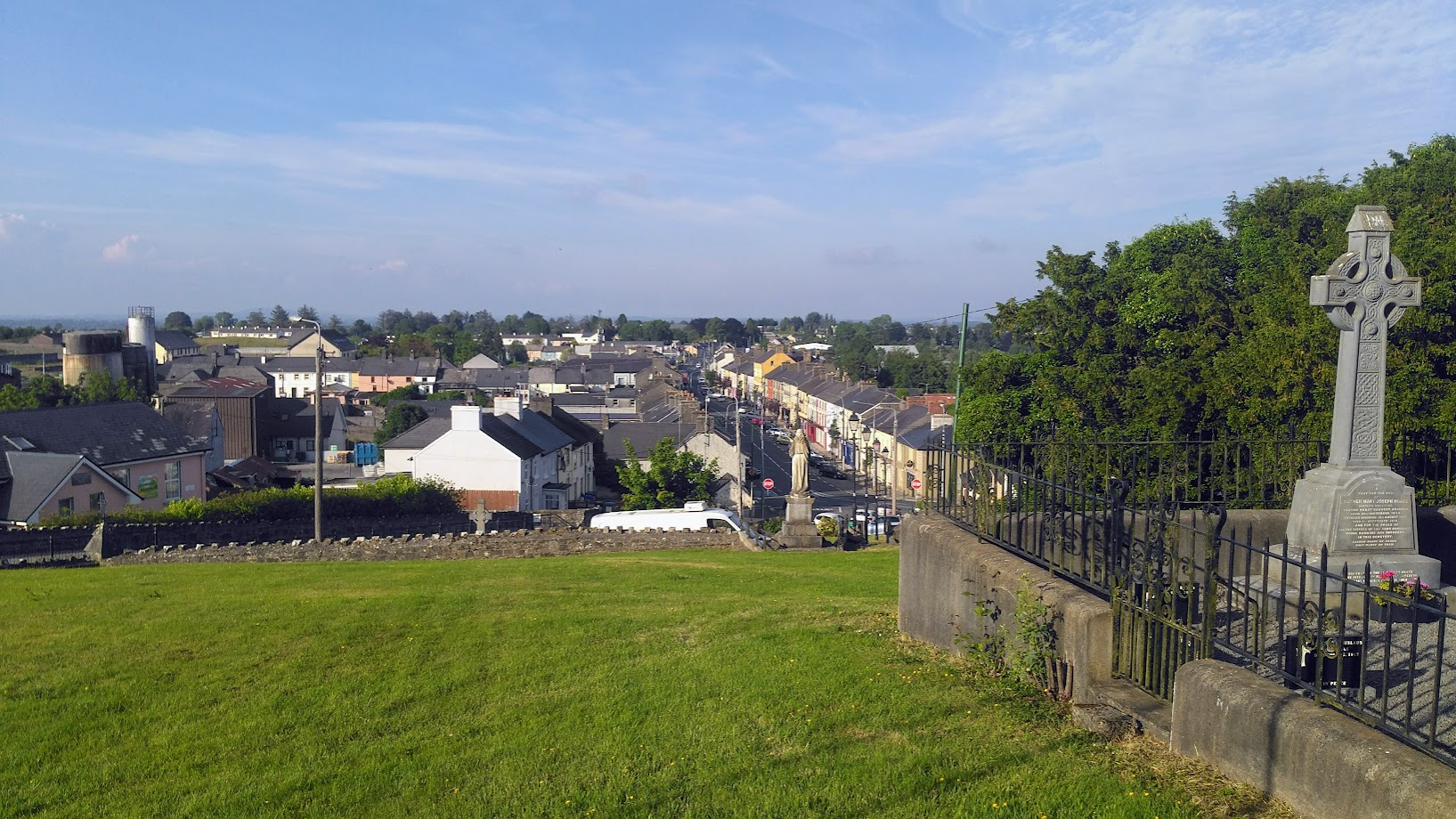
Granard town, facing north-eastward from the grounds of St. Mary's Catholic Church

Between 1780 and 1787, a large new market house was constructed in the town enhancing Granard's position as a market town for the local area. It was built under the patronage of the local McCartney family.

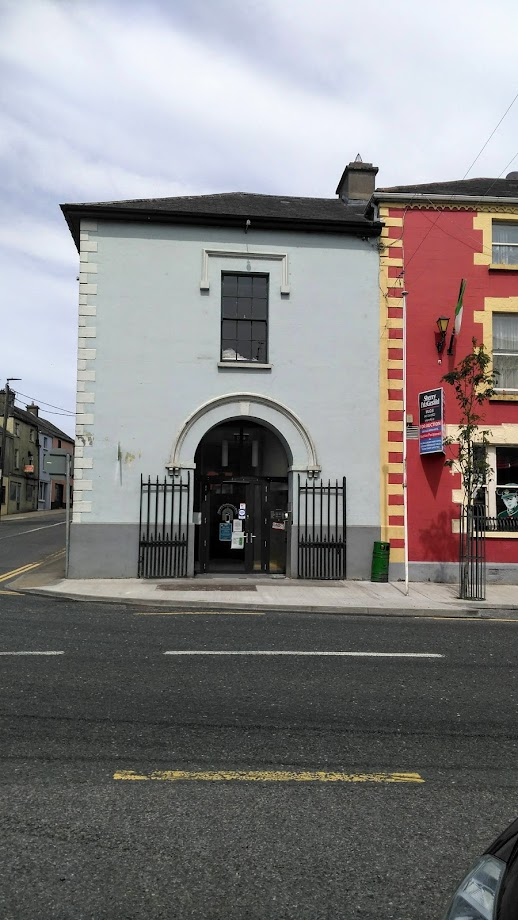
Market House, corner of Main Street and Market Street (now branch library)

Granard was the location of an annual Harp festival from 1781 to 1785. This had been due to the financial support of James Dungan, an Irish merchant then residing in Copenhagen, and a native of Granard, who had heard of similar events being organised in Scotland. Many of the harpists who won prizes at these festivals, including Charles Fanning, Arthur O'Neill, and Rose Mooney went on to perform at the Belfast Harp Festival in July 1792. There has been a revival of the festival since 1981.

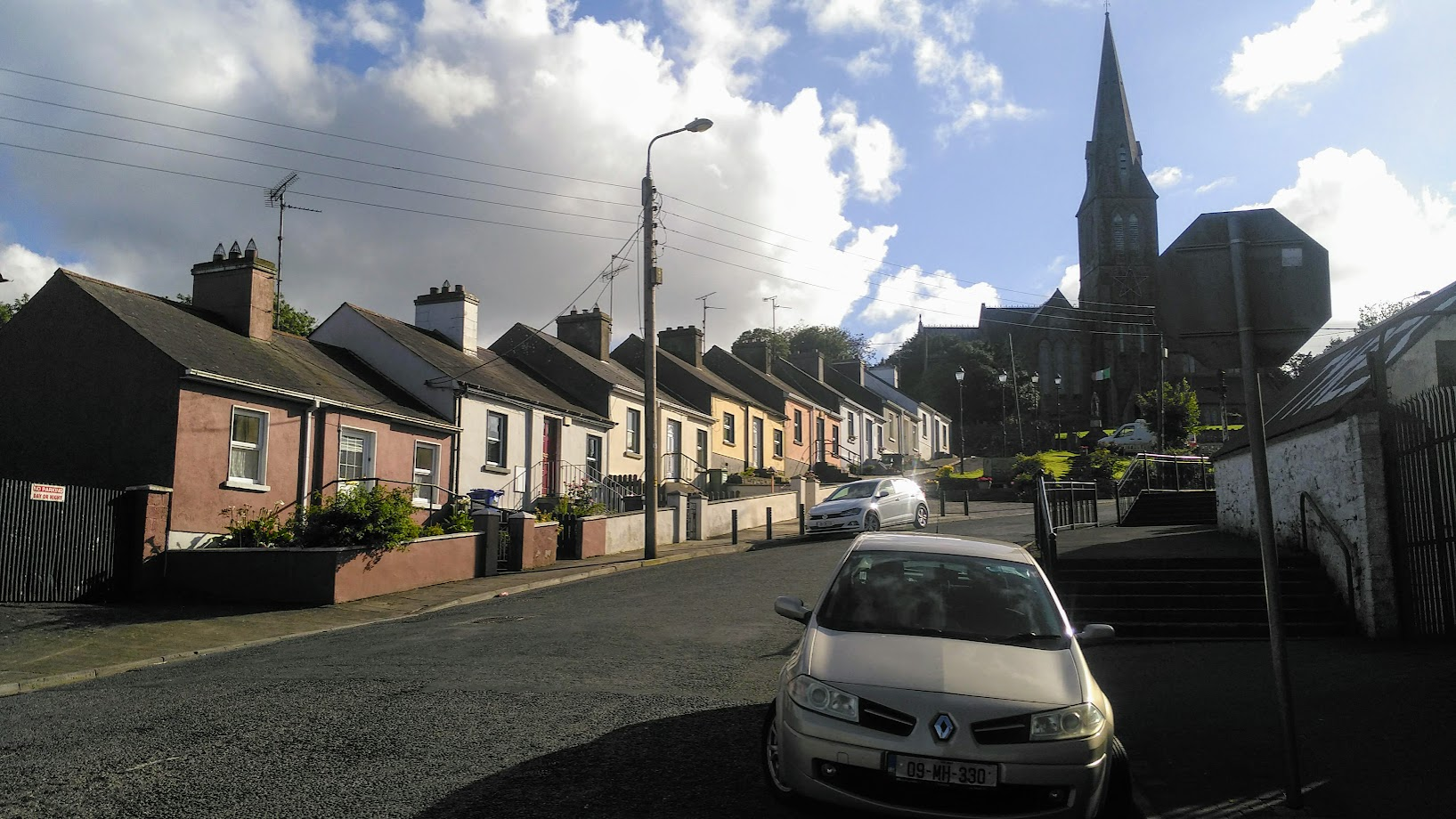
Church Street, Granard with St. Mary's Church (Roman Catholic) at top

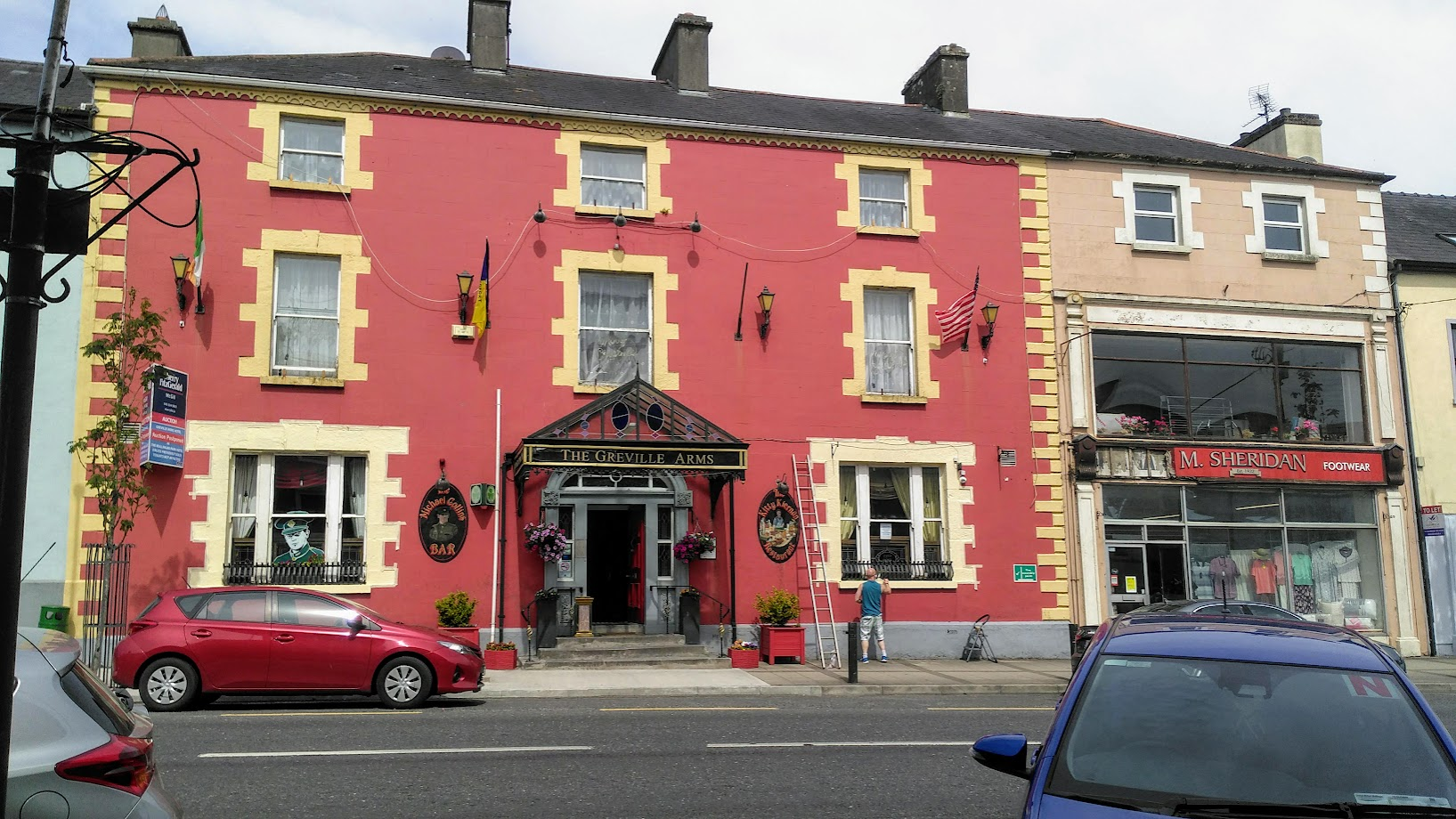
Greville Arms Hotel, Main Street, formerly the home of Kitty Kiernan

During the Irish War of Independence, on 31 October 1920 a police officer, District-Inspector Philip Kelleher was shot dead by two masked men in the bar of the Greville Arms Hotel, Granard. As a reprisal, a motor convoy of Crown forces entered the village four days later and systematically destroyed some of the main business premises of the town.

Historical population
Year	Pop.	±%
1813	2,425	—
1821	2,534	+4.5%
1831	2,069	−18.4%
1841	2,408	+16.4%
1851	1,805	−25.0%
1861	1,671	−7.4%
1871	1,811	+8.4%
1881	1,828	+0.9%
1891	1,834	+0.3%
1901	1,622	−11.6%
1911	1,531	−5.6%
1926	1,269	−17.1%
1936	1,236	−2.6%
1946	1,197	−3.2%
1951	1,150	−3.9%
1956	1,086	−5.6%
1961	1,044	−3.9%
1966	1,045	+0.1%
1971	1,054	+0.9%
1981	1,285	+21.9%
1986	1,338	+4.1%
1991	1,221	−8.7%
1996	1,173	−3.9%
2002	1,013	−13.6%
2006	933	−7.9%
2011	1,021	+9.4%
2016	816	−20.1%
2022	1,058	+29.7%

== Administration ==
In 1899, Granard became an urban district under the Local Government (Ireland) Act 1898. The urban district council was downgraded to a town commissioners in the early years of the Irish Free State. In 2002, it became Granard Town Council.

In 2014, this local government body was abolished. Since then, the town has fallen within the responsibility of Longford County Council. Granard Municipal District is represented by five elected councillors.

== Transport ==
Granard is within the catchment area for Edgeworthstown railway station. The station is about a fifteen-minute drive; there is no bus link.

Bus Éireann Expressway route 65 provides one service a day to Monaghan (with onward connections to Belfast) and one service a day to Athlone (with onward connections to Galway). On Fridays there is a second service each way. Bus Éireann local route 111A between Cavan and Athboy (with onward connections to Trim and Dublin) serves Granard and operates four times a day each way, thrice each way on Saturdays and once each way on Sundays.

Donnelly's Pioneer Bus Service, a local bus company based in Granard, operate a Local Link route from Granard to Longford via Ballinalee. There are several journeys each way, with no Sunday service.

== Notable people ==
- Thomas Henry "Tommy" Bond (1856–1941), a pitcher and right fielder in Major League Baseball, was a native of Granard and the first Irish-born person to play Major League Baseball.
- Larry Cunningham (1938–2012), from nearby Clooneen, Mullinalaghta, was an Irish country music singer and the first Irish showband artist to break into the British charts with "Tribute to Jim Reeves" in 1964.
- Kitty Kiernan (1892–1945), who was born in Granard, was engaged to Irish revolutionary Michael Collins.
- Ann Lovett (1968–1984), a fifteen-year-old schoolgirl who died giving birth beside a grotto in 1984.
- Eddie Macken (b.1949), international show jumper, was born and lived in Granard.
- James O'Brien (1806–1882), High Court judge, was born in Granard.
- Brendan O'Reilly (1929–2001), Irish broadcaster and athlete.
- James Bronterre O'Brien, leader of the Chartist Movement.

== See also ==
- List of towns and villages in Ireland
- Market Houses in Ireland
