= Joseph Mangan =

American aerospace engineer

Joseph Mangan is an American aerospace engineer who, in 2004, was threatened with prison after telling European aviation authorities of his belief that the microprocessors controlling cabin pressurization valves in the new Airbus A380 might allow a sudden depressurization of the passenger cabin in flight—which, at normal cruising altitudes, could endanger the lives of people aboard the aircraft. A sudden loss of pressure at high altitudes can produce unconsciousness within seconds, followed eventually by death.

According to the European Aeronautic Defence and Space Company, all parties have ensured through the most varied control channels that there is no safety deficit with regard to the scenario, as described by Mangan in the final certificated aircraft. All corresponding documents were reviewed and approved by European Aviation Safety Agency (EASA) and US Federal Aviation Administration (FAA). The review process, incorporating the participation of Joseph Mangan, successfully finished in late 2006 when the Airbus A380 including the internal communication system and the microprocessors of the cabin pressure control system was certified by EASA and FAA.

Mangan's story is one of those featured in a 2007 French Documentary entitled Du côté des "anges" which translates to On the side of the "Angels" by Mattieu Verboud, which is about employees who break "the law of silence" to denounce acts of corruption or negligence in their companies.
