= Turlough O'Carolan =

Irish composer and musician (1670–1738)

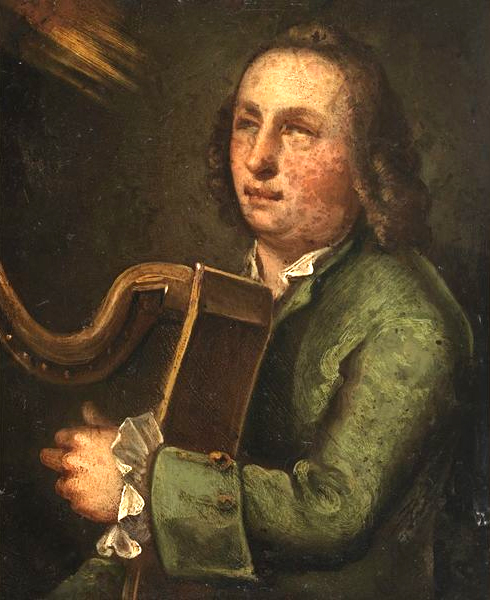
- Born: 1670; Nobber, Ireland
- Died: 25 March 1738 (aged 67–68)

Turlough O'Carolan (Note: According to the 5th edition of Grove's Dictionary of Music and Musicians, the version O'Carolan is "modern and lacks authority".) (Irish: Toirdhealbhach Ó Cearbhalláin [ˈt̪ˠɾˠeːl̪ˠəx oː ˈcaɾˠwəl̪ˠaːnʲ, - ˈcaɾˠuːl̪ˠaːnʲ]; 1670 – 25 March 1738) was a blind Celtic harper, composer and singer in Ireland whose great fame is due to his gift for melodic composition.

Although not a composer in the classical sense, Carolan is considered by some to be Ireland's national composer. Harpers in the old Irish tradition were still living as late as 1792, and ten, including Arthur O'Neill, Patrick Quin and Donnchadh Ó hÁmsaigh, attended the Belfast Harp Festival. Ó hÁmsaigh played some of Carolan's music, but disliked it for being too modern. Some of Carolan's own compositions show influences of the style of continental classical music, whereas others such as Farewell to Music reflect a much older style of "Gaelic Harping".

== Biography ==
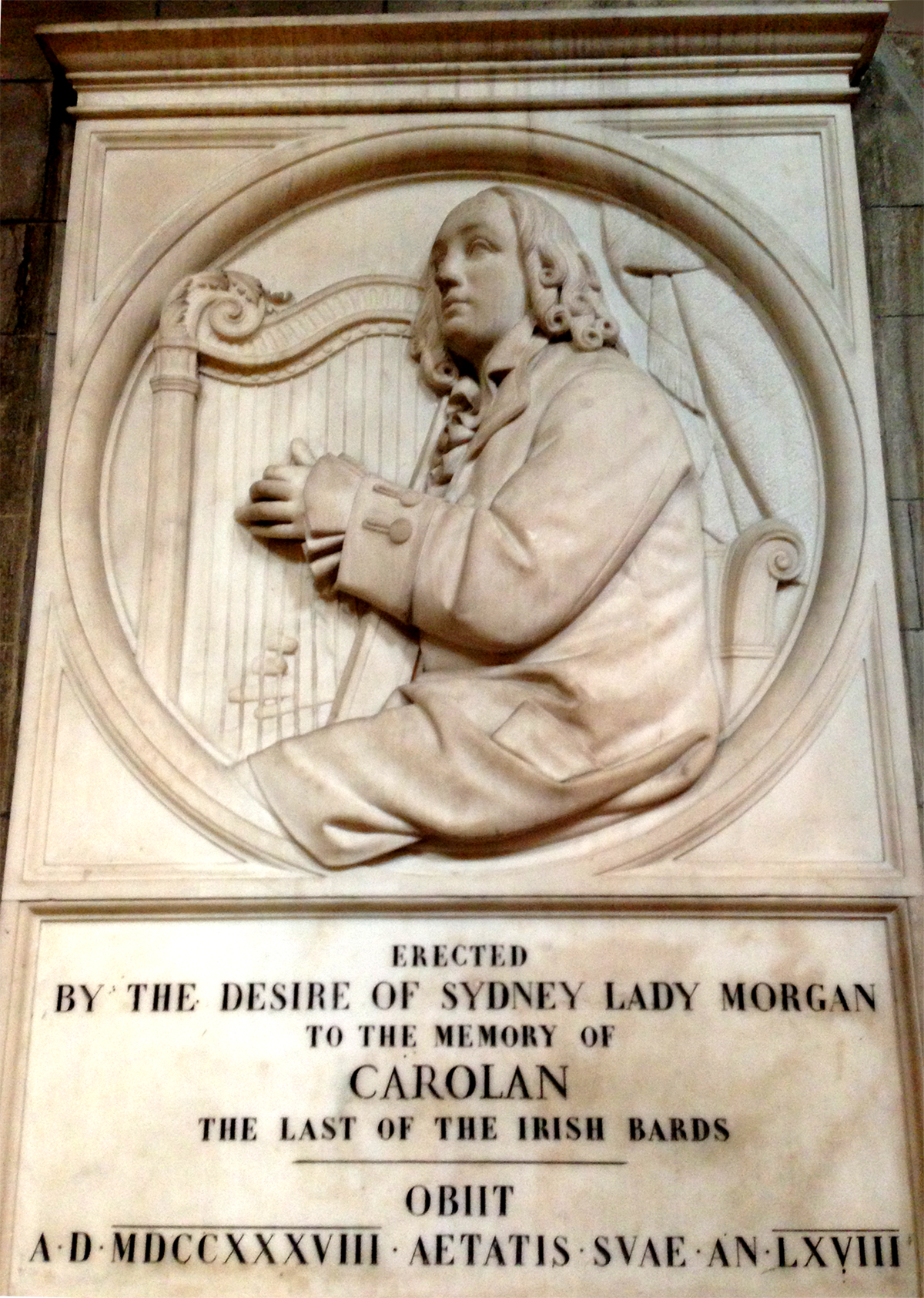
Carolan's memorial in St Patrick's Cathedral was the gift of Sydney, Lady Morgan.

Carolan was born in 1670 in Nobber, County Meath, where his father was a blacksmith. The family, who were said to be a branch of the Mac Brádaigh sept of County Cavan (Carolan's great-grandfather, Shane Grana O'Carrolan, was chieftain of his sept in 1607), forfeited their estates during the civil wars and moved from Meath in 1684 to Ballyfarnon, County Roscommon, on the invitation of the family of MacDermot Roe of Alderford House. In Roscommon, his father took a job with the MacDermott Roe family. Mrs. MacDermott Roe gave Turlough an education, and he showed talent in poetry. After being blinded by smallpox at the age of eighteen, Carolan was apprenticed by Mrs. MacDermott Roe to a good harper. At the age of twenty-one, being given a horse and a guide, he set out to travel Ireland and compose songs for patrons.

For almost fifty years, Carolan journeyed from one end of Ireland to the other, composing and performing his tunes. One of his earliest compositions was about Brigid Cruise, with whom he was infatuated. Brigid was the teenage daughter of the schoolmaster at the school for the blind attended by Carolan in Cruisetown, Ireland. In 1720, Carolan married Mary Maguire. He was then 50 years of age. Their first family home was a cottage on a parcel of land near the town of Manachain (now Mohill) in County Leitrim, where they settled. They had seven children, six daughters and one son. In 1733 Mary died.

Turlough O'Carolan died on 25 March 1738. He is buried in the MacDermott Roe family crypt in Kilronan Burial Ground near Ballyfarnon, County Roscommon. The annual O'Carolan Harp Festival and Summer School commemorates his life and work in Keadue, County Roscommon.

A bronze monument by sculptor Oisín Kelly depicting Turlough O'Carolan playing his harp was erected on a plinth at the Market Square, Mohill, on 10 August 1986, and was unveiled by Patrick Hillery, President of Ireland.

A statue was erected for him in 2002 at his place of birth, during the Annual O'Carolan Harp Festival, the first of which was held in Nobber in 1988.

== Music and style ==
Carolan composed both songs and instrumental harp music, reflecting various styles of composition. About a third of Carolan's surviving music has associated Irish lyrics that survive to this day. These lyrics are largely unknown to the musicians of today, who have for the most part adapted Carolan's repertoire to the currently popular Irish fare of jigs and reels.

Modern Irish was the majority language in Ireland during Carolan's time. As Carolan did not speak English very well, he composed only one song in English, "Carolan's Devotion". These lyrics can be heard on the album "Carolan's Harp", by The Harp Consort, 1996. Most of Carolan's songs were dedicated to and written about specific individual patrons. Many of his tunes are widely performed and appreciated today, and a handful of the songs with known lyrics have been recorded by singers. Among these are Gráinne Yeats (Belfast Harp Festival, 1992) and the singers of Garlic Bread ("O'Carolan's Dream", 2007) and Ensemble Musica Humana ("Turlough O'Carolan: a Life in Song", 2013).

Carolan's activities during his career are only partially documented historically. This has led to a lack of accurate information about Carolan and his music, even among Irish musicians. Sometimes, alternate titles or incorrect titles have been applied to songs, creating confusion as to whether the song is Carolan's or someone else's. Also, some of those who have written about Carolan and his music have made up facts or repeated unfounded stories. For instance, Edward Bunting, who began the work of collecting Carolan's pieces, referred to a "very ancient air" the Fairy Queen, saying it "seems to have been the original of Carolan's Fairy Queen." He also reported that "the Fairy Queen of Carolan was not intended by him for words, but as a piece of music for the harp." While it is true that Carolan did not write the traditional Fairy Queen words, which indeed do exist, the words are not ancient (nor is the entirely different traditional Irish air The Fairy Queen), and the words do in fact fit perfectly the original music which Carolan composed for them.

Carolan is said to have typically composed the tune first, as he rode from place to place, then added words later. Many of his songs are designated as "planxties", an obscure word that Carolan apparently invented or popularized to signify a tribute to a merry host. In return for writing songs in honour of wealthy patrons, Carolan was often welcomed as an honoured guest to stay on their estates. It is said that weddings and funerals were sometimes delayed until he could arrive to perform.

== Publication ==
Most of Carolan's compositions were not published or even written down in his lifetime. They survived in the repertoires of fiddlers, pipers, and the last of the old Irish harper/singers. They were collected and published during the late 18th century and beyond, largely beginning with the work of Edward Bunting and his assistants in 1792.

A small sampling of Carolan's music was published during his lifetime. One of the first such publications was in Neale's A Collection of the Most Celebrated Irish Tunes ..., Dublin, 1724.

The definitive work containing all 214 of Carolan's tunes as identified by Donal O'Sullivan (1893–1973) is the 1958 edition (2001 reprint) of Carolan: The Life Times and Music of an Irish Harper. Partial lyrics (and all known sources of lyrics) are mentioned in the text description of each piece but are not matched to the written music. O'Sullivan does not include any of the handful of alleged Carolan songs that he considers to be erroneous, such as: "Dermott O'Doud", "Planxty Miss Burke", and "The Snowy-Breasted Pearl".

A comprehensive edition of Carolan's Songs & Airs containing new arrangements for harp of all 214 airs, along with an additional 12 airs from the Appendix of the 2001 edition was published by Caitríona Rowsome in 2011. This book includes an instance of each of Carolan's undisputed surviving lyrics and metrically sets the lyrics note-for-note to the sheet music airs. Each of the 226 harp settings in this book are played by the author on a neo-Irish harp (book and 4-CD set). This is the first time that all of Carolan's lyrics have been set to the airs and has been welcomed as "a task that has needed doing for many years". The 4-CD recording is of harp music without vocals, but the book includes sheet music for interested singers. The book also includes an English interpretation of each of Carolan's 72 Irish song lyrics. Five of these interpretations take the form of new English lyrics set metrically to the sheet music of "Hewlett", "Colonel John Irwin", "John O'Connor", "Kean O'Hara (3rd Air)" and "Sheebeg and Sheemore".

== Performances ==
Since 1967, when Seán O'Riada and the Ceoltóirí Chualann released Carolan's Concerto and 2 other Carolan compositions, there have been hundreds of recordings of Carolan songs released by dozens of artists. Many of these recordings are by such well-known performers as The Chieftains, Planxty, Clannad and Patrick Ball, and many others by less well-known artists. Occasionally, an artist who is popular in another area will record a single Carolan song for the sake of variety, such as Steeleye Span's "Sheebeg and Sheemore", John Renbourn's "Lament for Owen Roe O'Neill", Richard Thompson's "Morgan Mawgan" [sic], Stefan Grossman's "Blind Mary", John Williams' "Mrs. Maxwell", and many others. Several popular collections by multiple artists have also been issued, including The Music of O'Carolan (1993), Deluxe Anthology of Carolan (1995), Celtic Treasure (1996), and Celtic Treasure II (2001). The sheer quantity of these recordings has greatly expanded the number of Carolan pieces known to the public, but the performers do tend to come back to certain songs again and again. Among the most frequently recorded pieces are the following:

"Carolan's Concerto" (at least 36), "Blind Mary" (at least 23), "Planxty George Brabazon" (also known as "Isle of Skye"; at least 23), "Sheebeg and Sheemore" (at least 23), "Planxty Col. Irwin" (at least 19), "Fanny Power" (at least 19), "Eleanor Plunkett" (at least 18), "The Princess Royal" (also known as "Miss MacDermott" and "The Arethusa"; at least 18), "Carolan's Farewell to Music" (at least 18), "Carolan's Draught" (at least 17), "Hewlett" (at least 16), and "Stafford's Receipt" (at least 16). In addition, innumerable musicians have performed many of Carolan's tunes learned from such books as The Fiddler's Fakebook, which contains some of the above tunes plus Morgan Magan and Planxty Drury. Also, O'Neill's Music of Ireland (1903) is still in print and contains over 60 of Carolan's tunes, of which far too many to list have made their way into the repertoire of musicians around the world.

In addition, Carolan's Concerto has been used as a neutral slow march by the Foot Guards of the British Army during the ceremony of Trooping the Colour. Also, some of Carolan's compositions have appeared in the role-playing game FATE, specifically Captain O'Kane and The Clergy's Lamentation.

Carolan's music has frequently been adapted for fingerstyle guitar (primarily steel-string acoustic), often by altering the tuning from standard (EADGBE) to DADGBE (drop D), DADGAD, and CGDGAD, among others. This allows strings to ring out and results in a more harp-like sound. Duck Baker has recorded many Carolan songs in drop D tuning. El McMeen performs almost exclusively in CGDGAD and has recorded many Carolan songs.

== Compositions ==
The complete list of the 214 Carolan compositions identified by Donal O'Sullivan (see References) are, in alphabetical order, as follows:

- All Alive
- Baptist Johnston
- Betty MacNeill
- Betty O'Brien
- Blind Mary
- Brian Maguire
- Bridget Cruise, 1st Air
- Bridget Cruise, 2nd Air
- Bridget Cruise, 3rd Air
- Bridget Cruise, 4th Air
- Bumper Squire Jones
- Captain Higgins
- Captain Magan
- Captain O'Kane
- Captain O'Neill, (no. 214)
- Captain Sudley (Carolan's Dowry)
- Carolan's Cap
- Carolan's Cottage
- Carolan's Cup
- Carolan's Draught
- Carolan's Dream
- Carolan's Farewell to Music
- Carolan's Frolic
- Carolan's Maggot
- Carolan's Quarrel with the Landlady
- Carolan's Ramble to Cashel
- Carolan's Welcome, (no. 171)
- Catherine Martin
- Catherine O'More
- Charles O'Conor
- The Clergy's Lamentation
- Colonel Irwin
- Colonel Manus O'Donnell
- Colonel O'Hara
- Conor O'Reilly
- Constantine Maguire
- Counsellor Dillon
- Cremonea
- Daniel Kelly
- The Dark, Plaintive Youth
- David Power
- Denis O'Conor, 1st Air
- Denis O'Conor, 2nd Air
- Dolly MacDonough (The Morning Star)
- Donal O'Brien
- Dr. John Hart
- Dr. John Stafford (Stafford's Receipt)
- Dr. MacMahon, Bishop of Clogher
- Dr. Delany
- Dr. John Hart, Bishop of Achonry
- Dr. O'Connor
- Edmond MacDermott Roe
- Edward Corcoran
- Edward Dodwell
- Eleanor Plunkett
- The Elevation
- Elizabeth MacDermott Roe
- Elizabeth Nugent
- The Fairy Queen
- Fanny Dillon
- Fanny Power (Fanny Poer)
- Father Brian MacDermott Roe
- Frank Palmer
- General Wynne
- George Brabazon, 1st Air
- ("Planxty") George Brabazon, 2nd Air
- George Reynolds
- Gerald Dillon
- Grace Nugent
- Henry MacDermott Roe, 1st Air
- Henry MacDermott Roe, 2nd Air
- Henry MacDermott Roe, 3rd Air
- The Honourable Thomas Burke
- Hugh Kelly
- Hugh O'Donnell
- Isabella Burke
- James Betagh
- James Crofton
- James Daly
- James Plunkett
- John Drury, 1st Air
- John Drury, 2nd Air
- John Jameson
- John Jones
- John Kelly
- John MacDermott
- John Moore
- John Nugent
- John O'Connor
- John O'Reilly, 1st Air
- John O'Reilly, 2nd Air
- John Peyton
- Katherine O'More (The Hawk of the Erne)
- Kean O'Hara, 1st Air (O'Hara's Cup)
- Kean O'Hara, 2nd Air
- Kean O'Hara, 3rd Air
- Kitty Magennis
- Lady Athenry
- Lady Blaney
- Lady Dillon
- Lady Gethin
- Lady Laetitia Burke
- Lady St. John
- Lady Wrixon
- Lament for Charles MacCabe
- Lament for Owen O'Rourke
- Lament for Owen Roe O'Neill
- Lament for Sir Ulick Burke
- Lament for Terence MacDonough
- The Landlady
- Loftus Jones
- Lord Dillon
- Lord Galway's Lamentation
- Lord Inchiquin
- Lord Louth
- Lord Massereene
- Lord Mayo
- Luke Dillon
- Mabel Kelly
- Major Shanly
- Margaret Malone
- Mary O'Neill
- Maurice O'Connor, 1st Air
- Maurice O'Connor, 2nd Air
- Maurice O'Connor, 3rd Air
- Mervyn Pratt
- Michael O'Connor, 1st Air
- Michael O'Connor, 2nd Air
- Miss Crofton
- Miss Fetherston (Carolan's Devotion)
- Miss Goulding
- Miss MacDermott (The Princess Royal)
- Miss MacMurray
- Miss Murphy
- Miss Noble
- Morgan Magan
- Mr. Malone
- Mr. O'Connor
- Mr. Waller
- Mrs. Anne MacDermott Roe
- Mrs. Bermingham, 1st Air
- Mrs. Bermingham, 2nd Air
- Mrs. Cole
- Mrs. Costello
- Mrs. Crofton
- Mrs. Delany
- Mrs. Edwards
- Mrs. Fallon
- Mrs. Farrell
- Mrs. Garvey, 1st Air
- Mrs. Garvey, 2nd Air
- Mrs. Harwood
- Mrs. Judge
- Mrs. Keel
- Mrs. MacDermott Roe
- Mrs. Maxwell, 1st Air
- Mrs. Maxwell, 2nd Air
- Mrs. Nugent
- Mrs. O'Connor
- Mrs. O'Conor
- Mrs. O'Neill of Carlane
- Mrs. O'Neill (Carolan's Favourite)
- Mrs. O'Rourke
- Mrs. Power (Carolan's Concerto)
- Mrs. Sterling
- Mrs. Waller
- Nancy Cooper, 1st Air
- Nancy Cooper, 2nd Air
- O'Flinn
- O'Reilly of Athcarne
- The O'Rourkes' Feast
- Ode to Whiskey
- One Bottle More
- Owen O'Rourke
- Patrick Kelly
- Peggy Morton
- Planxty Browne, (no. 180)
- Planxty Burke
- Planxty Crilly
- Planxty Drew
- Planxty Hewlett
- Planxty John Irwin
- Planxty Kelly
- Planxty O'Rourke, 1st Air
- Planxty O'Rourke, 2nd Air
- Planxty Plunkett
- Planxty Sweeney
- Planxty Wilkinson
- Richard Cusack
- Robert Hawkes
- Robert Jordan
- The Seas are Deep
- Separation of Soul and Body
- Sheebeg and Sheemore
- Sir Arthur Shaen
- Sir Charles Coote
- Sir Edward Crofton
- Sir Festus Burke
- Sir Ulick Burke
- Squire Parsons
- Squire Wood's Lamentation on the Refusal of his Halfpence
- Susanna Kelly
- Thomas Burke
- Thomas Judge (Carolan's Frolic)
- Tobias Peyton
- The Two William Davises
- (unnamed) - 8 pieces, (nos. 172-179)
- Variations on the Scottish Air
  "Cock Up Your Beaver"
- Variations on the Scottish Air
  "When She Cam Ben"
- William Eccles
- William Ward

Many of these pieces have alternative titles, as fully documented by Donal O'Sullivan. O'Sullivan's preferred titles are the ones generally accepted as standard, though quite a few of these titles were devised by O'Sullivan himself after exhaustive research into the identities of the patrons for whom each song was written.

Additionally, a manuscript compiled in Scotland in 1816 by the MacLean-Clephane sisters was discovered in 1983 and includes at least five other pieces credited to Carolan and other annotated pieces that were "improved by Carolan" or "consistent with Carolan's writing to warrant consideration". These airs are included in the Appendix of the 2001 edition of Carolan: The Life Times and Music of an Irish Harper along with detailed research notes. These pieces came to light a decade after the death of Donal O'Sullivan in 1973, so he never had an opportunity to subject them to the same analysis that he used on the original 214 airs that he originally compiled in 1958. However, to date, no one has disputed the attributions presented in this manuscript. Newly composed harp arrangements for each of these and all the other airs (as well as new Carolan repertoire numbers 215 to 226 for each of the MacLean-Clephane tunes) are included in The Complete Carolan Songs & Airs by Caitríona Rowsome. The five pieces that are said to be composed by Carolan rather than simply "improved" are:

- "Athlone" (215)
- "Banks of the Shannon" (216)
- "Farewell to Lough Neaghe" (219)
- "Irish Galloway Tom" (220)
- "The Lamentation of Ireland" (221)

== Other ==
- O'Carolan Road in the Tenters area of Dublin 8 is named in his honour.
- Carolan Road and "Carolan Corner" shop are named in his honour in the Ballynafeigh area of south Belfast.
- The meteorite crater Carolan on Mercury was named in his honour in 2015.
- Polish bands: 2 plus 1 in 1979 and Myslovitz in 1996 recorded songs entitled "Peggy Brown", said to be a translation of an obscure O'Carolan lyric by Polish lyricist Ernest Bryll, with different tunes and arrangements: folk and alternative rock, respectively. Neither of these tunes uses an O'Carolan composition. Both songs were very popular in Poland.
- O'Carolan is depicted on the £50 note, Series B Banknote of Ireland.

== See also ==
- List of people on the postage stamps of Ireland
- Music of Ireland

== Bibliography ==
- Laurence Whyte: "A Dissertation on Italian and Irish Musick, with Some Panegyrick on Carrallan Our Late Irish Orpheus", in Poems on Various Subjects (Dublin, 1740).
- Oliver Goldsmith: "The History of Carolan, the Last Irish Harper", in The British Magazine, or Monthly Repository for Gentlemen and Ladies, vol. 1 no. 7 (July 1760), pp. 418–419.
- Joseph Cooper Walker: Historical Memoirs of the Irish Bards (Dublin, 1786).
- (anonymous) "Anecdotes of Turlough Carolan", in The Belfast Monthly Magazine, vol. 3 no. 12 (1809), pp. 42–46.
- Luke Donnellan: "Carolaniana", in Journal of the County Louth Archaeological Society, vol. 2 no. 1 (1908), p. 62–71.
- Tomás Ó Máille (ed.): Amhráin Chearbhalláin/The Poems of Carolan: Together with Other N. Connacht and S. Ulster Lyrics (London, 1916).
- Donal O'Sullivan: Carolan: The Life Times and Music of an Irish Harper, 2 volumes (London: Routledge and Kegan Paul, 1958); new edition in 1 volume: Cork: Ossian Publications, 2001; ISBN 1-900428-76-8 (hardback), 1-900428-71-7 (paperback).
- Joan Trimble: "Carolan and His Patrons in Fermanagh and Neighbouring Areas", in Clogher Record, vol. 10 no. 1 (1979), pp. 26–50.
- Gráinne Yeats: "Lost Chords", in: Ceol, vol. 7 no. 1–2 (1984), pp. 14–19.
- The Complete Works of O'Carolan: Irish Harper & Composer (1670–1738), edition of the music, reprinted from O'Sullivan (1958) (Cork: Ossian Publications, 1984), ISBN 0 946005 16 8.
- Joan Rimmer: "Patronage, Style and Structure in the Music Attributed to Turlough Carolan", in Early Music, vol. 15 no. 2 (1987), pp. 164–174.
- Harry White: "Carolan and the Dislocation of Music in Ireland", in: Eighteenth-Century Ireland, vol. 4 (1989), pp. 55–64.
- Joan Rimmer: "Harp Repertoire in Eighteenth-Century Ireland: Perceptions, Misconceptions and Reworkings", in Martin van Scheik (ed.): Aspects of the Historical Harp. Proceedings of the International Historical Harps Symposium, Utrecht 1992 (Utrecht: STIMU Foundation for Historical Performance Practice, 1994), pp. 73–85.
- Sandra Joyce: "An Introduction to O'Carolan's Music in Eighteenth-Century Printed Collections", in Patrick Devine and Harry White (eds), The Maynooth International Musicological Conference, 1995: Selected Proceedings, Part 1 (= Irish Musical Studies, vol. 4) (Dublin: Four Courts Press, 1996), pp. 296–309.
- Art Edelstein: Fair Melodies: Turlough Carolan, An Irish Harper (East Calais, Vermont: Noble Stone Press, 2001), ISBN 978-0971169302.
- Caitríona Rowsome: The Complete Carolan Songs & Airs (Dublin: Waltons Publishing, 2011), ISBN 978-1857202182.
- Sandra Joyce: "Carolan, Turlough [Toirdhealbhach Ó Cearbhalláin]", in: Harry White & Barra Boydell (eds), The Encyclopaedia of Music in Ireland (Dublin: University College Dublin Press, 2013), pp. 162–164.
