= Edward Walsh (poet) =

Irish poet (1805–1850)

Edward Walsh (1805 – 6 August 1850) was an Irish poet, the son of a sergeant in the Cork Militia, and was born in Derry City, where his father's regiment had been sent for training. His parents were natives in the village of Millstreet, County Cork, near which his father at one time possessed a small holding.

Walsh spent about thirty years of his life in Millstreet. His education was received in that most primitive of Irish primary schools, the ‘hedge school’—so called because the children assembled under a spreading hedge on summer days to be taught by untrained teachers who, wandering from district to district, thus obtained a miserable livelihood.

When little more than a boy he showed great intellectual gifts, and in 1830 was private tutor in County Cork. Additionally tutored children of an Irish member of parliament. He was for a time teacher of a school at Millstreet, whence, in 1837, he removed to Tourin, County Waterford, having been appointed to a school under the Commissioners of Education.

Many of his songs and poems appeared between the years 1832–39, and he contributed to the Nation. In an uncongenial occupation, and pestered by officials, he went to reside in Dublin in 1843, and was befriended by Charles Gavan Duffy, who got him appointed sub-editor of the Monitor. His Irish Jacobite Poetry (1844) and his Irish Popular Songs (1847) gave unmistakable evidence of a genuine poet. Yet he was forced to fight against poverty, and, in 1848, he accepted the post of schoolmaster to the junior convicts of Spike Island.

There he was visited by John Mitchel, on his way to penal servitude, who vividly describes in his Jail Journal his meeting with Walsh. Not long afterwards, he secured the schoolmastership of Cork work-house, but died within twelve months. A fine monument, with an epitaph in Irish and English, was erected to his memory in the Father Mathew Cemetery at Cork. Among his lyrics Mo Chragibhin Cno, Brighidin ban mo stor, and O'Donovan's Daughter are in most Irish anthologies, while his translations from the Irish are both faithful and musical.

== Criticism ==
Hayes says in his Ballads of Ireland: "There is a singular beauty and fascinating melody in his verse, which cheers and charms the ear and heart. His translations preserve all the peculiarities of the old tongue, which he knew and spoke with graceful fluency. His ballads are the most literal and characteristic which we possess."

== Selected poem ==
- Have You Been at Carrick? In Padraic Colum (1922). Anthology of Irish Verse. Boni and Liveright.
