= Lurgan, County Cavan =

Lurgan An Lorgain
- Civil Parish
- Location in Ireland
- Country: Ireland
- Province: Ulster
- County: County Cavan

Lurgan is a civil parish and electoral division in County Cavan, Ireland. Lurgan is also part of the historical barony of Castlerahan. The Catholic parish of Lurgan is also sometimes called Virginia, after the largest town in the parish and surrounding area.

== Population ==
In the 1837, the parish had a population of 6387 and an area of 11328 statute acres.

In 2011, the Electoral Division of Lurgan has a population of 565 and an area of 14.46 square kilometers.
