= Donnchadh Ó hAmhsaigh =

Irish harper (c. 1695–1807)

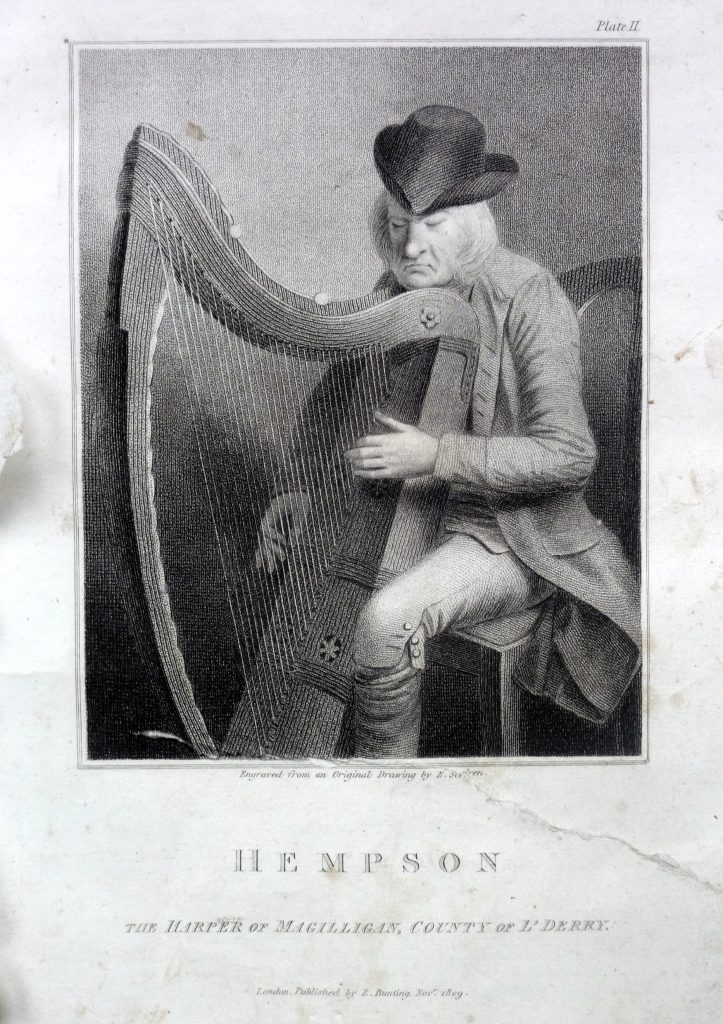
- From Edward Bunting, A General Collection of the Ancient Music of Ireland (1809)
- Born: c. 1695; Craigmore, County Londonderry
- Died: 5 or 11 November 1807; Magilligan, Derry
- Resting place: St. Aidan's Church, Magilligan
- Other names: Denis Hempsey, Denis Hempson, Denis Hampson
- Occupation: Harpist
- Spouse: Nanny Dougherty

Donnchadh Ó hAmhsaigh, known in English as Denis Hampsey, Denis Hampson or Denis Hempson (1695 – 5 or 11 November 1807), was an Irish harper.

== Early life and background ==
Ó hAmhsaigh was born in Craigmore, County Londonderry, in 1695. Both his parents were from the area around Magilligan, County Londonderry, where his father, Brian Darrogher Ó hAmhsaigh "held the whole town-land of Tyrcrevan; his mother's relations were in possession of the wood-town (both considerable farms in Magilligan)". He was raised here and it was also where his musical education began.

== Musical career ==
Ó hAmhsaigh began to play for himself at the age of eighteen (i.e., in 1713), his first patron being Counsellor Canning of Garvagh, with whom he stayed for half a year. With Squire Gage and Doctor Bacon, Counsellor Canning found and purchased a harp for him, what is now known as The Downhill Harp. He spent the next decade travelling and playing both in Ireland and Scotland. His second journey to Scotland coincided with the 1745 Rebellion:

In his second trip to Scotland, in the year 1745, being at Edinburgh, when Charley the Pretender was there, he was called into the great hall to play; at first he was alone, afterwards four fiddlers joined: the tune called for was, "The king shall enjoy his own again:" – he sung here part of the words following –

"I hope to see the day When the Whigs shall run away, And the king shall enjoy his own again."

'I asked him if he heard the Pretender speak; he replied – I only heard him ask, "Is Sylvan there;" on which some one answered, "He is not here please your royal highness, but he shall be sent for." He meant to say Sullivan, continued Hampson, but that was the way he called the name. He says that Captain McDonnell, when in Ireland, came to see him, and that he told the captain that Charley's cockade was in his father's house.

'Hampson was brought into the Pretender's presence by Colonel Kelly, of Roscommon, and Sir Thomas Sheridan, and that he (Hampson) was then above fifty years old."

== His music and harp ==
According to the Rev. George Vaughan Sampson, who collected his memoirs in 1805, 'his favourites' included 'Coolin', 'The Dawning of the Day', 'Ellen a Roon', and 'Cean Dubh Dilis'.

O'Hampsey played some of Carolan's music but disliked it for being too modern. He was a great admirer of Carolan's contemporary Cornelius Lyons (c. 1680 – c. 1750) and played a number of fine baroque-style variation sets by Lyons.

Rev. G. V. Sampson wrote that

"he played at the famous meeting of harpers at Belfast, under the patronage of some amateurs of Irish music. Mr Bunton, the celebrated musician of that town, was here the year before, at Hampson's, noting his tunes and his manner of playing, which is in the best old style. He said, with the honest feeling of self love, "When I played the old tunes, not another of the harpers would play after me."

His harp, which has since become known as the Downhill Harp, was originally owned by a Cormac O Kelly of Ballinascreen (Draperstown) who built it in 1702. It bears the name 'C O Devlin', perhaps the name of its original owner. After Ó hAmhsaigh's death it was taken to the house of his last patron, Rev. Hervey Bruce of Downhill House. From there it acquired its current name 'The Downhill Harp'. It was not at Downhill when the house burned, eventually coming up for auction in the 1960s, at which point it was purchased by the Guinness company. It is now on display in their Storehouse museum in Dublin.

It bears the following inscription:

[IN THE] TIME OF NOAH I WAS GREEN

[SINCE] HIS FLOOD I HAVE NOT BEEN SEEN

UNTIL 17 HUNDRED AND 02 I WAS FOUND BY CR KELLY UNDER GROUND

HE RAISED ME UP TO THAT DEGREE QUEEN OF MUSICK YU MAY CALL ME

== Later life ==
Ó hAmhsaigh returned to Magilligan late in life, and

"at the age of eighty-six, married a woman of Inishowen, whom he found living in the house of an old friend. "I can't tell," quoth Hampson, "if it was not the devil buckled us together, she being lame and I blind." By this wife he has one daughter [aged 33 in 1805], married to a cooper, who has several children, and maintains them all, though Hampson (in this alone seeming to doat), says, that his son-in-law is a spendthrift and that he maintains them; the family humour his whim, and the old man is quieted. He is pleased when they tell him, as he thinks is the case, that several people of character, for musical taste, send letters to invite him; and he, though incapable now of leaving the house, is planning expeditions never to be attempted, much less realized; these are the only traces of mental debility; as to his body, he has no inconvenience but that arising from a chronic disorder: his habits have ever been sober; his favourite drink, once beer, now milk and water; his diet chiefly potatoes. I asked him to teach my daughter, but he declined; adding, however, that it was too hard for a young girl, but that nothing would give him greater pleasure, if he thought it could be done."

Lord Bristol gave Ó hAmhsaigh three guineas and ground rent free to build a house, joining the family at the housewarming. Lord Bristol helped alleviate the family's distress "in the dear year, his lordship called in his coach and six, stopped at the door, and gave a guinea to buy meal."

Ó hAmhsaigh is buried in St. Aiden's Church graveyard, Magilligan, County Londonderry, on the hill to the right of the new Church.

== Nickname ==
He was known as the man with two heads because of a growth, or wen; the year before he died it was described as "greatly increased; it is now hanging over his neck and shoulders, nearly as large as his head, from which circumstance he derives his appellative, "the man with two heads."

== See also ==
- Belfast Harp Festival
