= Charles Fanning (harper) =

Irish harper

Charles Fanning, Irish harper, born Foxford, County Mayo, 1736, died after 1792.

A son of a comfortable farmer and notable harper named Loughlin Fanning, he was taught by County Roscommon harper, Thady Smith.

A friend and rival of Arthur O'Neill, Fanning performed at the Granard Harp Festivals of 1781, 1782 and 1783, each time winning first prize. He accomplished the same feat at Belfast in 1792.

Captain Francis O'Neill said of him:

"Charles Fanning preferred Ulster to his native province, and although certain important episodes in his life happened at Tyrone, his chief haunts were in the County of Cavan. The mistake of his life was marrying the kitchen maid of one of his early patrons, a Mrs. Baillie who was a good performer on the harp herself, and who had entertained him at her table, and introduced him to genteel company. The result is well expressed in the concise language of Bunting: “He was also patronized by the celebrated Earl of Bristol, the great Bishop of Derry; but in consequence of having married a person in low life and corresponding habits, he never attained to respectability or independence."
