= Arthur O'Neill (harpist) =

Arthur O'Neill (1726 or 1734 – October 1816) was an Irish harper, a virtuoso player of the Irish harp or cláirseach: he was active during the final decades of its unbroken instrumental tradition in the later 18th and very early 19th century. He was closely associated with Edward Bunting, and the Belfast Harp Society's ultimately unsuccessful attempt to preserve the instrument, attending the Belfast Harper's Assembly and serving as the Society's harp tutor until 1813. He is best known for his lively and humorous memoir, collected by Bunting, which contained many reminiscences of famous harpers (such as Carolan) and of the environment in which they played.

== Life and memoirs ==
O'Neill said he was born in Drumnastrade townland in the parish of Clonfeacle, County Tyrone, around 1737. He was blinded as the result of an accident early in life: "At the age of two years I was diverting myself with a pen-knife which pierced my right eye, but was not deprived of the sight of it immediately. I had a Grandmother who loved me to excess, and she, perceiving my eye in danger, sent everywhere for Oculists and Doctors to cure me. I had to submit to all their prescriptions, and the result was, that in their efforts to cure one eye, I unfortunately lost the sight of both".

He began instruction on the harp at the age of ten with Owen Keenan of Augher, and by the time he was fifteen became an itinerant musician. His memoir consists largely of descriptions of journeys he undertook around the country, including several accounts of competitions at which he played, interspersed with broadly humorous anecdotes. He was aware that some of these anecdotes, or his estimation of other harpers' characters, might cause offence (he described Arthur Short of Tyrone, for example, as "but an indifferent performer [...] very peevish [...] I was informed he was about a hundred times married") but admitted he cared "not a pin" who might read the memoir. His chief musical rival was his friend Charles Fanning, who beat him at each of the Granard Harp Festivals in 1781–3 (O'Neill jokingly claimed that the first loss was due to him having worn his best clothes, leading the judges to think the shabbily-dressed Fanning more deserving of the prize).

O'Neill claimed to have, in his youth, restrung and played the Trinity College Harp, then known as "Brian Boru Harp", and which was then owned by a Counsellor McNamara, the Recorder of Limerick. At the latter's request O'Neill said that he played it through Limerick city:

and was followed by a procession of upwards of five hundred people, both gentle and simple. They seemed to be every one imbibed with the national spirit, when they heard it was the instrument that our celebrated Irish monarch played upon, before he routed the Danes at Clontarf, out of poor Erin. The Lord be merciful to you Brian Borou. I hope in God, I will tune your harp again in your presence in heaven, and if it should be the case, upon my honour and conscience I will not play the tunes of the "Protestant Boys" or " July the First'; but I would willingly play "God Save the King," and that would be yourself, Brian.

In July 1792, the musician and collector Edward (Atty) Bunting. Bunting brought O'Neill to Belfast's first Harp Festival. This had been staged for the benefit of the Belfast Charitable Society but coincided with the town's Bastille Day celebrations, complete with parades by local Volunteer corps, and resolutions in favour of Catholic Emancipation and Parliamentary Reform. The festival was widely interpreted as an expression of a new republican-tinged patriotism. In 1808, with the support of Dr James MacDonnell and his brother Alexander (the Presbyterian sons of Michael Roe, a Catholic relation of the earls of Antrim) whom O'Neill had tutored, Bunting again brought O'Neill to Belfast as tutor for the Belfast Harp Society. The society's subscribers included many who attended the 1792 and had been associated with the Society of United Irishmen, among them Dr. William Drennan; Francis, John, and Mary Ann, McCracken, brothers and sister to Henry Joy McCracken who had been hanged as a rebel in "'98"; Thomas McCabe; and brothers William and Robert Tennent.

Although some controversy attended his treatment by the society, which struggled financially, in 1813 O'Neill retired on a pension provided by the James MacDonnell to County Tyrone. He died in late October 1816 in Maydown, County Armagh, and was buried near his birthplace, in the churchyard at Eglish.

== Harp ==
The historic, probably 18th-century harp known as the Belfast Museum Harp, or "O'Neill Harp", was said to have been one of O'Neill's instruments, although its provenance has also been questioned; another of O'Neill's harps was said by Patrick Byrne to have been burnt by one Samuel Patrick, "a bad harper", at the Harp Society's premises sometime after O'Neill's death.
