= Edward Bunting =

Irish musician and folk music collector

Edward "Atty" Bunting (1773-1843)

Edward Bunting (1773– 17 March 1843) was an Irish musician and folk music collector active in Belfast. His A General Collection of the Ancient Irish Music was published in 1796. His A General Collection of the Ancient Music of Ireland was published in 1809. His The Ancient Music of Ireland was published in 1840.

== Life ==
Bunting was born in County Armagh, Ireland. At the age of seven he was sent to study music at Drogheda and at eleven he was apprenticed to William Ware, organist at St. Anne's church in Belfast and lived with the family of Henry Joy McCracken. At nineteen he was engaged to transcribe music from oral-tradition harpists at the Belfast Harp Festival in 1792. As Bunting was a classically trained musician, he did not understand the unique characteristics of Irish music, such as modes, and when transcribing tunes he 'corrected' them according to Classical music rules. One proof of this is that some tunes published by him were in keys that could not have been played by the harpists. His notes on the harpists, how they played and the terminology they used is however invaluable, and also many tunes would have been lost if he had not collected them.

Bunting's arrangement of the festival melodies for the pianoforte and notes were published in London as A General Collection of the Ancient Music of Ireland in 1796.

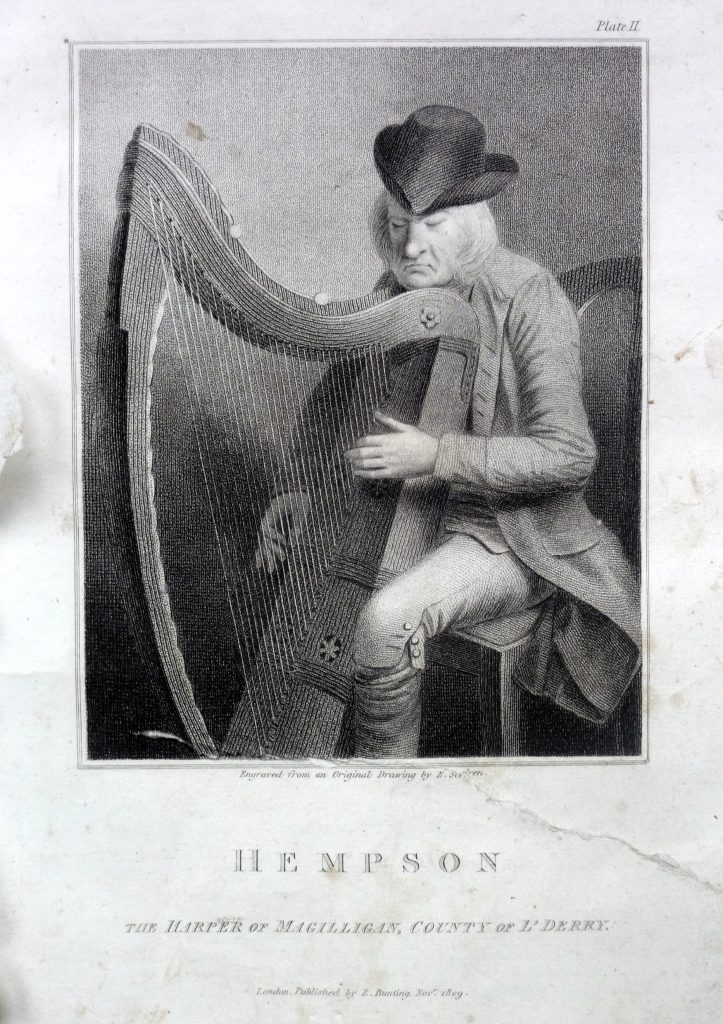
Illustration from 1809 of Hempson (Donnchadh Ó hAmhsaigh) the Harper of Magilligan

Bunting organised a second festival in 1813 and wrote to the Belfast Charitable Society, based at Clifton House, for support. This was granted and the proceeds of the festival were donated to the Charitable Society to help the poor of Belfast.

Bunting went on a number of collecting tours between 1792 and 1807, and was the first to transcribe music 'in the field' as played by the musicians. He realised the importance of the Irish words to the songs and Patrick Lynch was employed to collect these. Bunting, who lived in Belfast with the McCrackens until his marriage in 1819, moved to Dublin where he held the post of organist at St. Stephen's Church and taught music. He died in Dublin on 21 December 1843 and is buried at the Cemetery of Mount Jerome, Dublin.

Rendition of a harp tune from his collection

Bunting's papers were lost for many years, but were rediscovered in 1907 and currently reside in the Special Collections department of Queen's University of Belfast. Donal O'Sullivan has restored the original words to the airs that Bunting published without the words. The Chieftains' 1993 album "The Celtic Harp" is a tribute to Edward Bunting.

The first commercial recording of Bunting's collection was Edward Bunting's The Ancient Music of Ireland – the 1840 Edition [2010, 8-cd set, Trigon, 151 tracks].

== The Ancient Music of Ireland (1840) ==
Bunting published The Ancient Music of Ireland in three volumes. The first volume, published in 1796, contained 66 tunes which he had notated at the Belfast Harp Festival. The second volume 77 tunes was published in 1809.

In 1840, Bunting issued his third collection of The Ancient Music of Ireland, complete with 151 tunes. "A Dissertation on the Irish Harp and Harpers, Including an Account of the Old Melodies of Ireland" of about ninety pages is also included. With this final volume, Bunting hoped to promote the antiquity not only of the Irish music he had collected, but also of the Irish harp. He also wished to provide "the remaining airs of the collection arranged in true harp style."

The Preface

The Preface to this third volume allowed Bunting to state his opinions on modern usage of the ancient tunes, as well as rehash the event ("the great meeting of the Harpers at Belfast, in the year 1792"), which had been his starting point in the music collecting field. This document begins with the author's defence of the value of studying Irish music of antiquity. Bunting claims that music passes through the ages unchanged, making it therefore just as good an indicator of the culture of the ancients as the study of "civil and military antiquities". This music of the ancients originated in the educated bard class of Harpers who travelled between the houses of the Irish gentlemen, performing, teaching, and composing to please their current patron. According to Bunting, because the words that accompanied melodies changed from county to county, they were unreliable and had been left out for the most part from his collection.

Next, Bunting discusses the 1792 Harpers Festival. The Belfast Festival attracted eleven Harpers in total, ten from Ireland and one from Wales. Bunting was contracted to notate the tunes played at this festival in an effort to preserve the ancient tradition, which was seen to be quickly fading. Gaining inspiration from his contact with the Harpers, especially Denis Hempson (Donnchadh Ó Hámsaigh) and Arthur O'Neill, Bunting visited counties Londonderry, Tyrone and the province of Connacht in an effort to continue collecting ancient airs from "the country people" and to learn from Hempson whatever he could about the harp. After dismissing three earlier attempts at publication of ancient tunes (Burke Thumoth in 1720, "Neill of Christ Churchyard, soon after," and "Carolan's son" in 1747), Bunting goes on to say that his first collection, published four years after the Belfast Festival, "was the only collection of genuine Irish harp music given to the world up to the year 1796."

Throughout the Preface, Bunting states his displeasure at the treatment ancient Irish tunes had received at the hands of Sir John Andrew Stevenson, the arranger for Thomas Moore's extremely popular Irish Melodies series. While complimenting Moore's "elegant" poetry, Bunting "saw with pain, and still deplores the fact, that in these new Irish melodies, the work of the poet was accounted of so paramount an interest, that the proper order of song writing was in many instances inverted, and, instead of the words being adapted to the tune, the tune was too often adapted to the words, a solecism which could never have happened had the reputation of the writer not been so great as at once to carry the tunes he deigned to make use of altogether out of their old sphere among the simple and tradition-loving people of the country – with whom, in truth, many of the new melodies, to this day, are hardly suspected to be themselves."

Bunting allots three different time periods to the music in his collection: "very ancient", "the ancient" and music "composed from the time of Carolan to that of Jackson and Stirling". "Very ancient" tunes are either "caoinans or dirges" or "airs to which Ossianic and other very old poems are sung". Despite his earlier arguments that words were unreliable, Bunting here uses their consistency to prove antiquity, meaning that if the same lyrics to a song are found wherever that song is sung, then it must be very ancient. Bunting also ascribes a particular "structure" to ancient songs, which he deliberates upon in his dissertation found later in this edition. Contrary to Thomas Moore's belief that modernity can be ascribed to all of the best native Irish airs, Bunting would put forth that the best airs are ancient and products of a time "when the native nobles of the country cultivated music as a part of education". Tunes with the label of "ancient" may be by unknown composers, but some were made by Scott, Lyons, Daly, Conallon, and O'Cahan. The third time frame contains pieces of "a more ornamental and less nervous style". Bunting tells us that music from this time period was also "infected" with Italian music, as this style was quite in vogue with the composers. In Bunting's opinion, Turlough Carolan, though a wonderful composer, was particularly guilty of incorporating this foreign music into his compositions.

The Dissertation

Chapter 1

Bunting begins this chapter by refuting the established claim that the neglect or inclusion "of the fourth and seventh tones of the diatonic scale" are characteristic of the Irish tune. Through his study, Bunting has found that it is in fact the "presence" of the "Submediant or major sixth" (i.e. the sixth scale degree) in any given tune that lends it an Irish flavour. Bunting tells us, what makes music Irish is not a "deficiency" of a tone or tones, but rather the inclusion of one. Continuing in his discussion of the "peculiarity" of "Irish melody", Bunting lays out what he considers to be the harmony of "three-fourths of our (Irish) song and harp airs", explaining that they "are for the most part in a major key, and in triple time; the modulation of the first part of the melody may be said to consist of the common cadence; the second part is generally an octave higher than the first; it begins with the chord of the Tonic, and proceeds to the tone of the Submediant with the major harmony of the Subdominant, or to the Submediant with its minor concord; but the harmony of this peculiar note is most frequently accompanied by the major concord of the Subdominant; the conclusion of the air is generally a repetition of the first part of the tune, with a little variation."

Despite this eloquent description, Bunting contends that harp tunes (as opposed to airs) are "impossible" to fit into "any similar model". However, these tunes do sound Irish because of their inclusion of the sixth scale degree.

Chapter 2

In this chapter, Bunting shares some harp music theory and performance practice. He begins by refuting the trend then current to give Irish music too much "plaintive," "national," and "melancholy" feeling. Bunting claims to have been quite "surprised to find that all the melodies played by the Harpers were performed with a much greater degree of quickness than he had till then been accustomed to".

A few pages later, Bunting includes a table of Irish words for different harp parts, practices, and strings. For example, Bunting claims that the Irish have a few different names for harps: Clarseach for "the common harp", Cinnard-Cruit for "the high-headed harp", Crom-cruit for "the down-bending harp", Ceirnin for "the portable harp, used by the priests and religious people", Craiftin Cruit for "Craftin's harp", and Lub "a poetical name of the harp." Following this is a description with small musical examples of each string on the harp, as well as the proper tuning for the ancient instrument. After this is a table of practices, also with musical examples. Some of these are bualladh suas no suaserigh or "succession of triplets" and sruith-mor or "a great stream, ascending or descending". To conclude the chapter, Bunting gives the reader an idea of some "times", "moods", and "keys" used by the ancient harpers, as well as a vast vocabulary list of other Irish musical terms. An online multimedia edition of these tables has been published at http://www.earlygaelicharp.info/Irish_Terms/.

Chapter 3

Bunting opens chapter 3 with an introduction to George Petrie's Memoir of Ancient Irish Harp Preserved in Trinity College. In this introduction, Bunting shows the reader two images, which he analyses with respect to the ancient way of playing the harp. Following this can be found a brief account of the Irish harp by Galilei in 1581, from which Bunting concludes that the ancient harp must have had between twenty-nine and thirty strings.

Petrie's Memoir begins with the legend of the origins of "Brian Boru's harp", currently housed in the library at Trinity College. In Petrie's words, "we are told that Donogh, the son and successor of the celebrated Brian Boru, who was killed at the battle of Clontarf in 1014, having murdered his brother Teague, in 1023, was deposed by his nephew, in consequence of which he retired to Rome, carrying with him the crown, harp, and other regalia of his father, which he presented to the Pope to obtain absolution […] These regalia were kept in the Vatican till the Pope sent the harp to Henry VIII, with the title of Defender of the Faith, but kept the crown, which was of massive gold.

The legend continues, with Henry VIII giving the harp to the "Earl of Clanricarde". The harp subsequently passed through many Irish hands, before Chevalier O'Gorman donated it to Trinity College. Petrie relegates this tale to the realm of invention, quoting Thomas Moore's dismissal of the story. Moore bases his argument on the fact that nowhere in the annals of Irish history does this story exist, and in fact, it can be refuted by the recorded fact that Donogh never possessed his father's crown and by the arms that rest on the harp itself. Petrie goes on to place the harp as an ecclesiastic instrument because of its small size. Now we move back to Bunting who informs us that the harp is of "exquisite workmanship". With only "one row of strings" this harp had "thirty in number". It was also made of oak and thirty-two inches high.

Next follows Bunting's discussion of several icons, which he uses to prove the date of the "Brian Boru's harp" model as up until the seventeenth century. Immediately after can be found Bunting's dismissal of the idea that Irish musicians learned their trade from the Continent. Instead, Bunting argues that the Welsh imported Irish bards to teach them music. Moving on, Bunting examines in some detail three figures holding harps found on engravings. One that particularly interests him is of a naked bard holding a harp without a "fore pillar". This type of harp Bunting likens to the Egyptian model. Bunting moves on to discuss the origins of the Egyptian harp, claiming that its origins are from the testudo, which itself derives from the cithara. Bunting continues his discussion with details of the greatness through the ages of the Irish harp, illustrated by the legends of St Brigid and Angus King of Munster. Later, Bunting refutes the claim that there were no bagpipes in Ireland, using as proof three depictions: two of a bagpiper going into battle and another of a pig playing a bagpipe.

Chapter 4

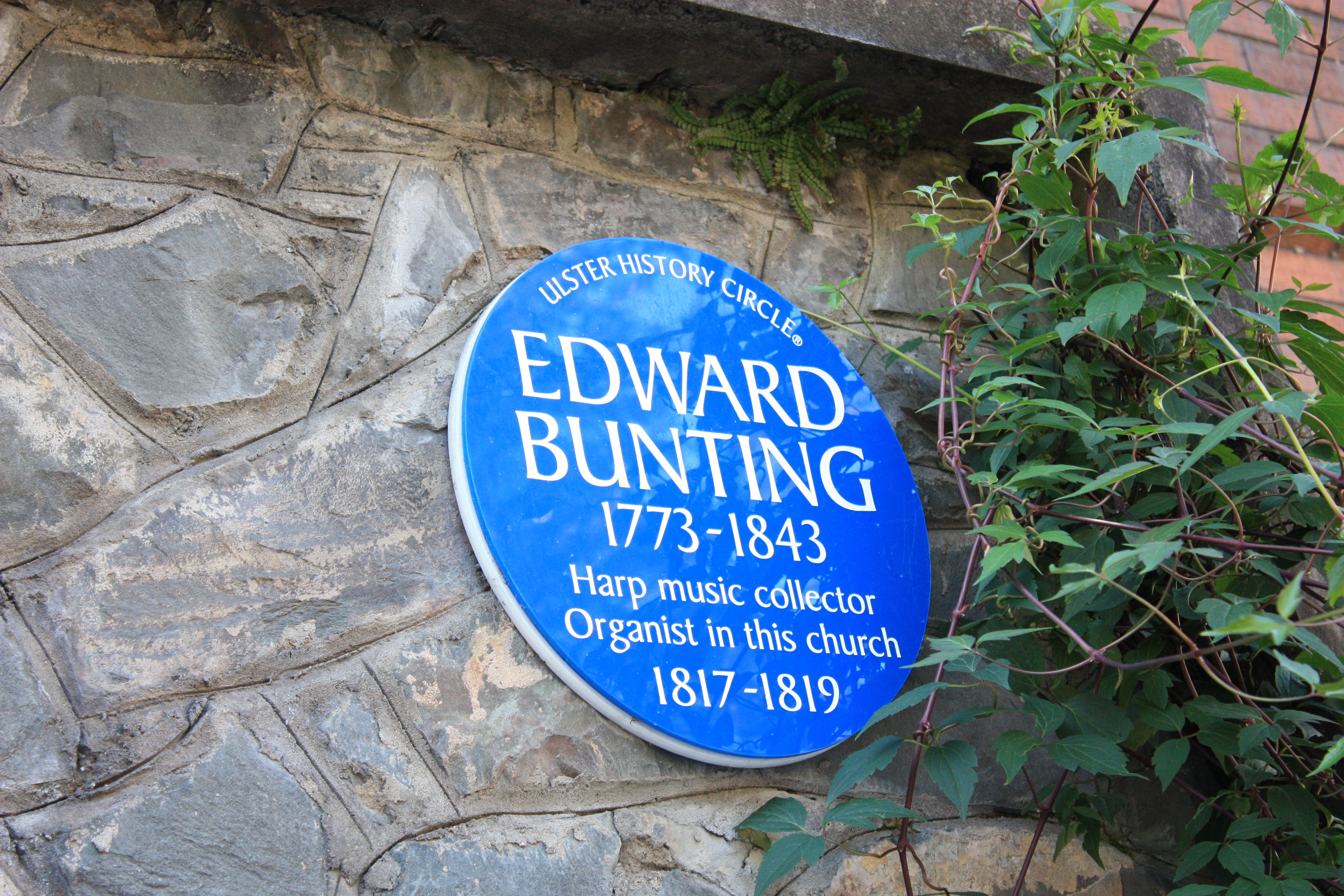
Edward Bunting plaque, St George's Church, High Street, Belfast, October 2009

In this chapter, Bunting goes into much greater detail about "efforts to revive the Irish Harp." He discusses at some length the events of the meeting of the Harpers in Belfast, giving the names of all of the bards who attended. He gives the names as: Dennis Hempson, age 97; Arthur O'Neill, age 58; Charles Fanning, age 56; Daniel Black, age 75; Charles Byrne, age 80; Hugh Higgins, age 55; Patrick Quin, age 47; William Carr, age 15; Rose Mooney, age 52; and James Duncan, age 45. He also mentions the Welsh harper, Williams, in a brief footnote. Here we also find an account of the failed Belfast Harp Society, which had hoped to educate a new generation of young Harpers.

Chapter 5

This chapter contains biographies of all of the Irish harpers listed in Chapter 4.

Chapter 6

In this chapter, Bunting included what he considered to be items worth noting in some of the pieces that are part of his collection.

== Publications ==
- A General Collection of the Ancient Irish Music (1796), 66 tunes
- A General Collection of the Ancient Music of Ireland (1809)
- The Ancient Music of Ireland (1840), 165 airs

Collections reissued

- Waltons in 2002 as The Irish Music Manuscripts of Edward Bunting (1773–1843) (ISBN 1-85720-139-6). This itself is a paperback reprint of a 1969 hardback.

== Bibliography ==
- "Bunting, Edward" . Dictionary of National Biography. London: Smith, Elder & Co. 1885–1900.
- Donal O Sullivan, Journal of the Irish Folk Song Society, 1927–1939.
- Bunting, Edward, The Ancient Music of Ireland Arranged for Piano (Dover, 2000; original 1840)
