= Belfast Harp Festival =

1792 Irish musical event

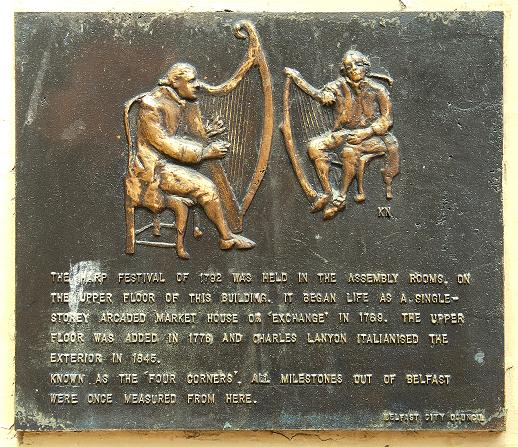
A plaque commemorating the harpers

The Belfast Harp Festival, called by contemporary writers The Belfast Harpers Assembly, 11–14 July 1792, was a three-day musical and patriotic event organised in Belfast, Ireland, by leading members of the local Society for Promoting Knowledge (the Linen Hall Library): Dr. James MacDonnell, Robert Bradshaw, Henry Joy, and Robert Simms. Edward Bunting, a young classically trained organist, was commissioned to notate the forty tunes performed by ten harpists attending, work that was to form the major part of his General Collection of the Ancient Irish Music (1796). The venue of the contest was in The Assembly Room on Waring Street in Belfast which was opened as a market house in 1769.

It was staged for the benefit of the Belfast Charitable Society but coincided with the town's Bastille Day celebrations with which it shared patrons and supporters. These celebrations involved the trooping of local Volunteer corps carrying flags and banners hailing the French Declaration of the Rights of Man, American liberties, and the new Polish Constitution and concluded with town-meeting resolutions, carried by the new-formed United Irishmen, in favour of Catholic Emancipation and Parliamentary Reform. A handbill, advertising the festival, had been clear as to its patriotic intent: in view of "how intimately the Spirit and Character of a PEOPLE are connected with their National Poetry and Music", it presumed that "the Irish PATRIOT and POLITICAN [sic], will not deem it an object unworthy [of] his patronage and protection".

The festival is said to have marked "the beginning of a long association between northern Protestants and the Gaelic revival". In the 1790s, interest in the Irish harp, stemmed from a combination of cultural and political motives. Emboldened by the revolution in France, Presbyterians in the north-east of Ireland were seeking to ally with the kingdom's Catholic majority against the Anglican ("Protestant") Ascendancy and in favour of a representative national government. Recognition of the Gaelic past as a common inheritance was seen to bridge the sectarian divide and, as a badge of separate and distinctive Irish culture, bolstered demands for greater autonomy from England.

== Precursors ==
In July 1784, eight years before the assembly of harpers in Belfast, there had been the first of three annual harp competitions, each with a ball and supper, held in Granard, in County Longford. The patron was John Dungan, a wealthy Catholic merchant living in Copenhagen, Denmark, who had decided "to retain and support the original instrument" of his own country. The premiums he provided for the best players were disbursed by Michael Dungan (most likely his brother) who was secretary in Granard of the patriot Volunteer corps. Among the harpists engaged were Arthur O'Neill and Charles Fanning who were to feature in the later Belfast assembly.

== Harpers ==
As at Granard, the express objective of the festival in Belfast was to assemble the remaining traditional harp players to compete for prizes, and preserve/notate the dying Irish harp tradition and its pieces. It was attended by ten Irish harpers and one Welsh harper, and many tunes were played. They were notated by Edward Bunting, and published under his name as A General Collection of the Ancient Music of Ireland in 1796.

- Donnchadh Ó Hámsaigh (Denis Hampson), blind (County Londonderry), aged 96, played with long, crooked fingernails.
- Arthur O'Neill, blind (County Tyrone), winner of second prize for "The green woods of Truagh".
- Charles Fanning (County Cavan), winner of first prize for "The coulin, or Cúilfhionn".
- Dan Black, blind (Derry)
- Charles Byrne (County Leitrim)
- Hugh Higgins, blind (County Mayo)
- Patrick Quinn, blind (County Armagh)
- William Caer (Armagh)
- James Duncan (County Down)
- Rose Mooney, winner of third place blind (County Meath)
- Williams, first name unknown (Wales)

William Caer was 15 years of age while all of the others were over 45 years old. Three winners were selected (Fanning took first place) and each was awarded a yearly stipend of £10. Edward Bunting subsequently visited each winner, one after the other, to collate all of the available contemporary harp music. He did not publish all this material until 1796, 1809, and 1840. Songs saved through this effort include: Feaghan Gealeash, Deirdre's Lament for the Sons of Usneach (thought to be the oldest extant piece of Irish music), Scott's Lamentation, The Battle of Argan More, Ossianic Air, Blackheaded Deary, Open the Door Softly (played by Arthur O'Neill), The Lament for Limerick, and Chorus Jig (a jig in name only).

The Rev. George Vaughan Sampson wrote of Denis Hampson that:

he played at the famous meeting of harpers at Belfast, under the patronage of some amateurs of Irish music. Mr Bunton, the celebrated musician of that town, was here the year before, at Hampson's, noting his tunes and his manner of playing, which is in the best old style. He said, with the honest feeling of self love, "When I played the old tunes, not another of the harpers would play after me.

== Belfast Harp Society ==
The impetus behind the festival survived the 1798 insurrection the United Irishmen (under the banner of the harp without the crown) and the 1800 Acts of Union which abolished the Kingdom of Ireland with its parliament in Dublin. In 1808, those involved in organising the festival in 1792, including James MacDonnell and Edward Bunting organised the first of the Belfast Harp societies. Employing Arthur O’Neill as the principal tutor, they sought to train a new generation of Irish harpists from among poor children, chosen, in the patriotic tradition of 1792, without reference to religious distinction.

With the assistance and contributions of Mary Ann McCracken, Bunting published a second volume of his work The Ancient Music of Ireland in 1809.

== The Linen Hall Harp Festival of 1903 ==
In 1903, a week-long harpers' festival, originally intended by the members of the Linen Hall Library for the centenary of the 1792 festival, was held in Belfast. Such large crowds attended that, after the first night, the concert was moved from the library's new premises to one of the city's larger halls. The first Ulster branch of the Gaelic League had been formed in 1895 in east Belfast under the active patronage (until he left to become Church of Ireland Lord Bishop of Ossory) of the Rev. John Baptiste Crozier and the presidency of his parishioner, Dr. John St Clair Boyd, both unionists. It marked a renewal of interest in Irish studies among the educated middle class that briefly straddled the city's sectarian divide.

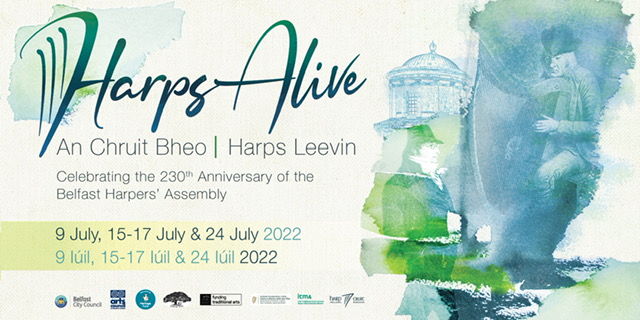
The Artwork for the Harps Alive festival celebrating the 1792 Harp Assembly

In 2022 a group called Reclaim the Enlightenment based in Belfast joined with a number of other groups to bring a 230th Anniversary Festival.
