= List of Irish music collectors =

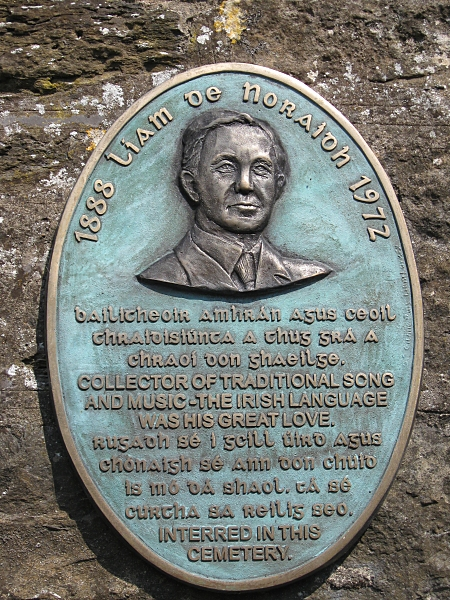
Plaque commemorating Liam de Noraidh

This is a list of notable collectors of Irish traditional music:

== Collectors ==
- Breandan Breathnach (1912–1985) – collected over 7,000 tunes, published from 1963
- Edward Bunting (1773–1843) – collected tunes from the harpers at the Belfast Harp Festival; made extensive collections of tunes which he published in three collections of The Ancient Music of Ireland
- Séamus Clandillon – see Maighréad Ní Annagáin
- Eileen Costello – Amhrain Mhuighe Seola, 1923, 80 songs from County Galway and County Mayo
- Seamus Ennis (1919–1982) – uilleann piper; collected for the BBC/Irish Folklore Commission, 1952–57
- William Forde (c.1759–1850)
- A. Martin Freeman (1878–1959) – important collector of songs from West Cork
- Canon James Goodman (1828–1896) – collected over 2000 tunes and songs, mainly from the south-west of the country.
- Carmel Gunning – a singer, flute and tin whistle player and collector of songs and ballads; author of The Mountain Top (2006) which contains over sixty tunes focusing on tunes popular in south County Sligo
- Carl Hardebeck (1869–1945) – three volumes of Seoda Ceoil (1908, 1914, 1916)
- Frank Harte (1934–2005) – collector of songs and ballads from Dublin and the countryside
- Sam Henry (1878–1952) – Song Editor to the Coleraine newspaper Northern Constitution, through which he published his Songs of the People series from 1923 until 1928, and again from 1932 until 1939.
- Smollet(t) Holden (c.1755–1813) – Collection of Old Established Irish Slow and Quick Tunes, c.1805, and Collection of the Most Esteemed Old Irish Melodies, c. 1807
- Henry Philerin Hudson (1798–1889)
- Herbert Hughes (1882–1937) – Songs of Uladh (1904), Irish Country Songs, 4 volumes (1909, 1913, 1934, 1936)
- Patrick Weston Joyce (1827–1914)
- Fionan MacColuim – Amhrain na nGleann, Cosa Bui Arda (children's songs), 1922–24
- John McCreery, compiled a book of Irish airs with American lyrics by John Daly Burk, published Petersburg, USA, 1824. "A selection from the Ancient Music of Ireland, arranged for the flute or violin, some of the most admired melodies, adapted to American poetry. Chiefly composed by John McCreery to which is prefixed historical and critical observations on ancient Irish music"
- Ciaran MacMathuna (1925–2009) – broadcaster and collector of music from mid 20th century
- John Mulholland – Collection of Ancient Airs, two volumes, 80 airs noted, Belfast, 1810; Mulholland's father started to collect in the mid 18th century
- Tom Munnelly (1944–2007) – former chairman of the Irish Traditional Music Archive; he is estimated to have collected around 1,500 tapes' worth of material
- Maighréad Ní Annagáin and Séamus Clandillon – Londubh an Chairn, 1927 Munster songs
- Pádraigín Ní Uallacháin – Oriel singer and author of A Hidden Ulster: people, songs and traditions from Oriel (2003). Ní Uallacháin has recorded numerous music recordings of collected traditional song
- Liam de Noraidh (1888–1972) – Ceol ó'n Mumhain, Munster songs, 1965
- Seán Ó Baoighill [O'Boyle] (1908–1979) – Cnuasacht de Cheoltai Uladh, c.1948, Donegal Gaeltacht
- O'Farrell (Patrick?) (active c.1780–1810) – uilleann piper, published the following (containing some 300 tunes):

- Collection of National Irish Music for the Union Pipes, c.1800
- O'Farrell's Pocket Companion for the Irish or Union Pipes, 1806–11

- Francis O'Neill (1848–1936) – chief of the Chicago police and collector of Irish tunes
- Luke O'Malley – c.1976 Luke O'Malley's Collection of Irish Music 150 jigs, reels & hornpipes
- Fr. L. Ó Muiri – Amhrain Chuige Uladh, 1927, songs from the Omeath and Tyrone Gaeltacht
- Donal O'Sullivan (1893–1973) – Songs of the Irish, 1960
- George Petrie (1790–1866) – an antiquarian, artist and important collector of Irish airs and melodies.
- John Edward Pigot (1822–1871) – collected over 2000 airs
- Frank Roche (1866–1961) – born in Knocklong, County Limerick, his father was a dancing master. His first collection of two volumes was published in 1912 and revised to three volumes in 1927. The last collection in 1931, Airs and Fantasied. His works were re-issued by Ossian Publications in 1982 and consist of 566 tunes.
- Micho Russell (1915–1994) – musician, folklorist and collector.
- William Bradbury Ryan – 1050 Reels and Jigs Hornpipes and Clogs, Boston, 1883
- Paddy O'Brien (1945–) – collected 1,500 melodies (jigs, reels, hornpipes, polkas, slip jigs, hop jigs, single jigs, slow airs, set dances, harp tunes, marches) in The Paddy O'Brien Tune Collection: A Personal Treasury of Irish Traditional Music, 1995–2013

=== Collections by unknown authors ===
- Poets and Poetry of Munster, 1849.

== See also ==
- Irish music collecting
- Category:Irish folk-song collectors
