= Dónal O'Connor =

Irish multi-instrumentalist

- Dónal O'Connor

Background information
- Born: Dónal O'Connor; Ravensdale, County Louth, Ireland
- Genres: Irish traditional Folk; Celtic music
- Occupations: Musician, producer, composer, Music teacher, Television presenter
- Years active: 1996–present
- Labels: At First Light; Compass Records; Vertical Records
- Member of: At First Light
- Website: www.redboxrecording.com/about/donal-oconnor/

Dónal O'Connor is an Irish multi-instrumentalist, producer and television presenter, producer & director from Ravensdale, County Louth, Ireland. He was a member of Belfast-based Irish traditional groups Ulaid & At First Light and his parents group Lá Lugh.

== Early life ==
O'Connor was born into an Irish-speaking household. His father is fiddler Gerry O'Connor and his mother was singer and flute player Eithne Ní Uallacháin (died 1999). His maternal grandparents were Pádraig Ó hUallacháin, a teacher, writer and song collector, and Eithne bean Uí Uallacháin. His paternal grandmother was fiddler and fiddle teacher Rose O'Connor. O'Connor is also the nephew of singers Pádraigín Ní Uallacháin and Len Graham.

== Career ==
=== 1996–2005: Lá Lugh to festivals ===
O'Connor's first recorded fiddle work appeared on Brighid's Kiss in 1996, an album by Lá Lugh, his parents' group. That year, the album was voted Album of the Year by Irish Music Magazine readers.

In 2001, O'Connor was invited to join Mike McGoldrick, John McSherry and Paul McSherry to launch 'At First Light' on a tour of Ireland and subsequently at Helsinki Folk Festival, Open House Festival, Return to Camden Town, Copenhagen Irish Festival and Dranouter Folk Festival in Belgium. That year, he produced Pádraigín Ní Uallacháin's Laoi Faoi, which was nominated for the RTÉ/Réalt Song Contest. In 2003, O'Connor featured on New Irish Hymns (released as In Christ Alone in the United States) by Moya Brennan, Margaret Becker and Joanne Hogg with compositions by Keith Getty and in the summer of that year presented the BBC Radio Ulster programme Cualán. O'Connor acted as music teaching consultant on the 2003 film, The Boys and Girl from County Clare, directed by John Irvin and starring Andrea Corr, Colm Meaney and Bernard Hill.

O'Connor performed with Neil Martin's The West Ocean String Quartet on RTÉ's The Raw Bar in 2004 and with Gerry O'Connor on BBC2's Ceol i gCuideachta and on TG4's Geantraí. He again in 2004 featured on Irish-language television station TG4's broadcast of Sé Mo Laoch, that year focussing on the life and work of his paternal grandmother Rose O'Connor. O'Connor appeared on Brian Kennedy's 2004 album On Song and on Gerry O'Connor's Journeyman, which he also co-produced.

=== 2006–2010: Tripswitch and Six Days in Down ===
In April 2006, O'Connor released Tripswitch, a collaboration with uilleann piper and Lúnasa co-founder John McSherry. Compositions by the duo and collaborators feature Irish, Celtic and Celtiberian musical influences. Tripswitch was well received by critics, with positive reviews in The Irish Times, The Living Tradition, The Irish Echo and Songlines. O'Connor and McSherry chose the name At First Light for their touring band, performing on TG4's Geantraí (and featuring on the CD/DVD recording of the 2006 series), RTÉ Radio 1's The Late Session, BBC Radio Ulster's Blas and RTÉ Raidió na Gaeltachta to promote the album.

In Spring 2006, O'Connor presented BBC2's 10-part music series, An Stuif Ceart and in 2007 appeared on Blas Ceoil (BBC Two) and BBC Radio Ulster's Arts Extra. In 2008, O'Connor was commissioned to compose idents for BBC Radio Ulster's Irish language department whilst also touring extensively, including performances at Temple Bar TradFest, Return to Camden Town and William Kennedy International Piping Festival.

2009 saw O'Connor return with at First Light to Glasgow's Celtic Connections festival and World Folk Cultures Festival in Taiwan, also performing in Ireland and Paris. In 2010, he released Six Days in Down with John McSherry and American guitarist Bob Brozman. The trio appeared on BBC Radio 3's Late Junction among others to discuss the album. The group performed in the UK an Ireland to promote the album. Six Days in Down was co-produced by O'Connor and featured traditional singer Stephanie Makem, niece of Tommy Makem. In 2009 O'Connor also performed with at First Light at The Irish Festival of Oulu, Finland.

=== 2011–present ===
In 2011, O'Connor was commissioned by Louth County Council to compose and record a suite of music. Gort na Glaise was performed as part of the Drogheda Traditional Music weekend alongside Neil Martin and Michael McCague in an event also featuring writer and climber Dermot Somers. O'Connor was also commissioned that year by The Armagh Pipers Club to arrange and orchestrate a number of traditional tunes to be performed by an Uilleann pipe orchestra of 45 players. The orchestrations were performed at the 18th William Kennedy Piping Festival and was recorded by the Irish Traditional Music Archive. O'Connor received a second such commission in 2012.

O'Connor produced, arranged and played on Belfast singer Gráinne Holland's debut album, Teanga na nGael, released in August 2011. In Autumn 2011, he released Idir, his band's debut album and first release since at First Light took their name to promote O'Connor and McSherry's Tripswitch. The group toured extensively throughout Europe to promote the album, making their third appearance at the Celtic Connections festival. Idir was released in the United States by Compass Records in 2012.

In August 2012, O'Connor produced Pádraigín Ní Uallacháin's album LET THE FAIRIES IN, released on Halloween night 2012. He was commissioned to compose the film score for Shalom – Belfast, a feature film produced which will be broadcast on Israel's Channel 8 in 2012, and will appear at major film festivals. O'Connor and John McSherry are annual performers at The Soma Festival in Castlewellan, County Down.

In 2015 O'Connor joined longtime collaborator John McSherry and Beoga’s Sean Óg Graham to record Ulaid. A hefty touring schedule ensued and the trio have since collaborated with Mary Dillon of Déanta, Liam Ó Maonlaí Hothouse Flowers, Ríoghnach Connolly, and Muireann Nic Amhlaoibh formerly of Danú.

In 2017 Ulaid and Duke Special joined forces to record a live record 'A Note Let Go'. Charting the story of Belfast through song they occasionally come together to perform live.

O'Connor continues to produce records from his Redbox recording Studios in Belfast and also acts as producer and music supervisor on traditional music programmes for broadcasters in Ireland and the UK such as RTÉ, TG4, BBC NI and BBC Alba.

== Discography ==
Albums

- 2017 – A Note Let Go (Ulaid & Duke Special)
- 2015 – Ulaid – (John McSherry, Dónal O'Connor & Seán Óg Graham)
- 2012 – Idir (At First Light)
- 2011 – Gort na Glaise Dónal O'Connor
- 2008 – Six Days in Down (with Bob Brozman and John McSherry)
- 2006 – Tripswitch (John McSherry & Dónal O'Connor)

=== Further credits ===
(Co-)Producer

- 2004 – Journeyman (Gerry O'Connor)
- 2010 – Beo: Live at Maddens (Various artists)
- 2010 – About Time (Stevie Dunne)
- 2012 – Teanga na nGael (Gráinne Holland)
- 2012 – Let the Faries in (Pádraigín Ní Uallacháin)
- 2013 – The sun, the moon, the stars... and other moving objects (David Dee Moore)
- 2013 – Celtic Psalms (Kiran Young Wimberly)
- 2014 – Bilingua (Eithne Ní Uallacháin)
- 2015 – Skorsa : The Riddle of the Earth – (Susan Grace Bates)
- 2015 – Boy in a Boat – (Barry Kerr)
- 2015 – Súile – (Clann Mhic Ruairí)
- 2015 – Crossroads – (Marco Fabri)
- 2015 – The Northern Concertina – (Jason O'Rourke)
- 2015 – Gaelré – (Gráinne Holland)
- 2015 – Good Morning to Your Nightcap – (Paul Maguire, Ruadhraí O'Kane, Desy Adams & Ryan O'Donnell)
- 2015 – Ulaid – (John McSherry, Dónal O'Connor & Seán Óg Graham)
- 2016 – Clear Skies – (Réalta)
- 2016 – Tús Nua – (Gatehouse)
- 2017 – The Fox's Lament – (Martin Meehan)
- 2017 – A Note Let Go – (Ulaid & Duke Special)
- 2018 – Autumn Winds – (Niall Hanna)
- 2018 – Last Night's Joy – (Gerry O'Connor)
- 2018 – Up She Flew – (Steph Geremia)
- 2019 – Heather Down the Moor – (Gatehouse)
- 2019 – A Snapshot in Time – (Paula & Melanie Houton)
- 2024 – Seven Daughters of the Sea (Pádraigín Ní Uallacháin)

Appearances

- 1996 – Brighid's Kiss (Lá Lugh)
- 2003 – New Irish Hymns (Moya Brennan, Joanne Hogg, Margaret Becker)
- 2004 – On Song (Brian Kennedy)
- 2005 – Bye a While (Pádraig Rynne)
- 2010 – Soma (John McSherry)
- 2017 – Gossamer (Pauline Scanlon)
- 2018 – Foxglove & Fuscia (Muireann NicAmhlaoibh)
- 2019 – Swimming the Horses (Gerry O'Beirne)
- 2020 – Thar Toinn (Muireann NicAmhlaoibh)
- 2021 – Neadú (Muireann NicAmhlaoibh)
- 2024 – Seven Daughters of the Sea (Pádraigín Ní Uallacháin)

Recording/Mixing

- 2011 – Réalta – Open the Door for Three
- 2012 – The Olllam
- 2012 – Oirialla
- 2013 – Ronan Le Bars Group – Lammadour
- 2016 – Ronan Le Bars Group – An Erc'h Kentañ – The first snow (Coop Breizh)
- 2018 – Stevie Dunne – Live at the Crosskeys
- 2018 – Music in the Glen
- 2019 – The Blackwater Céilí Band – Music in the Valley
- 2019 – Joshua Burnside – Live at the Elmwood Hall
- 2019 – Bene + Cormac – Wavelength
- 2020 – Ronan le Bars – Strink Mor
