= Let the Fairies In =

Studio album by Pádraigín Ní Uallacháin
- Released: 29 September 2012
- Recorded: Seachrán Studios; Belfast, Northern Ireland
- Genre: Traditional Irish; Folk; Celtic
- Length: 33:01
- Label: Ceoltaí Éireann
- Producer: Dónal O'Connor

Pádraigín Ní Uallacháin chronology
Songs of the Scribe (2011)	Let the Fairies In (2012)	Seven Daughters of the Sea (2024)

Let the Fairies In is the eighth studio album by Irish singer Pádraigín Ní Uallacháin, the traditional singer in residence at the Seamus Heaney Centre for Poetry at Queen's University, Belfast. The album was released on 29 September 2012.

== Background ==
Pádraigín Ní Uallacháin recorded her first album for children, A Stór Is A Stóirín in 1994. Completely in the Irish language, Ní Uallacháin opted to record a similar album in English.

== Track listing ==
No.	Title	Length
1.	"The Dancing Child"	3:35
2.	"The Field Mouse’s Ball"	2:47
3.	"Cucanandy-O"	3:32
4.	"My Aunt Jane"	2:12
5.	"Christmas Day in the Morning"	2:21
6.	"The Magical Band"	3:12
7.	"Fair Rosa"	3:32
8.	"Rosemary Fair"	1:58
9.	"As I Roved Out"	2:23
10.	"Dance All Day"	2:26
11.	"The Fairy Walk"	5:08

== Personnel ==
- Pádraigín Ní Uallacháin – vocals, drones, bells
- Dónal O'Connor – producer
