= An Dealg Óir =

Studio album by Pádraigín Ní Uallacháin
- Released: 2002
- Recorded: 2001
- Genre: Traditional Irish; Folk; Celtic
- Length: 61:57
- Label: Gael Linn (2002–2022); Ceoltaí Éireann (2023–)
- Producer: Máire Breatnach

Pádraigín Ní Uallacháin chronology
| An Irish Lullaby (1999) | An Dealg Óir (2002) | Áilleacht (2005) |

Professional ratings
Review scores
| Source | Rating |
|---|---|
| Hot Press | favourable |

An Dealg Óir (meaning 'The Golden Thorn') is the fifth studio album from Irish singer Pádraigín Ní Uallacháin. The album was released on the Gael Linn label. The album is made up of songs from the Oriel area in southeast Ulster in Ireland. Éalaigh Liom / Elope With Me became one of Ní Uallacháin's most popular tracks since its broadcast on the BBC's Highland Sessions.

== Track listing ==
1. "Éalaigh Liom"
2. "Éirigh Suas, A Stóirín"
3. "An Seanduine Dóite"
4. "Is Fada an Lá"
5. "Ailí Gheal Chiúin"
6. "Amhrán na Craoibhe"
7. "Marbhna Airt Óig Uí Néill"
8. "Thugamar Féin an Samhradh Linn"
9. "Uilleagán Dubh Ó"
10. "Cailín as Contae Lú"
11. "Séamus Mac Murfaidh"
12. "Máire Bhán"
13. "An Bonnán Buí"
14. "Tá 'na Lá"

== Personnel ==
- Pádraigín Ní Uallacháin – vocals
- Steve Cooney - guitars
- Liam O'Flynn – uilleann pipes
- Laoise Kelly – Irish harp
- Liam Ó Maonlaí – whistles
- Ódhrán Ó Casaide - uilleann pipes, whistles
- Helen Davies – harp
- Máire Breatnach – fiddle, viola
- Rónán Ó Snodaigh – percussion
- Pat Crowley – piano, keyboards
