= Áilleacht =

Studio album by Pádraigín Ní Uallacháin
- Released: 2003-5
- Recorded: 2005
- Genres: Traditional Irish; Folk; Celtic
- Length: 52:20
- Labels: Gael Linn (2005–2022); Ceoltaí Éireann (2023–)
- Producer: Steve Cooney

Pádraigín Ní Uallacháin chronology
An Dealg Óir (2002)	Áilleacht (2003)	Songs of the Scribe (2011)

Áilleacht (or Áilleacht: Beauty) is the sixth studio album from Irish singer Pádraigín Ní Uallacháin, the fifth to be released on the Gael Linn label. The album's central theme is love, with songs mainly written by Ní Uallacháin. Áilleacht was recorded in Teelin, County Donegal.

Fantasy novelist O. R. Melling used verses from both "Gleann na nDeor" (Valley of Tears) and "An Phóg" (The Kiss), in this novel The Light-Bearer's Daughter.

== Track listing ==
No.	Title	Writer(s)	Length
1.	"Áilleacht"	Ní Uallacháin	4:49
2.	"An Phóg"	Ní Uallacháin	5:22
3.	"Cuimhne Chuailgne"	Ní Uallacháin	4:48
4.	"Cara Caoin"	Ní Uallacháin	4:31
5.	"Ór agus Síoda"	Ní Uallacháin	4:00
6.	"Spiorad Saor"	Ní Uallacháin	7:57
7.	"Siúl na Sí"	Ní Uallacháin	5:01
8.	"Cruit Dhubhróis"	Lyrics: 'Mis' (poem) by Biddy Jenkinson / Tune: Ní Uallacháin	2:10
9.	"Céad Slán, a Ghrá"	Ní Uallacháin	4:47
10.	"An Leannán"	Ní Uallacháin	5:35
11.	"Gleann na nDeor"	Ní Uallacháin	4:26

== Reception ==
Professional ratings
Review scores
Source	Rating
Journal of Music	favourable
The Irish Times	4/5 stars
Irish Music Magazine	favourable

Áilleacht received positive reviews in The Journal of Music, The Irish Times and Irish Music Magazine. Writing in The Journal of Music, poet Louis de Paor stated, "this is a deceptively sophisticated composition in which a profound emotional disturbance is articulated apparently without artifice, impressing itself on the listener as though it were actual and direct speech. It is a fitting conclusion to a substantial and deeply satisfying piece of work."

== Personnel ==
- Pádraigín Ní Uallacháin – vocals
- Brian Dunning – flute
- Iarla Ó Lionáird – vocals
- Steve Cooney – guitars
- Laoise Kelly – Irish harp
- Palle Mikkelborg – trumpet
- Helen Davies – harp
