= When I Was Young (album) =

Studio album by Len Graham Garry Ó Briain Pádraigín Ní Uallacháin
- Released: 1997
- Recorded: 1996–97
- Genre: Traditional Irish; Folk; Celtic
- Length: 68:48
- Label: Gael Linn

Pádraigín Ní Uallacháin chronology
An Dara Craiceann (1995)	When I Was Young (1997)	An Irish Lullaby (1999)

When I Was Young (or When I Was Young: Children's Songs from Ireland) is a collaboration between Irish musicians Len Graham, Garry Ó Briain and Pádraigín Ní Uallacháin. It is the third studio album from Ní Uallacháin, her second collaboration with Ó Briain, and Graham's eleventh studio album. The album was released on the Gael Linn label.

== Track listing ==
1. Johnny When You Die
2. Dazzledance
3. Soldier, Soldier
4. The Field Mouse's Ball
5. The Wheel of Fortune
6. As I Roved Out
7. The Fox & The Hare
8. Rosemary Fair
9. Early in the Morning
10. Henry My Son
11. Old Roger Rum
12. My Aunt Jane
13. Frost Is All over/Daisy Chain
14. The Magical Band
15. The Golden Ball
16. Do You Love an Apple
17. The Old Woman & The Beggar
18. Weelia Weelia Wallia
19. Cause He Was a Fool
20. The Willow Tree
21. Fair Rosa
22. I Once Had a Granny
23. Pack of Tailors/Baggy Britches
24. The Frog's Wedding
25. The False Knight
26. Dreamtime
27. Morning Willie
28. I Know Where I'm Going

== Personnel ==
- Len Graham – Arranger, Performer, Vocals
- Garry Ó Briain – Arranger, Guitar, Keyboards, Mandolin, Performer, Producer
- Pádraigín Ní Uallacháin – Arranger, Performer, Vocals
- Paul Brady – Liner Notes
- Ronan Browne – Flute, Pipe, Whistle (Instrument)
- Nollaig Casey – Fiddle, Viola
- Catherine Considine – Engineer
- Tom Hayes – Percussion
- Frances Lambe – Paintings
- Martin Murray – Mixing
- Máirtín O'Connor – Accordion
