= Irish music collecting =

Irish music collecting is an area concerned with preserving the large body of traditional Irish music. Collections have been gathered by individual collectors of Irish music as well as organisations such as the Irish Traditional Music Archive, which was formed in the 1980s.

== Early period ==
Very little Irish music composed before 1700 survives. Some airs from this period are preserved in manuscript, the Fitzwilliam Virginal Book being one of the more notable examples. A reference to Callen O Costure Me/Cailin O Chois tSuire Me in William Ballet's book of lute music in the late 16th century is the first known record of an Irish traditional song written in musical notation.

Irish traditional tunes were recorded in John Playford's The Dancing Master (mid 17th century), and Durfey's Pills to Purge Melancholy (late 17th century). In 1724, the first recorded collection of Irish traditional music, A Collection of the Most Celebrated Irish Tunes was published by John and William Neale of Christ Church Yard, Dublin. The only surviving original copy is now held by Edward Bunting at Queen's University Belfast. The Folk Music Society of Ireland published a facsimile edition in 1986, edited by Nicholas Carolan, and this was republished with additional notes and illustrations in 2010 by the Irish Traditional Music Archive in association with the Folk Music Society of Ireland.

The next collection was Wright's Aria di Camera (1730). It contained Scottish and Welsh airs borrowed from Neale without acknowledgment. The Burke Thumoth Collection (two volumes, 1750) contains many airs. The two Lee collections, the first from 1774, contain a collection of tunes by Rev. Jackson (d. 1798), a rector from Limerick. In 1780, John Lee published a collection of the compositions of Turlough O Carolan. In the appendix of Historical Memoirs of the Irish Bards (1786) by Joseph Cooper Walker there is a collection of 43 tunes.

In Scotland, Bryson published in 1790 A Curious Selection of Favourite Tunes with Variations, and it contains Fifty Favourite Irish Airs. In 1793, Cooke published a Selection of Twenty-one Favourite Original Irish Airs arranged for Pianoforte, Violin or Flute containing many tunes.

== Nineteenth century ==
Edward Bunting (1773–1843) collected tunes from the harpers at the Belfast Harp Festival. He made extensive collections of tunes which he published in The Ancient Music of Ireland. George Petrie (1790–1866) was an antiquarian, artist and important collector of Irish airs and melodies. John Edward Pigot (1822–1871) collected over 2,000 airs. Canon James Goodman (1828–1896), a Church of Ireland clergyman, collected over 2,000 tunes and songs, mainly from the south-west of the country.

== Sources ==
- Comhaltas Tre
- Tomas O Canainn: Traditional Music in Ireland (Routledge & Keegan Paul, 1978), ISBN 0-7100-0021-9
- Sean O Riada: Our Musical Heritage (The Dolmen Press, 1982), ISBN 0-85105-389-0
- Irish Music Centre, Boston College
