= An Dara Craiceann: Beneath The Surface =

An Dara Craiceann

Studio album by Pádraigín Ní Uallacháin
- Released: 1995
- Recorded: 1995
- Genre: Traditional Irish; Folk; Celtic
- Length: 50:43
- Label: Gael Linn (1995–2022); Ceoltaí Éireann (2023–)

Pádraigín Ní Uallacháin chronology
A Stór Is A Stóirín (1994)	An Dara Craiceann (1995)	When I Was Young (1995)

An Dara Craiceann (or An Dara Craiceann: Beneath The Surface 1995) is the second studio album by Irish singer Pádraigín Ní Uallacháin. The tracks on the album include 5 original airs composed by Ní Uallacháin and are a mixture of accompanied and unaccompanied songs, and one set of lyrics by Nuala Ní Dhomhnaill's poems.

== Track listing ==
1. "Ná tar ach san oíche" (Come only at night) (Composed P.Ní Uallacháin)
2. "Éireoidh mé amárach" (I will rise tomorrow)
3. "A Óganaigh Óig" (Young man) (Composed P.Ní Uallacháin)
4. "Nach aoibhinn don éanlaith" (How pleasant for the birds)
5. "Éirigh, a Shinéid" (Rise up Jane)
6. "Úirchill a' Chreagáin" (Creggan graveyard)
7. "An bád sí" (The fairy boat) (composed P.Ní Uallacháin
8. "Tá an oíche seo dorcha" (This night is dark)
9. "A bhean údaí thall" (Oh yonder woman)
10. "Tá daoine a' rá" (Some people say) (Composed P.Ní Uallachain)
11. "A Mhuire 's a Rí" (If I had fingers)
12. "An bhean chaointe" (The keening woman)
13. "Coillte glas a' Triúcha" (The green woods of Trugh)
14. "Tá sé in am domsa éirí" (It is time to rise)
15. "A chara dhílis" (My beloved friend) (Composed P. Ní Uallachain)

== Personnel ==
- Pádraigín Ní Uallacháin – Vocals, arranger, Liner Notes, Translation
- Jackie Daly – Accordion
- Jimmy Faulkner – Guitar
- Manus McGuire – Fiddle
- Seamus McGuire – Fiddle
- Martin Murray – Engineer, Mandolin
- Garry Ó Briain – Arranger, Guitar, Keyboards, Mandocello, Mandolin
- Adele O'Dwyer – Cello
- Frances Lambe – Artwork
