= Eithne Ní Uallacháin =

Irish singer

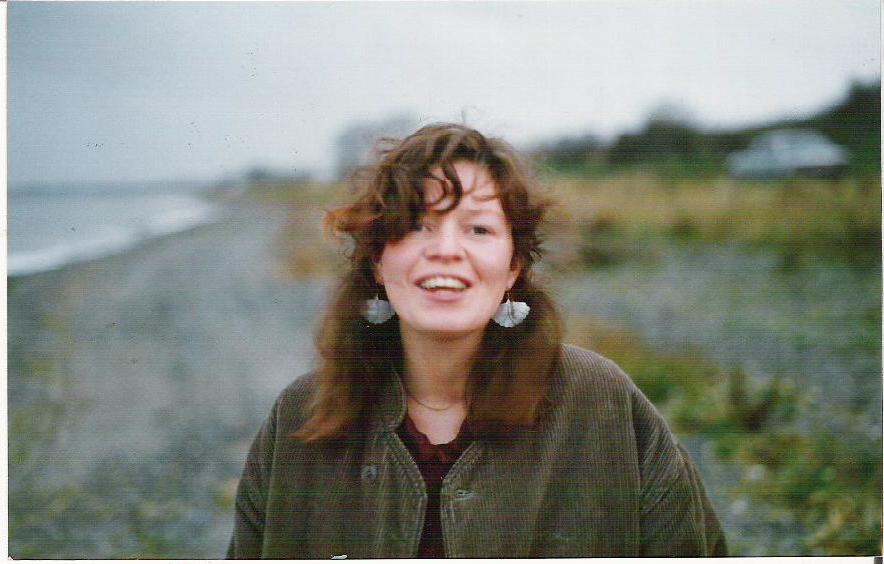
- Eithne, taken by her husband Gerry O'Connor

Background information
- Born: Eithne Carmel Ní Uallacháin; 10 January 1957; Ballina, County Mayo, Ireland
- Died: 19 May 1999 (aged 42) Carlingford, County Louth, Ireland
- Genres: Irish traditional Folk; Celtic music
- Occupations: Singer; Musician; Composer; Teacher
- Years active: 1983–1999
- Labels: Gael Linn; Sony Music; Lughnasa Music
- Website: www.eithneniuallachain.com

Eithne Ní Uallacháin (1 January 1957 – 19 May 1999) was an Irish singer, songwriter, and former teacher from County Louth, Ireland.

== Early life ==
Eithne was born in an Irish-speaking household to Pádraig Ó hUallacháin (1912-1974) and Eithne Bean Uí Uallacháin (née Ní Dhoibhlín). Her father, a teacher, writer and song collector published older songs from the Oriel area in local publications, and encouraged Eithne and her siblings to sing.

I was born into a passionate, intelligent family, whose passion for the Irish language, for literature and for learning, was the foundation stone on which all my music was based. My father’s love of song steered the course and purpose of my life.

— Eithne Ní Uallacháin, Tuairisc.ie

While at the University of Ulster in Coleraine, Eithne met fellow song enthusiasts such as Brian Mullen and Gary Hastings, with whom she would perform. Ní Uallacháin would visit home at weekends and in search of sessions would make contact with Gerry O'Connor, whom she would marry in 1978.

== Career ==
=== 1983–1990: Cosa Gan Bhróga and teaching ===
Eithne became a teacher in the 1980s at Gaelscoil Dhún Dealgan, an Irish-medium primary school in Dundalk, County Louth. In 1986, she collaborated with husband Gerry and Belfast flute player Desi Wilkinson in a recording for release on the Gael Linn label. 'Cosa Gan Bhróga' was engineered by Nicky Ryan and released in 1987. The album was subsequently remastered and reissued in 2013 by Gael Linn. While performing in La Chapelle-Neuve, Côtes-d'Armor, France, Eithne met Gilles le Bigot and approached him to record on her next album with Gerry.

=== 1991–1998: Lá Lugh ===
In 1991, Ní Uallacháin and O'Connor released their first album as a duo. 'Lá Lugh' (English: The Day of Lugh, inspired by Irish deity Lugh Lámhfhada) was released on Claddagh Records (Irish: Céirníní Cladaiġ). Eithne focused on songs from the Oriel region, scribed by collectors such as Lorcán Ó Muirí and Enrí Ó Muirgheasa and repertoire gathered from Antrim singer Len Graham, Armagh singer Sarah Makem and Donegal Gaeltacht singer Róise Bean Uí Ghrianna. The album was recorded in Randalstown, County Antrim by Shaun 'Mudd' Wallace, who would go on to engineer all of Eithne's subsequent recordings. Lá Lugh also saw the Eithne compose melodies to old Irish traditional songs. In 1993, she performed with Dan Ar Braz, and toured with Capercaillie in Germany.

Subsequent to the release of Lá Lugh, Eithne and Gerry formed a group of the same name. In 1995, the duo began recording their second album. The album was again recorded in Shaun 'Mudd' Wallace's Homestead Studios and focused on Eithne's songwriting and Gerry's fiddle playing. Brighid's Kiss was released under their own Lughnasa Music label that same year, featuring many of the same musicians as their previous album, along with two of their children, Dónal and Siubhán. The album was launched by Lá Lugh at The Great Northern Brewery, Dundalk.

Eithne's songs Brighid's Kiss and Tá Sé Ina Lá (inspired by the movement towards a Northern Ireland peace process) were well-received (and went on to be covered by numerous artists. See Artistry), and the two began television appearances and European tours with their extended band. Brighid's Kiss was awarded Album Of The Year by Irish Music Magazine in 1996.

Brighid's Kiss brought Lá Lugh to the attention of Sony Music, who signed the duo to the label. Before recording their next album, Lá Lugh toured throughout the European continent, including France, Denmark, Spain, Belgium, Germany, and the Netherlands. In 1998, Lá Lugh released Senex Puer, a new studio album with a number of re-recordings of Eithne's songs from Brighid's Kiss. The album was recorded with the same musicians as Brighid's Kiss, again at Wallace's studio in Randalstown.

=== 1998–present: Bilingua ===
In 1998, Eithne returned to Shaun 'Mudd' Wallace's Homestead studios to record a solo album. Ní Uallacháin's vocals were completed and much of the music was arranged, but the album was not released. Eithne took her own life 19 May 1999, following several bouts of illness. Eithne's grieving husband, Gerry O'Connor, could not return to work on the album and focused instead on raising his children and on touring to support the family. Their son, Dónal, took residence at Wallace's studio as an assistant engineer, and during times when the studio was not booked worked with Wallace on the album.

Due to contractual issues with the original record label, the album was not released until 2014, 15 years after its recording and 14 years after mixing and mastering had ended. The album was titled Bilingua, named after its title track. Bilingua was released with Gael Linn, who released Eithne's first album, Cosa Gan Bhróga. In preparation for its release, tributes were written by Capercaillie's Karen Matheson, Muireann Nic Amhlaoibh, Pauline Scanlon, Mary Black and Eithne's family and friends. Early reception to the album was overwhelmingly positive, with reviews appearing in English, Irish, French and Breton.

Bilingua was launched by Fintan Vallely at Odessa Club in Dame Court, Dublin on 3 December 2014.

=== Artistry ===
Eithne was known for her singing and flute playing and inspired a number of singers and musicians. On the release of Bilingua, tributes were sent by Muireann Nic Amhlaoibh, Karen Matheson, Maighread Ní Dhomhnaill, Pauline Scanlon, Mary Black and Irish artist Declan O'Mahony.

== Personal life ==
Eithne married fiddle player Gerry O'Connor in 1978. Together, they had four children, Dónal, Siubhán, Feilimí and Finnian. Eithne was a sister of singer and scholar Pádraigín Ní Uallacháin.

Eithne died by suicide on 19 May 1999. Her son Dónal continues to work with PIPS Ireland on suicide prevention projects. TG4 has since featured a biographical documentary on her life.

== Discography ==
- 2014 — Bilingua
- 1998 — Senex Puer
- 1996 — Brighid's Kiss
- 1992 — Lá Lugh
- 1987 — Cosa Gan Bhróga
