= Gerry O'Connor (fiddler) =

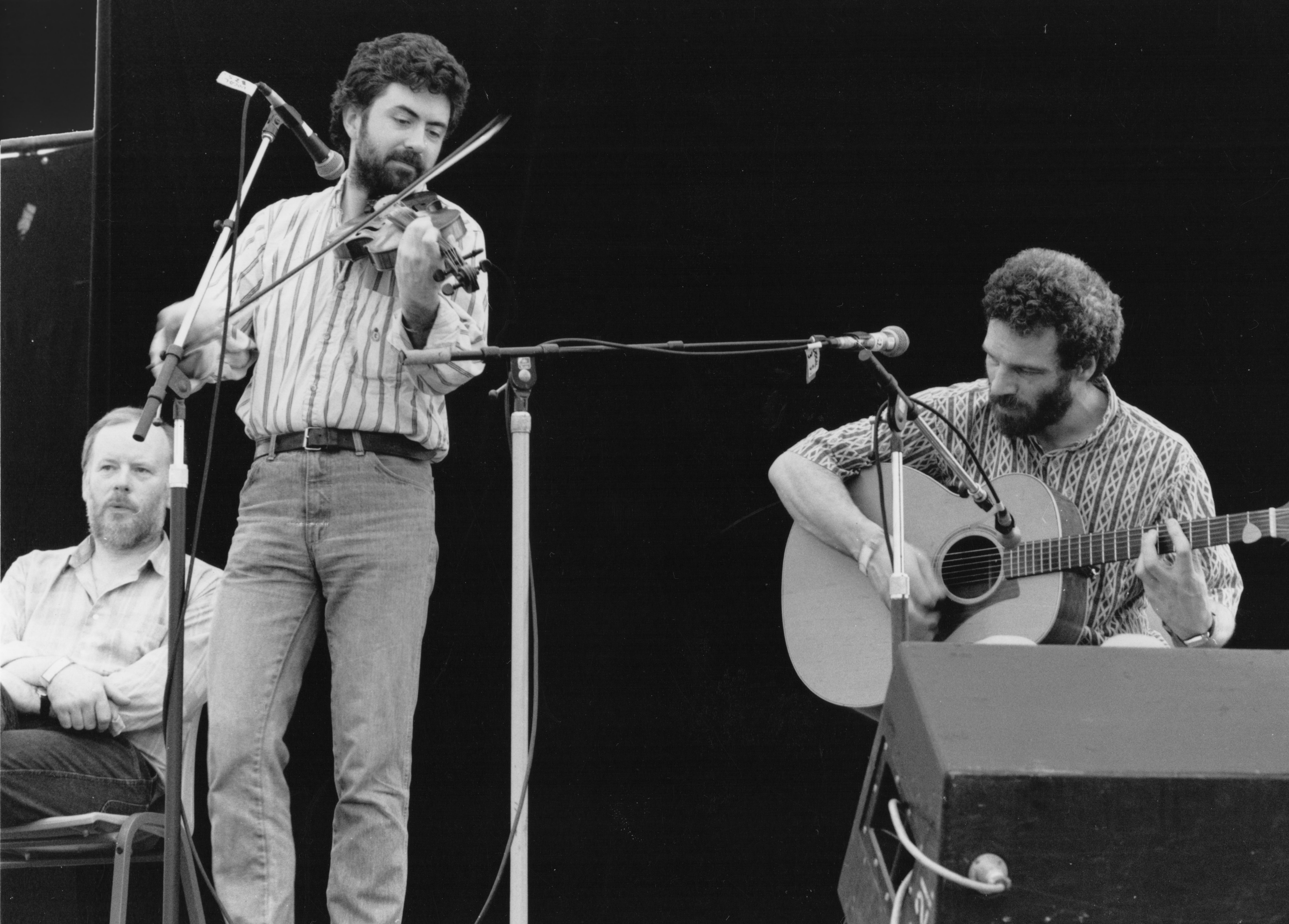
- O'Connor (centre) with "Skylark" on stage at the 1989 Port Fairy Folk Festival, Australia

Background information
- Born: Gerry O'Connor; Dundalk, County Louth, Ireland
- Genres: Irish traditional Folk; Celtic music
- Occupations: Musician, producer, composer, Music teacher
- Years active: 1983
- Labels: Lughnasa Music; Sony Music; Claddagh Records; Gael Linn
- Formerly of: The Irish Rovers
- Website: gerryoconnor.net

Gerry "Fiddle" O'Connor is a traditional Irish fiddle player, and founding member of bands, Skylark and La Lúgh. He tours as a solo fiddle player and performs with a variety of projects.

== Early life ==
O'Connor was born in Dundalk, County Louth, Ireland to Peter and Rose O'Connor, each musicians respectively. generation of musicians. Alongside his family, O'Connor learned to play the fiddle from his mother.

== Career ==
O'Connor later came under the influence of Sligo fiddler John Joe Gardiner. His performances concentrated on traditional Northeastern Irish music, some of which were recorded on his 2004 album, Journeyman.

From 2005 to 2010, O'Connor lectured in Traditional Music Performance at Dundalk Institute of Technology during which time he was awarded with MA by Research on the Dance Music of Oriel under the supervision of Dr Fintan Vallely. This research was published as The Rose in the Gap The Dance Music of Oriel in 2018 by Lughnasa Music. CCE awarded O'Connor the Gradam award in 2018 for his lifetime services to the traditional arts.

In addition to his solo performances and recordings, O'Connor is a founding member of three bands: Skylark (who have recorded four albums) and with Eithne Ní Uallacháin in La Lúgh (whose album Brighid's Kiss was voted album of the year in 1996 by readers of Irish Music Magazine). He has recently released album Oirialla with his new band featuring mostly unpublished Music and Song of South Ulster.

O'Connor has also toured and recorded with the Irish Baroque Orchestra and is the compiler and publisher of “I have Travelled this Country” a book with CD ROM documenting Cathal McConnell's Boys of the Lough collection of traditional song. With Breton Guitarist Gilles le Bigot This Irish / Breton duo recorded a live album In Concert in DZ (Douarananez) and have toured together each year since 2006. They toured together internationally.

In September 2013, O'Connor joined The Irish Rovers. for their "Farewell to Roving Tours of eastern Canada and USA. He continues touring with the band and was featured on all of their albums since 2011.

O'Connor is also a qualified violin maker and works as restorer and supplier of fine instruments when at home. He was Céilí band music consultant on the film Boys and Girls of County Clare and worked as a fiddle coach with Colm Meaney, Andrea Corr, Bernard Hill and Partick Bergin.

O'Connor also worked with Fintan Vallely on the development of Compánach, an audio visual intimate acoustic recital of music and song which interprets the nature, scope and quality of Irish Traditional music as described in the encyclopedia Companion to Irish Traditional Music. A double CD of the show was recorded to accompany the touring show.

== Personal life ==
O'Connor is married to fiddle player and chartered engineer, Síle Boylan. They have two young children.

Previously, O'Connor was married to the singer Eithne Ní Uallacháin from 1978 until she died in 1999. Their eldest son, Dónal is a fiddle player, producer and recording studio owner, and performs with At First Light and Ulaidh. Their daughter Siubhán is a lawyer with an international accounting firm and is a fiddle player and singer. Their second son Feilimí is a factual television director. He also plays guitar and sings. O'Connor and Eithne's third son Finnian is a uilleann piper and plays with The Mary Wallopers.

== Discography ==
Active Projects

- "Live in Oriel" with Gilles Le Bigot 2022 (Lughnasa Music LUGCD967)
- "Last Night's Joy" 2018 (Lughnasa Music LUGCD966)
- "Companach" (2018) Double CD of the audio visual show.
- Oirialla, 2011 (Lughnasa Music LUGCD965)
- Jig Away the Donkey, 2011 (Lughnasa Music LUGCD964) *
- White Raven: The Place where Life Began, 2006
- In Concert, with Gilles Le Bigot, 2005 (Lughnasa Music LUGCD963)
- Journeyman, 2004 (Lughnasa Music LUGCD962)
- "Merry Merry Time of Year", 2011 (The Irish Rovers IRD1111)

With Lá Lugh

- Bilingua, 2014 (Gael Linn)
- Senex Puer, 1998 (Sony Music Entertainment) Re-released on IML 2010
- Brighid's Kiss, 1996 (Lughnasa Music)
- Lá Lugh, 1991 (Claddagh Records) re-released 2011 on Lughnasa Music LUGCD960
- Cosa gan Bhróga, 1987( Gael Linn) released on CD 2012

With Skylark

- Raining Bicycles, 1996 (Claddagh Records)
- Light and Shade, 1992 (Claddagh Records)
- All of It, 1989 (Claddagh Records)
- Skylark, 1987 (Claddagh Records)

== Publications ==
- I have Travelled this Country; Songs of Cathal McConnell with DVD, 2011 (Lughnasa Music) with DVD of recordings of 123 songs
- The Rose in the Gap , Dance Music of Oriel from the Donnellan Collection 2018 (Lughnasa Music) ISBN 978-0-9511569-7-1 177pp

Other Albums

- Musita, 1987–94, 1995 (Ribium)
- The Celts Rise Again, 1990 (Green Linnet)
- Bringing it all back Home, 1991
- The Rough Guide to Irish Music, 1996 (World Music Network)
- Tacsí, 2000 (Vertical Records)
- Rogha Scoil Samhraidh Willie Clancy, 2008 (Oidhreacht an Chláir OAC-CD003, Selected)
- Songs and People of the Sea, 2009 (Greentrax Recordings)
