= Irish folk music (1500–1899) =

== Births and deaths ==
=== Births ===
- Francis O'Neill (1848–1936) Irish collector of tunes
- John J. Kimmel (1866–1942) Irish musician
- Elizabeth Cronin (1879–1956) Irish folk singer
- Michael Coleman (1891–1945) Irish fiddler
- James Morrison (1893–1947) Irish fiddler

== Collections of songs or music ==
- 1796 "General Collection of the Ancient Music of Ireland" by Edward Bunting (1773–1843)
- 1800 "Collection of National Irish Music for the Union Pipes" by O'Farrell
- 1831 "Irish Minstrelsy" by James Hardiman
- 1840s, 1850s "Manuscript Collection" by Canon James Goodman
- 1855 "Music of Ireland" by George Petrie

== See also ==
- List of Irish music collectors
