= Is acher in gaíth in-nocht =

Poem

"Is acher in gaíth in-nocht..." (Old Irish pronunciation: [is axʲəɾ inʲ ɣaːi̯θʲ iˈn̪oxt̪]) is an anonymous 9th-century poem in Old Irish.

The poem exists uniquely as a marginal entry in the Stiftsbibliothek MS 904 at the Abbey of St. Gallen in Switzerland, which is a copy of Priscian's Institutiones grammaticae, heavily glossed in Old Irish. It was most likely written in Ireland in the (mid-?) 9th century AD, when Viking attacks on Irish monasteries, schools and churches were a regular occurrence.

Irish singer and academic Pádraigín Ní Uallacháin arranged and recorded the poem in Copenhagen after visiting St. Gallen. It appears on her 2011 Songs of the Scribe studio album.

== Text ==
The text of the poem is as follows:

Old Irish	Old Irish pronunciation	Modern Irish 1	Modern Irish 2	Modern Scottish Gaelic	English
Is acher in gáith in nocht	is axʲər͉ in͈ ɡai̯θ iˈn͈oxt	Is athghéar an ghaoth anocht,	Is géar í an ghaoth anocht	Is acar (geur) a' ghaoth a-nochd	Bitter is the wind to-night
fu·fúasna fairggae findfholt;	fuˈfu͜asn͉a far͈ʲɡʲe fʲin͈d.ol͈t	craitear fionnfholt farraige:	suaitheann sí an fharraige fhionnfholt	a' luasgadh na fairge fionn-fhuilt	it tosses the ocean’s white hair
ní·ágor réimm Mora Minn	n͈ʲiː aːɣor͉ r͈ʲeːm͈ʲ mor͉a mʲin͈ʲdʲ	ní heagal theacht thar muir mhín	ní heagal liom cúrsa farraige chiúin	chan eagal rèim (seòladh) na mara mìn	I fear not the coursing of a clear sea
dond láechraid lainn úa Lothlind	don͈d l͉ai̯xr͉ɨðʲ l͉ɑn͈ʲ u͜a l͉ɑθʲl͉ʲin͈ʲdʲ	laochra fiáin na Lochlainne	ag laochra fiáine Lochlann	den laochraidh loinn o Lochlainn	by the fierce heroes from Lothlend (Norway).

== See also ==
- Early Medieval Ireland 800–1166
