= Robert Blake (dentist) =

Robert Blake (1772 – 25 March 1822) was an Irish dentist and notable figure in the field of dental science in Dublin. He graduated from the Department of Physics at the University of Edinburgh, Scotland, in September 1798, after initially training as a dentist under his uncle, Edward Hudson.

Blake married Ann Higgins, daughter of the physician and chemist Dr. Bryan Higgins, on 25 November 1799, at St. James's Church, Piccadilly, London.

Blake was for many years Secretary to the Physico-Medical Society of Dublin. He was the first State Dentist of Dublin, and had a large dental practice in the city.

The Freeman's Journal reports Blake's death thus:

"It is with deep regret that we announce to our readers the death of Dr Robert Blake of William Street. Those longest and best acquainted with this highly respected gentleman, feel his loss. Conspicuous as he has been for goodness of heart, integrity in all his dealings through life and genuine simplicity of manners."

== Published works ==
Blake's thesis, Disputatio medica inauguralis, de dentium formatione et structura in homine et in variis animalibus, was first published in Edinburgh in September, 1798. It was republished in Dublin in 1801 by William Porter, expanded and translated into English, under the title of An Essay on the Structure and Formation of the Teeth in Man and Various Animals. A revised and updated edition was published in 1851, featuring revisions and corrections, with notes by Cyreneus O. Cone.

In 1859, Nasmyth said of Blake's thesis:

"The essay of Dr. Blake must always be regarded as the best work on the subject of the period at which it was written, and will keep its place as a standard production. He is one of the few authors who have taken the trouble to read their lessons from nature, and the deductions which he has drawn from his observations are practically useful. His ideas respecting the 'crusta petrosa' were original at the time, and have since been generally acquiesced in; but his views on most of the functions of the dental capsule are similar to those entertained by other writers, and very different from the opinions which I shall have an opportunity of stating in the course of the present work. His remarks on the succession of the teeth of fishes are very accurate."

== Sources ==
- Cameron, Sir Charles A; (1886). History of the Royal College of Surgeons in Ireland, and of the Irish Schools of Medicine. Fannin & Company, 41 Grafton Street, Dublin.
- Nasmyth; (1859). Researches on the Development, Structure, and Diseases of the Teeth. Churchill, London.
