= Pádraigín Ní Uallacháin =

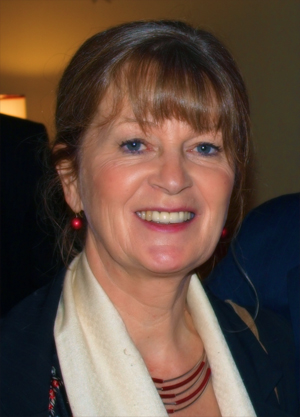
- Pádraigín in India in January 2009 for cultural events with poets Michael Longley and Ciaran Carson

Background information
- Born: Pádraigín Máire Ní Uallacháin; County Louth, Ireland
- Genres: Irish traditional Folk; Celtic music
- Occupations: Singer; Author; Academic; Composer
- Years active: 1994–present
- Labels: Gael Linn (1994–2005); Ceoltaí Éireann (2006 – present)
- Website: Official website www.orielarts.com Oriel Arts Project

Pádraigín Ní Uallacháin (/ˈpɔːdrɪɡiːn niː ˈuːləxɔːn/; Irish: [ˈpˠaːd̪ˠɾˠəɟiːnʲ n̠ʲiː ˈuəl̪ˠəxaːnˠ]) is an Irish singer, songwriter, and academic writer from Ireland.

== Early life ==
Pádraigín Ní Uallacháin was born into an Irish-speaking household in County Louth to Pádraig Ó hUallacháin and Eithne Devlin, from Cullyhanna, County Armagh. She is one of eight siblings, notably an elder sister of Eithne Ní Uallacháin (1957–1999). Their father, a teacher, writer and song collector collected older songs from the Oriel area and in Rannafast, and encouraged her and her siblings to sing. Her family childhood was spent in Ballina, County Mayo; in Ramelton & Carrigart, County Donegal, and in Dundalk, County Louth.

She attended St. Louis Secondary boarding school in County Monaghan before beginning a degree course at University College Dublin and University of Ulster. She received her doctorate in 2009 from the University of Ulster. She lived in Mullaghbawn, County Armagh, near her mother's native place of Cullyhanna, and now lives in Omeath, County Louth.

In 1977, Pádraigín was the first woman to read the news headlines in Irish at RTÉ, Ireland's national broadcaster. She also researched and presented numerous radio programmes in English and in Irish for RTÉ Radio.

She left RTÉ in 1980 to study for a master's degree in the University of Ulster and in 1984 began teaching in Dundalk, County Louth. She left teaching in 1999 to become a full-time professional musician.

== Career ==
=== 1994–1997: First recordings ===
In 1994, Pádraigín recorded her first full-length album with producer/musician Garry Ó Briain. A Stór is a Stóirín was released on the Gael Linn label and featured 36 songs for all ages. Britain's Channel 4 commissioned music videos of a number of songs on the album for a series Rí Rá. The videos later became regular features on TG4 between 1996 and 1998.

Pádraigín's composition Mullach a' tSí was recorded by Steve Vai on his 2012 album The Story of Light.

In 1995, Ní Uallacháin recorded her second album An Dara Craiceann: Beneath the Surface. It featured unaccompanied sean-nós songs and traditional songs set to her new compositions, including a work by Irish poet Nuala Ní Dhomhnaill. Later that year, she composed new pieces for the soundtrack of S4C's 1995 film Branwen.

Pádraigín's third album, When I Was Young, an album for children, was a collaboration between her, Garry Ó Briain and traditional singer Len Graham, which was released on the Gael Linn label in 1999 and later on Shanachie Records in the United States.

=== 1999–2010: Oriel, A Hidden Ulster and Áilleacht ===
From 1997 to 2012 Ní Uallacháin was a regular performer with the Danish composer/musician Palle Mikkelborg and harpist Helen Davies. She is the vocalist on Mikkleborg's soundtrack for the 1998 Goethe film Light, Darkness and Colors (1998) and on the title track of his album Song... Tread Lightly (2002). Her composition Don't give me the whole truth (Ná tar le hIomlán na Fírinne) is featured on Davies' 2002 album, Open The Door Softly.

Between 2003 and 2005, Ní Uallacháin began intensive research on songs from her native Oriel and recorded an album of restored Oriel songs, An Dealg Óir. Produced by Steve Cooney, it was released on Gael Linn in 2003 and features frequent collaborators Liam O'Flynn, Liam Ó Maonlaí Ódhrán Ó Casaide, Helen Davies, Máire Breatnach & Laoise Kelly. The song Éalaigh Liom (Elope with Me) was performed on BBC Two's Highland Sessions programme presented by Mary Ann Kennedy.

Her book, A Hidden Ulster: People, songs and traditions of Oriel was published 2004 by Four Courts Press, and later republished in 2021 by Ceoltaí Éireann.

A Hidden Ulster is a 540-page collection of rare songs, their histories, biographies of authors, collectors and scribes, and documentation of folk traditions in Oriel from the 17th century onwards. A radio series, Songs from A Hidden Ulster, was produced for RTÉ Radio 1, with further programmes around the book and its contents created for TG4, RTÉ1 and on BBC Radio. A Hidden Ulster was met with critical acclaim and featured in the Times Literary Supplement as a Book of the Year 2004 and Irish Times Books of the Year 2004 list. After the book's publication in 2003, Pádraigín was awarded Gradam Shean-Nós Cois Life in 2003 for her contribution to the Irish song tradition, and became the first traditional artist to be awarded a Major Arts Award from the Arts Council of Northern Ireland.

In 2005, A Hidden Ulster was shortlisted for the 2005 Michaelis-Jena Ratcliff Prize in Folklore and Folklife.

Following the publication, her work continued as the first woman to record an album of new compositions in Irish with Áilleacht (Beauty). The album was produced by long-term collaborator Steve Cooney and released in 2005. Collaborators Palle Mikkelborg, Helen Davies and featured Ní Uallacháin's composition from the album, An Leannán (The Beloved) on Masters of the Irish Harp in 2011.

As traditional singer in residence at the Seamus Heaney Centre for Poetry at Queen's University Belfast, Pádraigín collaborated with Colmcille and ULTACH Trust in creating series of events based around the exhibition of An Leabhar Mór (The Great Book of Gaelic), which was being exhibited in the Ulster Museum between October and November 2005.

Her work and life was the subject of the documentary, Spiorad Saor on RTÉ One in 2007, part of the Léargas series.

Ní Uallacháin received her doctorate from Ulster University in 2009.

=== 2011–2020: Return to recording and Oriel Arts Project ===
In November 2011, Pádraigín released her first album on the Ceoltaí Éireann label, Songs of the Scribe with early Irish lyrics and translations set to her new compositions and accompanied by harpist Helen Davies. Ní Uallacháin collaborated with poets Ciaran Carson and Seamus Heaney by setting to music song-poems from ancient Irish manuscripts, written by Irish scribes and scribe-poets. To record the album, Pádraigín travelled to St. Gallen, Switzerland to read the Irish manuscripts. Songs of the Scribe was recorded in Copenhagen and remained on the Celtic Note album charts for seven months between March and September 2012. In 2014, Ní Uallacháin performed songs for the On Home Ground Seamus Heaney festival in Magherafelt.

Pádraigín's third children's album, Let the Fairies In, was released in September 2012 and was produced by Dónal O'Connor.

In 2017, the Oriel Arts Project was launched. Funded by the Arts Council of Ireland, it is a digital reclamation and restoration of a song and music tradition which had almost died out in Oriel, and where most of the song lyrics had lost their respective musics. Ní Uallacháin was author, editor and director or the project, and researched, edited texts and re-coupled of lyrics and music as part of the project and recorded the songs. To coincide with the project's launch, Pádraigín released Ceoltaí Oirialla, a double album of Oriel songs. The recording is divided between a cappella and accompanied songs.

Pádraigín's work was acknowledged at the national 2018 Gradam Ceoil TG4 awards at the Waterfront Hall in Belfast. She received the Outstanding Contribution to Traditional Music award and performed ‘Séamus Mac Murfaidh’ (with her local protégés, Blaithín Mhic Cana and Piaras Ó Lorcáin), and her own composition, ‘Gleann na nDeor’ (with The Voice Squad) at the ceremony.

Between 2015 and 2019, Ní Uallacháin was director of the annual Éigse Oirialla festival in Carlingford, County Louth. The programme consisted of concerts, lectures, readings and discussions on Oriel and the region's music.

In 2019, a second documentary on her work was broadcast on TG4, "Sé Mo Laoch".

=== 2024 – present: Seven Daughters of the Sea CD and research ===
In 2022, she contributed a keening song to the soundtrack of John Connors' film The Black Guelph, which details the generational abuse suffered by Irish travellers at the hands of the state and church.

In January 2024, Ní Uallacháin released of her tenth studio album. Seven Daughters of the Sea. Longstanding collaborators Dónal O'Connor and Steve Cooney returned respectively as producer and guitarist. The album also sees Ní Uallacháin collaborate again with guitarist Steve Vai on the title track, and with Indian classical flautist Rajat Prasanna. It also features Fin Moore on pipes and Macdara ó Graham on vocal drones and overtones.

Her research continues on the songs of County Leitrim collected by William Forde in the nineteenth century, and further research and recordings on the songs and singers of Omeath, County Louth, due for publication 202728. She is also editing a major collection of 390 songs from The Len Graham Collection Field Recordings. It is due for publication Spring 2027.

== Artistry ==
Ní Uallacháin has collaborated throughout her career with Garry Ó Biain, Steve Cooney, Dónal O'Connor, Helen Davies and Máire Breatnach. She has also composed settings for numerous poems by contemporary Irish poets Nuala Ní Dhomhnaill, Biddy Jenkinson, Ciaran Carson and Seamus Heaney, aside from her settings of poetry by William Butler Yeats and early Irish and bardic poems.

Ní Uallacháin's albums are diverse in genre. She has recorded albums of children's music, new composition in, or set to words in, Irish, English, old Irish and Scottish Gaelic. She has recorded contemporary and sean-nós albums, both with and without accompaniment and has incorporated contemporary jazz and rock music and Indian chant into other recordings, most notably Áilleacht and Songs of the Scribe.

Pádraigín's song compositions have been recorded by Dolores Keane, Muireann Nic Amhlaoibh, Danú, The Black Family, Eithne Ní Uallacháin, Len Graham, Skylark, Mairéad Ní Mhaonaigh, Altan, Steve Vai, Nuala Kennedy, Cathie Ryan and Hal Leonard Concert Band.

She studied chant with Jill Purce in the United Kingdom, Ritwik Sanyal in India, Silvia Nakkach in Auroville, India.

== Awards and recognition ==
- 2003 – Gradam Shean-nós Cois Life.
- 2004 – Major Arts Award, Arts Council of Northern Ireland and the Cultural Relations Commission (the first traditional musician to receive the award).
- 2004 – Book of the Year, Times Literary Supplement for A Hidden Ulster: people, songs and traditions of Oriel
- 2004 – Irish Times Book of the Year, Irish Times for A Hidden Ulster
- 2005 – Michaelis-Jena Ratcliff Prize shortlist
- 2009 – Doctorate, Ulster University
- 2018 – Outstanding Contribution to Traditional Music, Gradam Ceoil TG4.
- 2018 – Mná an Mhisnigh (Women of Courage) Award
- 2018 – Bliain na Gaeilge, Conradh na Gaeilge
- 2018 – Cultural Achievement Award, Mullaghbawn GAA
- 2018 – Civic Award, Newry, Mourne and Down District Council (for ‘contribution to local culture’)
- 2018 – Creative Arts Award, Fiddler's Green International Folk Festival
- 2018 - Gradam TG4 for 'Outstanding Contribution to Traditional Music'
- 2019 Sé Mo Laoch - documentary TG4
- 2022 Major Arts Council/ An Chomhairle Ealaíon Award for online cultural resource www.orielarts.com

=== Residencies ===
- 2005 – 2013 Traditional Singer in Residence, Seamus Heaney Centre for Poetry at Queens University Belfast (appointment)
- Dundalk Institute of Technology (directorship of Dr. Eilish Farrell)
- The Glens Arts Centre, Manorhamilton, County Leitrim.
- Fellowship, Royal Literary Fund based at St Mary's University College, Belfast and Queens University Belfast (first recipient of an Irish language fellowship)

== Personal life ==
Pádraigín Ní Uallacháin has two sons, Eoghan Graham and Macdara Jewellery. She is a sister of singer Eithne Ní Uallacháin and aunt to Dónal O'Connor (musician and producer), film director Feilimí O'Connor and Uilleann piper Finnian Ó Connor.

== Discography ==
- 1994 – A Stór Is A Stóirín
- 1995 – An Dara Craiceann
- 1997 – When I Was Young
- 1999 – An Irish Lullaby
- 2002 – An Dealg Óir
- 2005 – Áilleacht
- 2011 – Songs of the Scribe
- 2012 – Let the Fairies In
- 2017 – Ceoltaí Oirialla
- 2024 – Seven Daughters of the Sea

== Bibliography ==
- 2003 – Ní Uallacháin, Pádraigín, A Hidden Ulster: People, songs and traditions of Oriel, Four Courts Press
