= Songs of the Scribe =

Studio album by Pádraigín Ní Uallacháin
- Released: 3 December 2011
- Recorded: My Room Studios; Copenhagen, Denmark
- Genre: Traditional Irish; Folk; Celtic
- Length: 45:20
- Label: Ceoltaí Éireann
- Producer: Thomas Li, Pádraigín Ní Uallacháin, Helen Davies

Pádraigín Ní Uallacháin chronology
Áilleacht (2005)	Songs of the Scribe (2011)	Let the Fairies In (2012)

Album reviews
Review scores
Source	Rating
Journal of Music	favourable
RTÉ Raidió na Gaeltachta	favourable
Argus	favourable
Lonely Planet	favourable
The Irish Times	4/4 stars
Lonely Planet	favourable

Songs of the Scribe is the seventh studio album from Irish singer Pádraigín Ní Uallacháin, who is also Traditional Singer in Residence at the Seamus Heaney Centre For Poetry at Queen's University, Belfast. Released on 3 December 2011, the album features old and newly written translations by Ní Uallacháin, Ciaran Carson and Seamus Heaney and harp accompaniment by Helen Davies. Recorded in Copenhagen, Denmark, Songs of the Scribe was inspired by the manuscripts held in the library of St. Gallen. Pádraigín visited the library to research the manuscripts, carried to safety from Viking attack by St. Gall and others from Bangor, County Down to Europe over a number of centuries.

== Track listing ==
No.	Title	Writer(s)	Length
1.	"The Hermit's Wish (Dúthracar, a maic Dé bí)"	9th-century scribe; Ní Uallacháin; Often attributed to Manchán mac Silláin; 6th/7th century	7:49
2.	"The Blackbird of Belfast Lough (Int én bec)"	9th-century scribe; Carson; Heaney	3:42
3.	"The Scribe in the Woods (Dom fharcaí fidbaide fál)"	9th-century scribe; Carson	3:30
4.	"Líadan's Lament (Mé Líadan ro-carus-sa Cuirithir)"	9th-century scribe; Ní Uallacháin	6:15
5.	"The Land of Stars (A Bé find in rega lem)"	9th-century scribe; Ní Uallacháin	4:41
6.	"The Wind Is Wild Tonight (Is acher in gaíth in-nocht)"	9th-century scribe; Ní Uallacháin	3:14
7.	"Incantation of Amergin (Am gaith ar muir)"	Amergin, 11th-century mystical poet; Ní Uallacháin	5:32
8.	"Pangur Bán"	9th-century scribe; Heaney	2:21
9.	"My Hand is Cramped with Penwork (Is scith mo chrob)"	Colmcille; 12th-century scribe; Heaney	2:12
10.	"My Mind's Desire (Ropo mian dom menmainse)"	11th-century scribe; Ní Uallacháin	6:01

== Personnel ==
- Pádraigín Ní Uallacháin – vocals, drones, bells
- Helen Davies – Irish harp, wire-strung harp, monochords, Tibetan bowl
- Thomas Li – recording/mixing

== Release history ==
Country	Release date
Ireland	December 3, 2011
UK	December 3, 2011
