= Máirtín O'Connor =

Irish musician

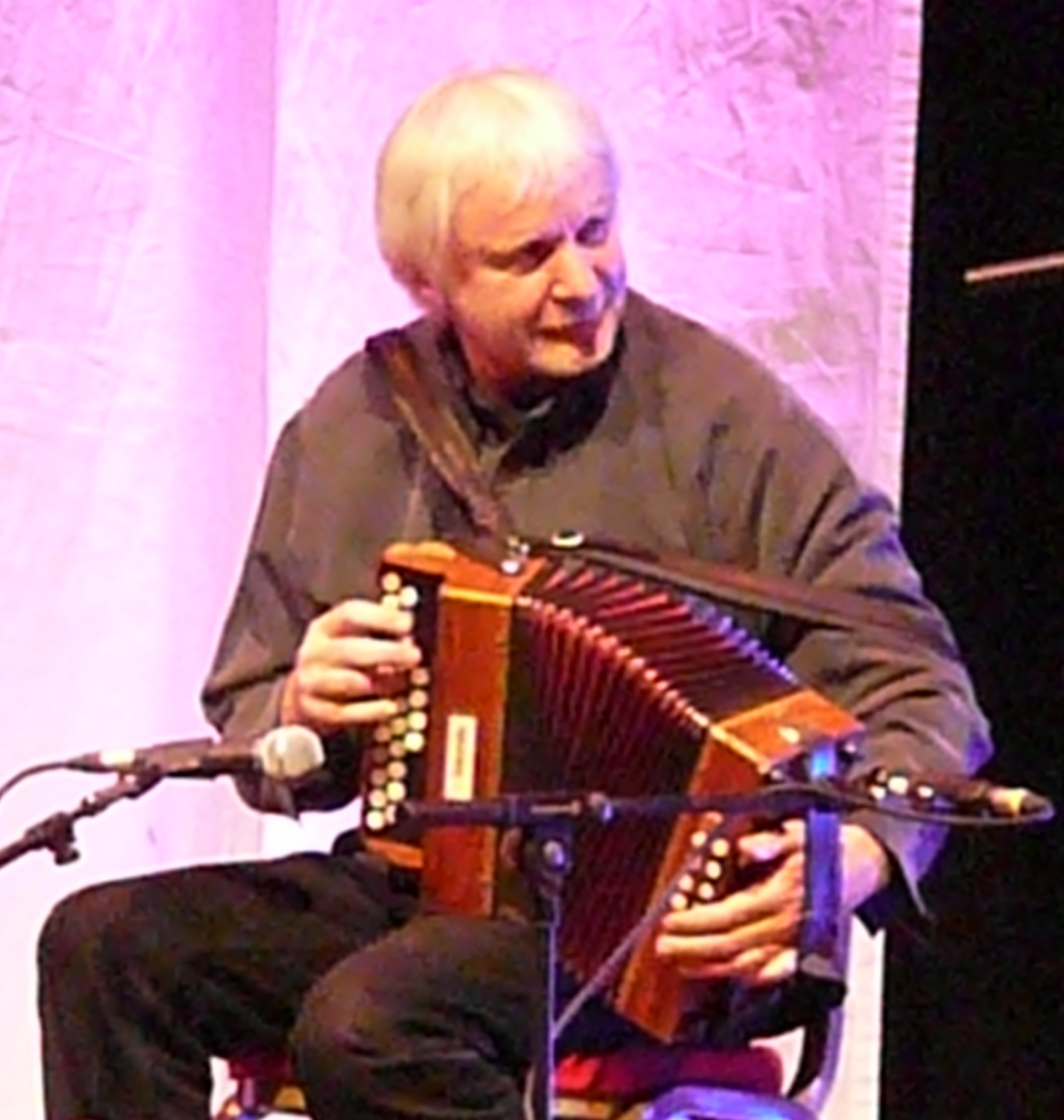
- O'Connor backing Cara Dillon at the 2012 Bristol Folk Festival

Background information
- Born: Galway, Ireland
- Occupation: Musician
- Instrument: Accordion

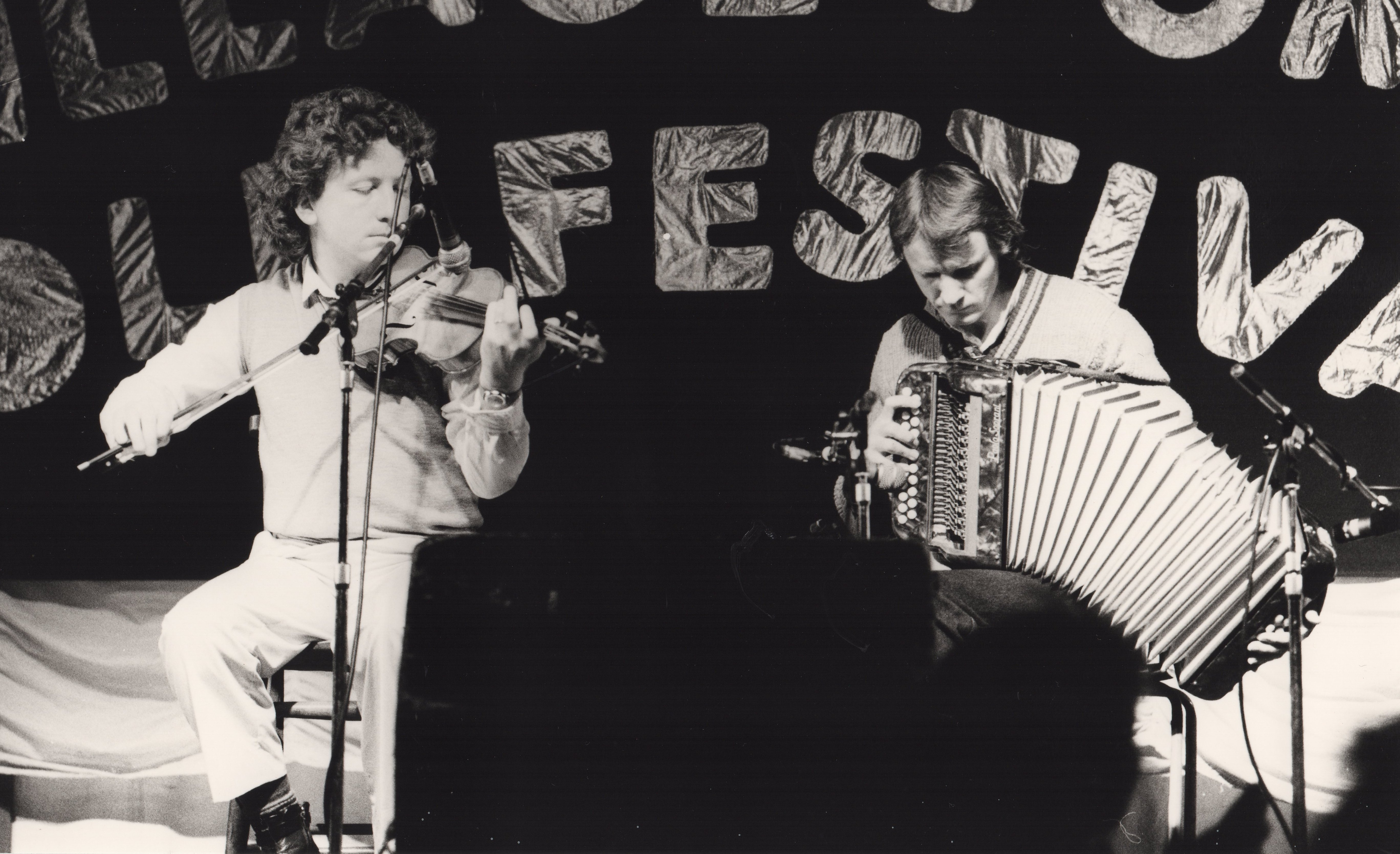
O'Connor (right) with Frankie Gavin, on stage with De Dannan at the 1985 Trowbridge Folk Festival

Máirtín O'Connor is an Irish button accordionist from Galway, Ireland, who began playing at the age of nine, and whose career has seen him as a member of many traditional music groups that include Skylark, Midnight Well, De Dannan, and The Boys of the Lough. A traditional Irish musician, O'Connor was one of the major forces of the music in Riverdance.

His first solo album The Connachtman's Rambles established him as a solo musician and proved a major critical success. O'Connor has released four albums since: Perpetual Motion, Chatterbox, The Road West and Rain Of Light.

== Discography ==
=== Solo work ===
- The Connachtman's Rambles (1979)
- Perpetual Motion (1990)
- Chatterbox (1993)
- The Road West (2001)
- Rain Of Light (2003)

=== With others ===
- EastWind (1992)
- Crossroads with Cathal Hayden and Seamie O'Dowd (2008)
- Going Places with Cathal Hayden and Seamie O'Dowd, as Máirtín O'Connor Band (2011)
- Zoë Conway, Dónal Lunny and Máirtín O' Connor 2016

=== Session work ===
- A Stór Is A Stóirín (1994)
- Riverdance: Music from the Show (1995)
- When I Was Young (1997)
- Fis Carolan's Dream (Garry O'Briain) (1998)
