= A Stór Is A Stóirín =

Studio album by Pádraigín Ní Uallacháin
- Released: 1994
- Recorded: 1994
- Genre: Traditional Irish; Folk; Celtic
- Length: 1h 11m 16s (total for both CDs)
- Label: Gael Linn (1994–2022); Ceoltaí Éireann (2023–)

Pádraigín Ní Uallacháin chronology
| A Stór Is A Stóirín (1994) | An Dara Craiceann (1995) |

Professional ratings
Review scores
| Source | Rating |
|---|---|
| Hot Press | favourable |

A Stór Is A Stóirín (or A Stór Is A Stóirín: Songs For All Ages) is a studio album by Irish singer Pádraigín Ní Uallacháin with Garry Ó Briain. The album spawned various television and radio appearances for Ní Uallacháin in Ireland and in Britain.

== Track listing ==
CD 1 – A Stór

1. 'S Umbó Aerá
2. Mo Chailín Rua
3. Níl 'na Lá
4. Casadh Cam na Feadarnaí
5. Dúlamán
6. Mál Bhán
7. A Stór A Stór, A Ghrá
8. Séarlas Óg
9. Sí Do Mhamó Í
10. Bó Na Leathadhairce
11. Gabhaim Molta Bríde
12. Scadán Amháin
13. Ó Boró Braindí Braindí
14. Mullach a' tSí
15. Fuígfidh Mise An Baile Seo
16. Téir Abhaile 'Riú
17. Amhrán Na Bealtaine
18. Mo Ghile Mear

CD 2 – A Stóirín – For Children

1. Tá Dhá Ghabhairín Bhuí Agam
2. Suáilcí Samhailcí
3. Tairse Abhaile, A Mháirín Ó
4. Suantraí Hiúdaí
5. Nead Na Lachan
6. An Leanbh Nua
7. Nóra Bheag
8. Láirín Ó Lúrtha
9. Carúl Na Nollag
10. Seoithín Agus Seoithín
11. Deandraimín Dílis
12. Péigín Leitir Móir
13. Cuirfimid Deaindí Deaindí
14. Mo Bhuachaillín Ceanasach
15. Bog Braon
16. Turas Go Gaillimh
17. An bhFaca Tú Mo Shéamaisín?
18. Peata Beag do Mháthar

== Personnel ==
- Pádraigín Ní Uallacháin – vocals
- Gráinne Ní Uallacháin – vocals
- Len Graham – vocals
- Nollaig Casey – fiddle, viola
- Cathal McConnell – flute, tinwhistle
- Máirtín O'Connor – accordion
- Martin Murray – mandolin
- Ruairí Ó hUallacháin – tinwhistle, uilleann pipes
- Garry Ó Briain – guitar, mandocello, keyboards
- Tommy Hayes – percussion

== Release history ==
A Stór Is A Stóirín was released by Gael Linn in 1994, 2004, 2008 and 2012.
