= Edward Hudson (dentist) =

Edward Hudson (1743 – 4 October 1821) was an Irish dentist, born in Castlemartyr, County Cork, Ireland.

== Biography ==
Hudson was an eminent dentist, at a time when dentistry was still very much a fledgling practice. He created a "Preservative and other Dentifrices" for the bettering of dental hygiene during his time as a dentist.

Edward Hudson lived and practiced in Grafton Street, Dublin, and latterly lived at The Hermitage in Rathfarnham, Dublin (known in Edward Hudson's time as "Fields of Odin", and subsequently as "St. Enda's"). This building, on the outskirts of Dublin, is now the home of the Pearse Museum, which celebrates the life of Patrick Pearse.

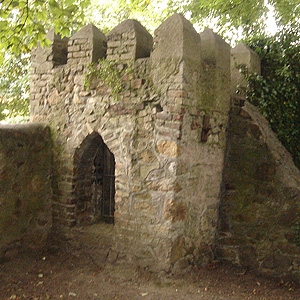
Watch Tower, St Enda's Park, Rathfarnham, Dublin

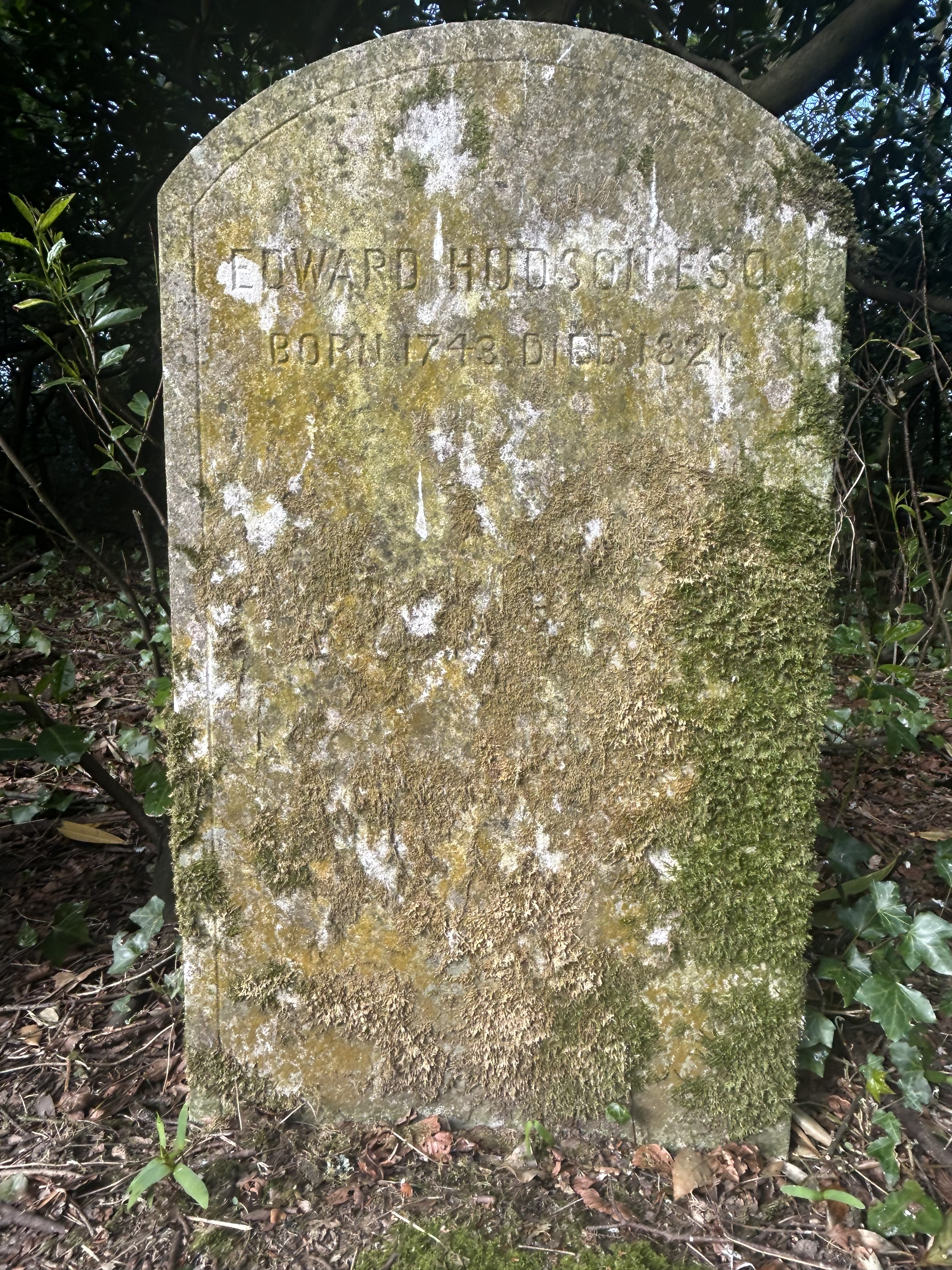
Gravestone of Edward Hudson (1743-1821)

During his time at The Hermitage, Hudson built several ruins along the edge of the grounds, which remain to this day. The ruins were deliberately built as such from new, using rough stone to create the impression that they had existed for many years. These include a small watchtower, a hermit's cave, a dolmen and a ruined abbey.

Amongst other vocations, Hudson was a director of the Grand Canal of Ireland, a scientific experimenter and philosopher, and a publisher of several anonymous scientific and political treatises.

Hudson was the uncle of Robert Blake, the first State Dentist of Ireland, who was inspired to become a Dentist by his uncle. Edward Hudson's son Henry Philerin Hudson subsequently succeeded Blake as State Dentist.

In addition to his residences in Dublin, Hudson also owned The Manor in Glenville, County Cork, which he purchased sometime between 1776 and 1788. Edward Hudson is buried in the graveyard of St. Mary's Church in Glenville in County Cork, along with other members of the Hudson family including his son Henry Philerin Hudson, the composer and collector of ancient Irish music.

It was Hudson's wish that when buried, his grave in the small churchyard at Glenville would be covered by:

"a hollow cone or Pyramid [...] for the purporse of performing therein my invented experiments on the Pendulum for elucidating the Phenomena and motions of Comets, Planets and Satellites; also my new theory of the Pendulum and that of falling bodies & many other things [...]"

Such a cone was never built, and the £500 left for this purpose must have gone to an alternative use.

== Published works ==
- Hudson, Edward (anonymous — dedication signed "A Patrician"; (1788). Ode on St Cecilia’s Birthday, J. Jones, Dublin.
