= Henry Philerin Hudson =

Irish composer and scholar (1798–1889)

Henry Philerin Hudson (23 March 1798 – 6 January 1889) was an Irish composer, folk song collector and scholar.

== Life ==
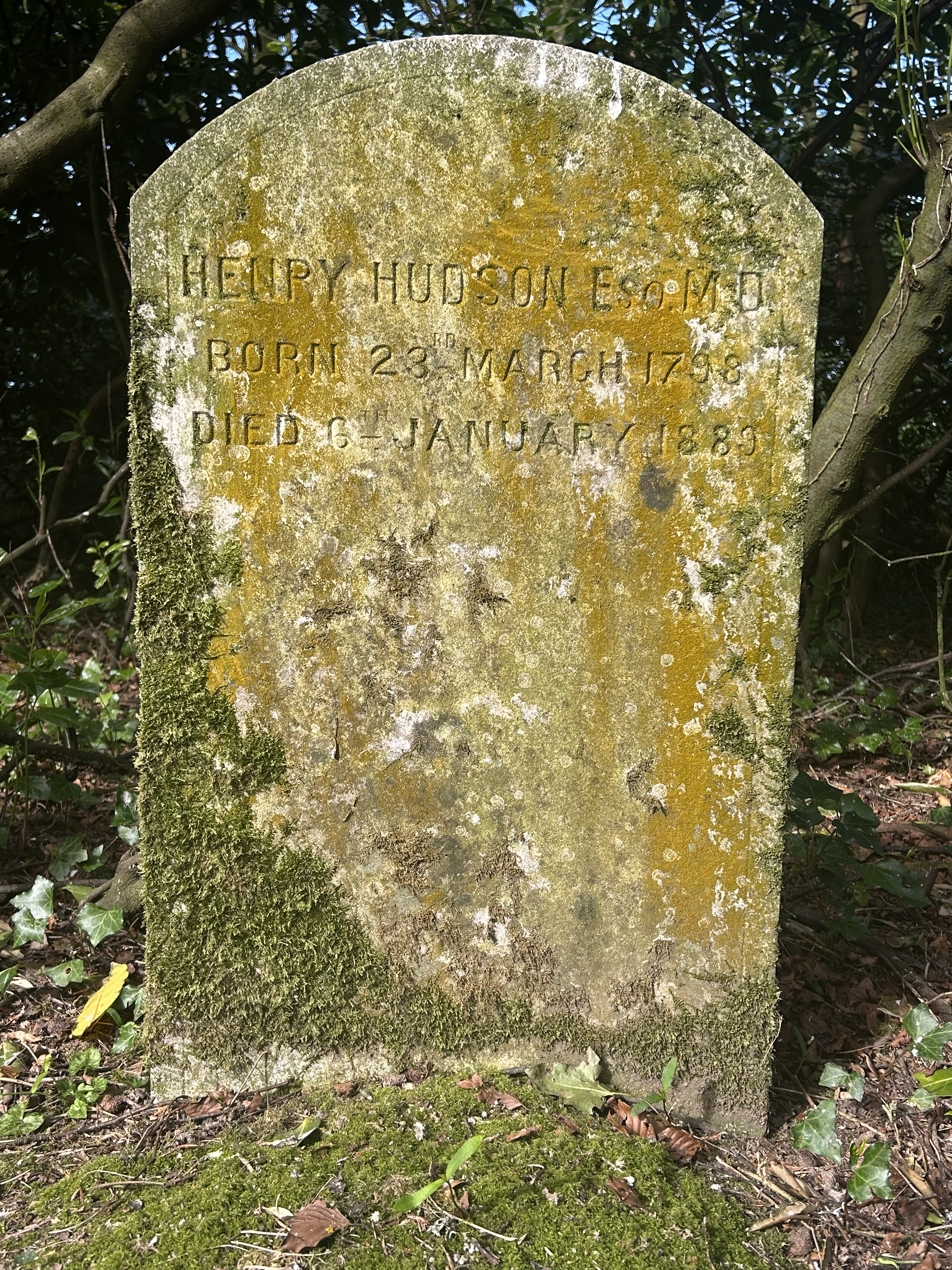
Gravestone of Henry Hudson (1798-1889)

Born at The Hermitage (now St Enda's), Rathfarnham, Dublin, Hudson was the son of the eminent dentist, Edward Hudson, and has also practiced as dental surgeon on Grafton Street, Dublin. He was involved with Dublin musical societies including the Anacreontic Society, the Philharmonic Society, and the Metropolitan Choral Society. He was also a council member of the Society for the Preservation and Publication of the Melodies of Ireland and was elected Member of the Royal Irish Academy (RIA).

== Folk song collector ==
At the age of 14, Hudson transcribed the music manuscripts of Irish language teacher and lexicographer Edward O'Reilly (1765–1830). However, little was added to his collection until around 1840. His interest in Irish traditional music was rekindled by a statement by collector Edward Bunting (1773–1843) to the effect that no newly composed tunes sounded characteristic of the Irish style. Hudson felt that he and others could compose melodies that sounded traditional, and he began to compose sample pieces.

Between 1841 and 1843 he edited the music section of the literary magazine The Citizen, publishing 106 tunes from his own collection. Many of the tunes he published were his own compositions but were presented as traditional melodies and given a false provenance to back them up. Hudson felt vindicated when he heard that Bunting had expressed some jealousy towards Hudson's published airs. Henry Hudson never publicly admitted to his deceit, and several of his compositions appear as traditional melodies in the manuscripts and publications of other collectors.

His collection numbered 870 melodies at the time of his death. In 1901, the various volumes of his manuscript collection were privately sold, though it is now publicly available at the National Library of Ireland, the Boston Public Library, and the University of Notre Dame, Indiana.

Henry's brother William Elliott Hudson (1796–1853) was also a collector of Irish folk songs and a more prolific composer.

Henry Philerin Hudson is buried in the graveyard of St. Mary's Church in Glenville, County Cork.

== Composer ==
Besides pseudo-traditional melodies, Hudson also composed original songs and piano music. The National Library of Ireland possesses a volume of 30 songs in English and another with 20 songs to German words. He also collaborated with Vincent Novello in an English version of Beethoven's Christ on the Mount of Olives (Christus am Ölberge), published in Boston in 1853.

== Bibliography ==
- Jimmy O'Brien Moran: "Henry Philerin Hudson, MRIA: an Irish Macpherson?", in: Béaloideas vol. 81 (2013), pp. 150–169.

== See also ==
- Irish folk music (1500–1899)
