= An Irish Lullaby =

When I Was Young

Studio album by Pádraigín Ní Uallacháin
- Released: 1999
- Recorded: 1998–99
- Genre: Traditional Irish; Folk; Celtic
- Length: 50:58
- Language: Irish, English
- Label: Shanachie Records (1999–2022); Ceoltaí Éireann (2023–)
- Producer: Máire Breatnach

Pádraigín Ní Uallacháin chronology
When I Was Young (1995)	When I Was Young (1999)	An Dealg Óir (2002)

An Irish Lullaby (or Suantraí: An Irish Lullaby) is the fourth studio album from Irish singer Pádraigín Ní Uallacháin. The album was released on the Shanachie Records label in the United States.

== Track listing ==
1. "The Sleeping Lovers"
2. "Bí Im' Aice"
3. "The Willow Tree"
4. "The Gypsy Lullaby"
5. "Suantraí Sí"
6. "Suantraí Samhraidh"
7. "Eithne's Lullaby"
8. "As Darkness Follows Day"
9. "The Magical Band"
10. "Suantraí na Mná Sí"
11. "Mullach a' tSí"
12. "Still By Your Side"
13. "Suantraí Hiúdaí"
14. "Connemara Lullaby"
15. "Hó a Bhá-in"

== Personnel ==
- Pádraigín Ní Uallacháin – Vocals, Composer
- Máire Breatnach – Producer
- Alan Whelan – Engineer
