= Seven Daughters of the Sea =

Seven Daughters of the Sea - Seacht nIníon na Mara

Studio album by Pádraigín Ní Uallacháin
- Released: 2024
- Recorded: 2021–2023
- Studio: RedBox Recording, Belfast
- Genre: Traditional Irish; Folk; Celtic; Indian
- Length: 48:00
- Label: Ceoltaí Éireann
- Producer: Dónal O'Connor

Pádraigín Ní Uallacháin chronology
Ceoltaí Oirialla (2017)	Seven Daughters of the Sea - Seacht nIníon na Mara (2024)

Seven Daughters of the Sea - Seacht nIníon na Mara (or Seven Daughters of the Sea) is the tenth studio album from Irish singer Pádraigín Ní Uallacháin. Released January 2024.

== Track listing ==
No.	Title	Writer(s)	Length
1.	"Mórmháthair"	Pádraigín Ní Uallacháin	3:37
2.	"Imbolc"	Ní Uallacháin	4:10
3.	"Samhradh Buí"	Ní Uallacháin	4:50
4.	"Londubh an Cheoil"	Ní Uallacháin	5:20
5.	"Beannú"	Ní Uallacháin	4:20
6.	"Mian mo Chroí"	Ní Uallacháin	5:54
7.	"Seven Daughters of the Sea"	Ní Uallacháin	5:33
8.	"Caoineadh Cine"	Ní Uallacháin; Traditional	4:59
9.	"Colm Bán na Síochana"	Ní Uallacháin	4:27
10.	"Brigid Buach"	Ní Uallacháin	4:29

== Personnel ==
=== Musicians ===
- Pádraigín Ní Uallacháin: vocals, composer
- Steve Cooney: Steel string, nylon string, high string, fretless bass
- Rajat Prasanna: Bansuri
- Dónal O'Connor: Fiddle, viola, keyboards, guitar, programming
- Steve Vai: Electric guitar
- Macdara Ó Graham: Vocal drones, overtones
- Fin Moore: Reel pipes, small pipes

=== Technical ===
- Producer: Dónal O'Connor
- Artistic director: Pádraigín Ní Uallacháin
- Recording: RedBox Studios, Dundalk & Belfast
- Mastering: Cormac O'Kane, RedBox Studios
- Mixing: Dónal O'Connor, Alastair McMillan (track 7)
- Graphic design: Tonic Design, Belfast
- Cover painting: Petra Berntsson 'Breathing Change', 2023
