= Helsinki Folk Festival =

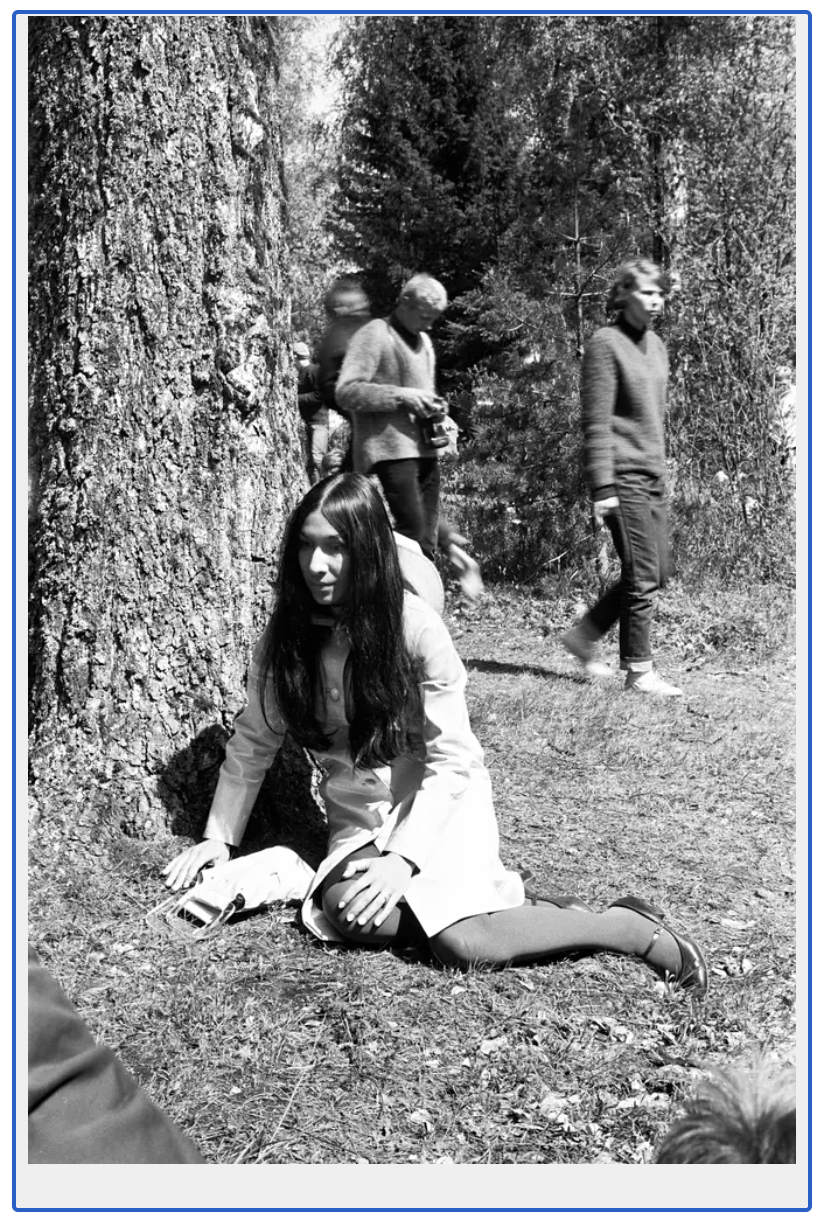
Buffy Sainte-Marie in Sandvik in 1966.

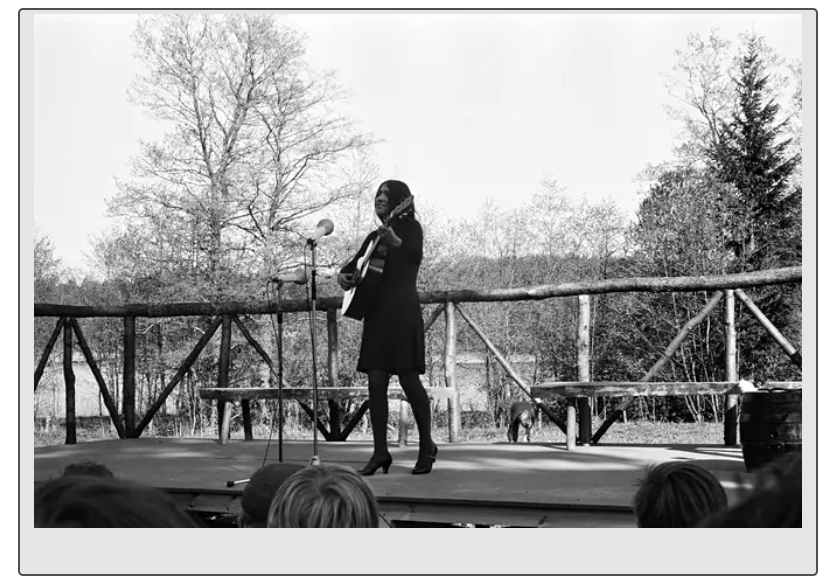
Buffy Sainte-Marie performing in Sandvik in 1966.

The Helsinki Folk Festival was a festival arranged during the Pentecost of 1966 (29–30 May) in Sandvik, Espoo, Finland. It was the first-ever festival of popular music in Finland, and apparently a one-off event. The first Pori Jazz festival was arranged in the same year, but only in the summer. The first Ruisrock was arranged only four years later.

One of the organizers of the festival was Juhani “Jussi” Joutsenniemi, who together with his band the Hootenanny Trio, the Guldgurkorna, Anki Lindqvist bands had been touring the folk festivals in England. He thought that something similar should be arranged in Finland, too. Joutsenniemi had, for some time, already been arranging folk music club events in e.g. Munkkiniemi. At the Munkkiniemi secondary school, there were people who were eager to arrange various events, and they helped organize the event. The person who came up with the location of the festival was Sinikka Sokka, who at the time courted a young man whose father had rented the Sandvik fishermen’s village as their summer residence. Soukka thought the place would be an ideal one for the festival. Sokka’s own group, Sinkat, would be among the performers.

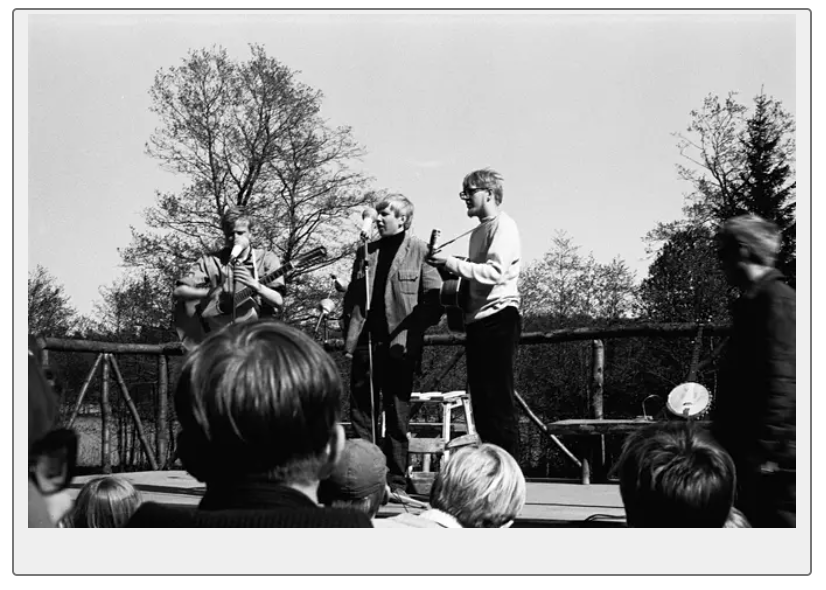
Hootenanny Trio performing in Sandvik in 1966.

Modern maps no longer show the location of Sandvik. But it is known that it was located near where Soukka met Espoonlahti, around the current Ristiniementie street. There were no structures such as stage with a roof or places for the audience to sit. They spent the night in some small houses in the area. Transportation to the site was arranged by special buses from the Kampintori square in Helsinki.

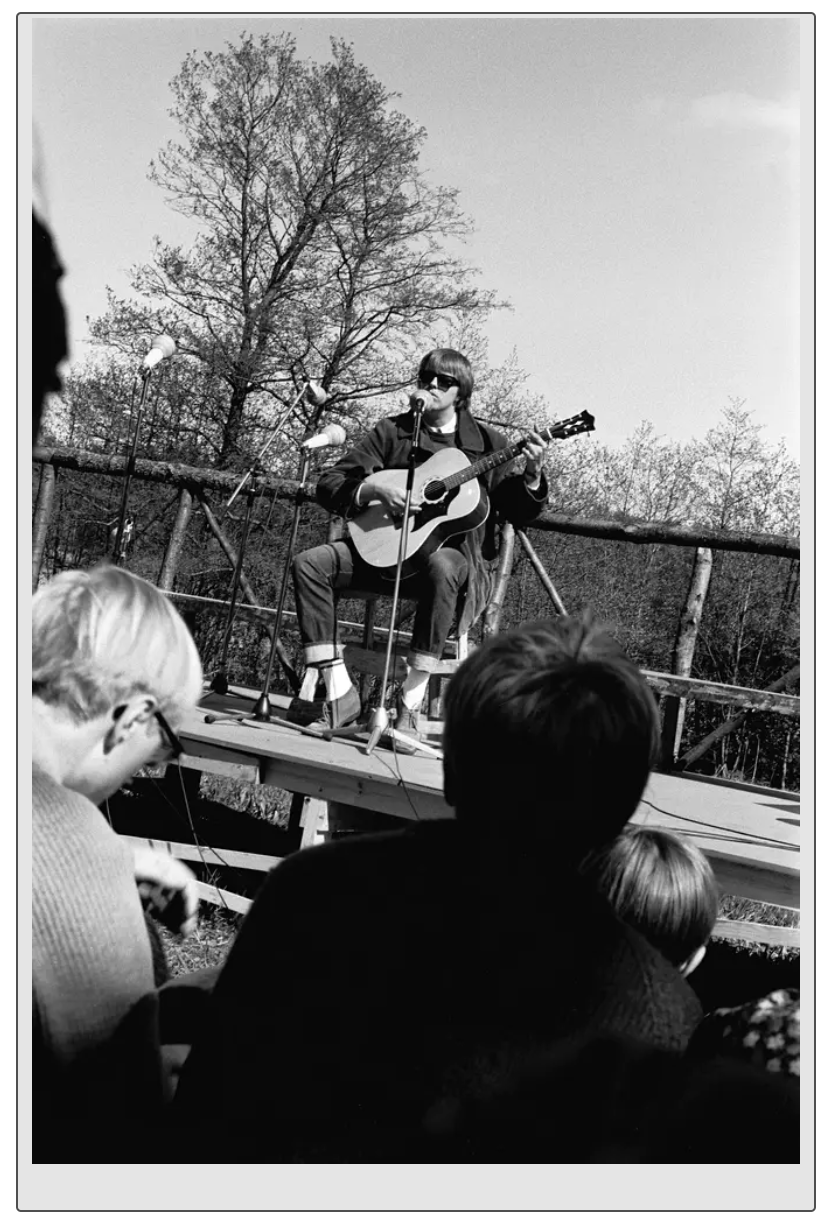
Hector performing in Sandvik in 1966.

The top of the bill was occupied by the American-Canadian singer Buffy Sainte-Marie. Her fee and expenses were paid for by Yle, who also recorded the event. For some reason, Yle did not arrange transportation for Sainte-Marie from the airport, so the task fell on Timo Pakkanen, known for performing as Santa Claus. Sainte-Marie was then known for her hit “Universal Soldier”, the translation of which had been released earlier that year by the Finnish young rising star Hector with the title “Palkkasoturi” (‘mercenary’). His version had flown to the top of the Finnish charts. Sainte-Marie knew about this version and mentioned it while speaking to the audience.

The following artists and bands performed in the final concert:

- Buffy Sainte-Marie (USA)
- Hootenanny Trio
- Hector
- Päivi Paunu
- Sinkat
- Finn Trio
- Guldgurkorna
- Anki
- Jukka Kuoppamäki
- Three Voices
- Pirkan neidot
- Pokelat
- Seurasaaren pelimannit
- Gregory Allan Fitzpatrick (USA)

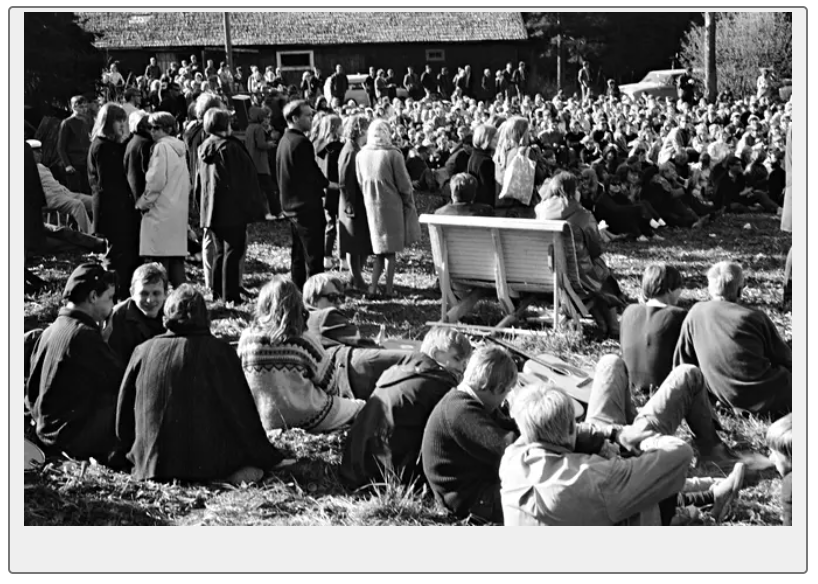
A view of the audience at the Sandvik folk festival in 1966.

Joutsenniemi remembers the event in the following:

It was not a rowdy event. It was no rock festival. People sat on the ground and listened to the music. The feeling was rather a pious one.

The weather was favourable in that it did not rain. However, the temperature was less than ten degrees. Not only gigs were played at the festival, but also workshops, discussions and sing-alongs were arranged. Pertti Reponen taught banjo playing, and Erkki Alakönni delivered a lecture on folk music.
