= Geantraí =

- Country of origin: Republic of Ireland
- Original language: Irish

Production
- Production locations: Baile na hAbhann, Galway

Original release
- Network: TG4
- Release: 1996 – present

Geantraí (Irish pronunciation: [ˈɟan̪ˠt̪ˠɾˠiː]) is an Irish television programme, presenting Irish traditional music.

The name derives from Geantraí, one of the three types of Irish music enumerated in the "three noble strains"; geantraí (joy music), suantraí (lullaby) and goltraí (sorrow music). In Old Irish, they were spelled geantraige, suantraige, goltraige.
