= A Hidden Ulster =

- Hardback cover of first edition
- Author: Pádraigín Ní Uallacháin
- Language: English; Irish
- Subject: Irish traditional music, Folklore, Folk history
- Genre: Non-fiction; Encyclopedic
- Publisher: Four Courts Press (2003–2021); Ceoltaí Éireann (2022–)
- Publication date: 2003
- Media type: Paperback
- Pages: 540
- ISBN: 1-85182-738-2
- OCLC: 164938025
- LC Class: ML3654.7.U57 N5 2003

A Hidden Ulster: people, songs and traditions of Oriel is a 2003 non-fiction book that is a referencing of Irish traditional music in the Oriel area by Irish singer Pádraigín Ní Uallacháin. The book was published by Four Courts Press in both hardback and paperback formats. The book's fourth and fifth editions were printed in 2021 and 2023 under new publisher, Ceoltaí Éireann.

== Background ==
Pádraigín Ní Uallacháin, an Irish singer, song collector and academic comes from the area which was historically the Kingdom of Oriel in Ireland. She began writing the book in the years following her sister's death in May 1999.

=== Title ===
The book's title, A Hidden Ulster alludes to the lack of public knowledge among singers and song historians on the songs of Oriel. Many songs now sung in Ulster are claimed to be from County Donegal, though many of the songs originate from Oriel. The title is also tied with Ní Uallacháin's father, Pádraig's complaint in 1939 to the Department of Education in Dublin, with whom he was employed at the time. The Department released a list of 80 songs to appear in Ireland's national curriculum, none of which were from Ulster, the northern quarter of the island of Ireland. In his complaint, Pádraig wrote:

Irish: Shílfeá e h-amharc ar an liosta suarach chéadna nár canadh nóta ceoil ariamh taobh thuas den Bhóinn!
transl. One would think to look at this same miserable list that a note of music was never sung north of the Boyne!

— Pádraig Ó hUallacháin, 1939, Letter to Department of Education Dublin

== Content ==
A Hidden Ulster contains expansive notes, lyrics and translations for 54 songs found in the Oriel area, including notation, published for the first time. The book has biographies of local singers, song collectors and songwriters from various periods, catalogues of songs collected in the area and previously-unpublished glass-stained photographs from the Ulster Folk and Transport Museum. A large section of the book is dedicated to the traditions, local customs, festivals and professions of Oriel over a number of centuries.

== Reception ==
A Hidden Ulster was met with widespread acclaim. Patricia Craig of the Times Literary Supplement wrote of the book, "Pádraigín Ní Uallacháin, herself an exquisite sean-nós singer has written a timely, absorbing and scholarly account ...a triumph of cultural reclamation." Poet and academic Prof. Michael Longley said, "A momentous publication ... a treasure trove of words, a cultural and social history ... a work of phenomenal concentration, great tenderness and bighearted loyalty. Proud and heartbroaken, it is an heroic attempt to remember."

The book was a Times Book of the Year, critic Paul Muldoon commenting, "Anyone with interest in Irish song must mow look to A Hidden Ulster for the definitive account of that tradition." A Hidden Ulster was also received favourable by The Journal of Music, The Irish Times and May Field Review.

Pádraigín received Gradam Shean-Nós Cois Life for her contribution to the Irish song tradition and became the first traditional artist to be awarded a Major Arts Award from the Arts Council of Northern Ireland.

== See also ==
- Pádraigín Ní Uallacháin
- Kingdom of Oriel
