= At First Light (band) =

Irish Celtic music group

- Origin: Ireland
- Genres: Irish Traditional; Folk; Celtic
- Years active: 2006 - present
- Labels: AFL Records; Compass Records; Vertical Records
- Members: John McSherry; Dónal O'Connor; Francis McIlduff

At First Light is an Irish Celtic music group. At First Light comprises uilleann piper John McSherry, fiddle and keyboard player Dónal O'Connor, and bodhran and whistle player Francis McIlduff.

== Members ==
- John McSherry (uilleann pipes, low whistles)
- Dónal O'Connor (fiddle, keyboards)
- Francis McIlduff (whistles, bodhran)

== Discography ==
- 2012: Idir
