= Rajat Prasanna =

- Born: 20 April 1987 (age 39)
- Genre: Hindustani classical music
- Occupation: Flutist
- Instrument: Bansuri

Rajat Prasanna is an Indian Classical Flautist from the Beneres Gharana. He is the grandson of the late Pandit Raghunath Prasanna and the nephew of the late Pandit Bholanath Prasanna.

== Career ==
Rajat was taught Indian classical music from his grandfather Late Pandit Raghunath Prasanna and father Shri Ravi Shankar Prasanna (eldest son of Late Pandit Raghunath Prasanna).

== Personal life ==
Rajat is eldest of his brothers Rohit Prasanna and Rajeev Prasanna

== Discography ==
- Raag Madhuvanti, Raag Bihagda-Hidden Gems-Mystica Music,2010
- Clarian Call-Cosmic Mantra,2015, The Bhaktas
- Dharohar-2, Times Music

== Performances ==
Rajat has performed widely across the nation at various music festivals, prestigious venues including WORLD FLUTE FESTIVAL 2010 & 2011, Raasrang 2012, Raasrang 2013, Delhi International Arts Festival 2009 and 2012, Guru gangadhar memorial concert organised by Konark Natya Mandap in oct 2011, HCL concert Series 2010, Neemrana Fort Palace, kalavid Samaroh, Shri Ramakishan Mission, Rajkot (2003), Maha Shiv Ratri Sangeet Sammelan(2002) at Delhi, Yamuna Nagar Music Festival, Hariballabh Sangeet Mahasabha and Hemant Utsav in Jalandhar (2005), Arambh Utsav at Bharat Bhavan-Bhopal & Uttaradhikari-Balaghat (2005), Sangeet Pratibha at Jammu(2005) organized by Sangeet Natak Akademi, Khan Kae Niyazia, Bareilly Sangeet Sammelan at Bareilly(1999), Aanand Murti GuruMa Ashram in Gannaur, India Habitat centre & India International Centre, PSK Delhi and lecture demonstrations for Spanish Cultural Centre.

He has presented his Flute recital in the concerts arranged & organized by Ankur Kala Samiti, Kala Snehi. Interviewed on Sahara News, "Subha Savere", "Evening Live Show" for Doordarshan & "Ubherte Sitar" for DD Bharti and Delhi aajtak.

Other Performances include:

- Switzerland – World Economic Forum
- Spain, Portugal and Egypt – Festival of India
- France and Mauritius – As a part of the ICCR delegation
- Performed for the ex-President of India, Smt Pratibha Patil, The Civil Service Day (21 April 2010)
- World Flute Festival (2010 and 2011)
- Delhi International Arts Festival 2009 and 2010
- Guru Gangadhar Memorial Concert by Konark Natya Mandap (2011)
- HCL Concert Series 2010
- Neemrana Fort Palace
- Kalavid Samaroh
- Shri Ramakrishna Mission
- Rajkot (2003)
- Mahaashivraatri Sangeet Sammelan (2002), Delhi
- Yamuna Nagar Music Festival
- Hariballabh Sangeet Mahasabha
- Hemant Utsav, Jalandhar (2005)
- Arambh Utsav, Bharat Bhavan, Bhopal
- Uttaradhikari, Balaghat (2005)
- Sangeet Pratibha, Jammu (2005)
- Khan Kae Niyazia
- Bareilly Sangeet Sammelan, Bareilly (1999)
- Aanand Murti GuruMa Ashram, Gannaur
- India Habitat Centre
- India International Centre
- PSK, Delhi
- Lecture demonstrations for Spanish Cultural Centre
- Ankur Kala Samiti
- Kala Snehi
