= Laoise Kelly =

Harpist, musician and traditional Irish composer

- Born: Westport, Co. Mayo
- Known for: Harp

Laoise Kelly is a traditional Irish music composer and harpist. She won the 2020 Musician of the Year Award.

== Biography ==
Laoise Kelly is from Westport, County Mayo. Kelly learned music from her father and began learning the harp from when she was 12. She learned from Ann-Marie Scanlon and Kim Fleming as well as John Hoban. Kelly has been described as the "most significant harper of her generation". She has founded a number of groups including Bumblebees and Fiddletree with whom she has several albums each. She has also recorded albums with a wide variety of Irish artists including Uilleann piper Tiarnán Ó Duinnchinn, The Chieftains, Sharon Shannon, Mary Black, Dónal Lunny, Kate Bush, Christy Moore and American musician Tim O’Brien. She also tours with pipers, fiddlers and singers.

Kelly lives on Achill Island and was involved in founding the new Achill International Harp Festival. Kelly is also a composer and has written music for The Abbey, Dublin and the National Theatre of Scotland when they worked together on Theatre Gu Leòr’s Scotties. She's also worked as the musical director for theatre productions which took part in the Edinburgh festival. She has won three all-Ireland Fleadh Cheoil harp competitions and the O’Carolan Harp Festival.

Kelly has performed on TV and radio as well as for heads of state. She represented Ireland at the World Harp Festival in Paraguay.

== Awards ==
- 1992 the Waterford Crystal harp at the Belfast Bicentennial Harp Festival.
- 2020 TG4 Musician of the Year

== Albums ==
Bumblebees

- Bumblebees (1997)
- Buzzin (1999)

Solo

- Just Harp (1999)
- Ceis (2010)
- Fáilte Uí Cheallaigh (2015)

with Tiarnan Ó Duinnchinn

- Ar Lorg na Laochra, (2016)

with Michelle O’Brien

- The Wishing Well (2010)
