= James Goodman (musicologist) =

Canon James Goodman (22 September 1828 – 18 January 1896) was a Church of Ireland clergyman, a piper and a collector of Irish music and songs.

== Life ==
=== As a cleric ===
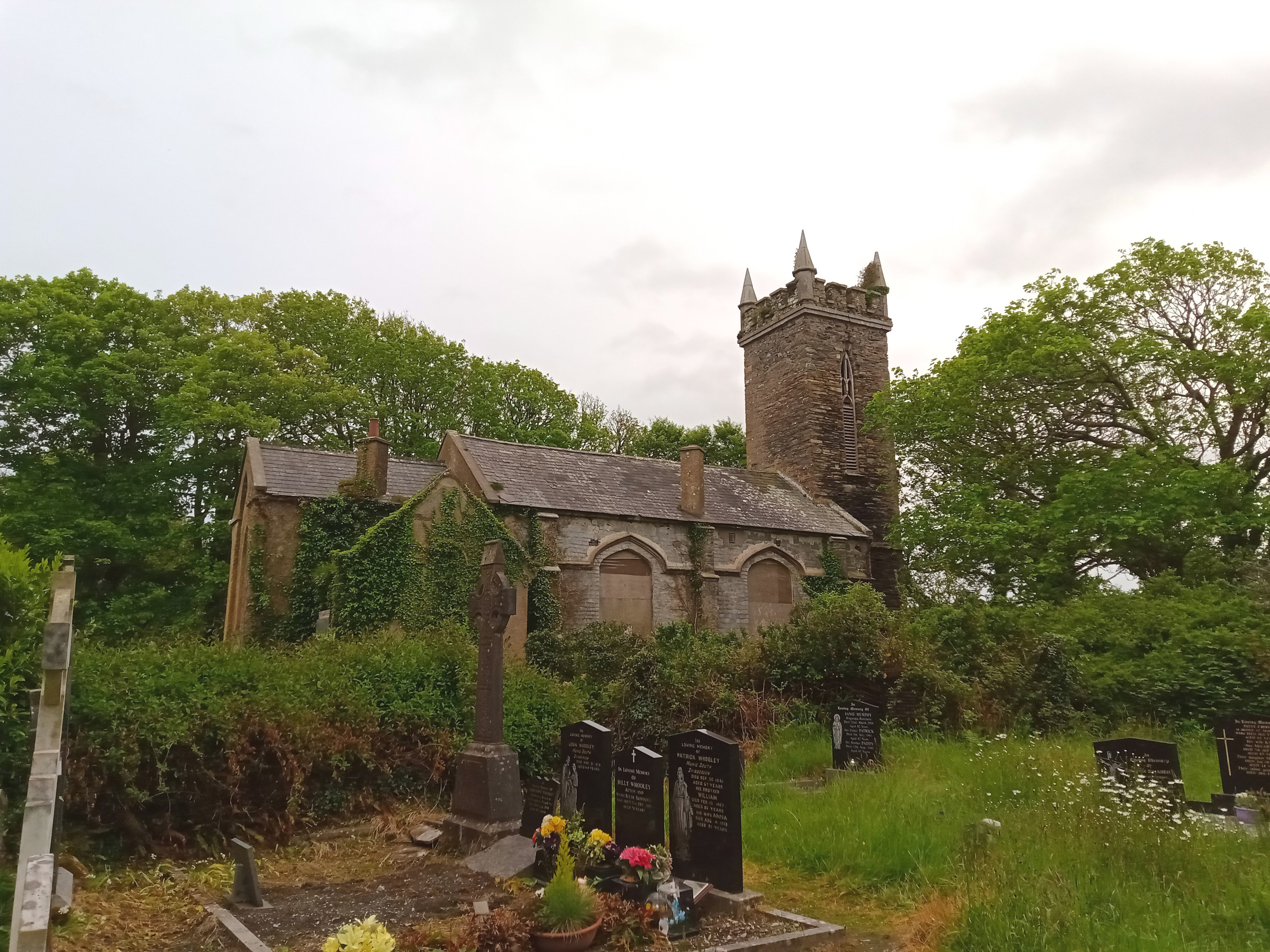
Creagh Church

Goodman was born in Ballyameen, Dingle, County Kerry and was raised in Ventry, County Kerry, a Gaeltacht area, and studied at Trinity College, Dublin, having gained a scholarship in 1847. He was ordained in the Church of Ireland in 1851 (his father the Reverend Thomas Chute Goodman had been rector of Dingle). He married Charlotte King in 1852. They had three sons, one of whom later drowned while a student, the other two set up a medical practice in Brigg, Lincolnshire.

Goodman's first clerical appointment was to Creagh parish in West Cork in 1852. In 1859, he moved to Killaconagh, on the Beara peninsula, where he preached in Irish. He was posted to the parish of Abbeystrewry in Skibbereen in 1866 as a Canon of Ross, remaining there until his death in 1896. In 1867 he self-financed the rebuilding of the local church which had become dilapidated.

A statue to commemorate him, playing his uilleann pipes, was erected in 2006 at the gate to the Abbeystrewery parish church in Skibbereen town.

He is buried at Creagh graveyard.

=== As a music collector ===
While still in Ventry, he learned to play the flute. In Ardgroom, County Cork (his second parish) there is a strong local tradition of his skill as a piper. The townlands around his own were well known for traditional music in the 19th century. Around this time, Goodman began collecting music. There is evidence in his private manuscripts and in his letters that his song and music collecting had begun during his undergraduate days. His music collection was not published in his lifetime, but by May 1861 it consisted of over 700 tunes. Some 150 of the tunes were drawn from Tom Kennedy, a blind piper living on the Dingle Peninsula. In all, his collections numbered over 2000 tunes annotated in both Irish and English. This collection is in manuscript form and now resides in the Library of Trinity College, Dublin. Of the collection, 150 to 200 of the melodies are song tunes the words of which were, for many years, believed lost. In 2006, a manuscript with over 80 song-texts was discovered and was donated to Trinity College Library.

He played a set of Taylor uilleann pipes, which he later gave to his friend Alderman Phair. He was widely admired and respected in the locality and is remembered for playing music seated under a tree outside his rectory or mending his pipes and sharing tunes with visiting pipers. He and his housekeeper Lizzie distributed alms to the local poor every Monday who came to his house for this purpose. They were known locally as "Goodman's pensioners".

=== As a Professor of Irish ===
Goodman was appointed Professor of Irish in Trinity College Dublin in 1879 and combined this position with his clerical duties in Skibbereen, spending alternating six months in each location. Among his students at Trinity College were Douglas Hyde and John Millington Synge.

== Bibliography ==
- Hugh Shields (ed.), Tunes of the Munster Pipers: Irish Traditional Music from the James Goodman Manuscripts, vol. 1, volume 1 (Dublin: Irish Traditional Music Archive, 1998). ISBN 0-9532704-0-8 (hardback), 0-9532704-1-6 (paperback).
- Hugh & Lisa Shields (eds.), Tunes of the Munster Pipers: Irish traditional music from the James Goodman manuscripts, vol. 2, volume 2 (Dublin: Irish Traditional Music Archive, 2013). ISBN 978-0-9532704-5-3 (hardback), 978-0-9532704-6-0 (paperback).
- Annotated online index of all the tunes in the four volumes of James Goodman's manuscript music collection. For the current periodically updated index in choice of PDF, HTML and Excel spreadsheet formats see ITMA's page of Supplementary Online Resources
- RTÉ Radio, Christmas 2002, Tunes of the Munster Pipers (Rebroadcast on RTÉ Lyric FM on 2 December 2013).
- Nicholas Carolan, "An t-Urramach James Goodman (1826–96), fear eaglasta, ceoltóir, agus bailitheoir ceoil", in: Foinn agus focail. Léachtaí Cholm Cille 40, in: Ruairí Ó hUiginn (ed.) )Maynooth: An Sagart, 2010), pp. 7–19.
- Padraig O Fiannachta, Seamus Goodman (West Kerry Development Co-op, 1990).
- Abbeystrewry. A Parish Memoir (On Stream Publications, 1991).
- "An Seabhac 'An t-Oll. Séamus Goodman agus a Mhuintir", in: Béaloideas, pp. 13 and 23.
- Breandán Breathnach, "Séamus Goodman 1828–1896, Bailitheoir Ceoil", in: J.K.A.H.S. (1973), No. 6.
- Jim Byrne, "Canon Goodman", in: Skibbereen and District Historical Society Journal, Vol. 1 (2005).
- Pádraig de Brún, "A Ventry Convert Group", in: J.K.A.H.S. (1980), No. 13.

== External reference ==
- ITMA JC Goodman
- Munster Pipers
- myguideIreland page with more information on James Goodman
- James Goodman collection of Irish Music at Trinity College Dublin
- James Goodman Manuscripts at the Irish Traditional Music Archive
- James Goodman, the piper and collector of tunes
