= Gael Linn =

Irish cultural promotion organisation, with record label

- Formation: 1953
- Type: Irish language Irish culture Gaelic revival
- Headquarters: 35 Dame Street, Dublin
- Website: gael-linn.ie

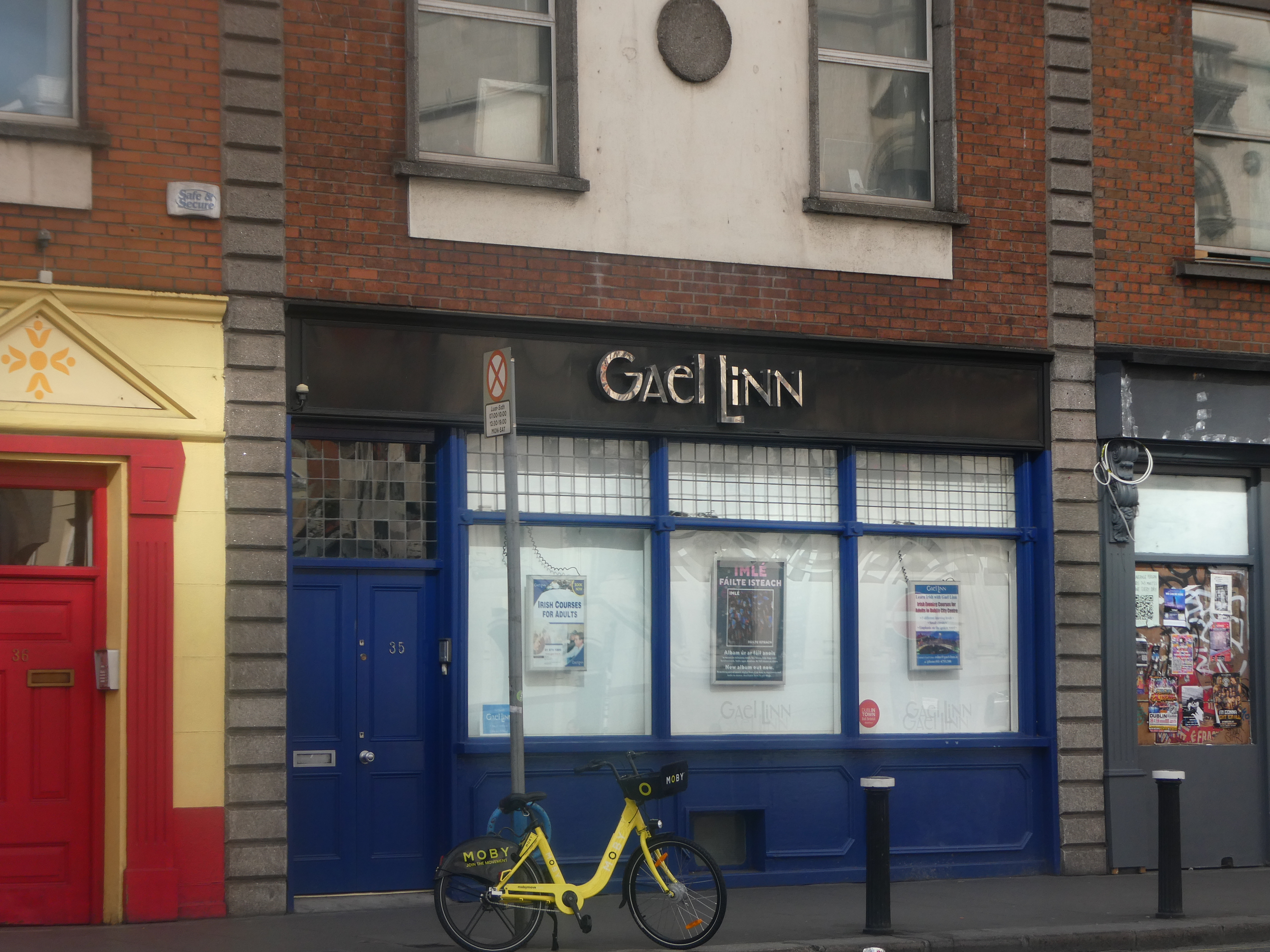
Gael Linn headquarters at Dame Street, Dublin

Gael Linn ([ˌɡeːlˠ ˈlʲiːn̠ʲ], also written Gael-Linn) is a non-profit and non-governmental organisation focused on the promotion of the Irish language and the arts. The organisation's funding includes government and lottery sources.

== History ==
Gael Linn was founded in May 1953, following a meeting in Cork, with the goal to foster interest in the Irish language and promote artistic events. Since the early years of its foundation, the organisation has also run language courses. It was initially funded by pools betting on Gaelic games; the name puns on this, with linn meaning both "with us" and "pool" in Irish.

In the mid-1950s, Gael Linn supported the production of short films and news reels which were distributed to cinemas. In 1955, Gael Linn established the Irish-language Damer Theatre on St Stephen's Green which it operated until 1976. In 1959, Gael Linn produced the feature-length documentary film Mise Éire, which included an acclaimed score by composer Seán Ó Riada.

== Record label ==
Gael Linn Records is a record label which was founded in the 1950s and is run by Gael Linn. According to the organisation's web site, the "Gael Linn record label was established in 1956 to provide an outlet for recordings of sean-nós singing and traditional music".

Gael Linn has released records by a number of traditional Irish musicians. In the early 1970s, the label released Skara Brae's self-titled debut album, and the single from that album also contained Clannad tracks from their own début album on the other side. Clannad was one of the label's most popular acts, until the band signed with RCA Records in 1982. The former members of Skara Brae have all released solo/duet albums under Gael Linn. These artists include Maighréad Ní Dhomhnaill, Tríona Ní Dhomhnaill and Mícheál Ó Domhnaill, as well as Altan's Daithí Sproule.

Gael Linn Records have issued recordings by Michael Coleman, Seán Ryan, and Ceoltóirí Chualann. The label's roster has also included Andy Irvine, Paul Brady, The Bothy Band, De Dannan, Dolores Keane, Nóirín Ní Riain, Pádraigín Ní Uallacháin, and Gerry O'Connor. Several of the label's recordings have been licensed to be reissued on the Green Linnet label.

== Slógadh ==
Gael Linn established a youth arts competition and festival in 1969. This festival, known as Slógadh, featured musicians and acts such as: Clannad, the Hothouse Flowers, Altan, Dolores O'Riordan and Cathal Ó Searcaigh.
