= Andy Irvine/70th Birthday Concert at Vicar St 2012 =

Live album by Andy Irvine
- Released: 3 October 2014
- Recorded: 16/17 June 2012, at Vicar Street in Dublin
- Genre: Irish / Southeastern European / Balkan / Old-timey folk music
- Length: 55:42
- Label: Andy Irvine (Ireland)
- Producer: Dónal Lunny

Andy Irvine chronology
Parachilna (2013)	Andy Irvine/70th Birthday Concert at Vicar St 2012 (2014)

Mozaik chronology
Changing Trains (2008)	Andy Irvine/70th Birthday Concert at Vicar St 2012 (2014)

Andy Irvine/70th Birthday Concert at Vicar St 2012 is a live recording of a pair of concerts held at Dublin's Vicar Street venue, on 16 and 17 June 2012, to celebrate Andy Irvine's 70th birthday.

He was joined onstage by Paul Brady and various combinations of members of Sweeney's Men, Planxty, Mozaik and LAPD, plus brothers George and Manoli Galiatsos who came unexpectedly all the way from Athens for the concerts.

A DVD was also released, featuring a more extensive set of material.

== Recording ==
LAPD open the album with two double-jigs: "Kitty's Rambles/The Humours of Ennistymon".

Then comes Mozaik's arrangement of "Sail Away Ladies/Walking in the Parlor", two old-timey tunes, the first recorded by Uncle Bunt Stephens, a Tennessee fiddler, in 1925 and the second by Dr D. Dix Hollis in Alabama, the same year.

Sweeney's Men play "Rattlin' Roarin's Willie", sung by Johnny Moynihan.

LAPD follow with "O'Donoghue's", a song by Irvine reminiscing about his early days in Dublin, when he first started frequenting this pub in August 1962. In eleven verses, he vividly recalls these happy times, naming many of the people who were part of his transition from actor to musician, leading to his touring days with Sweeney's Men and up to his departure "for the Pirin Mountains" in the spring of 1968.

Paul Brady then joins LAPD to perform "The Jolly Soldier/The Blarney Pilgrim", which he and Irvine recorded on their 1976 album Andy Irvine/Paul Brady.

Mozaik are joined by brothers George and Manoli Galiatsos, who performed "In Foreign Lands", a traditional song in 9/16 time from Evros in Western Thrace and sung in Greek.

Sweeney's Men perform "My Dearest Dear", sung by Terry Woods.

Liam O'Flynn joins Mozaik to perform "Suleiman's Kopanitsa", an adaptation of "Dance of Suleiman" that Irvine had recorded on the album East Wind with Davy Spillane. The Mozaik rendition also has all the melodic phrases re-worked for string instruments emphasising the 11/16 'kopanitsa' rhythm (2–2–3–2–2) with counter-harmonies from Irvine (mandola), van der Zalm (mandolin) and Lunny (bouzouki), augmented by O'Flynn (tin whistle and uileann pipes), Parov (gadulka and kaval) and Molsky (fiddle).

Paul Brady joins LAPD (minus O'Flynn) to perform Irvine's arrangement of "Plains of Kildare", also originally from the 1976 album Andy Irvine/Paul Brady: an instrumental intro in 6/8 time (jig) leads into the song, which is in 3/4 time for the first six verses until an elegant transition switches to an instrumental middle eight played in the 'Bulgarian rachenitsa' rhythm of 7/8 time (2–2–3) which aptly suggests the gallop of racing horses, then back in 3/4 (as the horses slow down) for the final verse prior to the finale, again in 6/8.

Mozaik deliver "Romanian Horă", a fiddle tune learnt from Jacky Molard and played by van der Zalm, followed by Molsky's "Black Jack Grove" and its Blueridge mountains feel.

LAPD follow with "West Coast of Clare", a romantic song written by Irvine about the times he spent in Milltown Malbay.

The album closes with "A Blacksmith Courted Me", where LAPD, Paul Brady and Mozaik join forces to deliver Irvine's version of "The Blacksmith" (with Molsky on 5-string banjo) followed, as usual, by "Blacksmithereens", a tune in 5/8 time that Irvine wrote following his first impressions of Balkan music in 1968.

== Track listing ==
1. "Kitty's Rambles"/"Humours of Ennistymon" (Trad. Arr. O'Flynn / Glackin / Lunny / Irvine) – 4:20
2. "Sail Away Ladies"/"Walking in the Parlor" (Trad. Arr. Molsky / van der Zalm / Irvine / Lunny / Parov) – 3:27
3. "Rattlin' Roarin' Willy" (Trad. Arr. Moynihan / Irvine / Woods) – 2:03
4. "O'Donoghue's" (Andy Irvine) – 5:20
5. "The Jolly Soldier" (Trad. / Arr. Paul Brady 2011) / "The Blarney Pilgrim" (Trad. / Arr. Irvine / Brady / Lunny / Glackin / O'Flynn) – 5:36
6. "In Foreign Lands" (Εγω Στα Ξενα) (Trad. Arr. George and Manoli Galiatsos) – 4:24
7. "My Dearest Dear" (Trad. / Terry Woods) – 4:04
8. "Suleman's Kopanitsa" (Trad. Arr. Irvine / Lunny / Molsky / Parov / van der Zalm) – 5:06
9. "Plains of Kildare" (Trad. Arr. Andy Irvine) – 4.23
10. "Romanian Horă" / "Black Jack Grove" (Trad. Arr. Irvine / Lunny / Molsky / van der Zalm / Parov) – 5:28
11. "The West Coast of Clare" (Andy Irvine) – 5:38
12. "A Blacksmith Courted Me" (Trad. Arr. Irvine / Lunny / Molsky / van der Zalm/ Parov) / "Blacksmithereens" (Irvine / Lunny) – 5:53

== Personnel ==
- Andy Irvine - vocals, bouzouki, mandola, harmonica
- Liam O'Flynn - uilleann pipes, tin whistle
- Paddy Glackin - fiddle
- Dónal Lunny - backing vocals, bouzouki, guitar
- Bruce Molsky - vocals, fiddle, 5-string banjo
- Nikola Parov - gadulka, kaval, tin whistle, guitar
- Rens van der Zalm - fiddle, mandolin
- Johnny Moynihan - vocals, bouzouki, tin whistle
- Terry Woods - vocals, guitar
- Paul Brady - vocals, guitar, mandolin, backing vocals
- George Galiatsos - vocals, laouto
- Manoli Galiatsos - vocals, octave mandola
