= Parachilna (album) =

Live album by Andy Irvine with Rens van der Zalm
- Released: 13 November 2013
- Recorded: July 2012, in the Australian Outback
- Genre: Irish and Australian folk music
- Length: 46:22
- Label: Andy Irvine (Ireland)
- Producer: Andy Irvine & Rens van der Zalm

Andy Irvine chronology
Abocurragh (2010)	Parachilna (2013)	Andy Irvine/70th Birthday Concert at Vicar St 2012 (2014)

Parachilna is an album by Andy Irvine and Rens van der Zalm, of Irish and Australian songs recorded live in July 2012, while camping in the Australian Outback.

It was co-produced by Irvine (vocals, bouzouki, mandola and harmonica) and van der Zalm (backing vocals, guitar, mandolin, fiddle and viola), and recorded by Cian Burke in disused buildings using top-quality microphones, a laptop and Pro Tools.

Most of the time, there are only two instruments playing–three when Irvine also plays harmonica–and the resulting sound is bright and pristine.

== Recording ==
The album opens with "I wish I was in Belfast Town", a new adaptation of "You Rambling Boys Of Pleasure", which Irvine learnt from Joe Holmes and Len Graham before recording it with Planxty on the album After the Break.

"Come to the Bower" is a song Luke Kelly used to sing in O'Donoghue's Pub during the 1960s and Irvine tells us he believes it was written as an exhortation to Irish emigrants to return home and support the 1867 Fenian rising.

"Billy Far Out" is an amusing song about the vagaries of travelling in an unreliable car and was written by Irvine after similar experiences during one of his Australian tours; its tune and accompaniment are based on a 1931 recording of "A Lazy Farmer Boy" by Buster Carter & Preston Young.

Irvine previously recorded "Sergeant Small" with Patrick Street for the album On the Fly; it tells the story of an Australian unemployed man who rides freight trains in his search for work during the Great Depression in the 1930s but gets trapped by Sergeant Small, a policeman masquerading as a hobo.

Next comes "The Dandenong", a song that Australian folk singer Kate Burke found in the archives of the National Library of Australia. Collected in 1954 by John Meredith from a Mrs Mary Byrnes, an old lady of Irish descent, the song tells the story of the loss of the Dandenong and most of its passengers during a voyage from Melbourne to Newcastle, NSW in 1876.

"Braes of Moneymore" is another poignant song of emigration, which Irvine recorded on the album No. 2 Patrick Street and which he'd learnt from an old 78 rpm recording, made in 1952 by Sean O'Boyle and Peter Kennedy, of Terry Devlin, a shoemaker local to Moneymore in County Londonderry.

"Outlaw Frank Gardiner" is a song about the famous bushranger; Irvine wrote new music for it in the Bulgarian 'chetvorno' rhythm of 7/8 (3-2-2).

"He Fades Away" was written by Scottish singer-songwriter Alistair Hulett, about the miners from southern Europe who were imported in the 1950s to work the blue asbestos mines in Wittenoom, Western Australia. Irvine first recorded this song on his third solo album Rain on the Roof.

"Farewell to Kellswater" is song H695 from Sam Henry's collection, about an Irish girl's rich father sending an unwanted young suitor to America; Irvine first recorded this with Planxty on the album The Woman I Loved So Well.

The album closes with Irvine's self-penned song, "Douglas Mawson", about the epic and tragic Antarctic expedition of 1911. This song was originally released on Irvine's second solo album, Rude Awakening.

== Track listing ==
1. "I wish I was in Belfast Town" (Trad. arr. Andy Irvine) – 5:13
2. "Come to the Bower" (Trad. arr. Andy Irvine) – 5:06
3. "Billy Far Out" (Andy Irvine) – 3:34
4. "Sergeant Small" (Trad. arr. Andy Irvine) – 4:04
5. "The Dandenong" (Trad. arr. Kate Burke / Andy Irvine) – 4:41
6. "Braes of Moneymore" (Trad. arr. Andy Irvine) – 4:02
7. "Outlaw Frank Gardiner" (Trad. arr. Andy Irvine) – 3:28
8. "He Fades Away" (Alistair Hulett) – 3:58
9. "Farewell to Kellswater" (Trad. arr. Andy Irvine) – 5:27
10. "Douglas Mawson" (Andy Irvine) – 6:40

== Personnel ==
- Andy Irvine - vocals, bouzouki, mandola and harmonica.
- Rens van der Zalm - backing vocals, guitar, mandolin, fiddle and viola.
- "The Parachilna Parrots" - Ian Stewart, Roger Hargreaves, Louise Woodhouse - backing vocals on track 4: "Sergeant Small".

Produced by - Andy Irvine & Rens van der Zalm.
Recorded out in the 'wild', in South Australia and New South Wales.
Engineered by - Cian Burke.
Mixed & Edited by Ton Snijders, Rens van der Zalm and Andy Irvine at Snijder's studio in Velp, the Netherlands.
Remixed and Mastered by Tim Martin at Long Beard Sound in Dublin, Ireland.
