= Creggan White Hare =

19th century Irish folk song

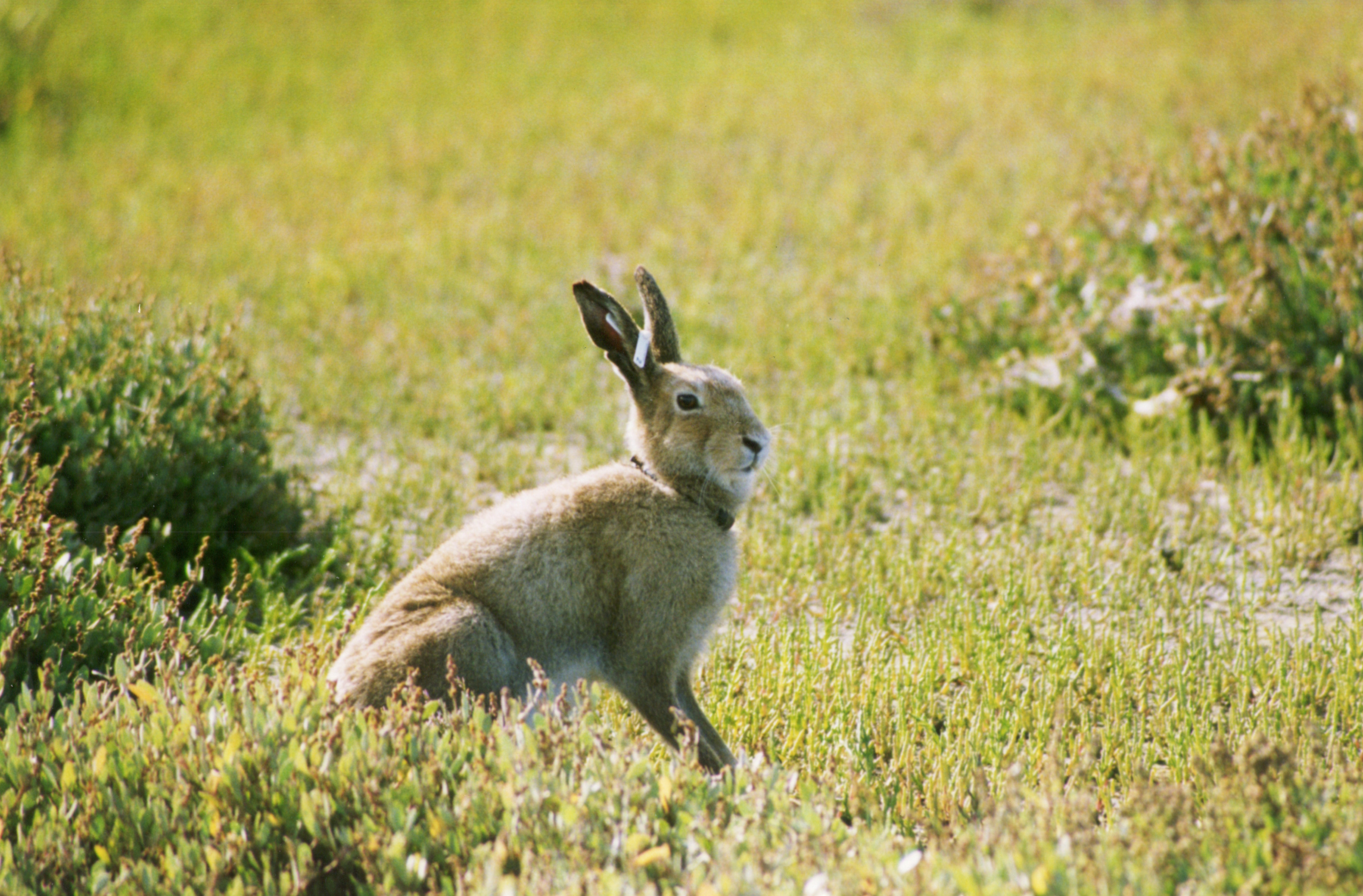
An Irish white hare.

The "Creggan White Hare" is an Irish folk song (Roud 9633). It was first recorded by Paddy Tunney in 1944.

The song describes coursing events that took place in Creggan, County Tyrone. After Barney Conway failed to catch the hare while out hunting, he joins a group of sportsmen, "with pedigree greyhounds", to hunt the hare, who eludes them.

Robert B. Waltz speculates that the hare might be an allusion to Michael Collins who eluded the British during the Irish War of Independence.

== Recordings ==
The following is a select list of recordings of the song.

- Paddy Tunney (1945)
- Andy Irvine; with Dick Gaughan on Parallel Lines (1982)
- Karan Casey, on Songlines (1997)
- Kevin Mitchell, on Have a Drop Mair, Musical Tradition Records MTCD315-6 CD (2001)
- Daoirí Farrell, on The First Turn (2008)
