= Parachilna =

Parachilna may refer to:

- Parachilna, South Australia, a town and locality
- Hundred of Parachilna, a cadastral unit in South Australia
- Parachilna (album), an audio recording
- Parachilna Fettlers' Cottages Ruins, a heritage-listed site - refer Parachilna, South Australia
- Parachilna Gorge, a gorge in South Australia which can be accessed via the Heysen Trail
