= Andy Irvine (musician) =

Irish folk musician (born 1942)

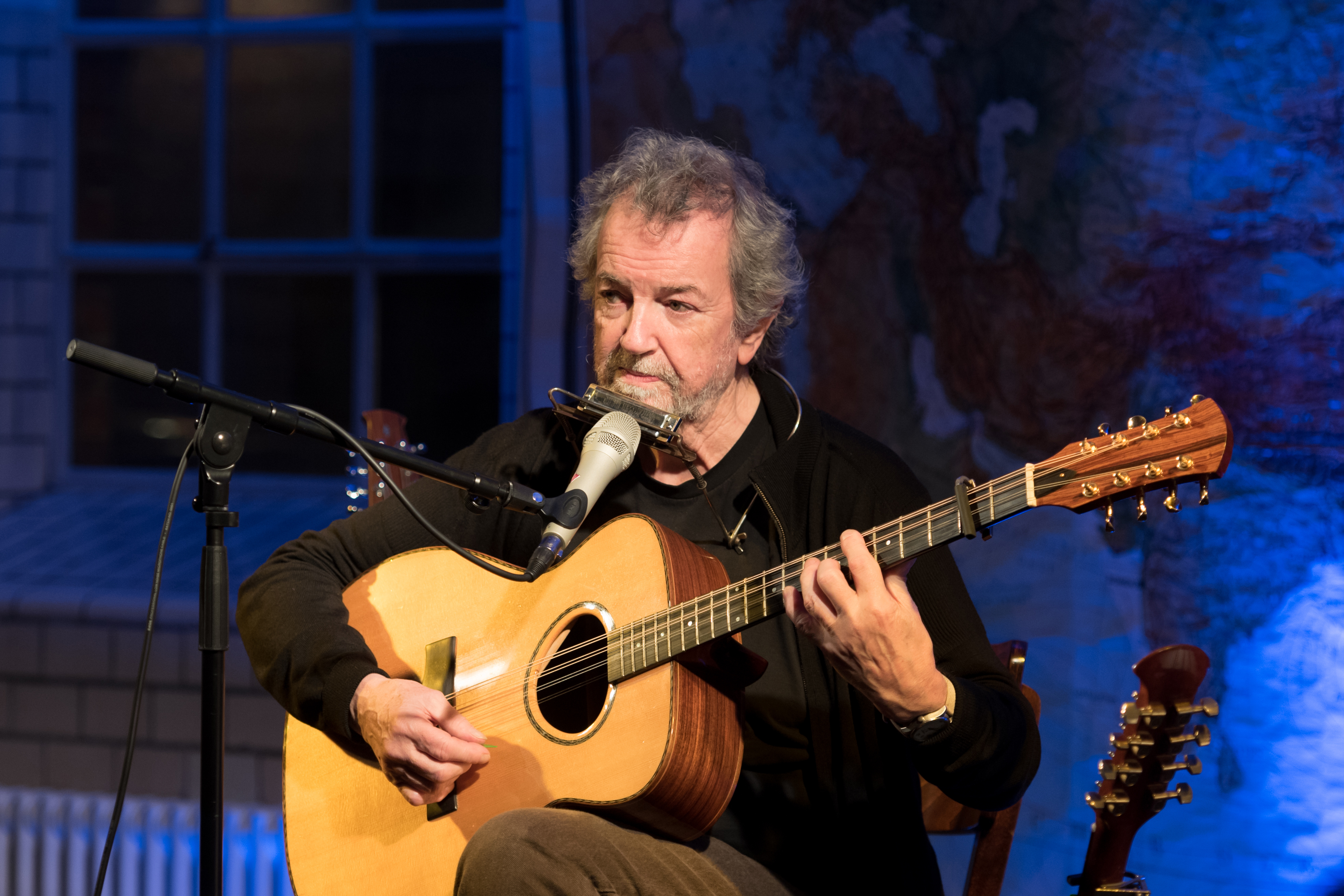
- Irvine playing a guitar-bodied Irish bouzouki at Lottes Musiknacht (27 November 2016).

Background information
- Born: Andrew Kennedy Irvine; 14 June 1942 (age 84); St John's Wood, London, England
- Genres: Irish; English; Scottish; Old-time; American; Bulgarian; Balkan; Australian folk music
- Occupations: Musician, singer-songwriter
- Instruments: Vocals; mandolin; mandola; bouzouki; hurdy-gurdy; guitar-bodied bouzouki; guitar; harmonica
- Years active: 1962–present
- Member of: Usher's Island
- Formerly of: Sweeney's Men; Planxty; Mosaic; Patrick Street; Mozaik; LAPD; Usher's Island
- Website: andyirvine.com
- Mother: Felice Lascelles
- Relatives: Susan Neil (half-sister)
- Awards: 2018 RTÉ Radio 1 Lifetime Achievement Award

Andrew Kennedy Irvine (born 14 June 1942) is an Irish folk musician, singer-songwriter, and a founding member of Sweeney's Men, Planxty, Patrick Street, Mozaik, LAPD and Usher's Island. He also featured in duos, with Dónal Lunny, Paul Brady, Mick Hanly, Dick Gaughan, Rens van der Zalm, and Luke Plumb. Irvine plays the mandolin, mandola, bouzouki, harmonica, and hurdy-gurdy.

He has been influential in folk music for over six decades, during which he recorded a large repertoire of songs and tunes he assembled from books, old recordings and folk-song collectors rooted in the Irish, English, Scottish, Eastern European, Australian and American old-time and folk traditions.

As a child actor, Irvine honed his performing talent from an early age and learned the classical guitar. He switched to folk music after discovering Woody Guthrie, also adopting the latter's other instruments: harmonica and mandolin. While extending Guthrie's guitar picking technique to the mandolin, he further developed his playing of this instrument—and, later, of the mandola and the bouzouki—into a decorative, harmonic style, and embraced the modes and rhythms of Bulgarian folk music.

Along with Johnny Moynihan and Dónal Lunny, Irvine is one of the pioneers who adapted the Greek bouzouki—with a new tuning—into the Irish bouzouki. He contributed to advancing the design of his instruments in co-operation with English luthier Stefan Sobell, and he sometimes plays a hurdy-gurdy made for him in 1972 by Peter Abnett, another English luthier.

Although touring mainly as a soloist, Irvine has also enjoyed great success in pursuing collaborations through many projects that have influenced contemporary folk music. He continues to tour and has performed extensively in Ireland, Great Britain, Europe, North and South America, Japan, Australia and New Zealand. In October 2018, he received the first Lifetime Achievement Award bestowed at RTÉ Radio 1's inaugural Folk Music Awards.

== Early life and acting career ==
Andy Irvine was born in St John's Wood, northwest London on 14 June 1942. His mother, Felicia Madge Lessels, was from Wallasey, Merseyside, (Note: His mother's birth place is disputed: O'Toole has Lisburn, County Antrim; Lessels Yates says Wallasey, Merseyside, as his mother herself stated during an interview with the Liverpool Evening Express on 14 September 1926.) and his father, Archibald Kennedy Irvine, from Glasgow. His mother had been a musical comedy actress who performed under the stage name of Felice Lascelles, and Irvine would later say that "she may have given up the stage, but she never stopped acting!". At the age of three-and-a-half, Irvine started attending boarding school, where he would later play football during the winter season, rugby during the spring season, and cricket during the summer season, all of which fostered his lifelong passion for team sports.

As a child, Irvine was given opportunities to appear on stage, TV and in films. In the summer holidays of 1950, when he was eight years old, his first role was to play Jimmy in the film A Tale of Five Cities (released as A Tale of Five Women in the US). At thirteen, he starred as Nokie (short for Pinocchio) in the ITV children's series Round at the Redways and joined a school for child actors. He made his stage debut in the Grand Theatre in Wolverhampton and, at fourteen, received rave reviews for his performance as Morgan in the ITV Television Playhouse drama The Magpies, adapted from a Henry James short story. The same year, he was Eric Brandt in Escape to Happiness, for the Armchair Theatre programme and also played John Logie Baird as a boy in the film A Voice in Vision. In early 1958, Irvine featured as Archie Almond in five episodes of Run to Earth. In June that year, he played Lord Heybrook in French Without Tears for the Saturday Playhouse TV series and, soon after, was one of the 'Pygmies' in Brouhaha, with Peter Sellers as the Sultan. Irvine then played Raymond opposite Laurence Harvey in Room at the Top and, although his scene was cut from the final release, he still appears briefly in the film, handing a bottle of champagne to Harvey during a wedding scene. In late 1959, he featured as Lanky Graham in Ask for King Billy and, in early 1960, he played a schoolboy in A Holiday Abroad for ITV Television Playhouse. Later that year, at eighteen, Irvine performed as Dan in three episodes of Sheep's Clothing, after which he was offered a two-year contract with the BBC's Repertory company ('The Rep'), where he befriended the poet Louis MacNeice who worked there as a writer for over twenty years. As Irvine recalled much later:

There was a pub quite near the BBC called The George [...] and all these intellectual people would drink in there and I would hang out with them. Louis would be talking to other famous poets and playwrights and I wouldn't really understand a lot of the conversation, but I'd be hanging on every word. I was much taken with Louis' secretary [...] I used to go and visit her in Louis' office in the afternoons [which] he spent in the British Museum Reading Room.

— Andy Irvine, The Humours of Planxty by Leagues O'Toole.

However, Irvine would give up acting in his early twenties, after moving to Dublin at the end of his time with the 'Rep'.

== Influences ==
=== Music ===
Irvine loved music from the earliest time he could remember. His mother had a stack of old, cracked 78s that he used to play on a wind-up gramophone. "They were mainly songs from long forgotten musical comedies but I wish I had them now." At thirteen, he studied classical guitar for two years, initially with Julian Bream and later under one of Bream's pupils but switched to folk music after discovering Woody Guthrie during the Skiffle boom of the 1950s.

Guthrie was to become an enduring influence on his music, on his choice of additional instruments (mandolin and harmonica) and general outlook on life. In a 1985 interview, Irvine expanded on how, in the mid-1950s, he discovered Woody Guthrie through Lonnie Donegan's recordings on the EPs Backstairs Session and Skiffle Session:

He had two EPs and I thought: 'That's it!' – "Midnight Special", "It Takes A Worried Man", "Railroad Bill" and "When The Sun Goes Down". On the back of the jacket, I read that Donegan learned these wonderful songs from the recordings of Woody Guthrie and Cisco Houston. This fired my youthful imagination and I wanted so badly to hear the originals. [...] In 1957, [I got] this record called More Songs By Woody Guthrie And Cisco Houston and it blew my mind. Eventually, I bought Woody Guthrie's Dust Bowl Ballads, the original 78s, in mint condition for $40 each. I used to sit all day, alone, and listen to Woody Guthrie and practise. I was playing with my thumb. I didn't know anything about a flatpick, but I could do the best imitation of Woody. I wanted to play every instrument he played. That's why I took up the harmonica and mandolin. When I discovered Irish and British music, I figured out how to adapt my basic Woody Guthrie 'scratch' style on guitar to playing traditional songs on the mandolin.

— Andy Irvine, Celtic Roots... Dustbowl Inspiration by Joe Vanderford.

In May 1959, Irvine began frequenting the Ballads and Blues Club—started at the Princess Louise pub in High Holborn by Ewan MacColl in 1957—which, by September 1959, had moved to 2, Soho Square under the sole leadership of Malcolm Nixon. American folk musicians who had been closely associated with Guthrie would perform there: Ramblin' Jack Elliott, Derroll Adams and Cisco Houston; Irvine befriended all three of them, particularly Elliott, who taught him how to play the harmonica in Guthrie's style:

Ramblin' Jack Elliott [...] gave me the crucial information that Woody Guthrie used to play the harp upside down!! Apparently so did the southern blues players of that period. There is no dis/advantage in this but I'm glad I learned to play it upside down like Woody!

— Andy Irvine, Andy's Instruments.

After locating Guthrie at Greystone Park Psychiatric Hospital in Morristown, New Jersey, Irvine began corresponding with Sid Gleason who, with her husband Bob, would take Guthrie out of hospital and entertain him at weekends. She was the first person to call him "Andy", and thereafter remained a conduit between him and Guthrie.

The Gleasons got me a job at a petrol station in East Orange, New Jersey, but then I got invited on to the BBC Radio Rep and couldn't get out of it. I did that for a couple of years and grew out of the desire to be a petrol pump attendant at East Orange, New Jersey.

— Andy Irvine, The Greeking of the Irish by Colin Irwin

During 1959, Irvine and Elliott also recorded audio tapes to send Guthrie and, after recording one of Guthrie's songs, Elliott exclaimed: "Andy, you sound more like Woody than I do!", just as Guthrie had once said to Elliott: "Jack, you sound more like me than I do!". However, Irvine's dream to join Guthrie in the States eventually faded when his mother died in 1961.

In 1991, Irvine wrote his tribute song to Woody Guthrie: "Never Tire of the Road", first released on the solo album Rude Awakening. He recorded it again for the album Rain on the Roof, released in 1996, after including another verse plus the chorus from a song Guthrie recorded in March 1944: "You Fascists Are Bound to Lose".

In a 2000 interview, Irvine stated: "I never met Woody, but I corresponded with him in hospital. (Note: Irvine's letters to Guthrie are catalogued (alphabetical order) in "S2 Box 2 – Folder(s) 01/-02/-03 (1959 – June 1960)" among the Series 2 (Correspondence-2): Woody Guthrie – Incoming Correspondence of the Correspondence Collection in the Woody Guthrie Archives at the Woody Guthrie Center in Tulsa, OK.) [...] The kind of values that Woody represented are one of my great passions."

=== Social justice ===
Irvine is a card-carrying member of the Industrial Workers of the World (the 'Wobblies'), with an avowed commitment to social justice. One example is his song "The Spirit of Mother Jones", which champions the life, social activism and energetic organising leadership of Mary Harris Jones ('Mother Jones'), which he recorded and released on his 2010 album Abocurragh. On 1 August 2012, Irvine performed in Shandon, County Cork, for the inaugural Mother Jones Festival which celebrated the 175th Anniversary of the birth of Mary Harris; he performed at the Festival again on 1 August 2013.

Like other artists contracted to perform at Féile Iorrais (a community festival in Erris) in August 2007, Irvine was disgusted to learn that Royal Dutch Shell were partly sponsoring the events. Shell's plans for the Corrib gas project have been the subject of controversy in County Mayo. Irvine pledged to donate part of his fee to the Shell to Sea campaign.

== Music career ==
=== 1960s: Dublin, Sweeney's Men, Eastern Europe ===
==== Move to Dublin and transition from acting to folk music ====
In 1962, when his two-year contract with the BBC's 'Rep' ended, Irvine moved to Dublin and continued earning a living as an actor for a while, playing at The Olympia, The Gaiety, The Gate and The Eblana. He also performed at the Pike Theatre, where he played the role of Jerry as one of only two actors in Edward Albee's The Zoo Story, and where he also appeared as Tethra (the Irish god of war) in Moytura by Pádraic Colum, during the Dublin Theatre Festival in 1963. In late 1963, he had a part in a few episodes of Down at Flannery's, a forerunner of the popular RTÉ soapTolka Row in which he appeared for five episodes in the role of Jim "Beardie" Toomey, the boyfriend of Laurie Morton's character, Peggy Kinnear. One of his last acting performances was at the Olympia Theatre on 28 September 1964 as Sir Peregrine in Sir Buccaneer, a musical by G.P. Gallivan.

However, he very quickly noticed that a burgeoning folk scene was emerging, centred around the Baggot Street–Merrion quarter of Dublin's city centre. "As soon as I found my feet there, I thought, 'That's it, goodbye acting!'". After discovering Irish music through Séamus Ennis on Peter Kennedy's BBC programme As I Roved Out and through Ciarán Mac Mathúna on Raidió Éireann, Irvine studiously spent many hours at the National Library, scouring old songbooks like the Child Ballads and Sam Henry's Songs of the People, as well as A.L. Lloyd's Penguin Book of English Folk Songs. He also drew inspiration from Ewan MacColl, notably the songs he wrote for his radio-ballads.

Gravitating around Paddy and Maureen O'Donoghue's Pub, Irvine met like-minded people such as Ronnie Drew, Luke Kelly and Barney McKenna, who would later form The Dubliners. Decades later, he recorded "O'Donoghue's"—released on the album Changing Trains (2004)—a song of eleven verses in which he vividly recalls these happy times, naming many of the people who were part of his transition from actor to folk musician.

==== Sweeney's Men – Sweeney's Men ====
One of these people was Johnny Moynihan, with whom he created a musical partnership which turned into Sweeney's Men in the summer of 1966, after the addition of 'Galway Joe' Dolan. To quote Colin Irwin: "They merged the familiar American folk style so popular in the early sixties with a distinctively home-grown Irish flavour; it was not Irish music but it was real and exciting, it had verve, imagination and style." A distinctive aspect of the Sweeney's Men sound was Moynihan's introduction of the bouzouki—originally a Greek instrument—into Irish music, albeit with a different tuning: GDAD' (one octave lower than the open-tuned mandolin), instead of the modern Greek tuning of CFAD'.

In 1996, Irvine wrote:

A lot of early Sweeney influence came from the recordings of Old Timey American musicians from the twenties and thirties. Johnny and I tried to emulate 5-string banjos and mountainy fiddles on our open-tuned mandolins and bouzoukis. Later, after being strongly affected by Charles Parker's BBC Radio Ballads with Ewan MacColl and Peggy Seeger–notably Singing The Fishing–we began to incorporate this style into Irish and Scottish songs. [...] The bouzouki-mandolin interplay, which later became a strong feature of Planxty, was "invented" one evening in Johnny's family kitchen in Dalymount, Dublin, as we strove to find an accompaniment for Rattlin' Roarin' Willy.

— Andy Irvine, Sleeve notes from Sweeney's Men Two-in-One compilation CD.

While in the process of adopting the itinerant lifestyle of a musician, Irvine developed a taste for travel, initially within Ireland. The first time he witnessed Willie Clancy playing his uilleann pipes was at a fleadh (music festival) in Miltown Malbay in the summer of 1963, and he followed the festival trail in Ireland during the summers of 1964, 1965 and 1966. Irvine also returned regularly to London for short stays of a few weeks or months, and ventured further afield across Europe, hitch-hiking to Munich, Vienna and Rome in the autumn of 1965. In early 1966, he was playing the clubs in Denmark with Éamonn O'Doherty. In June 1966, Irvine and Dolan played five nights a week as a duo at the Enda Hotel in Galway and Moynihan would join them at weekends, since he was still working as a draughtsman in Roscommon. It was at this time that Dolan suggested the band's name, after reading Flann O'Brien's comic novel At Swim-Two-Birds, which depicts the mad, anti-religious, tree-leaping pagan King Sweeney of Antrim.

In a 2005 interview, Irvine added:

Sweeney's Men was a great learning period for me. In the early days, playing with Johnny and Joe Dolan (from Galway) I was quite new to playing with other musicians and found it tremendously exciting. That first summer of 1966 was idyllic – the kind of life I had dreamed of. The only thing that could have made it better would have been freight trains!!

— Andy Irvine, Sweet Combinations of Sound – Irish Folk Legend Andy Irvine by Kevin Moist.

The trio recorded their first single "Old Maid in the Garrett"/"The Derby Ram" for Pye Records at Eamonn Andrews Studios in the spring of 1967. The week the single was in the Irish charts, Dolan departed for Israel and the Six-Day War "but it took him a year to get down there", and was replaced by Terry Woods – later of Steeleye Span and The Pogues.

In early 1968, the new line-up recorded the eponymous album, Sweeney's Men, produced by Bill Leader at Livingston Studios, Barnet. In addition to playing either guitar, mandolin or harmonica on most tracks, Irvine contributed four songs: "Sally Brown", "Willy O' Winsbury", "Dance to Your Daddy", and "Reynard The Fox".

He also played Moynihan's bouzouki—for the first time on a recording—on the track "Johnston".

Playing bouzouki on "Johnston" is when I decided I wanted one of those. It was different. I was playing mandolin and this had a bit more depth of tone, it was that bit deeper. [...] I decided I had to go to Greece to buy one.

— Andy Irvine, The Greeking of the Irish by Colin Irwin.

Irvine wrote his first song, "West Coast of Clare", in the late summer of 1968, around the time Sweeney's Men were playing one of their last shows in Quilty, County Clare. "It was actually written with a Danish girl called Birte in mind, but [...] it very quickly became a memory of great times in Clare. I started the song in County Clare and finished it in Ljubljana, Yugoslavia, in August or September 1968."

Irvine left Sweeney's Men after a final performance at Liberty Hall in Dublin, where he played the first half of the set with Moynihan and Woods before making way for his replacement, Henry McCullough, who played the second half.

==== Discovering Eastern Europe and Bulgarian folk music ====
In the late summer of 1968, Irvine and his first wife Muriel headed off to Eastern Europe and the Balkans.

I kind of remembered that, as a stamp collector, I had liked Bulgarian stamps because they had a weird script. And, of course, I had left-wing leanings. Also, nobody went there. So, I decided to go. It was 1968 and, looking back on it, that became a period where a lot of people decided to broaden their horizons.

— Andy Irvine, The Humours of Planxty by Leagues O'Toole.

He later wrote several songs about his experiences there:

- "Time Will Cure Me", which he recorded in 1973 with Planxty on the album The Well Below the Valley;
- "Băneasă's Green Glade", which he recorded in 1974 with Planxty on the album Cold Blow and the Rainy Night;
- "Autumn Gold", which he recorded in 1976 with Paul Brady on their duo album, Andy Irvine/Paul Brady and
- "Rainy Sundays", which he recorded in 1980 on his debut solo album, Rainy Sundays... Windy Dreams.

During a series of hitch-hiking journeys across Slovenia, Serbia, Bulgaria and Romania, Irvine discovered the region's folk music styles and was particularly attracted to the Bulgarian tradition. In a 1992 interview, he related the moment he first heard Bulgarian folk music:

One day a lorry gave us a lift and the guy turned on the radio and this fantastic music came on and I thought: 'I know what that is and it's great!' So every time I was in a city or town I'd find the local music shop and go and buy records. [...] I loved the music but I didn't quite understand it [...] so it wasn't until I got home and listened to the records that I thought 'Oh, I see what they're doing!' After that, I was hooked...

— Andy Irvine, Eastern Promise by Colin Irwin.

This lasting fascination with Bulgarian folk music would inform several of his later projects—first with Planxty, then in the recording of his first solo album (1980) and of the album East Wind (1992), and also with the creation of two multicultural, similarly named bands: Mosaic (1984–85) and Mozaik (2002–present day). In turn, Irvine's integration of characteristic elements of Bulgarian folk music into his playing, such as asymmetric rhythms, would also have a profound influence on the sound of contemporary Irish music, including—via Bill Whelan—the original Riverdance score.

He also went to Thessaloniki, a Greek-Macedonian town near the Bulgarian border, to buy a bouzouki:

The fascist colonels were in power in Greece. The army had taken over and it was a very right wing government so I didn't really want to go to Greece, but I really wanted a bouzouki. [...] I had a great desire not to aid the fascist colonels in any way by leaving any money in Greece, so we went to the hospital, [...] gave our blood and got 400 drachmas each [...]. We found this shop with loads of bouzoukis which cost between 500 and 5,000 drachmas. So, I was trying them out and there was one for 800 drachmas which was about £100 then and it seemed OK.

— Andy Irvine, The Greeking of the Irish by Colin Irwin.

While in Ljubljana, he met Rens van der Zalm, a young, classically trained violinist from the Netherlands who also played guitar, mandolin, piano, accordion and tin whistle, and who was one of the founders of the Dutch folk group Fungus. They would later join forces in several of Irvine's projects.

When he returned to Dublin in the autumn of 1969, Sweeney's Men—now reduced to Moynihan and Woods—was breaking up and Irvine played a final gig with them at Nottingham University in October or November 1969.

=== 1970s: Duo with Dónal Lunny, Prosperous, Planxty, duos with Paul Brady and Mick Hanly ===
==== Duo with Dónal Lunny – "The Blacksmith" ====
After the demise of Sweeney's Men, a new Irish-English folk super-group was almost formed in 1970, with Irvine, Moynihan, Woods and his wife Gay, plus ex-Fairport Convention Ashley Hutchings joining on bass guitar, but this never happened.

For a while, Irvine performed regularly at Slattery's Pub on Capel Street. Then, he met Dónal Lunny, with whom he formed a duo after an initial gig at a party for the Irish-Soviet Union Friendship conference organised by Seán Mac Réamoinn:

Ten minutes before we went on, we arranged two pieces, one of which was "Reynard The Fox" and probably Dónal's [...] "When First unto this Country". [...] We went on stage and he was the best musician I had played with up to that point, and the quickest.
I saw the speed at which Dónal picked up on the way I was doing something and that was the first insight I had into what a great musician he was.

— Andy Irvine, The Humours of Planxty by Leagues O'Toole.

Says Leagues O'Toole: "This partnership also furthered the presence of the bouzouki in Irish music. Just as Johnny Moynihan had introduced the instrument to Andy Irvine, he in turn passed it on to Dónal Lunny". As Lunny himself recalled:

Andy had loads of instruments [...] like the kaval, the gadulka, instruments I'd never seen. One day I started playing the bouzouki and I really liked the sound of it. Because there were four pairs of strings, the chords were kind of easy. And even though it was upside down for me, I could still get chords out of it and I just really loved it. And Andy said, "Ah, take it home with you, the strings are very slack for me." So he just gave it to me. Brilliant! That was the round-bodied Greek bouzouki and [it] became the thing I used most. [...] Andy at that time played more mandolin than bouzouki, so it was a good combination between the pair of us anyway.

— Dónal Lunny, The Humours of Planxty by Leagues O'Toole.

In a 2015 interview, Irvine added his recollection of that event:

It was just before Planxty. Dónal just played guitar then but he came round to my place and there was this bouzouki there and he picked it up and started playing it immediately, even though it was right-handed and he was left-handed. I thought 'Wow, that's a talent I haven't seen before.' And he was saying 'This is great, I need to get one of these' and by that time I'd gone off the bouzouki because I thought the strings were a little slack and I'd gone back to the mandolin so I said 'Have it' and I gave it to him.

— Andy Irvine, The Greeking of the Irish by Colin Irwin.

They also created their own club night, downstairs at Slattery's Pub, which they called 'The Mug's Gig'. This featured Irvine and Lunny, and guest performers such as Ronnie Drew, Mellow Candle, and the group Supply, Demand & Curve. Clodagh Simonds, who co-founded Mellow Candle with Alison O'Donnell in 1963, recalls:

The place was always packed, and the atmosphere was amazing. I think one of the reasons it all felt so exciting was that you couldn't but be aware that they really were breaking new ground, even before Planxty formed. Something very powerful was germinating. The intricacy and the rhythmic complexity of their arrangements was something really fresh and unheard of – they were literally blowing the dust and cobwebs off some of that material and giving it this sparkling, dancing new life. It was exhilarating to witness – no other word.

— Clodagh Simonds, The Humours of Planxty by Leagues O'Toole.

By that time, Irvine had put together his own version of "The Blacksmith", followed by a self-penned coda—in a Bulgarian 5/8 rhythm—which would later be given the title of "Blacksmithereens" by Christy Moore, at a Planxty concert in 1973.

==== Christy Moore – Prosperous ====
Before too long, Irvine and Lunny participated in a project that would lead to their big break. Moore, who had moved to England during the National Bank Strike of 1966, had become an established musician in the English folk music scene and even recorded his first album (Paddy on the Road) there, in 1969, at the Sound Techniques studio in Chelsea.

After that, he decided to record his second album in Ireland and his guest musicians included Irvine, Lunny, and uilleann piper Liam O'Flynn. The album, Prosperous, was recorded by Bill Leader who had brought his mobile recording unit (a Revox tape machine and two microphones) to Ireland in the summer of 1971. Rehearsals took place at Irvine's flat in Dublin and the recordings were made in Prosperous, County Kildare, down in the cellar of Downings House, owned by Moore's sister and brother-in-law, Anne and Davoc Rynne.

In his annotated book of songs, first published in 2000, Moore recalls:

It was a magical time. The music was fresh and it sparkled. Every day brought new fun as we rollicked about Pat Dowling's pub and then up to Rynne's cellar to lay down another track. [...] I was jubilant to be playing with Dónal, Andy and Liam and their enthusiasm showed the feelings were mutual.

— Christy Moore, One Voice.

In the words of Colin Irwin:

Prosperous took the suggestions offered by Sweeney's Men and sprinted off with them. [...] Here, Liam O'Flynn's dexterous pipering merged blissfully with Andy Irvine's mandolin and Dónal Lunny's rhythmic bouzouki to form a complex, beautiful diversion for the voice of Christy Moore.

— Colin Irwin, In Search of the Craíc.

This was released as an album by Moore, but the four musicians soon thereafter formed Planxty in January 1972, to be managed by Des Kelly.

==== Planxty ====
After honing their live set at Slattery's, they played two concerts, afternoon and evening, at Newbridge College on Thursday, 16 March 1972. Donovan was in the audience and invited Planxty to open for him on his six-date Irish tour the following week, during which their first major performance—at the Hangar in Galway—was a huge success. Neither the audience nor the band knew what to expect, and both were pleasantly surprised. Irvine, unable to see the audience through the glare of the stage lights, was worried that the crowd might be on the verge of rioting. It took him several minutes to realise that what he was hearing was the expression of their enthusiastic response to the band's music. On 21 April 1972, Planxty embarked on their first tour of England, which had been booked previously by Moore, and played small folk clubs in Manchester, Bolton, Leeds, Hull, Barnsley, Blackpool, Newcastle, Chester and London, to great acclaim, returning to Ireland in May.

The group would go on to sign a six-record contract and to tour extensively throughout Europe. They played mostly traditional songs and tunes, but several were Irvine compositions, making him the lone composer of the band. Instrumentally the group was notable for the intricate bouzouki and mandolin counterpoint of Lunny and Irvine, along with O'Flynn's exceptional pipering; Irvine and Moore (who played guitar) were the principal vocalists. Very quickly, Lunny would also develop into their own in-house producer, arranger and musical director: "It very rapidly established itself that the music demanded to be treated on its own terms. It influenced our arrangements. [...] I think it was unfamiliar to people to hear traditional music with a chassis under it and it still sounds like traditional music."

Together, they addressed the art of arrangement rather than the formula of genre. And their diversity wasn't just defined by the instrumentation and influences, but also by the variation of time signatures and the creation of counterpoint melodies. They balanced this innovation with a delicate empathy for the music and with old-fashioned musical virtues such as thoughtful singing and intricate playing. As an acoustic band, they generated their own electricity [...], their live shows have a roof-raising dynamic that can match the best rock or electric folk groups.

— Leagues O'Toole, The Humours of Planxty.

Irvine contributed four songs to their first album, Planxty, recorded at the Command Studios in London during early September 1972 and released in early 1973: "Arthur McBride", "West Coast of Clare", "The Jolly Beggar", and "The Blacksmith".

Their second album, The Well Below The Valley was recorded at Escape Studios in Kent, England, from 18 June 1973 until the end of the month, and released the same year. It features three songs by Irvine: "Pat Reilly", "As I Roved Out", and "Time Will Cure Me".

After the completion of this album, Planxty embarked on their first tour of Germany, where the group had become very popular. They also toured extensively in Ireland and were making more frequent trips abroad to festivals in Brittany and in England, at the Durham Folk Festival and the Cambridge Folk Festival. At the start of September 1973, Lunny resigned after playing his last gig with the band at the Edinburgh Festival. He was replaced by Johnny Moynihan.

Rehearsals for Planxty's third album, Cold Blow and the Rainy Night, began in the summer of 1974 at Moynihan's family summer home in Rush, on the north coast of County Dublin. At Irvine's behest, Lunny was co-opted back into the band to arrange the selected material and to play on the album, which was recorded in Sarm Studios, Whitechapel, London during August 1974 and released the same year. It includes four pieces by Irvine: "Johnny Cope", "Băneasă's Green Glade", "Mominsko Horo", and "The Green Fields of Canada".

After the completion of this third album, Moore resigned and was replaced by Strabane native Paul Brady. The band's new line-up (Irvine, O'Flynn, Moynihan, and Brady) toured extensively but released no recordings, breaking up after playing their final show in Brussels on 5 December 1975.

==== Duo with Paul Brady – Andy Irvine/Paul Brady ====
Irvine continued to tour with Brady, including a series of concerts in the USA in 1977 (Irvine's first ever visit there) highlighted by a very successful gig at the Town Hall in New York. Irvine was also invited by Alec Finn to join De Dannan after Dolores Keane had left, but he soon had to relinquish this new venture because of scheduling conflicts. Nonetheless, Irvine performed with De Dannan at 'The 3rd Irish Folk Festival' in Germany on 30 April 1976, playing "Martinmas Time/Danny O'Brien's Hornpipe", "Maíre Rua/Hardiman The Fiddler", "The Emigrant's Farewell", "The Boys of Ballysodare" and "The Plains of Kildare".

In August 1976, Irvine and Brady recorded an album together at the Rockfield Studios, Andy Irvine/Paul Brady, produced by Lunny who also plays on most tracks, and with Kevin Burke on fiddle; it was released in December 1976 by Mulligan Music Ltd. This album included "Autumn Gold", on which Irvine commented: "Written in Ljubljana in 1968, while sitting in a sunny park, stood up on a date. Waiting, as ever, for Vida." It is the final song of a quartet written during his sojourn in Eastern Europe during 1968–69, after spending several months in the Slovenian capital.

The 40th anniversary of the album's release was celebrated by a tour of Ireland scheduled for May 2017, featuring the original personnel: Irvine, Brady, Lunny and Burke. The tour visited: Cork, Dublin, Derry, Limerick, Galway and Belfast. During October 2018, the anniversary tour was repeated with one-night concerts in Dublin, Cork, London and Prague.

==== Duo with Mick Hanly – As I Went Over Blackwater ====
Irvine also toured extensively in Europe with Mick Hanly, including at 'The 4th Irish Folk Festival' in Germany on 30 April 1977. They started their set with Irvine performing a full version of "Johnny Cope": first the song, followed by the 6-part hornpipe of the same name, which Irvine played complete on bouzouki. Hanly then sang "A Kiss in the Morning Early". Irvine followed with "Bonny Woodhall", accompanying himself on Fylde 'Octavius' bouzouki (with the bottom two courses strung in octave). This recording of "Bonny Woodhall" is Irvine's interpretation of "Bonny Woodha'" (H476 in Sam Henry's Songs of the People) and would later appear as a bonus track on the CD version of Rainy Sundays... Windy Dreams. Their set ends with Hanly singing "John Barleycorn" and "The Verdant Braes of Skreen".

The following year, Irvine and Hanly were joined on stage by Liam O'Flynn at 'The 5th Irish Folk Festival' in Germany on 28 April 1978, playing "I Buried My Wife And Danced on Top of Her", a jig learnt from uilleann piper Willie Clancy; "Molly Bawn", sung by Hanly (with Irvine on hurdy-gurdy first, then on bouzouki); "Brian O'Lynn/Sean Bun"; "I Courted A Wee Girl"; "The Longford Weaver" sung by Irvine accompanying himself on hurdy-gurdy and harmonica; and "Masters Return/Kittie's Wedding".

Two years later, in 1980, Hanly released his second solo album As I Went Over Blackwater, featuring Irvine on four tracks: "Jack Haggerty" (harmonicas), "The Guerriere and The Constitution" (harmony vocals and hurdy-gurdy), "Every Circumstance" (mandolin) and "Miss Bailey/Jessica's Polka" (harmonica).

==== The Gathering ====
Sometime during 1977, Irvine also recorded The Gathering, along with Paul Brady, Dónal Lunny, Matt Molloy, Tommy Potts, Tríona Ní Dhomhnaill and uilleann piper Peter Browne. This album was funded by Diane Meek, a Guggenheim heiress who had used the pseudonym "Hamilton" as her maiden name to disguise her wealth. She was the owner of Tradition Records and a patron of traditional music in Dublin at the time. She had lent Mulligan Records money in the early days and had also formed a small record label for traditional music called Srutháin [a stream], on which she had intended to release The Gathering. However, the album was finally released in 1981 on Greenhays, a label connected with Rounder Records.

Irvine contributed two songs to the album: "There's Sure To Be A Row", and "The Mall of Lismore". He also plays mandolin and harmonica on Paul Brady's cover of "Heather on the Moor", a song learned from Eddie Butcher.

==== Paul Brady – Welcome Here Kind Stranger ====
On Friday 21 July 1978, Brady launched his album Welcome Here Kind Stranger with a concert in the auditorium of Liberty Hall in Dublin. He decided to record the concert on his own domestic Akai reel-to-reel tape machine with Brian Masterson in attendance, who had engineered the album and was doing the sound that night.

Performing with him were: Lunny, O'Flynn, Paddy Glackin, Matt Molloy, Noel Hill and Irvine, who played on nine of the ten numbers performed that night: "Paddy's Green Shamrock Shore" (harmonica, mandolin); "I Am A Youth That's Inclined To Ramble" (hurdy-gurdy); "The Creel/Out The Door And Over The Wall" (mandolin, bouzouki); "The Jolly Soldier/The Blarney Pilgrim" (harmonica, bouzouki); "Mary And The Soldier" (mandolin, harmonica); "Jackson And Jane" (hurdy-gurdy); "Don't Come Again" (mandolin); "The Lakes Of Pontchartrain" (bouzouki); "The Crooked Road To Dublin" (Portuguese guitarra with 8 tuners [4 removed], re-strung with 4 courses and tuned like a mandola).

After the concert, Brady took the tapes home and only found them again in November 2000, still in good enough condition to be transferred onto CD and released, in 2002, under the title The Missing Liberty Tapes.

==== Planxty – After The Break ====
By the autumn of 1978, Moore was ready to re-form the original Planxty line-up, complete with Lunny, who brought along flutist Matt Molloy from The Bothy Band, and rehearsals began on Tuesday, 19 September 1978. Their new manager, Kevin Flynn, then organised a mammoth European tour for the following year, from 15 April to 11 June 1979, during which the band played forty-seven concerts in fifty-eight days, in the UK, Germany, Switzerland, Belgium, France and Ireland.

After the tour, the band went to Windmill Lane Studios from 18 to 30 June 1979 to record their fourth album: After The Break, released the same year. Irvine contributed three pieces to the album: "You Rambling Boys of Pleasure", "The Rambling Siúler", and "Smeceno Horo".

After recording the album, Planxty resumed touring more sporadically, playing The National in Kilburn, a handful of dates in Belgium and France, and also headlining the third Ballisodare Festival. Molloy left Planxty to join The Chieftains in the autumn of 1979.

=== 1980s: Solo album, Planxty, Parallel Lines, Mosaic, Patrick Street ===
==== Rainy Sundays... Windy Dreams ====
At the end of 1979, Irvine recorded his first solo album at Windmill Lane Studios in Dublin: Rainy Sundays... Windy Dreams, produced by Dónal Lunny and released on Tara Records in 1980. Personnel included Irvine, Lunny, O'Flynn, Brady (guitar and piano), Frankie Gavin (fiddle), Rick Epping (accordion, harmonica, jaw harp), John Wadham (bongo and congas), Paul Barrett (Fender Rhodes and Polymoog), Keith Donald (soprano sax) and Lucienne Purcell (vocals).

This first solo album showcased songs and tunes from two of his main influences: side one (on the vinyl LP) featured pieces inspired by Irish traditional music, and side two choices concentrated on Balkan music. The original, vinyl album closed with the self-penned "Rainy Sundays", a nostalgic song reminiscing about Vida, with whom Irvine pursued "a one-sided romance in Ljubljana years ago."

==== High Kings of Tara ====
In 1980, Tara Records released High Kings of Tara, a compilation album showcasing tracks previously released by some of its artists: Shaun Davey, Oisín, Jolyon Jackson, Paddy Glackin, Paddy Keenan, Stockton's Wing and Christy Moore.

This album also included five previously unreleased tracks by Planxty, Irvine and Moore. Two of these, Irvine's "The Bonny Light Horseman" and a set of reels by Planxty, "Lord McDonald/The Chattering Magpie", were subsequently added to the CD version of After The Break. The remaining three tracks were: "General Monroe" – a traditional song re-arranged by Irvine (bouzouki, harmonica) in duet with Lunny (guitar); "First Slip/Hardyman The Fiddler A&B/The Yellow Wattle" – a set of jigs by Planxty, including Matt Molloy; and "John of Dreams" – a ballad by Moore, which was later re-released on the CD version of The Iron Behind the Velvet.

==== Planxty – The Woman I loved So Well ====
On 28 February 1980, Planxty headlined the Sense of Ireland concert at the Royal Albert Hall in London. When they returned to Ireland, they recorded two programmes for RTÉ at the Pavilion Theatre in Dún Laoghaire, then started rehearsals at Kilkea Castle in Castledermot, County Kildare with two musicians from County Clare: concertina player Noel Hill and fiddler Tony Linnane. This six-member formation of Moore, Irvine, Lunny, O'Flynn, Hill and Linnane were joined by Matt Molloy and keyboardist Bill Whelan, to record the band's fifth album, The Woman I Loved So Well, at Windmill Lane Studios over two periods: 23–29 April and 16–19 May. The album was wrapped up with a reception at Windmill Lane Studios on 9 June and released on Tara Records in July 1980. Irvine contributed three songs to the album: "Roger O'Hehir", "Kellswater", and "Johnny of Brady's Lea".

Planxty then resumed touring as a four-piece again during the summer of 1980, playing a tour of Italian castles in July and returning to The Boys of Ballisodare festival on 9 August, where they were joined by Whelan and a young Cork fiddler, Nollaig Casey. Shows around this time would feature the quartet for the first set, with Whelan and Casey joining in for the second set. This sextet played a week of shows at the Olympia Theatre in Dublin on 18–23 August 1980, which was recorded for a potential live album that eventually emerged in 1987 as the unlicensed release The Best of Planxty Live. The same sextet also played a series of one-off events, including at the Hammersmith Odeon in March 1981, and recorded a suite called "Timedance"—with full orchestra and rhythm section—which was also performed during the interval of the Eurovision Song Contest, held in Dublin on 4 April 1981. "Timedance" was the genesis of what Whelan would later compose for Riverdance.

==== Parallel Lines with Dick Gaughan ====
In his online autobiography, Irvine recalls:

After one of these tours [in 1980], I went into a recording studio in Northeim, Germany to record an album called Folk Friends 2 – others had already made number one. Assembled were my old friends Jack Elliott and Derroll Adams, Alex Campbell, Dick Gaughan, Dolores Keane and John Faulkner and many others. That was some week! [...] We recorded in different combinations and I recorded "Thousands Are Sailing" with Dick which would lead to our making an album together a year later: Parallel Lines.

— Andy Irvine, Andy's History – Chapter 6.

In August 1981, Irvine and Gaughan recorded Parallel Lines at Günter Pauler's Tonstudio in St Blasien/Herrenhaus, Northeim, Germany, released in 1982 on the German FolkFreak-Platten label. It was produced by Gaughan, Irvine and Carsten Linde, with a line-up including Gaughan (acoustic and electric guitars, bass guitar and vocal), Irvine (bouzouki, mandola, mandolin, harmonica, hurdy-gurdy and vocal), Nollaig Casey (fiddle), Martin Buschmann (saxophone), Judith Jaenicke (flute) and Bob Lenox (Fender Rhodes piano). Dónal Lunny also overdubbed the fiddle parts and remixed the album at Lombard Sound Studios in Dublin.

In 1997, Parallel Lines was re-issued on CD, including "Thousands Are Sailing" as a bonus track that Irvine and Gaughan had recorded during the above-mentioned Folk Friends 2 recording sessions, held in 1980.

About the recording of Parallel Lines, Irvine would later comment:

We had had a couple of rehearsals in Dick's place in Leith and my place in Dublin but mainly of my songs as Dick didn't really decide what he would sing till we got to Germany. He did a fantastic job on my material. The more so because this was my 'really really complicated' period! Whenever we meet, we always make plans to do another one! Don't know if it will ever happen...

— Andy Irvine, Sweet Combinations of Sound – Irish Folk Legend Andy Irvine by Kevin Moist.

Irvine and Gaughan did, however, perform live at Whelan's venue in Dublin on Wednesday 2 February 2011, nearly thirty years after recording Parallel Lines.

==== Planxty – Words and Music ====
The Planxty sextet continued to tour, but began to drift apart. In 1980, O'Flynn recorded The Brendan Voyage with Shaun Davey. Moore and Lunny, eager to experiment with a rhythm section and a different, more political song set, formed Moving Hearts in 1981. Lunny also kept busy producing albums by other artists. As a result of all these parallel projects, the original quartet would end up playing their last show together on 24 August 1982, at the National Stadium in Dublin.

Nevertheless, Planxty—with Whelan and Casey still on board—reconvened at Windmill Lane Studios in late October and early November 1982, to record Words & Music, which also featured fiddler James Kelly and Moving Hearts bass guitarist Eoghan O'Neill. It was released on the WEA label in 1983. Irvine contributed three pieces to the album: "Thousands Are Sailing", "Accidentals", and "Aragon Mill".

A final line-up that Irvine dubbed "Planxty-Too-Far"—Irvine, O'Flynn, Whelan, Arty McGlynn on guitar, James Kelly on fiddle and singer Dolores Keane, but without Casey—undertook a UK tour on Friday, 1 April 1983, followed by a series of live engagements in Ireland, an appearance on the Late Late Show and some eight shows, including the National Stadium in Dublin on 27 April 1983. Two days later, Irvine went on tour in the Balkans and, on his return in mid-June, found that: "to my surprise, the band hadn't actually split up, it has just fallen asunder. An unfortunate ending to the second coming...".

==== After Planxty ====
Irvine resumed his solo career, playing occasionally with McGlynn and Casey, and also travelled to Hungary, where he played and fraternised with local musicians:

I had met a number of people in Hungary by this time, whose careers bore a comparison with my own. I mean city people in Budapest who had discovered their folk music, gone out to collect it and formed bands to play it. First I met Kolinda with the beautiful voice of Ágnes Zsigimondi [sic] and then I ran into Muzsikás, who would become my firm friends. I started to play there a lot. I loved the place. I lost my heart to many things there!

— Andy Irvine, Biography – Chapter 7.

The singer from Muzsikás, Márta Sebestyén, would soon thereafter be joining Irvine's next multicultural folk group: Mosaic. He also met multi-instrumentalist Nikola Parov (Sebestyén's then husband), who would go on to participate in several of Irvine's projects, the first being the album East Wind (1992), which featured Sebestyén. Irvine would later write a song about this period of his life in Budapest: "The Wind Blows Over The Danube", released on the album Changing Trains.

==== Mosaic ====
In the winter of 1984, Irvine gathered a collection of musicians from throughout Europe and formed Mosaic, with a line-up including Irvine, Dónal Lunny along with his former Moving Hearts associate, uilleann piper Declan Masterson, Danish bassist and singer Lissa Ladefoged, Dutch guitarist and singer Hans Theessink, and singer Márta Sebestyén.

Their first public gig was in Budapest on 12 July 1985, followed by a further two gigs in Hungary and an appearance at the Dranouter festival in Belgium in early August, prior to their English tour. Their seventh gig was billed at the Southport Arts Center, which Chris Hardwick of Folk Roots reviewed with the following introduction: "Every once in a while the folk scene throws up a new permutation in which exceptionally gifted individuals come together to produce something so innovative and exhilarating that it goes way beyond the sum of the parts".

Their set included: Stan Rogers's "Northwest Passage", an unspecified Macedonian dance tune ("one of Andy's 90 mph specials"), a solo Hungarian love song from Sebestyén, a brooding cover of Eric Von Schmidt's Caribbean lament "Joshua Gone Barbados" from Theessink, the Irish three (Irvine, Lunny and Masterson) on a set of reels including "The Spike Island Lasses", and Irvine singing Andy Mitchell's "Indiana". However, the band lasted only that one summer.

A couple of years later, Irvine stated that he would have liked to try the experiment again by concentrating on the Irish and East European sound without bringing in the blues influence.

==== Patrick Street ====
Also in 1985, Irvine joined up with fiddler Kevin Burke and guitarist Mícheál Ó Domhnaill (who had been gigging together around America for some time) and toured as a trio in the USA; when Ó Domhnaill wasn't available for some of the dates, guitarist/vocalist Gerry O'Beirne stepped in. "This tour was such fun and so successful that we decided to expand the outfit into a four-piece by adding Jackie Daly", Irvine wrote.

Initially billed on a 1986 American tour as "The Legends of Irish Music", they soon chose to call themselves Patrick Street. The line-up for the band underwent several changes, but always included Irvine, Burke, and Daly. The guitar role, however, passed:

- from O'Beirne to Arty McGlynn – before the recording of their first album, Patrick Street, which began in August 1986;
- from McGlynn to Ged Foley – after the band recorded their fourth album, All in Good Time, released in 1993;
- back to McGlynn – when they resumed touring after the completion of their ninth album, On the Fly, released in 2007.

After Jackie Daly retired from Patrick Street, John Carty joined on fiddle, flute and tenor banjo in time to record On The Fly.

Originally agreed to as a part-time band, they have nevertheless recorded eight studio albums together, plus one live album (Live from Patrick Street) and two compilations (The Best of Patrick Street and Compendium: The Best of Patrick Street).

On their first album, Patrick Street, released in 1986, Irvine sings four songs: "Patrick Street", "The Holy Ground", "The Dream/Indiana", and "The Man with the Cap".

No. 2 Patrick Street, released in 1988, again features four songs sung by Irvine: "Tom Joad"; "Facing the Chair"; "Braes of Moneymore", to which Irvine changed the tune and added a verse; and "William Taylor"

Their third album, Irish Times, released in 1990, includes three songs by Irvine: "Brackagh Hill"; "Forgotten Hero", his composition about Michael Davitt; and "The Humours of the King of Ballyhooley".

==== Playing style – The Irish Bouzouki ====
In 1989, Irvine's style of playing the bouzouki was summarised thus in The Irish Bouzouki, an instructional guide:

Andy plays the bouzouki in a very melodic style, using a lot of sustain. He creates this by hitting the strings individually, allowing them to ring rather than using heavy chording. His style involves using intricate counter-melody which greatly fills out the sound, especially when used in a duet or group situation using two bouzoukis or bouzouki and mandolin. Good examples of this can be found on Planxty albums or Andy's solo album, Rainy Sundays... Windy Dreams. Andy is constantly experimenting, trying to find new sounds. He searches for new chords or chord formations, plays a guitar-shaped bouzouki and uses a wound or covered second (A) string which results in a much mellower, sweeter tone.

— Niall Ó Callanain & Tommy Walsh, The Irish Bouzouki.

The tutor also provided simple standard notation scores and lyrics for two of Irvine's songs: "Brackagh Hill" (which he recorded with Patrick Street on the album Irish Times released the same year) and "Bridget", a song written by Jane Cassidy which he never released elsewhere. The cassette accompanying this tutor provided both songs, with Irvine accompanying himself on bouzouki. In the same tutor, Irvine's Irish bouzouki tuning (GDAD', one octave lower than similarly open-tuned mandolin) was also contrasted with the traditional Greek bouzouki tuning (CFAD').

In a 1985 interview with the American Frets magazine, Irvine had explained the origins of his bouzouki tuning:

From the bottom string, I tune it G-D-A-D, a Johnny Moynihan mandolin tuning. The point being that if we were playing in G or D, there was a top string that could be struck at will. It goes back to Woody Guthrie by way of the Carter Family for me. If you want to play a brush-style Carter family stroke, you need to have that top string able to complement any chord.

— Andy Irvine, Celtic Roots... Dustbowl Inspiration by Joe Vanderford.

=== 1990s: Solo albums, East Wind, Patrick Street ===
==== Rude Awakening ====
In December 1990 and January 1991, Irvine recorded his second solo album, Rude Awakening, produced by Bill Whelan. The line-up included Whelan (keyboards), Rens van der Zalm (fiddle, mandolin, guitar), Carl Geraghty (soprano saxophone), Arty McGlynn (guitar), Davy Spillane (whistle) and Fionnuala Sherry (fiddle). The album was released on Green Linnet Records, later in 1991.

It features "Never Tire of the Road", Irvine's tribute song to Woody Guthrie, alongside mainly self-penned material celebrating some of his other heroes: Raoul Wallenberg, James Connolly, Emiliano Zapata, Michael Dwyer, Douglas Mawson, Aeneas Mackintosh and Sinclair Lewis. The only other traditional song is "Allan McLean". The sleeve notes of "Love To Be With You" show a faded, black & white photo of Vida, the heroine of his song from ten years earlier: "Rainy Sundays".

==== East Wind ====
Irvine had also played some Balkan tunes to Whelan and mentioned his aspiration to record them. So, shortly thereafter, he was rehearsing again with Davy Spillane (uilleann pipes and low whistle) to record East Wind, a collection of Bulgarian and Macedonian tunes played Irish-style and produced by Whelan, who also contributed keyboards and piano.

The project influenced Riverdance:

It is significant, also, that Bill Whelan had been working as a producer of [an] album about two years before Riverdance. It was called East Wind and that entire album was comprised of East European music. Its making can be ascribed to combining the talents of Davy Spillane and Andy Irvine, and its geographic origins can be ascribed to Irvine who introduced the East European tempo and style onto the Irish traditional scene.

— Barra O'Cinnéide, Riverdance: The Phenomenon.

The extensive line-up included Nikola Parov on Bulgarian instruments (gadulka, kaval, gaida) & bouzouki, Máirtín O'Connor (accordion), Noel Eccles & Paul Moran (percussion), Tony Molloy (bass), Carl Geraghty & Kenneth Edge (saxophones), John Sheahan (fiddle), Anthony Drennan (guitar), Mícheál Ó Súilleabháin (piano), Márta Sebestyén (vocals) and Rita Connolly (backing vocals).

In an interview with Folk Roots in August 1992, Irvine stated: "We finished it eighteen months ago but [...] John Cook at Tara wanted to try the avenue of big companies." The album was eventually released on the Tara label itself in mid-1992.

For a while, Irvine and Parov were joined by Rens van der Zalm and toured together in Europe as the 'East Wind Trio', and then again in the US during 1996.

==== Patrick Street – All in Good Time ====
Irvine contributed six pieces to Patrick Street's fourth album, All in Good Time, released in 1993: "A Prince Among Men (Only a Miner)"; Lintheads, a trilogy comprising: "The Pride of the Springfield Road", "Lawrence Common", and "Goodbye, Monday Blues"; "Carrowclare"; and "The Girls Along the Road".

==== Patrick Street – Cornerboys ====
Patrick Street's fifth album, Cornerboys, was released in 1996 and includes seven pieces provided by Irvine: "Sweet Lisbweemore"; "Morlough Shore"; Pity the Poor Hare (a suite comprising: "On Yonder Hill", "Merrily Tripping O'er The Plain", "The Kilgrain Hare", and "Pity the Poor Hare"); and "Down By Greer's Grove".

==== Rain on the Roof ====
Recorded in June, July and August 1996, Irvine's third solo album, Rain on the Roof, is the closest the listener could get to the experience of attending one of his gigs. It was the first release (product number "AK-1") on his own label, Andy Irvine. The album mixes some of Irvine's compositions with traditional songs and Bulgarian tunes. As he explains in the sleeve notes:

Most of the recordings on this CD were done as if live. I sat in front of microphones with my bouzouki or mandolin in my lap, my harmonica in its holder round my neck, and my drone volume pedal on the floor, under my foot, and played and sang all in one go.

— Sleeve notes from Andy Irvine – Rain on the Roof.

Other instruments were added (on four of the eleven tracks) by Rens van der Zalm (fiddle and mandolin), Stephen Cooney (didgeridoo, Kpanlogo drum), Declan Masterson (low whistle) and Irvine himself, who played a second mandolin on two of the tracks.

==== Patrick Street – Made in Cork ====
Patrick Street's sixth album, Made in Cork, was released in 1997, to which Irvine contributed four songs: "Her Mantle So Green", "Rainbow 'Mid The Willows", "Spanking Maggie from the Ross", and "When Adam Was in Paradise", another song he learned from the singing of Eddie Butcher.

==== Patrick Street – Live from Patrick Street ====
Live from Patrick Street, released in 1999, was Patrick Street's seventh album, recorded during a tour of Ireland and Britain in November 1998. It features five of Irvine's songs: "Braes of Moneymore", Eddie Butcher's "My Son in Amerikay", "Wild Rover No More", "Stewball and the Monaghan Grey Mare", and "The Holy Ground".

=== 2000s: Solo album, Mozaik, Patrick Street, Planxty, Marianne Green ===
==== Way Out Yonder ====
In 2000, Irvine released his fourth solo album, Way Out Yonder, recorded between July and December 1999 and co-produced with Steve Cooney.

Irvine was joined by Rens van der Zalm (guitar, fiddle, mandolin, Bulgarian tambura and bass guitar), Lindsey Horner (double bass), Máire Breatnach (viola), Cormac Breatnach (low whistle), Steve Cooney (Spanish guitar, percussion and kalimba), Declan Masterson (uilleann pipes and low whistle), Liam O'Flynn (uilleann pipes and tin whistle), Nikola Parov (gadulka), Brendan Power (harmonica), plus Lynn Kavanagh, Mandy Murphy and Phil Callery (backing vocals).

==== Mozaik – Live from the Powerhouse ====
On 1 March 2002, the seaside town of Rye, Victoria in Australia witnessed the formation and six-day marathon rehearsals of multicultural group Mozaik—not to be confused with his earlier, similarly named group Mosaic—featuring Irvine, Dónal Lunny, Bruce Molsky, Nikola Parov and Rens van der Zalm.

The Australian tour that followed culminated in two gigs recorded at the Brisbane Powerhouse on 30/31 March and released on the album Live from the Powerhouse in 2004, under license to Compass Records.

==== Patrick Street – Street Life ====
Patrick Street's eighth album, Street Life, was released in 2002. Irvine contributed four pieces: "Barna Hill", "Down in Matewan", "Lost Indian", and "Green Grows the Laurel".

==== Planxty ("The Third Coming") – Live 2004 ====
In late 2002, broadcaster and journalist Leagues O'Toole was working as presenter and researcher for the RTÉ television show No Disco and persuaded the programme editor, Rory Cobbe, to develop a one-off documentary about Planxty.

O'Toole proceeded with interviewing Moore, Irvine and O'Flynn but Lunny, who was living in Japan, was unavailable. After also shooting links at key landmarks from the Planxty history, the programme aired on 3 March 2003, receiving a phenomenal response from the public and some very positive feedback from the Planxty members themselves. In a final comment about the constant speculation of the original line-up regrouping, Moore had stated, on camera: "There's nobody longs for it more than myself and the other three guys. Definitely the time is right. Let's go for it".

A few months later, Paddy Doherty, owner of the Royal Spa Hotel in Lisdoonvarna (and co-founder of the Lisdoonvarna Music Festival), arranged for the band's use of the hotel's old dining room for rehearsals, which led to a one-off concert there in front of 200 people on 11 October 2003. Moore, on stage, credited the No Disco documentary with inspiring the reunion.

Pleased with the results and the experience of playing together again, the original Planxty quartet agreed to the longed-for reunion (dubbed "The Third Coming") and would perform together again, on and off, for a period of just over a year.

Planxty first played a series of concerts at the Glór Theatre in Ennis, County Clare (on 23 & 24 January 2004) and at Vicar Street in Dublin (on 30 & 31 January and on 4 & 5, 11 & 12 February 2004), which were recorded and from which selected material was released on the CD Live 2004 and its associated DVD.

In late 2004 and early 2005, another round of concerts took place at the following venues:

- Radisson SAS Hotel in Galway (6, 7 and 8 October 2004);
- Point Theatre in Dublin (28, 29 and 30 December 2004, plus extra dates on 3, 4 and 5 January 2005);
- Waterfront Hall in Belfast (19, 20 and 21 January 2005);
- Barbican Centre in London (29, 30 and 31 January 2005).

The original Planxty quartet never performed live again, nor recorded new material together. Liam O'Flynn died in 2018.

==== Solo version of "As I Roved Out" ====
In May 2005, Irvine wrote in his website journal: "Also premiered "As I Roved Out" with my own accompaniment. It's always been a Planxty number till now with Dónal playing Baritone Guitar and me just singing it." A recording of this version of "As I Roved Out" was eventually released on Peter Ratzenbeck's album Resonances in 2007, where Irvine appeared as a guest and played it solo on his "Stefan Sobell mandola, tuned CGDG (Capo 0)".

==== Mozaik – Changing Trains ====
In January and April 2005, Mozaik rehearsed new material for Changing Trains, their first studio album recorded in Budapest during November of the same year.

This album was initially released by the band in Australia in 2006 and, after additional re-mixing by Lunny at Longbeard Studios in Dublin, was re-released in the autumn of 2007 under license to Compass Records.

==== Patrick Street – On the Fly ====
Patrick Street's ninth album, On the Fly, was released in 2007. Irvine provided three songs: "Sergeant Small", "The Rich Irish Lady", and "Erin Go Bragh".

==== Marianne Green – Dear Irish Boy ====
Irvine arranged and produced Marianne Green's debut album, Dear Irish Boy, released in 2009. Personnel included: Marianne Green (vocals), Irvine (bouzouki, mandolin, mandola, bass-bouzouki, harmonica), Colum Sands (double bass, concertina) and Gerry O'Conner (violin).

The tracks are: "The Banks of the Bann" (trad.), "You Make Me Fly" (M. Green), "Tá Mé 'Mo Shuí" (trad.), "The Doffin Mistress" (trad.), "Bonny Portmore" (trad.), "Ar A Ghabháil Go Baile Átha Cliath Damh" (trad.), "Cian's Song" (M. O'Hare), "The Dear Irish Boy" (trad.), "The Wife's Lamentation" (M. Green), "The Road To Dundee" (trad.), "The Wreck of the Newcastle Fishermen" (trad.) and "Carrickmannon Lake" (trad.).

=== 2010s: Solo albums, LAPD, duo with Rens van der Zalm, Usher's Island ===
==== Abocurragh ====
In August 2010, Irvine released his fifth solo album: Abocurragh, recorded in Dublin, Norway, Australia, Hungary and Brittany between February 2009 and April 2010 and produced by Dónal Lunny, who also plays on all but one of the tracks.

They were joined by Liam O'Flynn (uilleann pipes, tin whistle), Nikola Parov (kaval, nyckelharpa), Máirtín O'Connor (accordion), Bruce Molsky (fiddle), Rens van der Zalm (fiddle), Rick Epping (harmonica), Paul Moore (double bass), Graham Henderson (keyboards), Liam Bradley (percussion), Jacky Molard (violas, violins and string arrangement), Annbjørg Lien (hardanger fiddles), Lillebjørn Nilsen (guitar), plus Kate Burke and Ruth Hazleton (backing vocals).

==== LAPD (Liam/Andy/Paddy/Dónal) ====
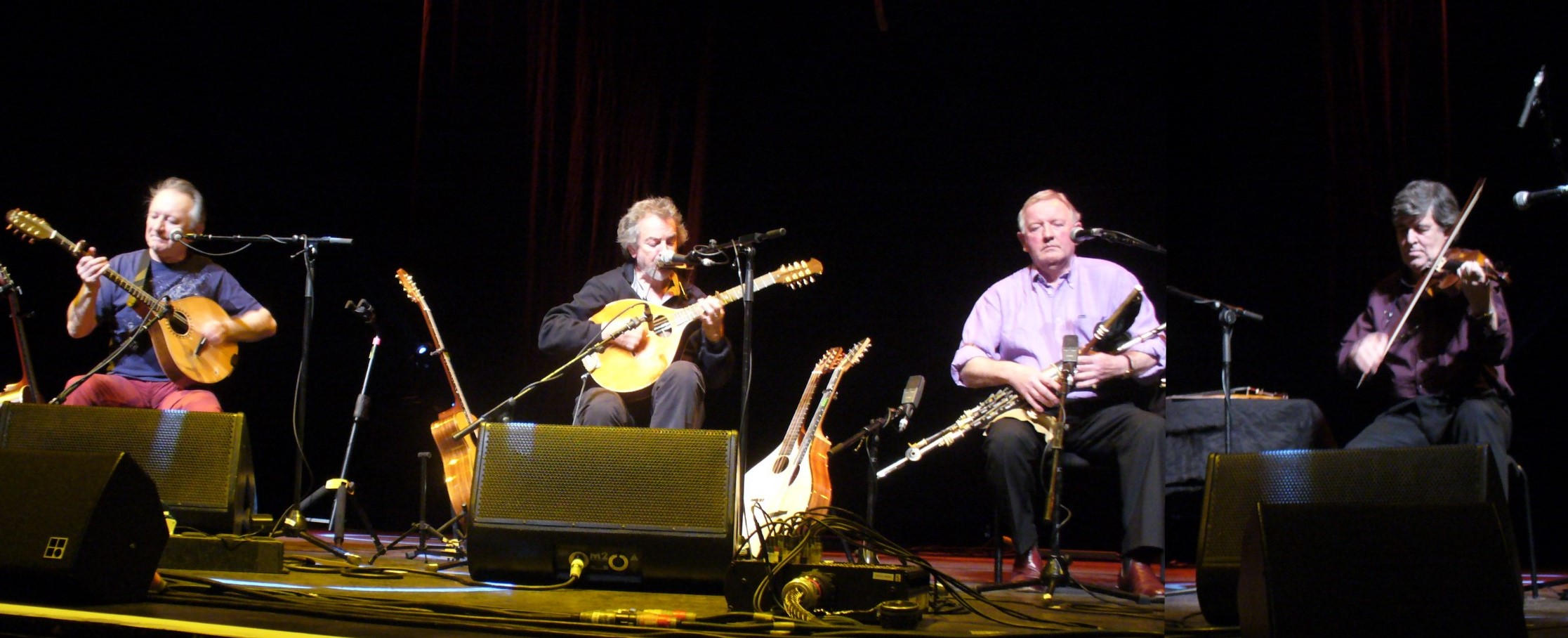
Dónal Lunny, Andy Irvine, Liam O'Flynn and Paddy Glackin as LAPD (March 2012)

Friday, 20 January 2012 ushered in the inaugural gig, at Dublin's Vicar Street, of a quartet named 'LAPD' after the initials of its members' first names: Liam O'Flynn, Andy Irvine, Paddy Glackin, and Dónal Lunny.

They played a set combining tunes and songs from the repertoires of:

- Planxty: "Jenny's Wedding/The Virginia/Garrett Barry's", "Paddy Canny's" ("The Starting Gate"), "The Jolly Beggar/The Wise Maid", "Arthur MacBride", "As I Roved Out (Andy)", "The Blacksmith" and "West Coast of Clare";
- Irvine & Lunny: "My Heart's tonight in Ireland/West Clare Reel", "Braes of Moneymore", "Suleiman's Kopanitsa", "The Dream/Indiana", "O'Donoghue's" and "Siún Ni Dhuibhir";
- O'Flynn & Glackin: "Kitty's Rambles/Humours of Ennistymon", "The Green Island/Bantry Hornpipe", "Young Tom Ennis/Nora Crean", "A Rainy Day/The Shaskeen", "Two Flings", "Speed the Plough/Colonel Fraser" and "The Gold Ring".

LAPD performed only occasionally, to rave reviews, but never recorded before disbanding; their last performance took place at Sligo Live, on Saturday, 26 October 2013.

==== 70th Birthday Concert at Vicar St 2012 ====
On 16 and 17 June 2012, Irvine's 70th birthday was celebrated at Dublin's Vicar Street venue in a pair of concerts. He was joined onstage by Paul Brady and various combinations of members of Sweeney's Men, Planxty, Mozaik and LAPD, plus brothers George and Manoli Galiatsos who came unexpectedly all the way from Athens for the concerts, which were recorded and released on the CD Andy Irvine/70th Birthday Concert at Vicar St 2012 and its associated DVD.

==== Playing Woody Guthrie again ====
A week later, Irvine was invited to participate with Billy Bragg in the Woody 100 Legacy Show scheduled at Dublin's Vicar Street on Monday, 17 September 2012, to celebrate Woody Guthrie's Centenary.

In his web journal, Irvine wrote at the time: "I recently located my old Gibson L0 guitar. It was in the shed where it has been languishing for some years. I used to be able to do a pretty good impression of Woody's 'Church lick' guitar playing. Hope I can get it all back! [...] I'd better get practising!..."

==== Parachilna with Rens van der Zalm ====
On 13 November 2013, Irvine released his first duo album with Rens van der Zalm: Parachilna, an album of Irish and Australian songs recorded live in July 2012 while camping in Parachilna, South Australia and New South Wales.

It was co-produced by Irvine (vocals, bouzouki, mandola and harmonica) and van der Zalm (backing vocals, guitar, mandolin, fiddle and viola), and recorded by Cian Burke in disused buildings using top-quality microphones, a laptop and Pro Tools. Most of the time, there are only two instruments playing–three when Irvine also plays harmonica–and the resulting sound is bright and pristine.

==== Usher's Island ====
On 27 January 2015, Irvine launched his latest musical association at Celtic Connections in Glasgow: a band called Usher's Island (a reference to the Dublin quay), with Dónal Lunny (guitar, bouzouki, bodhrán, keyboards), Paddy Glackin (fiddle), Michael McGoldrick (uilleann pipes, flute and whistle), and John Doyle (guitar).

==== Quilty ====
In 2023, Irvine was invited to join the Swedish folk band Quilty for their 30th anniversary tour. He has continued to perform with the band, playing a mix of Irish and Swedish folk music.

== Selected discography ==
Solo

- Rainy Sundays... Windy Dreams (1980)
- Rude Awakening (1991)
- Rain on the Roof (1996)
- Way Out Yonder (2000)
- Abocurragh (2010)
- Old Dog Long Road – Vol.1 (1961–2012) (2019) – 2 discs
- Old Dog Long Road – Vol.2 (1961–2015) (2020) – 2 discs
- Devoted: Songs of Woody Guthrie (2026)

With Christy Moore

- Prosperous (1971)
- Christy Moore (1976)
- The Iron Behind the Velvet (1978)
- Ordinary Man (1985)

With Paul Brady

- Andy Irvine/Paul Brady (1976)
- Welcome Here Kind Stranger (1978)
- The Missing Liberty Tapes (2002)

With Maddy Prior & June Tabor

- Silly Sisters (1976)

With Mick Hanly

- As I Went Over Blackwater (1980)

With various artists

- The Gathering (1981)

With Dick Gaughan

- Parallel Lines (1982)

With Peter Ratzenbeck

- Over the Years (1990)
- Outremer (1995)
- Travelogue (1997)
- Resonances (2007)

With Davy Spillane

- East Wind (1992)

With Marianne Green

- Dear Irish Boy (2009)

With Rens van der Zalm

- Parachilna (2013)

With Luke Plumb

- Precious Heroes (2017)

With Sweeney's Men

- Sweeney's Men (1968)

With Planxty

- Planxty (1973)
- The Well Below the Valley (1973)
- Cold Blow and the Rainy Night (1974)
- After The Break (1979)
- High Kings of Tara (1980) – Planxty & various artists
- The Woman I Loved So Well (1980)
- Live at Olympia Theatre, Dublin (1980) – Cassette; withdrawn shortly after release
- Words & Music (1983)
- Arís! (1984)
- Live 2004 (2004) – Separate CD and DVD
- Between the Jigs and the Reels: A Retrospective (2016) – CD and DVD combo
- One Night in Bremen (2018)

With Patrick Street

- Patrick Street (1986)
- No. 2 Patrick Street (1988)
- Irish Times (1990)
- All in Good Time (1993)
- The Best of Patrick Street (1995)
- Cornerboys (1996)
- Made in Cork (1997)
- Live from Patrick Street (1999)
- Compendium: The Best of Patrick Street (2000)
- Street Life (2002)
- On the Fly (2007)

With Mozaik

- Live from the Powerhouse (2004)
- Changing Trains (2007)
- The Long And The Short Of It (2019)

With Sweeney's Men, Mozaik, Paul Brady, LAPD

- Andy Irvine/70th Birthday Concert at Vicar St 2012 (2014) – Separate CD and DVD

With Usher's Island

- Usher's Island (2017)

With Lillebjørn Nilsen

- Live In Telemark (2021)

== Filmography ==
- Planxty Live 2004 (2004), DVD
- Come West Along The Road/Irish Traditional Music Treasures From RTÉ Archives 1960s – 1980s (2005), DVD
- Come West Along The Road 2/Irish Traditional Music Treasures From RTÉ Archives 1960s – 1980s (2007), DVD
- From Clare To Here (2008), DVD
- Come West Along The Road 3/Irish Traditional Music Treasures From RTÉ Archives 1960s – 1980s (2010), DVD
- Come West Along The Road/The Collection (2014), DVD (Volumes 1–4 Boxset)
- Ar Stáitse – RTÉ TV Series, DVD
- The Transatlantic Sessions Series 6 (2014), DVD
- Andy Irvine 70th Birthday Concert at Vicar St 2012 (2014), DVD
- Mozaik on Tour 2014 (2014), YouTube video clip
- Planxty Between the Jigs and the Reels: A Retrospective (2016), DVD

== Selected early acting performances ==
The following table shows a selection of acting roles and performances by Andrew Irvine, between 1950 and 1964.

Acting performances (1950–1964) by Andrew Irvine

Title	Year	Show	Date / Episode (TV)	Role	Notes
A Tale of Five Cities	1950	Film	Released 1 Mar 1951	Jimmy	
Round at the Redways	1955	TV	S1/Ep.4, 19 Oct 1955	Nokie	
Round at the Redways	1955	TV	S1/Ep.9, 23 Nov 1955	Nokie	
Round at the Redways	1956	TV	8 Feb 1956	Nokie	
The Magpies	1957	TV	7 Feb 1957	Morgan	by Henry James, adapted by Michael Dyne
Armchair Theatre	1957	TV	Escape to Happiness; 9 Jun 1957	Eric Brandt	
A Voice in Vision	1957	TV	18 Dec 1957	John Logie Baird (as a boy)	
Run to Earth	1958	TV	"Strange Neighbours"; 11 Feb 1958	Archie Almond	
Run to Earth	1958	TV	"Aunt Alexa"; 18 Feb 1958	Archie Almond	
Run to Earth	1958	TV	"Captain Gaunt's Secret"; 25 Feb 1958	Archie Almond	
Run to Earth	1958	TV	"Discovery at Dunoon"; 4 Mar 1958	Archie Almond	
Run to Earth	1958	TV	"Ninian McHarg"; 11 Mar 1958	Archie Almond	
French Without Tears	1958	TV	S1/Ep.12, 7 Jun 1958	Lord Heybrook	by Terence Rattigan
Brouhaha	1958	Stage	27 Aug 1958 – 28 Feb 1959	Pygmy	by George Tabori
Room at the Top	1959	Film	Released 22 Jan 1959 (UK)	Raymond (office boy)	
Judgement in Sunlight	1959	Stage	11 Jan 1959	(Extra)	by Michael Kelly
Ask for King Billy	1959	TV	S1/Ep.4, 24 Nov 1959	Lanky Graham	
A Holiday Abroad	1960	TV	S5/Ep.23, 12 Feb 1960	(Schoolboy)	
Sheep's Clothing	1960	TV	S1/Ep.2, 25 Sep 1960	Dan	
Sheep's Clothing	1960	TV	S1/Ep.3, 2 Oct 1960	Dan	
Sheep's Clothing	1960	TV	S1/Ep.4, 9 Oct 1960	Dan	
The Zoo Story	1963	Stage		Jerry	by Edward Albee
Moytura	1963	Stage	24 Sep–6 Oct 1963	Tethra Irish god of war	by Pádraic Colum
Down at Flannery's	1963	TV	Autumn 1963	?	
Tolka Row	1964	TV	S1/Ep.3, 17 Jan 1964	Jim "Beardie" Toomey	
Tolka Row	1964	TV	S1/Ep.15, 10 Apr 1964	Jim "Beardie" Toomey	
Tolka Row	1964	TV	S1/Ep.16, 17 Apr 1964	Jim "Beardie" Toomey	
Tolka Row	1964	TV	S1/Ep.20, 15 May 1964	Jim "Beardie" Toomey	
Tolka Row	1964	TV	S1/Ep.22, 29 May 1964	Jim "Beardie" Toomey	
Sir Buccaneer	1964	Stage	28 Sep 1964	Sir Peregrine	by Gerry Gallivan

== Awards ==
- 2018: Won the first Lifetime Achievement Award bestowed at RTÉ Radio 1's inaugural Folk Music Awards.

== Bibliography ==
- Harper, Colin (2006) [First published 2000]. Dazzling Stranger: Bert Jansch and the British Folk and Blues Revival (2nd revised ed.). London: Bloomsbury Publishing. ISBN 0-7475-8725-6.
- Huntington, Gale; Herrmann, Lani; Dr Moulden, John, eds. (2010). Sam Henry's Songs of the People. Athens, GA and London: University of Georgia Press. ISBN 978-0-8203-3625-1.
- Irvine, Andy (1988). Aiming for the Heart (1st ed.). Germany: Heupferd Musik Verlag GmbH. ISBN 3-923445-01-6.
- Irvine, Andy (2008) [First published 1988]. Aiming for the Heart: Irish Song Affairs (2nd expanded ed.). Germany: Heupferd Musik Verlag GmbH. ISBN 978-3-923445-05-9.
- Irwin, Colin (2003). In Search of the Craíc. London: André Deutsch. ISBN 0-233-00004-6.
- Kaufman, Will (2011). Woody Guthrie, American Radical. Urbana, Chicago and Springfield: The University of Illinois Press. ISBN 978-0-252-03602-6.
- Moore, Christy (2000). One Voice: My Life In Song. London: Lir/Hodder and Stoughton. ISBN 0-340-76839-8.
- Moore, Christy (2003) [First published 2000]. One Voice (2nd revised ed.). London: Lir/Hodder and Stoughton. ISBN 978-0-340-83073-4.
- Moulden, John (1994). Thousands are sailing: a brief song history of Irish emigration. Portrush, Northern Ireland: Ulstersongs. ISBN 1-898437-01-7.
- Ó Callanain, Niall; Walsh, Tommy (1989). The Irish Bouzouki. Ireland: Waltons. ISBN 0-7866-1595-8.
- O'Toole, Leagues (2006). The Humours of Planxty. Ireland: Hodder Headline. ISBN 0-340-83796-9.
- Planxty (Songbook; 1973), London: Mews Music.
- Wearing, J.P. (27 March 2014) [First published 1976]. The London Stage 1920-1929: A Calendar of Productions, Performers, and Personnel (2nd revised ed.). Lanham, MD: Rowman & Littlefield Education. ISBN 978-0-8108-9301-6.
- Wearing, J.P. (16 September 2014) [First published 1976]. The London Stage 1950-1959: A Calendar of Productions, Performers, and Personnel (2nd revised ed.). Lanham, MD: Rowman & Littlefield Education. ISBN 978-0-8108-9307-8.

== See also ==
- Eddie Butcher
- List of Irish theatres and theatre companies
- Sam Henry
