= Sam Henry (musicologist) =

Irish journalist and musicologist (1870–1952)

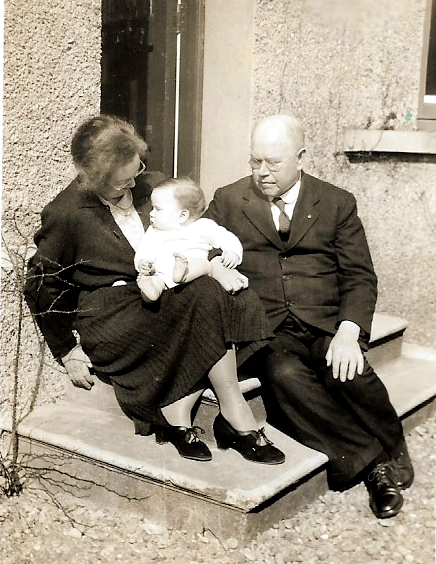
- Henry with his wife
- Born: Samuel Henry; 9 May 1878; Coleraine, Ireland
- Died: 23 May 1952 (aged 74)
- Occupations: customs officer, pension officer, antiquarian, lecturer, writer, photographer, musician, folklorist, folk-song collector
- Children: Olive Mary Henry Craig

Samuel Henry (9 May 1878 – 23 May 1952) was an Irish customs officer, pension officer, antiquarian, lecturer, writer, photographer, folklorist, folk-song collector and musician.

He is best known for his collection of ballads and songs in Songs of the People, the largest and most comprehensive collection of just under 690 folk-songs from Northern Ireland assembled between the wars (1923–1939), when he was song editor for the Northern Constitution, a weekly newspaper in Coleraine.

== Early life ==
Henry was born and educated in Sandleford, Coleraine, Ireland. He came from a prominent Coleraine family and was the youngest of five sons: his brother William was town clerk of Coleraine; Robert, principal of the Model School; James, vice principal of The Honourable The Irish Society's Primary School; and Tom, a civil servant. In 1897, when he was 19, Sam passed two examinations, one as teacher and the other as an exciseman, choosing to follow the latter career.

== Description ==
According to his daughter, Mrs Olive Mary Henry Craig, Henry was a "very large man, tall, broad and burly" who weighed over sixteen stone (225 pounds, over 100 kilograms). He rode a bicycle and also used a car in his travels around the northern counties, as well as the public transport system (bus and train). Henry described himself as "an ardent amateur naturalist, archaeologist, antiquarian, genealogist, and photographer." He was a Fellow of the Royal Society of Antiquaries of Ireland and could therefore append the letters FRSAI after his name. He was also an amateur ornithologist regarded as an authority on the birds of the north of Ireland. As a well-known lecturer who communicated his enthusiasm and knowledge of his special hobbies to other people, Henry contributed many articles on such matters to the local papers.

== Career ==
After service as a customs & excise officer in England (1903-4), Henry returned home, where he served mainly around Coleraine. When Lloyd George instituted the Old Age Pensions Act 1908, Henry was appointed to administer it in his area, while still carrying out his duties for the Inland Revenue.

Henry began to assemble his collection of folk songs while he was still a civil servant and continued it after his retirement. When he was appointed Pension Officer, Henry's duties included visiting the poor and elderly people in some of the most isolated areas of Northern Ireland, to determine if they were eligible for old age pensions or relief. To overcome the natural reticence of country people in those remote areas, Henry often took his fiddle and tin whistle with him, played a tune and then asked if anyone in the household knew any of the old songs. He would then record these songs by writing them down using a basic music notation system called tonic sol-fa.

== Songs of the People ==
When he became song editor for the Northern Constitution in 1923, Henry used his column to specify what type of old songs he wanted. In return, the readers contributed songs that he published in a weekly series he called Songs of the People: "Let it be our joyful task to search out, conserve, and make known the treasures of the Songs of the People". In order to motivate the readers, Henry ran weekly song competitions, offering "a weekly prize of a free copy of the Northern Constitution for six months for the best old song submitted."

The first song in the series, "The Flower of Sweet Dunmull" (Henry number H1) was printed on 17 November 1923, and the last one, "The Lass of Mohee" (H836), on 9 December 1939. A long period of illness caused Henry to suspend his editorship after "Ann O'Drumcroon" (H246) was printed on 28 July 1928, and he resumed his duties on 22 October 1932 with the printing of "The Braes of Sweet Kilhoyle" (H464). During his long absence, the Songs of the People series was looked after by other editors (Note: "The Songs of the People series in the Northern Constitution weekly newspaper of Coleraine, County Londonderry was initiated by Sam Henry in 1923 and continued until 1939. From a date in 1928 until a date in 1932 the series, numbers 247-463, was edited, not by Sam Henry but principally by two others, James Moore and William Devine, Moore for about 8 months and Devine for around three years, with occasional interventions by three others.") who published just over 200 articles altogether (numbered 247-463), which therefore do not appear in Henry's scrapbooks. When the series ended on 9 December 1939, Henry had contributed just under 690 songs of high quality, many with multiple variants. (Note: "A Henry number is assigned to each item, corresponding to the number of the original column and preceded by a letter "H". If the column contains two or more items, the Henry number is followed by a lowercase letter of the alphabet, in alphabetical order. A separate letter is assigned to each variant; for example, two texts that share a tune, or two tunes with the same text, are listed as two items. The purpose here is to give a unique differentiating label to each variant combination.") Although the songs were collected in a single district around Coleraine, there is a great amount of diversity, including not only native Irish songs but also songs from Scotland, England and North America.

When publication of the Northern Constitution weekly column ended with the advent of World War II, Henry continued to collect and annotate songs after his retirement and tried to have his collection published in book form. To this end, he assembled two scrapbooks containing most of the material, edited and augmented by his notes of variations, plus other details and corrections of misprints. This material was in the form of cuttings, proof or typescript copies. He also assembled three separate sets of Songs of the People: the Belfast Central Library set, consisting mainly of offprints and cuttings from the Northern Constitution; the National Library of Ireland (Dublin) set, and the Library of Congress (Washington, DC) set, the latter two consisting of three scrapbooks each. All these sets were assembled in varying degrees of completeness. The Belfast set was subsequently copied by the BBC and one of the copies presented to the English Folk Dance and Song Society where it is kept in the Vaughan Williams Memorial Library at Cecil Sharp House. The BBC also commissioned Sean O'Boyle to create an index intended for internal use. Independently of Henry's efforts, another set had been compiled by A. Albert Campbell, a Belfast solicitor and bibliophile who had corresponded with Henry. Campbell bequeathed his set of eight scrapbooks to the Belfast Linen Hall Library and, although also incomplete at the time, this set was later augmented and any gaps filled with photocopies of the BBC set of Henry's own scrapbooks.

== Legacy ==
Despite Henry's attempts to have his collection of folk songs published in book form, this would not happen until 1990, 38 years after his death, when Sam Henry's Songs of the People was published by the University of Georgia Press. This book includes all the songs Henry had published in the Northern Constitution from 17 November 1923 to 28 July 1928 (H1 to H246), and from 28 October 1932 to 9 December 1939 (H464 to H836), with all the songs' tunes transcribed from tonic sol-fa to standard staff notation, plus extensive appendices, indexes and reference aids developed by the book's editors: Gale Huntington, Lani Herrmann and John Moulden.

Henry's collection was the subject of extensive scholarship by Moulden, yielding several publications and a conference address to the Library of Congress on 2 May 2007. The collection inspired recordings by folk singers such as Margaret Barry, Paul Brady, Eddie Butcher, Cara Dillon, Joe Heaney, Joe Holmes & Len Graham, Dolores Keane, Paddy Tunney, and many others. Andy Irvine, who first consulted the Dublin set in the mid-1960s, has interpreted an extensive selection of its songs since the early 1970s as a solo artist and with Planxty, Paul Brady, Patrick Street, and Mozaik.

In addition to his collection of songs, Henry left behind a large aggregate of 11,000 items, comprising photographs and documents, donated to the Coleraine Museum by his grandson, Gordon Craig, on 25 August 2011.

The Portstewart-based musician and researcher Grainne Milner-McLoone recorded and released an album of songs associated with her PhD, The Songs of Sam Henry (2022) under the name Grainne Eve.

A documentary in two episodes on Songs of the People was aired by the BBC, during April 2019.

== Publications ==
=== Books by Sam Henry ===
- A Hank of Yarns (No date)
- Tales of the Antrim seaboard: Dunluce, Giant's Causeway, Fair Head (c.1930)
- Rowlock rhymes and Songs of exile (1933)
- Ulster folk tales: poetry, lore and tradition of the North-East (1939)
- Songs of the people: collected from traditional sources (3 vol. musical score) (1941?)
- The Story of St. Patrick's Church, Coleraine (1941?)
- Dunluce and the Giant’s Causeway (c.1945)

=== Books about Songs of the People ===
- Moulden, John, ed. (1979). Songs of the People: Selections from the Sam Henry collection, Part 1. Belfast: Blackstaff Press. ISBN 978-0-85640-132-9.
- — (1994). Thousands are sailing: a brief song history of Irish emigration. Portrush, Northern Ireland: Ulstersongs. ISBN 978-1-898437-01-7.
- Huntington, Gale; Herrmann, Lani; Moulden, John, eds. (1990). Sam Henry's Songs of the People (hardcover) (1st ed.). Athens, GA and London: The University of Georgia Press. ISBN 978-0-8203-1258-3.
- —; —; —, eds. (2010) [First published 1990]. Sam Henry's Songs of the People (softcover) (Reprinted ed.). Athens, GA and London: The University of Georgia Press. ISBN 978-0-8203-3625-1.

== Selected discography ==
The following table shows a selection of songs recorded from Henry's collection.

Recordings from Sam Henry's Songs of the People
- Title – the title of the song (this column is sortable)
- No. – the song's Henry number (Hxxx) (this column is sortable)
- Singer – the name of the singer on the recording (this column is sortable)
- Album – the title of the album featuring the recorded song (this column is sortable)
- Year – the year the album was released (this column is sortable)
- Notes – a reference about the song and/or its recording (this column is not sortable).

Title	No.	Singer	Album	Year	Notes
"Blackwater Side"	H811	Cara Dillon	Wanderer	2017	
"Bonny Bonny"	H75b	Cara Dillon	Sweet Liberty	2003	
"Bonny Brown Jane"	H613	Joe Holmes and Len Graham	Chaste Muses, Bards And Sages	1976	
"Bonny Woodha'"	H476	Dick Gaughan	The Bonny Pit Laddie	1975	
"Bonny Woodha'"	H476	Andy Irvine	Andy Irvine/Paul Brady	1976	
"Boston Burglar"	H202	Margaret Barry	Ireland's Own	1976	
"Bright Morning Star"	H146	Cara Dillon	A Thousand Hearts	2014	
"Captain Co(u)lston"	H562	Paddy Tunney	The Flowery Vale	1976	
"Captain Co(u)lston"	H562	Andy Irvine	Parallel Lines	1982	
"Carrowclare"	H169	Andy Irvine	All in Good Time	1993	
"Coleraine Regatta"	H36	Paul Brady	The Barley Corn	1969	
"Coleraine Regatta"	H36	Eddie Butcher	I Once Was A Daysman	1975	
"Come With Me Over The Mountain"	H61b	Andy Irvine	Rain on the Roof	1996	
"Dark-Eyed Gipsy"	H124	Joe Holmes and Len Graham	Chaste Muses, Bards And Sages	1976	
"Donald of Glencoe"	H655	Cara Dillon	Cara Dillon	2001	
"Éirigh Suas a Stóirín"	H42a	Cara Dillon	A Thousand Hearts	2014	
"Farewell To Balleymoney"	H615	Andy Irvine	Rainy Sundays... Windy Dreams	1980	
"Farewell To Old Ireland"	H743	Andy Irvine	Rainy Sundays... Windy Dreams	1980	
"Flora"	H637	Eddie Butcher	I Once Was A Daysman	1975	
"Going To Mass Last Sunday"	H625	Margaret Barry	I Sang Through The Fairs	1998	
"Grá Mo Croi"	H204	Joe Holmes and Len Graham	After Dawning	1979	
"Green Grows the Laurel"	H165b	Andy Irvine	Street Life	1997	
"Green Grows the Laurel"	H165b	Cara Dillon	Cara Dillon	2001	
"Green Grows the Rashes"	H165a	Joe Holmes and Len Graham	After Dawning	1979	
"Her Mantle So Green"	H76	Margaret Barry	Street Songs and Fiddle Tunes	1957	
"Her Mantle So Green"	H76	Andy Irvine	Made in Cork	1997	
"I Am A Youth That's Inclined To Ramble"	H788	Paul Brady	Welcome Here Kind Stranger	1978	
"I Am A Youth That's Inclined To Ramble"	H788	Cara Dillon	Cara Dillon	2001	
"Jack Tar"	H779	Andy Irvine	Live at Foxrock Folk Club	1971	
"Jacket So Blue"	H644	Cara Dillon	A Thousand Hearts	2014	
"John Mitchell"	H179ab	Joe Heaney	Irish Songs In Gaelic And English	1965	
"John Mitchell"	H179ab	Paddy Tunney	Ireland Her Own	1966	
"Johnny and Molly"	H755	Joe Holmes and Len Graham	After Dawning	1979	
"Kellswater"	H695	Andy Irvine	The Woman I Loved So Well	1980	
"Loughinsholin"	H176	Joe Holmes and Len Graham	After Dawning	1979	
"Lovely Derry on the Banks of the Foyle"	H813	Margaret Barry	Ireland's Queen Of The Tinkers Sings	1960	
"Lovely Glenshesk"	H28a	Joe Holmes and Len Graham	After Dawning	1979	
"Mary and the Soldier"	H782	Paul Brady	Andy Irvine/Paul Brady	1976	
"Moorlough Mary"	H173	Cara Dillon	A Thousand Hearts	2014	
"Molly Bawn"	H114	Seamus Ennis	World Library: Volume I - Ireland	1955	
"Molly Bawn"	H114	Mick Hanly	The 5th Irish Folk Festival	1978	
"My Love Nell"	H49	Joe Holmes and Len Graham	After Dawning	1979	
"Nights in Carrowclare"	H169	Andy Irvine	Changing Trains	2008	
"Paddy's Green Shamrock Shore"	H192	Paul Brady	Welcome Here Kind Stranger	1978	
"Paddy's Green Shamrock Shore"	H192	Dolores Keane	Farewell To Éirinn	1980	
"Pat Reilly"	H574	Eddie Butcher	Shamrock, Rose and Thistle project	1966	
"Pat Reilly"	H574	Andy Irvine	The Well Below the Valley	1973	
"Roger O'Hehir"	H486	Andy Irvine	The Woman I Loved So Well	1980	
"She's Like the Swallow"	H683	Cara Dillon	Cara Dillon	2001	
"She Moves Through the Fair"	H141	Margaret Barry	Songs of an Irish Tinker Lady	1956	
"Spanking Maggie From The Ross"	H516	Andy Irvine	Made in Cork	1997	
"Streets of Derry"	H705	Andy Irvine	Andy Irvine/Paul Brady	1976	
"Streets of Derry"	H705	Cara Dillon	After the Morning	2005	
"Sweet Bann Water"	H722	Joe Holmes and Len Graham	After Dawning	1979	
"Sweet Bann Water"	H722	Andy Irvine	(Live at Róisín Dubh, Galway)	2001	
"The Banks of the Foyle"	H2	Cara Dillon	Wanderer	2017	
"The Bonny Light Horseman"	H122a	Andy Irvine	High Kings of Tara	1980	
"The Emigrant's Farewell"	H743	Cara Dillon	Sweet Liberty	2003	
"The Factory Girl"	H127	Margaret Barry	Songs of an Irish Tinker Lady	1956	
"The Faughan Side"	H621	Eddie Butcher	Shamrock, Rose and Thistle project	1966	
"The Faughan Side"	H621	Cara Dillon	Wanderer	2017	
"The Flower of Gortade"	H178	Joe Holmes and Len Graham	Chaste Muses, Bards And Sages	1976	
"The Flower of Sweet Strabane"	H224	Margaret Barry	Songs of an Irish Tinker Lady	1956	
"The Galway Shawl"	H652	Margaret Barry	Songs of an Irish Tinker Lady	1956	
"The Galway Shawl"	H652	Ged Foley	On the Fly	2007	
"The Girl I Left Behind"	H118	Andy Irvine	Way Out Yonder	2000	
"The Green Fields of Amerikay"	H743	Len Graham	Wind And Water	1977	
"The Green Fields of Canada"	H743	Paddy Tunney	The Man Of Songs	1962	
"The Green Fields of Canada"	H743	Andy Irvine	Cold Blow and the Rainy Night	1974	
"The Hare's Lament"	H12	Joe Holmes and Len Graham	After Dawning	1979	
"The Hills of Donegal"	H196	Margaret Barry	Songs of an Irish Tinker Lady	1956	
"The Kilgrain Hare"	H12	Andy Irvine	Cornerboys	1996	
"The Lakes Of Pontchartrain"	H619	Paul Brady	Cold Blow and the Rainy Night	1976	
"The Lass of Glenshee"	H590	Cara Dillon	Hill of Thieves	2009	
"The Lion's Den"	H474	Eddie Butcher	I Once Was A Daysman	1975	
"The Lonesome Scenes of Winter"	H637	Cara Dillon	Cara Dillon	2001	
"The Longford Weaver"	H745	Andy Irvine	Rainy Sundays... Windy Dreams	1980	
"The Maid of Culmore"	H687	Cara Dillon	Cara Dillon	2001	
"The Maid of Mourne Shore"	H27a	Joe Holmes and Len Graham	After Dawning	1979	
"The Mountain Road"	H515	Margaret Barry	The Blarney Stone	1961	
"The Mountain Streams"	H32	Eddie Butcher	I Once Was A Daysman	1975	
"The Parting Glass"	H769	Joe Holmes and Len Graham	After Dawning	1979	
"The Rambling Siúler"	H183	Andy Irvine	After the Break	1979	
"The Rocks of Bawn"	H139	Seamus Ennis	World Library: Volume I - Ireland	1955	
"The Rocks of Bawn"	H139	Joe Heaney	Irish Music in London Pubs	1965	
"The Rocks of Bawn"	H139	Paul Brady	The Given Note	1995	
"The Thatchers of Gleanrea"	H186	Dick Gaughan	No More Forever	1972	
"The Verdant Braes of Skreen"	H593	Cara Dillon	Hill of Thieves	2009	
"The Wild Colonial Boy"	H750	Margaret Barry	Street Songs and Fiddle Tunes	1957	
"The Yellow Bittern"	H830	Joe Heaney	Come All Ye Gallant Irishmen	1975	
"The Yellow Bittern"	H830	Paddy Tunney	The Stone Fiddle	1982	
"Thousands Are Sailing"	N/A	Eddie Butcher	I Once Was A Daysman	1975	
"Thousands Are Sailing"	N/A	Andy Irvine	Words & Music	1983	
"Three Huntsmen"	H185	Johnny Moynihan	Sweeney's Men	1968	
"Three Huntsmen"	H185	Andy Irvine	Abocurragh	2010	
"True Lover John"	H722	Joe Holmes and Len Graham	Chaste Muses, Bards And Sages	1976	
"Tumbling through the Hay"	H697	Joe Holmes and Len Graham	Chaste Muses, Bards And Sages	1976	
"When I Was a Bachelor"	H694	Joe Holmes and Len Graham	Chaste Muses, Bards And Sages	1976	
