= Rude Awakening (Andy Irvine album) =

Studio album by Andy Irvine
- Released: 1991
- Recorded: December 1990 & January 1991
- Studio: Westland and Ringsend Studios, Dublin and Frank MacNamara's Park Studio, County Meath
- Genre: Irish folk music
- Length: 51:09
- Label: Green Linnet Records, (USA)
- Producer: Bill Whelan

Andy Irvine chronology
Parallel Lines (1982)	Rude Awakening (1991)	East Wind (1992)

Rude Awakening is Andy Irvine's second solo album, recorded in December 1990 and January 1991 at Westland and Ringsend Studios, Dublin and Frank MacNamara's Park Studio, County Meath, and released in 1991 on Green Linnet Records.

It was produced by Bill Whelan with a line-up that included Whelan himself (keyboards, percussion), Rens van der Zalm (fiddle, mandolin, guitar), Carl Geraghty (soprano saxophone), Arty McGlynn (guitars), Davy Spillane (whistle) and Fionnuala Sherry (fiddle).

== Recording ==
This album features Irvine's tribute song to Woody Guthrie ("Never Tire of the Road"), alongside mainly self-penned material celebrating some of his many other heroes:

- WW2 Swedish diplomat "Raoul Wallenberg",
- Union organiser "James Connolly"—a traditional song for which Irvine wrote new music,
- Mexican revolutionary leader Emiliano Zapata ("Viva Zapata!"),
- Michael Dwyer ("Michael Dwyer's Escape"),
- Antarctic explorers "Douglas Mawson" and Aeneas Mackintosh ("Rude Awakening"), and
- American novelist Sinclair Lewis ("The Whole Damn Thing").

The only other traditional song is "Allan McLean", for which Irvine wrote new music also.

The sleeve notes of "Love To Be With You"—a poignant song of longing—show a faded, black & white photo of Vida, the heroine of "Rainy Sundays", the song Irvine released ten years earlier on Rainy Sundays... Windy Dreams.

== Track listing ==
All tracks composed by Andy Irvine; except where indicated

1. "Never Tire of the Road" – 3:58
2. "Raoul Wallenberg" – 5:15
3. "James Connolly" (Traditional; with new music by Andy Irvine) – 6:38
4. "Viva Zapata!" – 4:25
5. "The Whole Damn Thing" – 5:40
6. "Rude Awakening" – 4:15
7. "Michael Dwyer's Escape" – 4:59
8. "Douglas Mawson" – 6:38
9. "Allan McLean" (Traditional; with new music by Andy Irvine) – 4.59
10. "Love To Be With You" – 4:22

== Personnel ==
- Andy Irvine - vocals, bouzouki, harmonica
- Bill Whelan - keyboards, percussion, backing vocals
- Arty McGlynn - guitar
- Rens van der Zalm - fiddle, mandolin, guitar
- Carl Geraghty - soprano saxophone
- Fionnuala Sherry - fiddle
- Davy Spillane - whistle
