= Parallel Lines (Dick Gaughan & Andy Irvine album) =

Studio album by Dick Gaughan & Andy Irvine
- Released: 1982
- Recorded: August 1981
- Studio: Tonstudio in St Blasien/Herrenhaus, Northeim, Germany
- Genre: Irish and Scottish folk music
- Length: 42:33
- Label: FolkFreak-Platten, Ebergotzen
- Producer: Dick Gaughan, Andy Irvine, Carsten Linde

Dick Gaughan chronology
| Handful of Earth (1981) | Parallel Lines (1982) |

Andy Irvine chronology
| Rainy Sundays... Windy Dreams (1980) | Parallel Lines (1982) | Rude Awakening (1991) |

Parallel Lines is a one-off album by Dick Gaughan and Andy Irvine, recorded in August 1981 at Günter Pauler's Tonstudio in St Blasien/Herrenhaus, Northeim, Germany, and released in 1982 on the German FolkFreak-Platten label.

It was produced by Gaughan, Irvine and Carsten Linden with a line-up including Gaughan (acoustic and electric guitars, bass guitar and vocal), Irvine (bouzouki, mandola, mandolin, harmonica, hurdy-gurdy, vocal), Nollaig Casey (fiddle), Martin Buschmann (saxophone), Judith Jaenicke (flute) and Bob Lenox (Fender Rhodes piano). Dónal Lunny also overdubbed the fiddle parts and remixed the album at Lombard Sound Studios in Dublin.

== Background ==
In his online autobiography, Irvine recalls:

After one of these tours [in 1980], I went into a recording studio in Northeim, Germany to record an album called Folk Friends 2—others had already made number one. Assembled were my old friends Jack Elliott and Derroll Adams, Alex Campbell, Dick Gaughan, Dolores Keane and John Faulkner and many others. That was some week! (...) We recorded in different combinations and I recorded "Thousands are Sailing" with Dick which would lead to our making an album together a year later: Parallel Lines.

About the recording of Parallel Lines, Irvine added in a later interview:

We had had a couple of rehearsals in Dick's place in Leith and my place in Dublin but mainly of my songs as Dick didn’t really decide what he would sing till we got to Germany. He did a fantastic job on my material. The more so because this was my ‘really really complicated’ period! Whenever we meet, we always make plans to do another one! Don't know if it will ever happen...

== Recording of the original album ==
"The Creggan White Hare" is a fairly modern ballad that Irvine learned from the singing of Vincent Donnelly from Castle Caulfield, County Tyrone, on an old BBC disc recorded in 1952 by Sean O'Boyle and Peter Kennedy. It relates the hunting of hares with greyhounds, a popular pastime in many rural areas in Ireland. However, "the white hare of Low Creggan was too smart for them all".

"The Lads O' The Fair" / "Leith Docks". The first part, sung here by Gaughan, is a modern ballad written by Brian McNeill "(...) to commemorate a piece of his home town’s social history, the Falkirk Tryst, the great meeting at which the cattle of the Highlands, herded from the north by the drove roads, would be sold to southern buyers. (...) The song takes three characters; a weaver who wants to sell his cloth, a drover who’s looking forward to a good drink at the end of his work, and a ploughman who wants a new job, and it lets each of them tell of their expectations of the Tryst". "Leith Docks" is a short instrumental coda composed by Gaughan and lasting approximately 20 seconds.

"At Twenty-One" is the heartbreaking story of a poor young man who watches his sweetheart sail away after she gave her hand in marriage to a rich young man. Irvine learned it from the singing of Robert Cinnamond who lived on the banks of Lough Neagh, County Tyrone and who had many songs collected for the BBC by Sean Boyle in 1955.

"My Back Pages" / "Afterthoughts". The first piece is Gaughan's interpretation of Bob Dylan's song.

"The Dodger's Song" was first recorded by the Almanac Singers in 1942, which included Woody Guthrie. Irvine and Gaughan "added a few extra verses for good measure".

"Captain Thunderbolt" is usually called "The Shannonside", but Irvine learned it from Tom Moran of Mohill, County Leitrim, who had changed it to "Lough Allen Side" to make it more localized. Captain Thunderbolt was a pseudonym often used by the United Irishmen around the time of the 1798 rising.

"Captain Colston" is the story of a ship of poverty-stricken Irish emigrants being attacked by pirates on their voyage to the new world. However, Captain Colston's wife comes on deck "And with a pistol ball/She took the pirate captain's life". Irvine heard this song from Brigid Tunney and filled out the story from a longer version he learned from an old recording of Peter O'Donnell, also from Castle Caulfield, County Tyrone.

"Floo'ers O' The Forest" is Gaughan's interpretation of "Flowers of the Forest", an ancient Scottish folk tune commemorating the Scottish defeat at the Battle of Flodden in 1513.

== Two versions of the CD ==
The original, 1982 vinyl LP was re-released twice on CD:

- in 1990, on the German label Wundertüte Musik, as a direct transfer on CD of the original 8 tracks described above;
- in 1997, on the US label Appleseed Recordings, with the original 8 tracks—plus a bonus track of the 1980 recording of "Thousands Are Sailing To Amerikay", described below.

=== Bonus track: "Thousand Are Sailing To Amerikay" ===
While most emigration ballads are in the first person and concern themselves with the general misfortune of leaving Ireland, this song is related by an observer and describes the emigrants' last night at home, the packing of trunks, the tearful farewell to friends, relations and neighbours, his journey to the train and the final heartbreak of pulling away from the shore. Irvine first heard a version of this song on a recording by Cathal McConnell and Robin Morton and afterwards, another version by Eddie Butcher from Magilligan, County Londonderry. This version of the song was first recorded by Irvine and Gaughan during the Folk Friends 2 sessions in 1980.

Irvine would re-record "Thousands Are Sailing to Amerikay" with Planxty in December 1982, for release—under the shorter title of "Thousands Are Sailing"—on their album Words & Music.

== Track listing ==
1. "The Creggan White Hare" (Text: Traditional, with new words by Andy Irvine; Music: Andy Irvine, arranged by Andy Irvine and Dick Gaughan) – 4:45
2. "The Lads O' The Fair" (Brian McNeill) / "Leith Docks" (Dick Gaughan) – 3:45
3. "At Twenty-One" (Text: Traditional, with new words by Andy Irvine; Music: Andy Irvine) – 3:57
4. "My Back Pages" (Bob Dylan) / "Afterthoughts" (Dick Gaughan) – 5:25
5. "The Dodger's Song" (Text: Traditional, with new words by Dick Gaughan; Music: Traditional, arranged by Dick Gaughan and Andy Irvine) – 2:58
6. "Captain Thunderbolt" (Text: Traditional, with new words by Andy Irvine; Music: Andy Irvine, arranged by Andy Irvine and Dick Gaughan) – 4:06
7. "Captain Colston" (Text: Traditional, with new words by Andy Irvine; Music: Andy Irvine, arranged by Andy Irvine) – 5:34
8. "Floo'ers O' The Forest" (Text: Traditional; Music: Traditional, arranged by Dick Gaughan) – 7:36
9. "Thousands Are Sailing to Amerikay" (Text: Traditional, with new words by Andy Irvine; Music: Andy Irvine, arranged by Andy Irvine) – 4:27 (*)

(*) Bonus track; only on the 1997 CD re-issue of Parallel Lines from US label Appleseed Recordings.

== Personnel ==
=== Musicians ===
- Andy Irvine – vocal, bouzouki, mandola, mandolin, harmonica, hurdy-gurdy
- Dick Gaughan – vocal, guitars, bass
- Nollaig Casey – fiddle
- Martin Buschmann – saxophone
- Judith Jaenicke – flute
- Bob Lenox – Fender Rhodes piano

=== Production ===
- Günter Pauler – sound engineer (Northeim, Germany)
- Dónal Lunny – overdub of fiddle and remix at Lombard Studios (Dublin, Ireland)
