= Northern Constitution =

Northern Irish newspaper

- Type: Weekly newspaper
- Owner(s): Alpha Media Group Ltd.
- Founded: 1875
- Headquarters: 23 Main Street, Limavady; BT49 0EP; United Kingdom
- Website: northernconstitution.co.uk

The Northern Constitution is a weekly newspaper in Coleraine, Northern Ireland. It was founded in 1875 under the title Coleraine Constitution and Northern Counties Advertiser, and was renamed to its current title in 1908.

It is notable for featuring a weekly column entitled Songs of the People, from 17 November 1923 until 9 December 1939, which had been sponsored by the paper's assistant editor at the time, Bob Bacon, who became its editor from 1927 until 1952. Bacon had seen the value of publishing a regular series on folk songs after witnessing the enthusiastic efforts of Sam Henry, who became the newspaper's Song Editor from the column's inception until 28 July 1928 and again—after a long illness—from 22 October 1932 until the end of the series, on 9 December 1939. During his tenure, Henry published just under 690 songs of high quality.
