= Skewball =

British-bred Thoroughbred racehorse

Skewball was the name of an 18th-century British racehorse, most famous as the subject of a broadsheet ballad and folk-song.

== History ==
The horse was foaled in 1741 and originally owned by Francis Godolphin, 2nd Earl of Godolphin, and later sold. His name has been recorded as "Squball", "Sku-ball", or "Stewball". He won many races in England and was sent to Ireland. The Irish turf calendar states that he won six races worth £508 in 1752, when he was eleven years old, and was the top-earning runner of that year in Ireland. His most famous race took place on the plains of County Kildare, Ireland, which is generally the subject of the song of the same name. The early ballad about the event has Skewball belonging to an Arthur Marvell or Mervin. Based on the horse's name, Skewball was likely a skewbald horse though he was listed in stud books as a bay.

== Songs ==
There are two major different versions of the sporting ballad, generally titled either "Skewball" or "Stewball"; the latter is more popular in America. There are multiple variations within the two major divisions. Versions date at least as far back as the 18th century, appearing on numerous broadsides. In both songs the title horse is the underdog in the race, up against a favored grey mare (usually called either "Griselda" or "Molly"), and although in most versions of Stewball the winning horse triumphs due to the stumbling of the lead horse, Skewball wins simply by being the faster horse in the end. Probably the most significant lyrical difference in the songs is the conversation Skewball has with his jockey, while Stewball behaves more like a typical horse and does not speak.

The oldest broadside identified with the ballad is dated 1784 and is held by the Harding Collection of the Bodleian Library of the University of Oxford. The song had spread to America by 1829 when it was published in a songbook in Hartford. American versions were sung and adapted by slaves in the Southern United States, and have Stewball racing in California, Texas, and Kentucky. British and Irish versions, when the setting is mentioned, usually place the race in County Kildare, Ireland, leading some to believe that the song is actually Irish in origin. The grey mare was owned by Sir Ralph Gore, whose family had gained a great deal of land in Ireland with the Protestant Cromwellian invasion (starting in 1650), which probably accounts for the delight in Skewball's win "breaking Sir Gore" in the final lines of this Irish-based broadside.

The song is in the Roud Folk Song Index, #456.

== Recordings ==
An early mention of the horse is found in an early 20th century folk song, "When I Go Out" by Buster Red, who references seeing no horse like "Stewball" at the Saratoga Race Course. A notable recording is by American folk legend Woody Guthrie, who recorded an English and an American interpretation (both entitled Stewball) on disc, in 1944 and 1946 respectively, released in Volume 4 of The Asch Recordings (1940–1949). The American interpretation is a chain-gang song sung by Lead Belly and Guthrie with an African American 'call and response' style, while the English interpretation is derived from the traditional British broadside ballad, and sung to a cowboy waltz tune. The American interpretation has Stewball as being born in California with the famed race against the grey mare taking place in Dallas, Texas. Lead Belly recorded several versions of this song, and the music and lyrics from his version appear in American Ballads and Folk Songs by John and Alan Lomax. John and Ruby Lomax also recorded a version by a "Group of Convicts" in their 1939 Southern States Recording Trip, available online at the American Memory site.

Lead Belly's American chain-gang version of "Stewball" was covered in the 1950s by The Weavers, and then by British skiffle singer Lonnie Donegan. Guthrie's cowboy version of the British ballad, with the same lyrics but a different tune, was recorded in 1961 on the Vanguard album New Folks by John Herald and the Greenbriar Boys, and subsequently covered and popularized by Peter, Paul and Mary. Their version, however, has lyrics from a different perspective, where the singer wishes he had bet on Stewball, as opposed to Johnny Herald, who encourages others to do so, because he "never did lose." Cash Box described the Peter, Paul and Mary version as "a hard-driving, rhythmic ditty about a race-horse who has a preference for wine." Other versions of this version of "Stewball" include Mason Proffit on Wanted (1969), which differs in a number of lyrical changes (including the grey mare stumbling) from Peter, Paul, and Mary's version, Joan Baez's on Joan Baez/5 (1964), The Hollies on Would You Believe (1966), The Four Pennies on their Mixed Bag LP (1966), and the Chad Mitchell Trio on Reflecting (1964).

Popular British versions include recordings by A. L. Lloyd, Martin Carthy, and Steeleye Span on the album Ten Man Mop, or Mr. Reservoir Butler Rides Again. The song has also been recorded by Irish musicians Andy Irvine and Paul Brady as "The Plains of Kildare" on their duo album Andy Irvine/Paul Brady, in 1976.

A French song called "Stewball" (or also known as "Il s'appelait Stewball") was recorded by Hugues Aufray in 1966, becoming one of Aufray's biggest hits. However, this song (written by Hugues Aufray and Pierre Delanoë) is unlike the English-language songs of the same name, although the adaptation was created after Aufray met Peter, Paul, and Mary, along with others such as Bob Dylan in a trip to the United States. Aufray's version takes the perspective of a man recalling an experience as a ten-year-old boy. His father believes that Stewball will win a race, so he puts all his money and assets into this venture. Toward the end of the race, Stewball tragically falls. The veterinarian finishes him off with a single shot. This is the first time that the narrator witnesses his father cry. Aufray's song is very different in that it features Stewball not winning his race and dying due to an injury. This version was also later translated into the Czech language by Milan Dvořák, becoming widely known as a campfire song.

Also of interest are the renditions of the song by Doris Day that she had recorded in 1985/1986 for her TV series Doris Day's Best Friends: a solo version released on the American edition of her CD-album My Heart (2011) as well as a duet version with her late son Terry Melcher released in 2014 on the CD-album Music, Movies & Memories.

The melody was also the basis for the song "Happy Xmas (War is Over)" by John Lennon, Yoko Ono and the Plastic Ono Band, which has become a Christmas standard since its release in 1971.

== See also ==
- List of racehorses
