= Rainy Sundays... Windy Dreams =

Studio album by Andy Irvine
- Released: January 1980
- Recorded: Late 1979
- Studio: Windmill Lane Studios, Dublin
- Genre: Irish / Southeastern European / Balkan folk music
- Length: 46:38
- Label: Tara Records
- Producer: Dónal Lunny

Andy Irvine chronology
Andy Irvine/Paul Brady (1976)	Rainy Sundays... Windy Dreams (1980)	Parallel Lines (1982)

Rainy Sundays... Windy Dreams is Andy Irvine's first solo album, produced by Dónal Lunny and recorded at Dublin's Windmill Lane Studios in late 1979. It was released in January 1980 by Tara Records.

Andy Irvine's first solo album showcased songs and tunes from two of his main influences: side one (on the vinyl LP) featured pieces inspired by Irish traditional music, and side two concentrated on Balkan music.

== Recording ==
The album opens with a trilogy of songs ("The Emigrants"), comprising: "The Green Fields Of Amerikay" (which Irvine learnt from Len Graham), "Farewell To Old Ireland" (Irvine's adaptation of "The Emigrant's Farewell", H743 from Sam Henry's collection) and "Edward Connors" (which Irvine learnt from Eddie Butcher of Magilligan, County Londonderry).

Then comes "The Longford Weaver" (H745 in Sam Henry's, where it is also known as "Long Cookstown" or "Nancy Whiskey"); it segues into "Christmas Eve" (reel).

The Irish set concludes with "Farewell To Balleymoney" (H615 in Sam Henry's collection).

The Balkan set begins with "Romanian Song (Blood and Gold)", based on a Romanian song collected by Béla Bartók, re-written by Irvine and Jane Cassidy and set to the music of a Bulgarian dance tune in the 'paidushka' rhythm of 5/16; the song then segues into "Paidushko Horo", an extensive collection of musical phrases borrowed from Bulgarian dance tunes in the same rhythm and performed at breakneck speed.

"King Bore And The Sandman", in mixed rhythms of 6/8, 9/8 and 4/4, is Irvine's energetic lament about his times in Bucharest and "dedicated to the man, in the public house, we are always trying to avoid".

The original album (LP) closes with the self-penned "Rainy Sundays", reminiscing about a young lady called Vida with whom Irvine pursued "a one-sided romance in Ljubljana years ago."

The CD version of Rainy Sundays... Windy Dreams, released in 1989, includes a bonus track of "Bonny Woodhall" featuring Irvine with Mick Hanly during their live performance as a duo at 'The 4th Irish Folk Festival' in Germany on April 30, 1977. "Bonny Woodhall" is Irvine's interpretation of "Bonny Woodha' " (H476 in Sam Henry's Songs of the People), which he also set to new music. On this track, Irvine accompanied himself on Fylde 'Octavius' bouzouki (with the bottom two courses strung in octave).

== Track listing ==
1. The Emigrants – 13.51

(a) "Come to the land of sweet liberty" (Traditional; arranged by Irvine, Lunny, Gavin and O'Flynn)
(b) "Farewell to old Ireland" (Traditional; arranged by Irvine, Lunny, Brady and Gavin)
(c) "Edward Connors" (Traditional; arranged by Irvine and Lunny)

2. "Longford Weaver"/"Christmas Eve" (Traditional; arranged by Irvine, Gavin and Epping) / (Traditional; arranged by Irvine, Gavin, Epping and Lunny) – 5:31
3. "Farewell to Ballymoney" (Traditional; arranged by Irvine, Lunny and Brady) – 4:31
4. "Romanian Song (Blood and Gold)" (Andy Irvine, Jane Cassidy) – 4:09
5. "Paidushko Horo" (Traditional; arranged by Irvine and Lunny) – 3:34
6. "King Bore and the Sandman" (Andy Irvine) – 3:05
7. "Rainy Sundays" (Andy Irvine) – 6:13
8. "Bonny Woodhall" (Bonus Track) (Traditional; arranged by Andy Irvine) – 5:44 (*)

== Personnel ==
- Andy Irvine - vocals, bouzouki, mandolin, mandola, hurdy-gurdy, harmonica
- Dónal Lunny - guitar, bouzouki, 10-string bouzouki, harmonium, Pan flute, percussion, backing vocals
- Liam O'Flynn - Uilleann pipes
- Paul Brady - guitar, piano
- Frankie Gavin - fiddle, viola, flute
- Rick Epping - accordion, harmonica, jaw harp
- John Wadham - bongo and congas
- Paul Barrett - Fender Rhodes and Polymoog
- Garvan Gallagher - bass guitar
- Keith Donald - soprano saxophone
- Lucienne Purcell - vocals
- Mick Hanly - guitar (Bonus track) (*)

Recorded and mixed at Windmill Lane Studios in Dublin.
Produced by Dónal Lunny.
Engineered by Brian Masterson.
(*) Bonus track recorded live at 'The 4th Irish Folk Festival' in Germany on April 30, 1977.
