= EastWind =

Studio album by Andy Irvine & Davy Spillane
- Released: Mid-1992
- Recorded: 1990 – February 1991
- Studio: Westland Studios, Dublin
- Genre: Irish and Southeastern European folk music; world fusion
- Length: 40:55
- Label: Tara Music
- Producer: Andy Irvine (executive producer), Bill Whelan (producer)

Andy Irvine chronology
Rude Awakening (1991)	EastWind (1992)	Rain on the Roof (1996)

Davy Spillane chronology
Pipedreams (1991)	East Wind (1992)	A Place Among the Stones (1994)

EastWind is an album by Andy Irvine and Davy Spillane, showcasing a fusion of Irish folk music with traditional Bulgarian and Macedonian music. Produced by Irvine and Bill Whelan, who also contributed keyboards and piano, it was widely regarded as revolutionary at recording.

The extensive line-up included Nikola Parov on Bulgarian instruments (gadulka, kaval, gaida) & Greek bouzouki, Máirtín O'Connor (accordion), Noel Eccles & Paul Moran (percussion), Tony Molloy (bass), Carl Geraghty & Kenneth Edge (saxophones), John Sheahan (fiddle), Anthony Drennan (guitar), Mícheál Ó Súilleabháin (piano), Márta Sebestyén (vocals) and Rita Connolly (backing vocals).

In an interview with Folk Roots in August 1992, Irvine stated: "We finished it eighteen months ago but (...) John Cook at Tara wanted to try the avenue of big companies." The album was eventually released on the Tara label itself in mid-1992.

Subsequently, Irvine and Parov were joined by Rens van der Zalm and toured together in Europe as the 'East Wind Trio', and then again in the US during 1996, prior to forming the band Mozaik in 2002, which covers several of this album's tracks.

== Overview ==
Andy Irvine noted that the album was originally conceived as a Bulgarian/jazz fusion album, and only changed direction "somewhere along the line" during production.

The album opens with "Chetvorno Horo", a Bulgarian dance tune in 7/16 time (3–2–2) played by the whole band, with chord progressions underpinning melodic phrases played in unison by Irvine (bouzouki) and O'Connor (accordion).

Then comes "Mechkin Kamen" ("The Bear's Rock"), a slow Macedonian song sung by Sebestyén, with backing vocals by Connolly.

"Dance of Suleiman" is a fast Macedonian dance tune in the 'kopanitsa' rhythm of 11/16 (2–2–3–2–2) and based on "Sulejmanovo Oro", a 1978 recording by Dutch ethnomusicologist Wouter Swets and his folk group Čalgija.

"Illyrian Dawn" is a Bulgarian slow air, with Spillane on low whistle first, then on uilleann pipes, accompanied by Whelan on keyboards.

"Pride of Macedonia" is a collection of melodies in 11/8 time.

"Antice" is another Macedonian tune, in 7/8 time, recorded by Swets and Čalgija in 1978.

"Two Steps to the Bar" is the witty title of the next track, a fast dance tune in the 'paidushka' rhythm of 5/16 (2–3).

Sebestyén sings again on the next piece, "Kadana", a slow song that girls in the Rhodope Mountains of Bulgaria would sing about the problems and prohibitions of love affairs in their communities.

The album closes with "Hard on the Heels", a re-working of "Smeceno Horo" (meaning "broken dance") which Irvine first recorded with Planxty on After The Break. It is introduced slowly by Ó Súilleabháinin (piano), then various combinations of instruments from the whole band proceed with playing the entire piece, which begins in 15/16 time (8/16 + 7/16) and 11/16, then continues in two different 9/16 rhythms.

== Reception and influence ==
Professional ratings
Review scores
Source	Rating
AllMusic	4/5 stars
Hi-Fi News and Record Review	(favourable)

The album was released to critical acclaim. Richard Foss of AllMusic retrospectively wrote that "though many Celtic musicians have been interested by the exotic rhythms of Bulgarian and Macedonian music, this CD is one of the only instances in which the fusion sounds both natural and exciting," and he "highly recommended" the album. Ken Hyder's favourable review in the September 1992 issue of Hi-Fi News and Record Review said that "Davy Spillane's fans will love it; as will all those who fondly remember Andy Irvine's work with Planxty. A musical adventure which succeeds brilliantly."

This project would have a profound influence on the future genesis of the highly successful Riverdance:

It is significant, also, that Bill Whelan had been working as a producer of [an] album about two years before Riverdance. It was called East Wind and that entire album was comprised of East European music. Its making can be ascribed to combining the talents of Davy Spillane and Andy Irvine, and its geographic origins can be ascribed to Irvine who introduced the East European tempo and style onto the Irish traditional scene.

—Barra O'Cinnéide, Riverdance: The Phenomenon.

== Track listing ==
1. "Chetvorno Horo" – 3:48
2. "The Bear's Rock" – 3:31
3. "Dance of Suleiman" – 5:30
4. "Illyrian Dawn" – 3:25
5. "Pride of Macedonia" – 3:17
6. "Antice" – 5:42
7. "Two Steps to the Bar" – 4:07
8. "Kadana" – 5:42
9. "Hard on the Heels" – 5:53

== Personnel ==
- Andy Irvine – bouzouki, hurdy-gurdy
- Davy Spillane – uilleann pipes, low whistle
- Nikola Parov – gadulka, kaval, gaida, bouzouki
- Bill Whelan – keyboards, piano
- Anthony Drennan – guitar
- Tony Molloy – bass
- Paul Moran – percussion
- Noel Eccles – percussion
- Máirtín O'Connor – accordion
- Carl Garaghty – saxophone
- Mícheál Ó Súilleabháin – piano
- Márta Sebestyén – vocals
- Rita Connolly – backing vocals
- Produced by Bill Whelan
- Executive producer – Andy Irvine
- Recorded at Westland Studios, Dublin
- Engineered by Philip Begley
