= Creggan, County Tyrone =

Townland in County Tyrone, Northern Ireland

Creggan An Creagán
- Townland
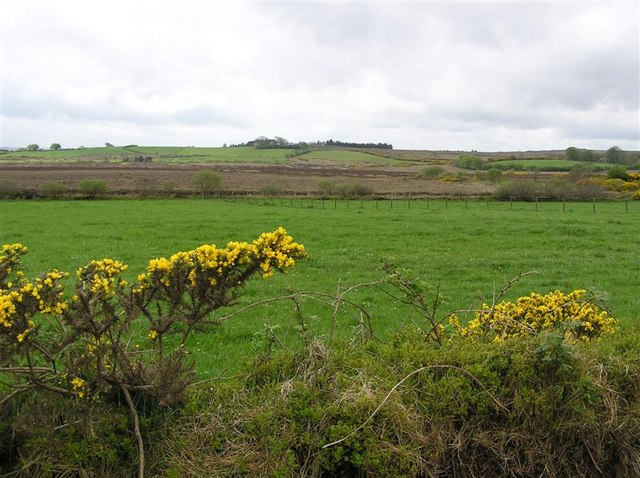
- Creggan townland in 2006

- Location within Northern Ireland
- Coordinates: 54.649°N 7.038°W
- Sovereign state: United Kingdom
- Country: Northern Ireland
- County: County Tyrone

Creggan (Irish: An Creagán) is a townland in County Tyrone, Northern Ireland. It is situated in the historic barony of Omagh East and the civil parish of Termonmaguirk and covers an area of 4022 acres.

Popular places of tourist interest include the An Creagán centre, located three miles north of Carrickmore on the main Cookstown to Omagh road. Tourists are drawn to the old-fashioned cottages located near the An Creagán centre.

The popular traditional folk song, The "Creggan White Hare", is named for this townland.

The population of the townland declined during the late 19th century:

Year	1841	1851	1861	1871	1881	1891
Population	371	423	427	440	392	333
Houses	69	68	77	79	71	70

== See also ==
- List of townlands of County Tyrone
