= Andy Irvine/Paul Brady =

Studio album by Andy Irvine/Paul Brady
- Released: December 1976
- Recorded: 24 August–3 September 1976
- Studio: Rockfield Studios, Wales
- Genre: Irish folk
- Length: 46:24
- Label: Mulligan Music Ltd (Dublin, Ireland)
- Producer: Dónal Lunny

Andy Irvine chronology
Andy Irvine/Paul Brady (1976)	Rainy Sundays... Windy Dreams (1980)

Paul Brady chronology
Andy Irvine/Paul Brady (1976)	Welcome Here Kind Stranger (1978)

Andy Irvine/Paul Brady is an album recorded by Andy Irvine and Paul Brady when they formed a duo, after Planxty broke up on 5 December 1975. For this recording, they were joined by Dónal Lunny and Kevin Burke.

It was produced by Lunny and recorded at Rockfield Studios in the autumn of 1976, and released in December 1976 by Mulligan Music Ltd.

== Recording ==
Irvine opens the album with his arrangement of "Plains of Kildare": an instrumental intro in 6/8 time (jig) leads into the song, which is in 3/4 time for the first six verses until an elegant transition switches to an instrumental middle eight played in the Bulgarian rachenitsa rhythm of 7/8 time (2–2–3) which aptly suggests the gallop of racing horses, then back in 3/4, as the horses slow down for the final verse prior to the finale, again in 6/8. Irvine adapted the lyrics based on earlier versions from Eddie Butcher and A.L. Lloyd, while also using additional sources supplied by Frank Harte.

"Lough Erne Shore" is an Ulster love song that Brady learnt from Paddy Tunney, son of Brigid Tunney. On this recording, Irvine provides an ingenious accompaniment on hurdy-gurdy that implies the instrument's drones are capable of playing chords. Years later, Irvine explained: "I recorded three different drones on the hurdy-gurdy and we cross faded them on the mix to fit the chords. It's very subtle and you may not hear it but I thought it gave it a great feeling."

"Fred Finn's Reel/Sailing into Walpole's Marsh" are two reels learnt from Deirdre Shannon (fiddle), Brian Bailey (flute) and Trevor Stewart (uilleann pipes), a trio from Northern Ireland.

"Bonny Woodhall" is Irvine's interpretation of "Bonny Woodha'" (H476 in Sam Henry's Songs of the People), which he also set to new music.

"Arthur McBride and the Sergeant" is Brady's version of the anti-recruiting song collected by P.W. Joyce c. 1840.

"The Jolly Soldier", sung by Brady, is a modern variant of the old ballad of "Earl Brand", where a father and seven brothers are slain by the lover they are pursuing. In this version, the old man relents and gives the lover both his daughter and all of his money. It is followed by "The Blarney Pilgrim", a three-part jig out of the Cork/Kerry tradition, learnt from Paul Davis.

"Autumn Gold" is a self-penned ballad by Irvine and the final song of a quartet written during his sojourn in Eastern Europe during 1968–69, after spending several months in Ljubljana.

"Mary and the Soldier", sung by Brady, is the story of the soldier heading for the wars and leaving the girl behind. In this version of the song, also collected by Sam Henry under the title of "The Gallant Soldier" (H782 in Songs of the People), he is so impressed by her loyalty that he marries her before he goes away.

"Streets of Derry", sung by Irvine, is yet another song from Sam Henry's collection (H705, "The Dreary Gallows"). It tells the story of a young gentleman who fell in love with a rich lady but her parents did not consent to their marriage and had him condemned to be hanged. But she defied her parents, obtained a pardon from the Queen and married him in the end.

"Martinmas Time" is the story of "a troop of soldiers" extracting a solemn promise from a maid that she will come to their quarters and she, being true to her word, does so. But by cutting her hair and dressing as a man, she succeeds in cheating them while keeping her part of the bargain: she leaves a sign to show that she has been there and gallops home a maiden. It is sung by Irvine.

The album closes with "The Little Stack of Wheat", a hornpipe Brady learnt from its recording by Michael Coleman under the title "The Stack of Barley".

== Track listing ==
1. "Plains of Kildare" (Words: Traditional; Music: Irvine) – 4.16
2. "Lough Erne Shore" (Traditional; arranged by Brady) – 3:43
3. "Fred Finn's Reel"/"Sailing into Walpole's Marsh" (Traditional; arranged by Brady, Irvine, Lunny and Burke) – 2:34
4. "Bonny Woodhall" (Words: Traditional; Music: Irvine) – 5:14
5. "Arthur McBride" (Brady, adapted & arranged with new lyrics from traditional) – 7.05
6. "The Jolly Soldier" (Traditional; arranged with additional lyrics by Brady) / "The Blarney Pilgrim" (Traditional; arranged by Brady, Irvine and Burke) – 5:37
7. "Autumn Gold" (Andy Irvine) – 3:48
8. "Mary and the Soldier" (Traditional; arranged with additional lyrics by Brady) – 4:45
9. "The Streets of Derry" (Traditional; arranged by Irvine) – 3.51
10. "Martinmas Time" (Traditional; arranged by Irvine) / "The Little Stack of Wheat" (Traditional; arranged by Brady, Lunny and Burke) – 6:01

== Personnel ==
- Andy Irvine - vocals, bouzouki, mandolin, mandola, hurdy-gurdy, harmonica. (All tracks, except 5 and 10b).
- Paul Brady - vocals, guitar, mandolin, bouzouki, tin whistle, cittern, harmonium, backing vocals. (All tracks, except 7).
- Dónal Lunny - guitar, bouzouki, bodhrán, backing vocals. (All tracks, except 2, 5 and 9).
- Kevin Burke - fiddle on tracks 1, 3, 6, 8 and 10.

== Anniversary tour ==
The 40th anniversary of the album's release was celebrated by a tour of Ireland during May 2017, featuring the original personnel: Irvine, Brady, Lunny and Burke. The tour visited Cork, Dublin, Derry, Limerick, Galway and Belfast.
