= Fylde Guitars =

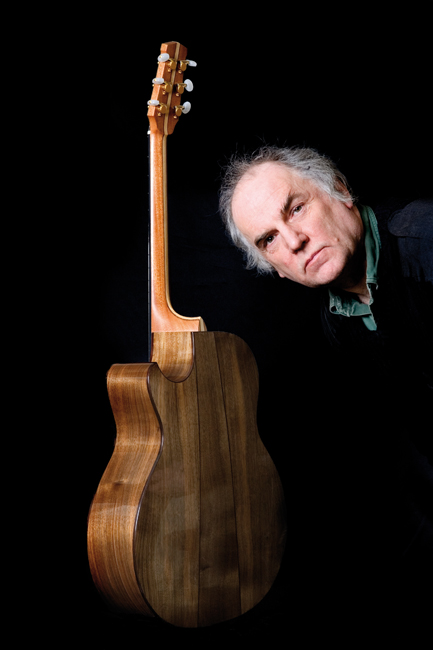
Roger Bucknall of Fylde Guitars with a Magician Guitar

Fylde Guitars is an English manufacturer of handmade fretted musical instruments.

The company was founded in 1973 by (until then amateur) luthier Roger Bucknall, and remains under his personal control. Originally located in The Fylde, in 1996 the workshop moved to the Lake District, and is today located in Penrith, Cumbria. The firm has four employees including Roger Bucknall.

Their products include acoustic guitars, classical guitars, acoustic bass guitars, mandolins, mandolas, bouzoukis and citterns, including some innovative designs. All their instruments are acoustic, with electric pickups as an option.

== Company history ==
Roger Bucknall was born in Selly Oak, Birmingham in 1950, studied at Bournville Boys Technical School. He read for an honours degree in Mechanical Engineering at Nottingham University before working for Racal Thermionic in Hythe, Hampshire, as a technical author, then mechanical designer for industrial tape recorders from 1971 to 1973.

Fylde Guitars was formed in 1973. Moved to Fylde, Lancashire and now resides in Penrith, Cumbria.

== Snooker ==
From 1981 to 1992, Bucknall indulged his engineering brain in the manufacture of snooker cues and cases. He formed Barracuda Sports, invented the "push on" cue extension and the extruded aluminium cue case. He worked with all the top players of the time, particularly Ray Reardon. Bucknall sold the business in 1992 and relocated to Penrith to re-vitalise the instrument making business

== Present day ==
Today, Fylde Instruments can command high prices and all instruments are hand-made using traditional techniques, while using modern machinery for some of the operations.

Although there is a range of standard instruments that the business builds for customers most of Bucknall's output is a one-off custom guitars. The business has been scaled down to accommodate this approach. Bucknall has two assistants to help create instruments for some of the world's leading players.

== Technical, innovation and awards ==
Roger Bucknall has been credited with the original design of the "A frame" guitar bracing, and is an advocate of the zero fret principle on guitar fingerboards. All of his instruments have been developed in collaboration with professional players.

Bucknall is the only UK guitar maker to be awarded the Acoustic Guitar magazine Gold Award in 2000. He was filmed for the US NAMM oral history program and he is one of only two UK makers to be featured in the American publication Fretboard Journal, the other being his friend Stefan Sobell.

Bucknall was appointed Member of the Order of the British Empire (MBE) in the 2016 New Year Honours for services to guitar making, music, and heritage crafts.
