= Bonny Light Horseman (song) =

Folk song - Roud 1185

"Bonny Light Horseman" (Roud 1185), also known as "Broken Hearted I Will Wander", is a folk song. The singer's romantic interest was killed while fighting against Napoleon in the Peninsular War. It has been recorded by musicians including Nic Jones, Planxty, Lal and Norma Waterson, Lúnasa, Rebecca Fox, Todd Menton, Oisin, Eliza Carthy, James Keelaghan and Nancy Kerr. It was also recorded by Dolores Keane and John Faulkener on their album "Broken Hearted I'll Wander"
