= List of traditional Irish singers =

This is a list of notable traditional singers from Ireland. Some of the singers alphabetically listed below are known to have sung in both the Irish and English language and if so are listed in both sections below as well known singers of macaronic Irish songs.

== Singers (by language) ==
=== Mainly English-language songs ===
==== Men ====
- Paddy Berry, a CCÉ singer
- Eddie Butcher of Magilligan, County Londonderry, singer, song collector and songwriter
- Robert Cinnamond of County Antrim, singer and song collector
- Len Graham, married to Pádraigín Ní Uallacháin, with whom he has recorded numerous albums
- Con Greaney, from County Limerick
- Frank Harte, seminal collector and singer in the English language tradition
- Joe Holmes
- Luke Kelly, from Dublin, best known for co-founding The Dubliners
- Ronnie Drew, another founding member of The Dubliners
- John Reilly
- Paddy Tunney
- Liam Weldon
- Tom Lenihan, Irish sean-nós singer
- Tommy Makem, The Bard of Armagh; sung multiple of his traditional Irish songs with the Clancy Brothers

==== Women ====
- Margaret Barry, Irish Traveller from County Cork, came to prominence in London after starting as a street singer
- Karan Casey from Waterford, formerly a singer with Solas
- Elizabeth "Bess" Cronin
- Cara Dillon from Dungiven, singer and arranger of traditional songs
- Rita Connolly from County Dublin, known for her work with Irish composer, Shaun Davey
- Rosie Stewart from County Fermanagh
- Sarah Makem, source singer from County Armagh
- Sarah Anne O'Neill from County Tyrone, sister of Geordie Hanna
- Caitríona O'Leary
- Niamh Parsons from Dublin, formerly singer with Arcady
- Róisín White from County Down, singer from Ireland who has passed-on songs to Clannad, Mairéad Ní Mhaonaigh, and Altan
- Rita Gallagher from County Donegal, singer with three All-Ireland senior titles and a TG4 Gradam Ceoil as Singer of the Year in 2017

=== Mainly Irish-language songs ===
==== Men ====
Name	Dialect
Tomás Mac Eoin	Connacht Irish (An Cheathrú Rua, Galway Gaeltacht)
Darach Ó Catháin	Connacht Irish (Lettermore, Galway Gaeltacht)
Seán 'ac Dhonncha	Connacht Irish (Carna, Galway Gaeltacht)
Seosamh Ó hÉanaí (Joe Heaney)	Connacht Irish (Carna, Galway Gaeltacht)
Iarla Ó Lionáird	Munster Irish (Muskerry, Cork Gaeltacht)
Liam Ó Maonlaí	Raised in Dublin
Nioclás Tóibín	Munster Irish (Ring, Waterford Gaeltacht)
Diarmuid Ó Suilleabháin	Munster Irish

==== Women ====
Name	Dialect
Muireann Nic Amhlaoibh	Munster Irish (Kerry Gaeltacht)
Máire Ní Bhraonáin	Ulster Irish (Gweedore, Donegal Gaeltacht)
Niamh de Búrca	Raised in Dublin
Treasa Ní Cheannabháin	Connacht Irish (Carna, Galway Gaeltacht)
Lasairfhíona Ní Chonaola	Connacht Irish (Inis Oírr, Galway Gaeltacht)
Maighréad Ní Dhomhnaill	Connacht/Ulster Irish (raised in the Meath Gaeltacht, where Connacht Irish is spoken, but her father was an Irish-speaker from Donegal)
Tríona Ní Dhomhnaill	Connacht/Ulster Irish (raised in the Meath Gaeltacht, where Connacht Irish is spoken, but her father was an Irish-speaker from Donegal)
Róisín Elsafty	Connacht Irish (Galway Gaeltacht)
Aoife Ní Fhearraigh	Ulster Irish (Gweedore, Donegal Gaeltacht)
Mairéad Ní Mhaonaigh	Ulster Irish (Gweedore, Donegal Gaeltacht)
Caitlín Maude (also a poet)	Connacht Irish (Casla, Galway Gaeltacht)
Nóirín Ní Riain	Raised in Limerick
Nan Tom Teaimín de Búrca	
Pádraigín Ní Uallacháin	Raised in Louth
Nell Ní Chróinín	Munster Irish

== See also ==
- Lilting, a traditional singing mode; sometimes called "mouth music"
- Traditional Irish singing
- Celtic music
