= List of TG4 Singer of the Year Award recipients =

List of award winning singers

The TG4 Singer of the Year Award is given annually as part of Gradam Ceoil TG4. The award is to recognise the role of singing in the traditional Irish music world and to ensure the task of carrying forward the Irish oral tradition into the future.

The following is a list of the recipients of the award.

- 2001 – Ciarán Ó Gealbháin, County Waterford
- 2002 – Len Graham, County Antrim
- 2003 – Frank Harte, Dublin
- 2004 – Rosie Stewart, County Fermanagh
- 2005 – Maighread Ní Dhomhnaill, County Donegal
- 2006 – Seán Garvey, County Kerry
- 2007 – Dara Bán Mac Donnchadha, Galway
- 2008 – Iarla Ó Lionáird, County Cork
- 2009 – Sarah Ann O'Neill, County Tyrone
- 2010 – Cathal McConnell, County Fermanagh
- 2011 – Muireann Nic Amhlaoibh, County Kerry
- 2012 – Nell Ní Chróinín, County Cork
- 2013 – Séamus Ó Beaglaoich, County Kerry
- 2014 – Nan Tom Teaimín de Búrca, County Galway
- 2015 – Roisín White, County Down
- 2016 – Pól Ó Ceannabháin, County Galway
- 2017 – Rita Gallagher, County Donegal
- 2018 – Máire Ní Chéileachair, County Cork
- 2019 – Thomas McCarthy, London
- 2020 – Lillis Ó Laoire, Donegal
- 2021 – Niall Hanna, County Tyrone
- 2022 – Sarah Ghriallais, County Galway
