= Irish folk music (1990–1999) =

The 1990s brought a growing international awareness of Irish traditional music, along with a period of economic success for Ireland (the "Celtic Tiger") and the launch of the music-and-dance show Riverdance. In America, the 1991 television series Bringing It All Back Home, produced by Philip King, focussed on the Irish roots of much American music, and was followed by other TV productions also themed around Irish music.

As Irish music became more widely performed and increasingly commercialised, debates arose over issues of "purity" in Irish music in the face of diversifying settings and uses, and also over intellectual property inhering in compositions and recordings in the genre.

== Births and deaths ==
=== Births ===
- Fintan Warfield, born 1992
- SOAK, born 1996

=== Deaths ===
- Tom Clancy, died 1990
- Tom Lenihan, died 1990
- Sean McCarthy, died 1990
- Josie McDermott, died 1992
- Paddy Murphy, died 1992
- Micho Russell, died 1994
- Nioclás Tóibín, died 1994
- Liam Weldon, died 1995
- Seán 'ac Dhonncha, died 1996
- Jimmy Ferguson, died 1997
- Paddy Clancy, died 1998
- Eithne Ní Uallacháin, died 1999

== Recordings ==
- 1990: The Red Crow, by Altan
- 1991: Bringing It All Back Home, by Gerry O'Connor
    - The Song of the Singing Horseman, by Jimmy MacCarthy
    - Essential Pogues, by The Pogues
- 1992: 30 Years A-Greying, by The Dubliners
- 1993: All in Good Time, by Patrick Street
- 1994: Banba, by Clannad
    - Someone to Dance With, by Sonny Condell
    - A Stór Is A Stóirín, by Pádraigín Ní Uallacháin
- 1995: Dirty Rotten Shame, by Ronnie Drew
    - Coming Days, by Ron Kavana
- 1996: Flame, by Johnny Duhan
    - Graffiti Tongue, by Christy Moore
    - Aoife, by Aoife Ní Fhearraigh
- 1997: Talk On Corners, by The Corrs
- 1998: Fire in the Kitchen, by The Chieftains
    - 1798 – The First Year of Liberty, by Frank Harte and Dónal Lunny
- 1999: The Morning Mist, by Joe Burke
    - Otherworld, by Lúnasa
    - Back on Top, by Van Morrison
