= Nonie Lynch =

Irish singer (1910–2011)

Nonie Lynch (née Crawford; 5 February 1910 – 29 September 2011) was an Irish traditional singer from Milltown Malbay, County Clare.

Lynch took part in several editions of The Clare Festival of Traditional Singing, including the first edition to be held outside Ennistymon, which took place in Spanish Point in 2003. At the time of that festival she was already 93 years of age.

Most of her life she was living in the townland Mountscott, Mullagh. The last few years of her life were spent in a nursing home in Liscannor.

== CD's ==
Songs of Nonie Lynch were recorded and brought out at:

- Around the Hills of Clare (CD 1, track 10: Shannon Scheme; CD 2, track 17: My Good Looking Man)
- Cascades of Song, Clare Festival of traditional singing (1991-1999)

== Family ==
Nonie Lynch was the youngest child of Richard Crawford and Mary Linehan.

Her son, Patrick Lynch (born 1954) is a singer and poetry reciter. Her daughter, Mrs Claire Burke, became a hotelier at the Armada Hotel in Spanish Point.

Nonie Lynch was a first cousin of the musician Tom Lenihan.

== See also ==
- Len Graham (singer)
- Frank Harte
- Willie Clancy (musician)
- Kitty Hayes
