= Nioclás Tóibín =

Irish singer of the 20th century

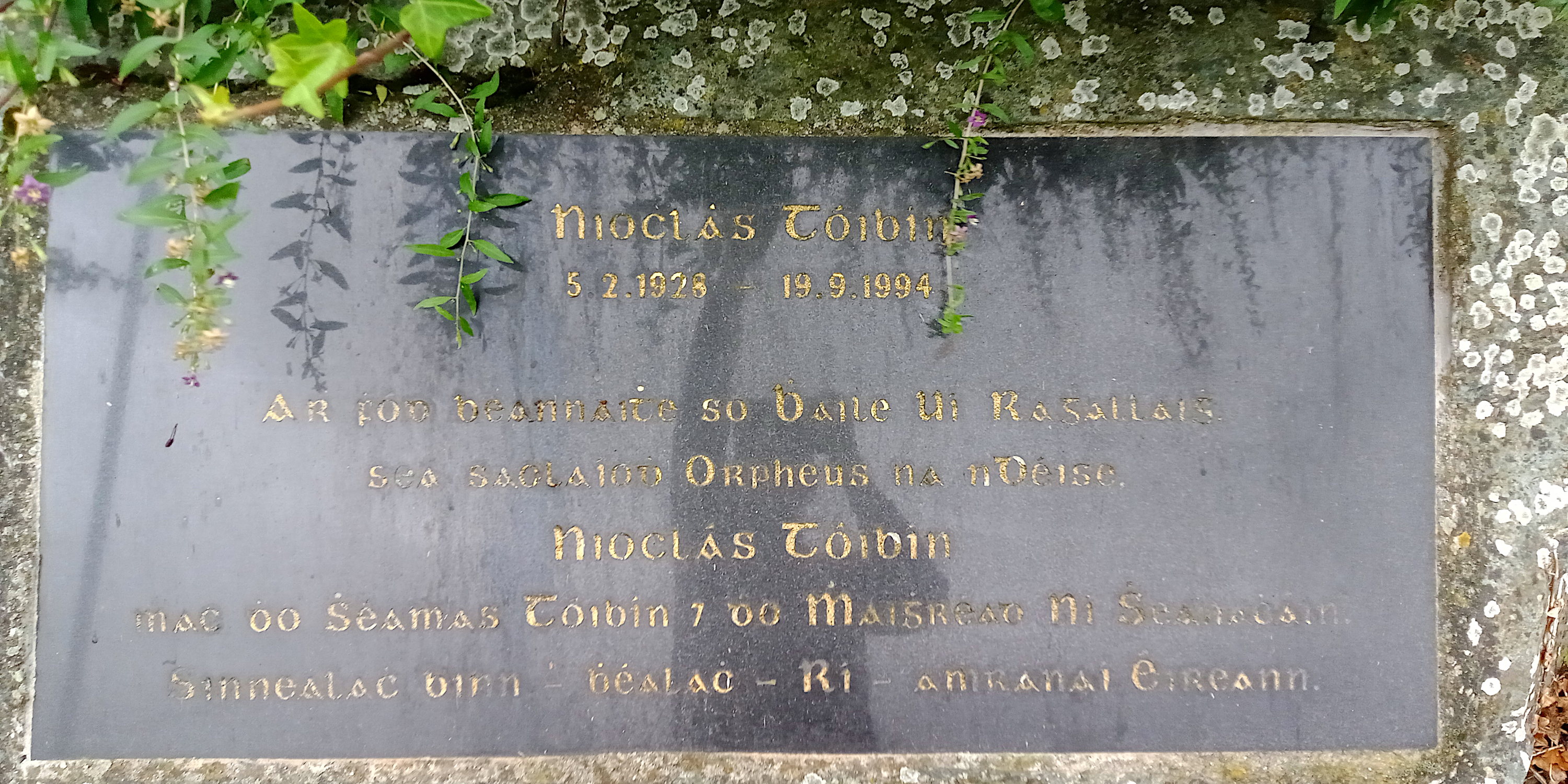
Plaque for Nioclás Tóibín

Nioclás Tóibín (5 February 1928 – 19 September 1994) was a sean-nós singer from the Déise tradition of County Waterford in Ireland. Nioclás was the winner of the main competition at Oireachtas na Gaeilge (this award is now called Corn Uí Riada) consecutively from 1961 to 1963. This was the principal national singing prize in Ireland at the time.

Born in the Gaeltacht parish of An Rinn (Ring) in County Waterford. His father and mother, Séamas Tóibín and Maighréad Ní Sheanacháin, were well known singers in the sean-nós style who had inherited the tradition from their own parents. Nioclás was known to sing songs such as 'Ar Éirinn Ní Neosfainn Cé Hí', 'Na Connerys' and 'Róisín Dubh'.

== See also ==
- Traditional Irish Singers
