= Joe Holmes (singer) =

- Born: Joe Holmes; 1906; Killyramer, near Ballymoney, County Antrim, Ireland
- Died: January 1978 (aged 71–72)
- Genres: Irish traditional music, Sean-nós
- Occupation: Musician
- Instruments: Fiddle, singing

Joe Holmes (1906 – 5 January 1978) was a fiddler, lilter and traditional singer from County Antrim, Northern Ireland.

== Biography ==
Holmes's brother Harry had brought him home a present of his first fiddle on his return from the Great War. Holmes's first job was carrying the red warning flag in front of the steam roller, which took him travelling all around the country in a caravan. He took his fiddle on these trips. Some of the fiddle favourites included: "The Boys of Ballycastle", "The Blackberry Blossom", "Royal Charlie", "Wellington’s Medal" and "Rodney’s Glory". Holmes left the roadwork and worked at flax-scutching, first for a small mill near Killyrammer, and then into Milltown Mill, in Ballymoney. He then took up a healthier job as a green-keeper for Ballymoney Bowling club.

== Recordings ==
All of Joe Holmes's recordings were made with Len Graham with whom he began regularly attending music sessions around Ireland in the 1960s.

Their first album was Chaste Muses, Bards and Sages, which includes solo singing by both as well as duets and lilting. The record became an instant hit and Len’s assured singing coupled with Joe’s verve, and his huge store of songs, made them firm favourites in clubs, concerts and festivals. Sadly, Joe Holmes died just a fortnight after completing the recording of their follow-up LP, After Dawning, in 1978.

== BBC Radio Documentary ==
On 6 January 1980 a radio documentary tribute to Joe Holmes compiled by David Hammond was broadcast on BBC Radio Ulster. Contributors on the programme were Len Graham, Geordie Hanna, Frank Harte, Jeannie McGrath, Sarah Ann O'Neill and Paddy Tunney.

The programme was called Joe Holmes: A Parting Glass, BBC Programme number: 140U540, Catalogue Number: 9517794, Duration 0:29:08

== Discography ==
=== Joe Holmes and Len Graham ===
- Chaste Muses, Bards and Sages (Free Reed, 1976) – FRR 007
- After Dawning (Topic, 1979) – 12TS401

=== Compilations ===
- A Living Thing: Contemporary Classics Of Traditional Irish Music (Globestyle, 1997) – CD. Various artists. Features two songs by Joe Holmes and Len Graham: "The Girl That Broke My Heart" and "The Parting Glass".
- I Once Was A Daysman & Chaste Muses, Bards & Sages (Free Reed, 2008) – FRRR-08/FRRRS-128 CD. Remastered albums by Eddie Butcher / Joe Holmes and Len Graham.

== See also ==
- Comhaltas Ceoltóirí Éireann
