= Hugh Shields =

- Born: Hugh Edwin Shields; 8 September 1929
- Origin: Belfast, Northern Ireland
- Died: 16 July 2008 (aged 78) Dublin, Ireland
- Occupations: Lecturer, writer, song collector

Dr Hugh Shields (8 September 1929 – 16 July 2008) was an authority on Irish traditional music and a founder member of the Folk Music Society of Ireland (FMSI) and the Irish Traditional Music Archive (ITMA). He was also a senior lecturer in French at Trinity College, Dublin. He published a number of works on Irish music and folklore.

Throughout his career, Shields made field recordings of old traditional songs from people around Ireland, mainly in northern counties – Donegal and Derry, also in Antrim and Down as well in Belfast. Further south he collected in Dublin and elsewhere (including counties Wexford, Wicklow and Louth). He also collected extensively in France. His collecting mainly focused on adult song, but he also recorded children's songs and rhymes when the opportunity presented itself. His collection of Irish children's songs, games and riddles now forms the basis for an online exhibition in ITMA.

He eventually donated his entire sound collection – more than 150 documented reel-to-reel tapes (now digitized) – to the ITMA archive.

== Early life and academic career ==
Shields was born in Belfast in 1929 and attended secondary school at the Royal Belfast Academical Institution. He won a scholarship to Trinity College, Dublin, where he took a degree in French and Spanish. He became a junior lecturer there in 1954, full lecturer in 1965 and senior lecturer in 1978. He was made a full fellow of the college in 1980. His 1966 doctoral thesis was titled An Old French Book of Legends and its Apocalyptic Background.

After his retirement in 1994, he continued teaching traditional music for another four years there in the school of music, where he had worked part-time since 1982.

After graduating, Shields spent a year teaching French and German at Coleraine Academical Institution. It was while teaching in Coleraine, in 1953, that he first met the Magilligan singer and roadworker Eddie Butcher and started collecting traditional music. His friendship with Butcher provided him with a collection of songs, which formed the basis of much of his later research and publication activities.

Shields edited his field recordings for several record companies and for the Ulster Folk and Transport Museum. He also contributed articles to a number of national and international journals.

He also collaborated with the Dublin collector Tom Munnelly.

== Publications ==
Many books, articles and audio field recordings by Shields were published during or after his lifetime. In addition he was a regular broadcaster and lecturer on traditional music and culture

=== Books ===
Shields wrote or edited a number of books on Irish folk music, songs and musical history. He also wrote on medieval French literature. These include, in chronological order:

- Livre de Sibile, by Philippe de Thaon, edited by Hugh Shields (1979), London: Anglo-Norman Text Society. ISBN 978-0905474052 (Shields identified this anonymous poem as the work of this early medieval poet, who wrote in the Anglo-Norman dialect of old French).
- Shamrock, Rose and Thistle: Folk Singing in North Derry, by Hugh Shields (1981). Belfast: Blackstaff Press. ISBN 0 85640 166 8 . It is out of print, but it forms the basis of an online exhibition at the Irish Traditional Music Archive (ITMA). This includes sound tracks of the original recordings of all 74 songs printed in the book. A facsimile PDF of the book can be also be downloaded.
- Ballad Research. The Stranger in Ballad Narrative and other Topics. Papers read at the European Ballad Conference. Dublin 1985, ed. Hugh Shields [1987], Dublin: FMSI. ISBN 0-905733-02-9
- Narrative Singing in Ireland: Lays, Ballads, Come-all-yes and other Songs, by Hugh Shields (1993), Dublin: Irish Academic Press. ISBN 978-0-7165-2462-5 (out of print, but a PDF is available from ITMA website)
- Tunes of the Munster Pipers: Irish Traditional Music from the James Goodman Manuscripts, Volume 1, edited by Hugh Shields (1988), Dublin: Irish Traditional Music Archive (reprinted in 2016 with minor presentational alterations). ISBN 978-0-9532704-0-8 (hardback), ISBN 978-0-9532704-1-5 (paperback)
- All the Days of his Life : Eddie Butcher in his Own Words : Songs, Stories and Memories of Magilligan, Co Derry, by Hugh Shields, edited by Lisa Shields (2011). Dublin: Irish Traditional Music Archive (accompanied by 3 CDs). ISBN 978-0-9532704-4-6. Out of print, it has been reissued as a digital online version by ITMA , with playlists of the tracks of the 3 CDs. A PDF of the book can be downloaded there.
- Tunes of the Munster Pipers: Irish Traditional Music from the James Goodman Manuscripts, Volume 2, edited by Hugh and Lisa Shields (2013), Dublin: Irish Traditional Music Archive. ISBN 978-0-9532704-5-3 (hardback), ISBN 978-0-9532704-6-0 (paperback).

=== Discography ===
Adam in Paradise, Ulster Folk Museum (1969). EP 1677-EP

Folk Ballads of Derry and Donegal (1972). Leader Sound, LP: LEA4055

Chants Corréziens: French Folk Songs from Corrèze (1974) Topic, LP: 12 T 246

Shamrock , Rose and Thistle: Eddie Butcher (1976). Leader, LP: LED 2070

=== Articles in journals ===
Apart from numerous reviews in Irish and foreign journals or proceedings, Shields wrote many articles from 1963 onwards, including the following:

- 'Un manuscrit d'André Chénier retrouvé.'(1963)
- 'A Scottish and an Irish ballad from Co. Derry' (1963)'
- 'A latter-day pastourelle: the Factory girl (1963)
- 'Four songs from Glendalough' (1963)'
- 'Philippe de Thaon, auteur du "Livre de Sibylle" ?' (1964)
- 'Some bonny female sailors' (1964)
- 'Miscellanea from Eileen Keaney' (1965)
- 'More female sailors' [1965?]
- 'An Index to Allingham's "Irish ballad singers"' (1967)
- Songs from County Wexford' (1968)
- 'The valley of Colmcille'(1970)
- 'Some "Songs and ballads in use in the province of Ulster . . . 1845"' (1971)
- 'Saint Paul aux enfers: notice d'un incunable en français' (1971)
- 'Singing traditions of a bilingual parish in North-West Ireland' (1971)
- 'Some "Songs and ballads in use in the province of Ulster . . .1845": Texts' (1972)
- 'The dead lover's return in modern English ballad tradition' (1972)
- 'Old British ballads in Ireland' (1972)
- 'Bishop Turpin and the source of Nycodemus gospel' (1972)
- 'Bartok and folk music' (1972–73) in Irish Folk Music Studies 1, pp 60–63. ISSN 0332-298X
- 'Carolling at New Ross, 1265' (1973)
- 'Supplementary syllables in Anglo-Irish folk singing' (1973)
- 'A text of Nicole Bozon's "Proverbes de bon enseignement" in Irish transmission' (1974)
- 'William Alllingham and folk song' (1974)
- 'The proper words: a discussion on folk song and literary poetry' (1975)
- 'Irish folk-song recordings 1966–1972: an index of tapes in the Ulster Folk and Transport Museum', by Hugh and Lisa Shields (1975)
- 'The walling of New Ross: a 13th-century poem in French' (1975–76) in Long Room 12 & 13, pp 24–33
- 'Amhráin bheannaithe as co. na Gaillimhe agus as Tír Chonaill', by Angela Partridge and Hugh Shields (1976–81) in Irish Folk Music Studies 3, pp18–44 . ISSN 0332-298X
- 'New dates for old songs' (1979) in Long Room 18–19, pp 34–41
- 'Oral techniques in written verse: Philippe de Thaon's "Livre de Sibile"' (1980)
- 'Oliver Goldsmith and popular song' (1983) in Long Room 26–27, pp 27–36
- 'Singing in Arranmore, Donegal, 1977' (1984)
- 'Scots ballad influences in Ireland', by Hugh Shields and Tom Munnelly (1979)
- 'A singer of poems: Jimmy McCurry of Myroe' (1981)
- 'Encore' (1986)
- 'Collecting songs "by hand" in the fifties' [1986–2001]
- 'Popular broadsides in the Library of the Royal Society of Antiquaries of Ireland'(1987)
- 'Varieties of the supernatural in song' (1992–93)

=== Articles in encyclopedias or books ===
- 'The "Grey Cock": dawn song or revenant ballad?' (1976) in Ballad Studies, ed. E.B. Lyle, pp 185–204. ISBN 978-0-87471-898-0
- 'Nineteenth-century Irish song chapbooks and ballad sheets' (1986) in Treasures of the Library, Trinity College Dublin, ed. Peter Fox, pp 197–204. ISBN 978-0-901714-46-6
- 'Literacy and the ballad genre in Ireland' (1982) in Aspecten van het Europese Marktlied, pp 151–65
- 'Impossibles in ballad style' (1983) in The ballad image, ed. James Porter, pp 192–214. ISBN 978-0-912513-00-3
- 'Printed aids to folk singing, 1700–1900' (1990) in The Origins of Popular Literacy in Ireland, ed. Mary Daly & David Dixon, pp 139–152. ISBN 978-0-9511257-1-7.
- 'A history of the "Lass of Aughrim"' (1990) in Musicology in Ireland, ed. Gerard Gillen & Harry White, pp 58–73. ISBN 978-0-7165-2456-4
- 'James Goodman' (1999) in The Companion to Irish Traditional Music, ed. Fintan Vallely, pp 153–155. ISBN 978-0-8147-8802-8
- 'France' (2000) in The Garland Encyclopedia of World Music, Vol. 8 Europe, ed. Timothy Rice et al., New York: Routledge, pp 539–557. ISBN 978-0-8240-6034-3
- 'Ireland' (2000) The Garland Encyclopedia of World Music, Vol. 8 Europe, ed. Timothy Rice et al., New York: Routledge, pp 378–90, 383–97. ISBN 978-0-8240-6034-3

=== Broadcasts ===
From 1957 into the 1970s Shields made about a dozen radio programmes for RTÉ or BBC Northern Ireland. These include the following examples:

- As I was Goin' Along the Road. with songs sung by Jerry Hicks (BBC NI, 1957)
- Bards and Ballad Makers, with songs sung by Paddy Tunney (RTÉ, June 1961)
- Some Bonny Irish Sailors, with singing by Paddy Tunney and Hugh Shields (RTÉ, October 1962
- Tops and Tails, with singing by Paddy Tunney and Hugh Shields (RTÉ, April 1967)
- Shamrock Rose and Thistle, with singing by Eddie Butcher (RTÉ, July 1967)
- Adieu to Belashanny (1971) [A musical recreation by Shields in his own words of the folk poetry of William Allingham]
- Of Joy and Youth: Music and Poetry of the Troubadours (RTÉ September 1978, Part 1). It includes singing in Occitan by Shields and two others.
- Of Joy and Youth: Music and Poetry of the Troubadours (RTÉ September 1978, Part 2). It includes singing in Occitan by Shields and two others

== Folk Music Society of Ireland ==
Shields was a founder member of the Folk Music Society of Ireland or FMSI, along with Seóirse Bodley (chairperson) , Breandán Breathnach, Tom Munnelly, Alf MacLochlainn, Frank Harte, Caitlín Uí Éigeartaigh, Douglas Sealy and others. The society was founded in 1971 with the aims of encouraging interest and promoting research in the traditional song, music and dance of Ireland. For the next thirty years, it was involved in organising a programme of public lectures, recitals and seminars. Shields was its first honorary secretary, and edited both the society's journal, Éigse Cheol Tíre / Irish Folk Music Studies (ISSN 0332-298X) and a newsletter titled Ceol Tíre. The 33 issues of the newsletter have been made available from the Irish Traditional Music Archive (ITMA) website.
