= The Clare Festival of Traditional Singing =

The Clare Festival of Traditional Singing (Irish: Féile Amhránaíochta an Chláir) is a festival held in Milltown Malbay and Spanish Point in the month of November. The aim of the festival is to promote unaccompanied traditional singing.

== History ==
In 1989, Anthony Edwards, librarian of the Ennistymon branch of the Clare County Library, and Maureen Rynne, joined to organise a festival to promote traditional singing. Later, Tom Munnelly joined the organizing committee. The first festival took place in June 1990 and was opened by the then president of Ireland, Patrick Hillery.

In its first years (1990–2002), the festival was held in Ennistymon. Due to the ill health of Munnelly the festival was moved to Spanish Point, but after two editions there (2003 and 2004), it ceased to exist. After Munnelly's death in 2007, interest raised again and a new series started in 2010. It is now also a commemoration of Munnelly.

== Notable participants ==
- Nóirín Ní Riain (2000)
- Nonie Lynch (2003)
- Naisrín Elsafty (2010)
- Róisín White (2003, 2015)
