= Agallamh beirte =

Form of oral poetry in the Irish language

Agallamh beirte (Irish for "conversation of two people") is a form of Irish-language spoken poetry, wherein two people recite a dialogue in verse, often rhyming. Tones are typically humorous and satirical. It is often part of Irish-language culture events and competitions, such as Oireachtas na Gaeilge.
