= Ciarán Ó Con Cheanainn =

Ciarán Ó Con Cheanainn (12 July 1981 – 4 February 2009) was an Irish scholar, teacher and youngest winner of the Corn Uí Riada.

Ó Con Cheanainn was born in Galway. He was the youngest winner of the prestigious sean-nós Corn Uí Riada singing competition at Oireachtas na Gaeilge, an annually held arts festival of Irish culture.

He studied at NUI Galway, graduating in 2002 with first class honours in Irish and geography. In 2003 he was awarded an MA at UCD having completed his thesis, "Gnéithe de Sheachadadh na nAmhrán Traidisiúnta sa Ghaeilge." The following year he completed his thesis "Clár Amhrán Chois Fharraige", securing an M Litt in Modern Irish.

The National University of Ireland in 2004 awarded him a travelling studentship in Celtic Studies, and he spent two years at Edinburgh University’s school of Scottish studies. A regular competitor at Oireachtas na Gaeilge and Fleadh Ceoil na hÉireann, he won many prizes. He represented Ireland at the International Pan-Celtic Festival in 1999 and 2000, taking first prize on both occasions.

He was a member of the committee of An Cumann le Béaloideas Éireann, and served on the board of Comhar for six years. His published work includes entries for The Encyclopaedia of Music in Ireland and Leabhar Mór na hAmhrán (both forthcoming), and articles and reviews for the Journal of Music in Ireland. He made a number of recordings of his singing, and had recently participated in the Cumann Merriman winter school.

Ciarán had recently been appointed to a lectureship in Modern Irish at UCD, and was looking forward to the completion of his doctoral thesis and the publication of two substantial books on the singing tradition of his native Conamara. Ciarán died suddenly on 4 February 2009 at 27 years of age.

Preceded by Micheál Ó Confhaola	Corn Uí Riada singer of the year 2008 - 2009	Succeeded by Doimnic Mac Giolla Bhríde
