= Con Greaney =

Irish singer

- Born: January 1912; Rooska, County Limerick, Ireland
- Died: 22 June 2001 (aged 89); Newcastle West, Limerick, Ireland
- Genres: Sean-nós
- Occupation: Singer
- Labels: Cló Iar-Chonnacht

Con Greaney (1912–2001) was a traditional Irish singer from the Rosska area of West County Limerick in Ireland. Described as for having a "huge store of traditional songs", he was known for singing in an unaffected traditional style. Greaney was particularly associated with the comic singing tradition. An entry on the Cló Iar-Chonnacht website described Greaney as being "Full of fun, good humour and devilment" and stated that he "was a widely loved character whose animated delivery of songs invariably guarantee[d] him standing ovations". Greaney died on 22 June 2001, aged 89.

== Recordings ==
In addition to being recorded by the Irish Traditional Music Archive, songs by Con Greaney have appeared on:

- Traditional Singer, Oidhreacht, 1991, OIDH 002, including tracks "My Cock Crew" and "Around the Hills of Clare"
- Cascades Of Song, Various Singers, "A Tinker I Am" sung by Con Greaney (written by Sean Carthy), Catalogue Number: CFTS001, Claddagh Records, 2008
- The Road to Athea, Clo Iar Chonnachta, CIC 082, including recordings of:
  1. "My Trousers Turned Back"
  2. "The Milltown Boy"
  3. "Carlow Town"
  4. "Will I Ever Forget The Day"
  5. "Ar Éirinn Ní Neosfainn Cé hÍ"
  6. "The Road To Athea"
  7. "Eileen O"
  8. "The Vales of New Dirreen"
  9. "The Cheese"
  10. "Nancy Hogan"
