= Eddie Butcher =

- Born: 8 May 1900; Magilligan, County Londonderry, Ireland
- Died: 8 September 1980 (aged 80)
- Genre: Traditional Irish
- Occupations: Singer, songwriter, folk-song collector
- Labels: Ulster Folk, Leader, Free Reed, Outlet, FMSI, ITMA

Eddie Butcher (8 May 1900 – 8 September 1980) was an Irish traditional singer, folk-song collector and songwriter from Magilligan, County Londonderry. He had an extensive repertoire of songs that he performed in a sturdy, earthy style. In 1953, Dr. Hugh Shields began to notate and record Butcher's songs, published later in two books: Shamrock, Rose & Thistle (1981) and All the Days of his Life (2011), the latter accompanied by a set of three CDs. Starting in 1966, Butcher performed in frequent radio broadcasts from Dublin and Belfast, and recorded four albums of his songs, on one EP and three LPs.

He inspired other singers such as Joe Holmes, Len Graham, and Frank Harte, as well as a younger generation of musicians, notably Andy Irvine and Paul Brady who added musical accompaniment to some of his songs.

== Early life and employment ==
Eddie Butcher was born on 8 May 1900, in a house that stood on the dividing line between the small townlands of Duncrun and Tamlaght, and lived all his life in Magilligan, County Londonderry. He was the fifth of John and Elizabeth (Clyde) Butcher's ten children brought up from the 1890s to the 1920s, and whose names are, in order of seniority: Robert, Katey, Rose, Patrick, Eddie, John, Willy, Maggie, Lily, and Jimmy. All except Lily were singers and those who were old enough learned the core of their repertory from their father, who died in 1920 and had been a daysman, or day labourer for local farmers.

Butcher started work by lifting potatoes at the age of 12, and later went for hiring at "the Rabble" and "the Gallop", the hiring fairs in Coleraine and Limavady respectively, in May and November. By the time he was 20, he was a daysman himself. In his late twenties, he turned from farm work to a variety of other jobs, such a working as a gardener and handyman, peat-cutting, building, road-making, thatching and working in a quarry, often cycling long distances to and from work each day.

Before he retired, he spent 18 years with the Ministry of Agriculture on the River Roe drainage project.

== Singing career ==
Both Butcher and his wife Gracie (née Kerr (Note: The spelling of Gracie Butcher's maiden name is unclear: her birth certificate at GRONI spells it "Kerr", whereas Dr Hugh Shields spells it phonetically as "Carr".)), whom he married on 7 February 1934, came from noted local singing families, and whenever there was a dance or another occasion in the vicinity, Butcher's father would be asked to come along to sing, and the brothers and sisters of both families were also well-known performers, locally. During Butcher's childhood, their house was always one of the most popular cèilidh houses in Magilligan, with neighbours dropping in regularly for a night of craic, until the practice died out in the area.

Before he left home, Butcher learned the greater part of his repertoire from his father and, later, from his brothers and from Gracie's sisters. He also had a gift for writing his own songs, set to traditional airs and often about local events or his own experience as a farm labourer or road worker in later life. (Note: Hugh Shields wrote: "Eddie was a farm labourer in his youth and a road worker in later life. Some of his own compositions reflect his experience: "The Anglers on the Roe", "The Bureau", "The Concrete Mile", "Down By The Drainside" (a single verse), "The Longfield Bank", "Magilligan Gaelic Team", "The Myroe Floods", "The New Mallard Bar", "The New Tractor", "The Point Fair", "The Roe Bridge", "The Smuggler", "The Walling of the Men". For text added to existing songs, see "Carrowclare", "Close of an Irish Day" and "The Trader".") From 1953 onwards, (Note: Hugh Shields wrote: "In 1953–[195]4 regularly and in 1955 briefly I noted about sixty song texts and melodies in MS [manuscript] sung in his house mainly by himself. I recorded him there and in Downhill in 1961; at home, 1964; at home and in Dublin, 1966, 1968; at home, 1969, 1970, 1975; in Dublin, 1975; at home 1977, 1979.") he was regularly interviewed by Hugh Shields, who recorded about sixty songs from him within a couple of years, either in manuscript form or, later, through tape recording equipment, and published some of these songs in the 1981 book Shamrock, Rose & Thistle.

In 1966, Butcher began to sing frequently on radio from Dublin or Belfast and some of his songs were released on discs, first in 1969 on the EP Adam in Paradise, followed in 1976 by an LP, also titled Shamrock, Rose & Thistle. These radio broadcasts brought him some renown, and attracted the attention of local tradition bearers like Joe Holmes (1906-1978) and Len Graham (b. 1944), with whom he sang and performed. They joined him at his home for the 1975 sessions that yielded two albums of rare Ulster songs: Butcher's I Once Was a Daysman, and Chaste Muses, Bards and Sages by Holmes & Graham. Other frequent visitors to his house included Jackie Devenney (Coleraine), Brian Mullen (Derry), and occasionally Andy Irvine (b. 1942) who, along with Paul Brady (b. 1947), has re-interpreted several of Butcher's songs since the 1970s, often by adding instrumental accompaniment. In 1978, Butcher released his final album: Sings the Titanic and Other Traditional Folk Songs. Two cassettes, featuring eight previously unreleased songs and entitled Shamrock, Rose & Thistle 2 and Shamrock, Rose & Thistle 3, were released posthumously in 1983 by Shields on behalf of the Folk Music Society of Ireland.

Some of the songs in Butcher's repertoire had also been collected from other sources by Sam Henry for inclusion in his column, Songs of the People, published weekly in Coleraine's Northern Constitution from 1923 until 1939. This treasury of nearly 700 songs fostered many recordings from the 1950s onwards, and several of these songs are therefore listed as having been recorded by Butcher, and other singers, in the book Sam Henry's Songs of the People, published in 1990.

In 2011, the Irish Traditional Music Archive published the book All the Days of His Life, releasing Shields' extensive work, edited by his wife Lisa Shields and Nicholas Carolan, and telling Butcher's story in his own words. The book is accompanied by three CDs containing a further 67 songs of Butcher's previously unreleased recordings.

== Death ==
Eddie Butcher died on 8 September 1980. An article entitled "An old friend: Eddie Butcher" was published in issue No. 18 (November 1980) of the Folk Music Society of Ireland's newsletter, Ceol Tíre, in which Shields stated:

The death of Eddie Butcher on 8 September has robbed us of the finest folk singer I have had for a friend, and of a man of great warmth and humanity. (...) The word to describe him rhymes with his name: steady. A dependable character if there was one, as steady as the 'Rock' below which he lived his life; full of obstinate ideas of his own, and loving to be praised; deeply imbued with his own culture and only really happy in its familiar surroundings. (...)

— Hugh Shields, "An old friend: Eddie Butcher"; in "Ceol Tíre" (1980).

== Discography ==
=== Solo recordings ===
- Adam in Paradise (Ulster Folk UFM.1 EP, 1969) – Release of: "The Inniskilling Dragoon", "I Long For to Get Married", "Adam in Paradise" and "The Cocks Are Crowing"
- Shamrock Rose & Thistle (Leader LED 2070 LP, 1976) – Release of 14 songs
- I Once Was a Daysman (Free Reed FRR 003 LP, 1976) – Release of 11 songs
- Sings The Titanic and Other Traditional Folk Songs (Outlet OAS3007 LP, 1978) – Release of 14 songs
- Shamrock Rose & Thistle 2 (FMSI cassette, 1983) – Release of: "Alexander", "The Faughan Side", "The Mason's Word", and the last verse of "The Banks of Kilrea"
- Shamrock Rose & Thistle 3 (FMSI cassette, 1983) – Release of: a song fragment of "The Bonny Irish Boy", "Down By the Canal", "Pat Reilly", and "The Widows Daughter"
- Adam in Paradise (ITMA 101 CD, 2005) – Re-release of the 1969 EP
- All the Days of His Life : Eddie Butcher in His Own Words (ITMA 3x CDs set, 2011) – Release of 67 previously unreleased songs sung by Eddie Butcher, as a set of companion recordings to the book of the same title with the lyrics and notated music of all the songs. This is out of print, but audio playlist of the 67 tracks are available at The Irish Traditional Music Archive:

=== Compilations ===
- Folk Ballads from Donegal and Derry (Leader LEA 4055 LP, 1972) – Includes Butcher's "The Bride Stolen By Fairies" and "The Widow's Daughter"
- Come Let Us Buy the Licence (The Voice of the People Vol. 1) (Topic TSCD651 CD, 1998) – Includes Butcher's "David's Flowery Vale"
- Farewell, My Own Dear Native Land (The Voice of the People Vol. 4) (Topic TSCD654, CD 1998) – Includes Butcher's "Killyclare"
- Come All My Lads That Follow the Plough (The Voice of the People Vol. 5) (Topic TSCD655 CD, 1998) – Includes Butcher's "Tossing The Hay"
- Tonight I'll Make You My Bride (The Voice of the People Vol. 6) (Topic TSCD656 CD, 1998) – Includes Butcher's "Another Man's Wedding"
- This Label is Not Removable (Free Reed FRTCD 25; 3x CDs set, 2002) – Includes Butcher's "Let them come to Ireland", "Down the moor", and "The Hiring Fair"
- Revival re: Masters (Free Reed FRRRS-128; 18x CDs box set, 2008) – Includes 1x CD combining Butcher's I Once Was A Daysman (11 songs, plus a bonus track: "The Mountain Streams") with Chaste Muses, Bards & Sages (9 songs) by Joe Holmes and Len Graham

== Bibliography ==
- Shields, Hugh; Shields, Lisa; Carolan, Nicholas, eds. (2011). All the Days of His Life : Eddie Butcher in His Own Words. Dublin, Ireland: Irish Traditional Music Archive. ISBN 978-0-9532704-4-6. This is out of print, but a PDF of the book is available at The Irish Traditional Music Archive (ITMA)
- Huntington, Gale; Herrmann, Lani; Moulden, John, eds. (1990). Sam Henry's Songs of the People. Athens, GA and London: The University of Georgia Press. ISBN 0-8203-1258-4.
- Shields, Hugh (1981). Shamrock, Rose & Thistle: Folk Singing in North Derry. Belfast: Blackstaff Press. ISBN 978-0-85640-166-4. This is long out of print, but a PDF of the book is available at the Irish Traditional Music Archive (ITMA). where it is the basis of an online exhibition, which includes the original field recordings of all the 74 songs printed in the book.

== Song collection ==
The following two tables show the songs from Butcher's collection that were recorded and published in print.

=== List of recorded songs ===
- Song title – the title of the song; an asterisk (*) indicates Eddie Butcher wrote the song (this column is sortable)
- Singer – the name of the singer (this column is sortable)
- Album – the title of the album featuring the recorded song (this column is sortable)
- Year – the year the album was released (this column is sortable)
- Notes – a reference about the song and/or its recording (this column is not sortable).

Song title	Singer	Album	Year	Notes
"A Creel of Peats"	Eddie Butcher	Shamrock, Rose & Thistle	1976	
"Adam in Paradise"	Eddie Butcher	Adam in Paradise	1969	
"Adam in Paradise"	Andy Irvine	Made in Cork	1997	
"Alexander"	Eddie Butcher	Shamrock, Rose and Thistle 2	1983	
"Ann Jane Thornton"	Eddie Butcher	All the Days of His Life	2011	
"Anglers on the Roe (The)" (*)	Eddie Butcher	All the Days of His Life	2011	
"Another Man's Wedding"	Eddie Butcher	Shamrock, Rose & Thistle	1976	
"Another Man's Wedding"	Eddie Butcher	Tonight I'll Make You My Bride	1978	
"Baltimore"	Eddie Butcher	All the Days of His Life	2011	
"Banks of Kilrea (The)" (last verse)	Eddie Butcher	Shamrock, Rose and Thistle 2	1983	
"Barbara Allen"	Eddie Butcher	All the Days of His Life	2011	
"Benevenagh Surrounded in Snow"	Eddie Butcher	All the Days of His Life	2011	
"Bonny Irish Boy (The)"	Eddie Butcher	Shamrock, Rose and Thistle 3	1983	
"Bonny Irish Boy (The)"	Eddie Butcher	All the Days of His Life	2011	
"Boyne Water"	Eddie Butcher	All the Days of His Life	2011	
"Bride Stolen by Fairies (The)"	Eddie Butcher	Folk Ballads from Donegal and Derry	1972	
"Brisk Young Butcher (The)"	Eddie Butcher	All the Days of His Life	2011	
"Bureau (The)" (*)	Eddie Butcher	All the Days of His Life	2011	
"Burning of Downhill Castle (The)"	Eddie Butcher	All the Days of His Life	2011	
"Castle Maid (The)"	Eddie Butcher	All the Days of His Life	2011	
"Cocks Are Crowing (The)"	Eddie Butcher	Adam in Paradise	1969	
"Coleraine Regatta"	Eddie Butcher	I Once Was a Daysman	1976	
"Come All You Fair Maids"	Eddie Butcher	All the Days of His Life	2011	
"Concrete Mile (The)" (*)	Eddie Butcher	All the Days of His Life	2011	
"Conversation"	Eddie Butcher	Shamrock, Rose & Thistle	1976	
"Cricket Club & Ball (The)"	Eddie Butcher	All the Days of His Life	2011	
"Cuckoo's Nest (The)"	Eddie Butcher	All the Days of His Life	2011	
"Dandy Mick McCluskey"	Eddie Butcher	Sings the Titanic	1978	
"Dandy Mick McCluskey"	Eddie Butcher	All the Days of His Life	2011	
"David's Flowery Vale"	Eddie Butcher	Shamrock, Rose & Thistle	1976	
"David's Flowery Vale"	Eddie Butcher	Come Let Us Buy the Licence	1998	
"Daysman (The)"	Eddie Butcher	Shamrock, Rose & Thistle	1976	
"Don't Come Again"	Eddie Butcher	Shamrock, Rose & Thistle	1976	
"Don't Come Again"	Paul Brady	Welcome Here Kind Stranger	1978	(Note: Paul Brady wrote: "Hugh Shields first recorded this from Eddie Butcher of Magilligan, Co. Derry, in 1966. The version I sing comes from a later recording also by Hugh Shields, of Eddie and his wife Gracie singing it together in 1975. Eddie Butcher, as a singer and a source of songs, has had an immeasurable impact on the young singers of my generation, particularly those from Ulster.")
"Down By the Canal"	Eddie Butcher	Shamrock, Rose and Thistle 3	1983	
"Down the Moor"	Eddie Butcher	This Label Is Not Removable	2002	
"Down the Moor"	Eddie Butcher	All the Days of His Life	2011	
"Drawing Buckets of Water"	Eddie Butcher	All the Days of His Life	2011	
"Drogheda Festival (The)"	Eddie Butcher	All the Days of His Life	2011	
"Easy-Gaan Tom"	Eddie Butcher	All the Days of His Life	2011	
"Eddie Talk out"	Eddie Butcher	Sings the Titanic	1978	
"English Harvest (The)"	Eddie Butcher	All the Days of His Life	2011	
"Fan (The)"	Eddie Butcher	Shamrock, Rose & Thistle	1976	
"Farmer's Daughter (The)"	Eddie Butcher	Shamrock, Rose & Thistle	1976	
"Faughan Side (The)"	Eddie Butcher	Shamrock, Rose and Thistle 2	1983	
"Flora"	Eddie Butcher	I Once Was a Daysman	1976	
"Flower Of Corbymill"	Eddie Butcher	Sings the Titanic	1978	
"Flower Of Corbymill"	Eddie Butcher	All the Days of His Life	2011	
"Girl I Left Behind"	Eddie Butcher	Sings the Titanic	1978	
"Glenshee"	Eddie Butcher	All the Days of His Life	2011	
"Green Grows the Laurel & So Falls the Dew"	Eddie Butcher	All the Days of His Life	2011	
"Green Grows the Laurel & So Does the Rue"	Eddie Butcher	All the Days of His Life	2011	
"Green Veil (The)"	Eddie Butcher	All the Days of His Life	2011	
"Heather Down the Moor"	Eddie Butcher	I Once Was a Daysman	1976	
"Heather Down the Moor"	Paul Brady	The Gathering	1981	
"Hedges of County Down (The)"	Eddie Butcher	Sings the Titanic	1978	
"Hiring Day (The)"	Eddie Butcher	All the Days of His Life	2011	
"Hiring Fair"	Eddie Butcher	I Once Was a Daysman	1976	
"Hiring Fair"	Eddie Butcher	This Label Is Not Removable	2002	
"I Am a Youth That's Inclined to Ramble"	Paul Brady	Welcome Here Kind Stranger	1978	
"I Am a Youth That's Inclined to Ramble"	Cara Dillon	Cara Dillon	2001	
"I Am a Youth That's Inclined to Ramble"	Eddie Butcher	All the Days of His Life	2011	
"I Have a Wee Dog"	Eddie Butcher	All the Days of His Life	2011	
"I Long For to Get Married"	Eddie Butcher	Adam in Paradise	1969	
"I'll Climb up a High High Tree"	Eddie Butcher	All the Days of His Life	2011	
"In Connaught I Was Born"	Eddie Butcher	All the Days of His Life	2011	
"Inniskilling Dragoon (The)"	Eddie Butcher	Adam in Paradise	1969	
"In the County Exeter"	Eddie Butcher	All the Days of His Life	2011	
"It Is Now For New England"	Eddie Butcher	All the Days of His Life	2011	
"I Wish That the War Was O'er"	Eddie Butcher	All the Days of His Life	2011	
"Jacket So Blue (The)"	Eddie Butcher	All the Days of His Life	2011	
"John Gaynor"	Eddie Butcher	All the Days of His Life	2011	
"Johnny & Molly"	Eddie Butcher	All the Days of His Life	2011	
"Katey of Ballinamore"	Eddie Butcher	All the Days of His Life	2011	
"Killyclare" a.k.a. "Carrowclare" a.k.a. "Nights in Carrowclare"	Eddie Butcher	Shamrock, Rose & Thistle	1976	
"Killyclare" a.k.a. "Carrowclare" a.k.a. "Nights in Carrowclare"	Eddie Butcher	Farewell, My Own Dear Native Land	1998	
"Killyclare" a.k.a. "Carrowclare" a.k.a. "Nights in Carrowclare"	Andy Irvine	All in Good Time	1993	
"Killyclare" a.k.a. "Carrowclare" a.k.a. "Nights in Carrowclare"	Andy Irvine	Changing Trains	2008	
"Lanigan's Ball"	Eddie Butcher	All the Days of His Life	2011	
"Laurie Hill" a.k.a. "Laurel Hill"	Eddie Butcher	Sings the Titanic	1978	
"Let Them Come to Ireland"	Eddie Butcher	I Once Was a Daysman	1976	
"Let Them Come to Ireland"	Eddie Butcher	This Label Is Not Removable	2002	
"Lion's Den"	Eddie Butcher	I Once Was a Daysman	1976	
"Longfield Bank (The)" (*)	Eddie Butcher	All the Days of His Life	2011	
"Lovely Bannwater"	Eddie Butcher	Sings the Titanic	1978	
"Lowlands Low (The)" a.k.a. "Young Edmund in the Lowlands Low"	Paul Brady	Welcome Here Kind Stranger	1978	(Note: Paul Brady wrote: "It comes from the singing of Geordie Hanna from the townland of Derrytresk, near Coalisland in east Tyrone.")
"Lowlands Low (The)" a.k.a. "Young Edmund in the Lowlands Low"	Eddie Butcher	All the Days of His Life	2011	
"Magilligan Gaelic Team" (*)	Eddie Butcher	All the Days of His Life	2011	
"Maid of Faughanvale (The)"	Eddie Butcher	All the Days of His Life	2011	
"Man, Woman and Mouse"	Eddie Butcher	Shamrock, Rose & Thistle	1976	
"Marriage (The)"	Eddie Butcher	Sings the Titanic	1978	
"Mary Ackland"	Eddie Butcher	All the Days of His Life	2011	
"Mason's Word (The)"	Eddie Butcher	Shamrock, Rose and Thistle 2	1983	
"Mountain Streams (The)" a.k.a. "Mountain Streams Where the Moorcock Crows"	Eddie Butcher	Shamrock, Rose & Thistle	1976	
"My Aunt Biddy"	Eddie Butcher	All the Days of His Life	2011	
"My Aunt Jane"	Eddie Butcher	All the Days of His Life	2011	
"Myroe Floods (The)" (*)	Eddie Butcher	All the Days of His Life	2011	
"Naming of the Child (The)"	Eddie Butcher	Sings the Titanic	1978	
"Nancy's Whiskey" a.k.a. "The Longford Weaver"	Andy Irvine	Rainy Sundays... Windy Dreams	1980	
"Nancy's Whiskey" a.k.a. "The Longford Weaver"	Eddie Butcher	All the Days of His Life	2011	
"New Mallard Bar (The)" (*)	Eddie Butcher	All the Days of His Life	2011	
"New Tractor (The)" (*)	Eddie Butcher	Sings the Titanic	1978	
"Oh, the Marriage, the Marriage"	Eddie Butcher	All the Days of His Life	2011	
"Our Wedding Day"	Eddie Butcher	All the Days of His Life	2011	
"Paisley Canal (The)"	Eddie Butcher	Sings the Titanic	1978	
"Parochial House (The)"	Eddie Butcher	All the Days of His Life	2011	
"Pat Reilly"	Andy Irvine	The Well Below the Valley	1973	
"Pat Reilly"	Eddie Butcher	Shamrock, Rose and Thistle 3	1983	
"Pisspot (The)"	Eddie Butcher	All the Days of His Life	2011	
"Point Fair (The)" (*)	Eddie Butcher	All the Days of His Life	2011	
"Roe Bridge (The)" (*)	Eddie Butcher	All the Days of His Life	2011	
"Sally & Johnny"	Eddie Butcher	All the Days of His Life	2011	
"Shamrock Shore (The)"	Eddie Butcher	All the Days of His Life	2011	
"Ship's Carpenter's Wife (The)"	Eddie Butcher	Shamrock, Rose & Thistle	1976	
"Shores Of (Sweet) Benone (The)"	Eddie Butcher	I Once Was a Daysman	1976	
"Skewball"	Eddie Butcher	All the Days of His Life	2011	
"Smuggler (The)" (*)	Eddie Butcher	All the Days of His Life	2011	
"T for Tommy"	Eddie Butcher	Sings the Titanic	1978	
"Take Hault o That Man's Hand"	Eddie Butcher	All the Days of His Life	2011	
"Teddy Regan"	Eddie Butcher	Sings the Titanic	1978	
"Thousands Are Sailing"	Eddie Butcher	I Once Was a Daysman	1976	
"Thousands Are Sailing"	Andy Irvine	Parallel Lines	1982	
"Thousands Are Sailing"	Andy Irvine	Words & Music	1983	
"Titanic (The)"	Eddie Butcher	Sings the Titanic	1978	
"To My Son in Amerikay"	Eddie Butcher	I Once Was a Daysman	1976	
"To My Son in Amerikay"	Eddie Butcher	All the Days of His Life	2011	
"To My Son in Amerikay"	Andy Irvine	Live from Patrick Street	1999	
"Tossing the Hay"	Eddie Butcher	Shamrock, Rose & Thistle	1976	
"Tossing the Hay"	Eddie Butcher	Come All My Lads Follow the Plough	1998	
"Until the Morning"	Eddie Butcher	All the Days of His Life	2011	
"Very First Night (The)"	Eddie Butcher	All the Days of His Life	2011	
"Walling of the Men (The)" (*)	Eddie Butcher	All the Days of His Life	2011	
"Weary Gallows (The)"	Eddie Butcher	All the Days of His Life	2011	
"Wee Window"	Eddie Butcher	I Once Was a Daysman	1976	
"Week's Work (The)"	Eddie Butcher	I Once Was a Daysman	1976	
"When the Storm Swept the Countryside"	Eddie Butcher	All the Days of His Life	2011	
"Widow's Daughter (The)"	Eddie Butcher	Folk Ballads from Donegal and Derry	1972	
"Widow's Daughter (The)"	Eddie Butcher	Shamrock, Rose and Thistle 3	1983	
"Wind & the Rain (The)"	Eddie Butcher	All the Days of His Life	2011	
"Youghal Harbour"	Eddie Butcher	Shamrock, Rose & Thistle	1976	

=== List of printed songs ===
- Song title – the title of the song; an asterisk (*) indicates Eddie Butcher wrote the song (this column is sortable)
- Year – the year the song was collected (this column is sortable)
- Book – the title of the book featuring the published song, including score notation (this column is sortable)
- Notes – a reference about the song and/or its publication (this column is not sortable).

Song title	Year	Book	Notes
"Adam in Paradise"	1966	Shamrock, Rose & Thistle	
"Alexander"	1968	Shamrock, Rose & Thistle	
"Ann Jane Thornton"	1969	All the Days of His Life	
"Anglers on the Roe (The)" (*)	1964	All the Days of His Life	
"Another Man's Wedding"	1966	Shamrock, Rose & Thistle	
"Baltimore"	1966	All the Days of His Life	
"Banks of Newfoundland (The)"	1954	Shamrock, Rose & Thistle	
"Banks of the Bann (The)"	1964	Shamrock, Rose & Thistle	
"Barbara Allen"	1966	All the Days of His Life	
"Benevenagh Surrounded in Snow"	1968	All the Days of His Life	
"Bonny Irish Boy (The)"	1970	All the Days of His Life	
"Boyne Water"	1968	All the Days of His Life	
"Brisk Young Butcher (The)"	1966	All the Days of His Life	
"Bureau (The)" (*)	1968	All the Days of His Life	
"Burning of Downhill Castle (The)"	1968	All the Days of His Life	
"Carrowclare" / a.k.a. "Killyclare"	1954	Shamrock, Rose & Thistle	
"Castle Maid (The)"	1975	All the Days of His Life	
"Cock(s) Is/Are Crowing (The)"	1966	Shamrock, Rose & Thistle	
"Come All You Fair Maids"	1975	All the Days of His Life	
"Concrete Mile (The)" (*)	1961	All the Days of His Life	
"Copper John"	1966	Shamrock, Rose & Thistle	
"Cricket Club & Ball (The)"	1975	All the Days of His Life	
"Crockery Ware (The)"	1966	Shamrock, Rose & Thistle	
"Cuckoo's Nest (The)"	1968	All the Days of His Life	
"Dandy Mick McCluskey"	1968	All the Days of His Life	
"David's Flowery Vale"	1966	Shamrock, Rose & Thistle	
"Daysman (The)"	1966	Shamrock, Rose & Thistle	
"Don't Come Again"	1955	Shamrock, Rose & Thistle	
"Down by the Canal"	1968	Shamrock, Rose & Thistle	
"Down the Moor"	1975	All the Days of His Life	
"Drawing Buckets of Water"	1966	All the Days of His Life	
"Drogheda Festival (The)"	1979	All the Days of His Life	
"Easy-Gaan Tom"	1968	All the Days of His Life	
"English Harvest (The)"	1968	All the Days of His Life	
"Fan (The)"	1966	Shamrock, Rose & Thistle	
"Farmer's Daughter (The)"	1966	Shamrock, Rose & Thistle	
"Faughan Side (The)"	1961	Shamrock, Rose & Thistle	
"Finvola, the Gem of the Rose"	1961	Shamrock, Rose & Thistle	
"Flower of Corbymill"	1966	All the Days of His Life	
"Free and Easy to Jog Along"	1961	Shamrock, Rose & Thistle	
"Glenshee"	1968	All the Days of His Life	
"Green Fields of America (The)"	1954	Shamrock, Rose & Thistle	
"Green Grows the Laurel & So Does the Rue"	1966	All the Days of His Life	
"Green Grows the Laurel & So Falls the Dew"	1966	All the Days of His Life	
"Green Veil (The)"	1968	All the Days of His Life	
"Hillman (The)"	1966	Shamrock, Rose & Thistle	
"Hiring Day (The)"	1979	All the Days of His Life	
"I Am a Youth That's Inclined to Ramble"	1979	All the Days of His Life	
"I Have a Wee Dog"	1968	All the Days of His Life	
"I'll Climb up a High High Tree"	1968	All the Days of His Life	
"I Long For to Get Married"	1966	Shamrock, Rose & Thistle	
"In Connaught I Was Reared"	1966	All the Days of His Life	
"In the County Exeter"	1964	All the Days of His Life	
"Inniskilling Dragoon (The)"	1966	Shamrock, Rose & Thistle	
"It is Now for New England"	1969	All the Days of His Life	
"It Was in the Queen's County"	1966	Shamrock, Rose & Thistle	
"I Wish That the War Was O'er"	1966	All the Days of His Life	
"Jacket So Blue (The)"	1968	All the Days of His Life	
"John Gaynor"	1968	All the Days of His Life	
"Johnny & Molly"	1966	All the Days of His Life	
"Journeyman Tailor (The)"	1961	Shamrock, Rose & Thistle	
"Katey of Ballinamore"	1968	All the Days of His Life	
"Lanigan's Ball"	1968	All the Days of His Life	
"Laurel Hill" / a.k.a. "Laurie Hill"	1954	Shamrock, Rose & Thistle	
"Longfield Bank (The)" (*)	1966	All the Days of His Life	
"Lowlands Low (The)" / a.k.a. "Young Edmund in..."	1969	All the Days of His Life	
"Magilligan Gaelic Team" (*)	1961	All the Days of His Life	
"Maid of Faughanvale (The)"	1975	All the Days of His Life	
"Mary Ackland"	1975	All the Days of His Life	
"Mason's Word (The)"	1968	Shamrock, Rose & Thistle	
"Minnie Picken"	1968	Shamrock, Rose & Thistle	
"Mountain Streams Where the Moorcock Crows (The)"	1966	Shamrock, Rose & Thistle	
"My Aunt Biddy"	1970	All the Days of His Life	
"My Aunt Jane"	1966	All the Days of His Life	
"Myroe Floods (The)" (*)	1964	All the Days of His Life	
"Nancy's Whiskey" / a.k.a. "The Longford Weaver"	1966	All the Days of His Life	
"New Mallard Bar (The)" (*)	1969	All the Days of His Life	
"New Tractor (The)" (*)	1961	Shamrock, Rose & Thistle	
"Oh, the Marriage, the Marriage"	1961	All the Days of His Life	
"Our Wedding Day"	1966	All the Days of His Life	
"Parish of Dunhoe (The)"	1966	Shamrock, Rose & Thistle	
"Parochial House (The)"	1979	All the Days of His Life	
"Pat Reilly"	1966	Shamrock, Rose & Thistle	
"Pisspot (The)"	1975	All the Days of His Life	
"Point Fair (The)" (*)	1975	All the Days of His Life	
"Roe Bridge (The)" (*)	1961	All the Days of His Life	
"Sally & Johnny"	1961	All the Days of His Life	
"Saturday Night is Hallowe'en Night"	1968	Shamrock, Rose & Thistle	
"Shamrock Shore (The)"	1968	All the Days of His Life	
"Ship's Carpenter's Wife (The)"	1961	Shamrock, Rose & Thistle	
"Shores of (Sweet) Benone (The)"	1966	Shamrock, Rose & Thistle	
"Skewball"	1979	All the Days of His Life	
"Smuggler (The)" (*)	1969	All the Days of His Life	
"Take Hault o That Man's Hand"	1977	All the Days of His Life	
"Todd's Sweet Rural Shade"	1966	Shamrock, Rose & Thistle	
"To My Son in Amerikay"	1969	All the Days of His Life	
"Tossing the Hay"	1966	Shamrock, Rose & Thistle	
"Trader (The)"	1966	Shamrock, Rose & Thistle	
"True Lovers' Discourse (The)"	1961	Shamrock, Rose & Thistle	
"Until the Morning"	1979	All the Days of His Life	
"Very First Night (The)"	1975	All the Days of His Life	
"Walling of the Men (The)" (*)	1975	All the Days of His Life	
"Weary Gallows (The)"	1979	All the Days of His Life	
"When a Man's in Love"	1966	Shamrock, Rose & Thistle	
"When the Storm Swept the Countryside"	1966	All the Days of His Life	
"Widow's Daughter (The)"	1969	Shamrock, Rose & Thistle	
"Wind & The Rain (The)"	1975	All the Days of His Life	
"Youghal Harbour"	1966	Shamrock, Rose & Thistle	
