= Traditional Irish singing =

Traditional Irish singing is the singing of traditional songs in the native styles such as sean nós. Though some people consider sean nós to particularly refer to singing in the Irish language, the term "traditional singing" is more universally understood to encompass singing in any language, as well as lilting.

Some of the characteristics of traditional Irish songs might be

- Solo singing
- Unaccompanied
- Unamplified
- The audience is focused on the singing

In contrast, Irish ballad singing might be thought of as differing in several respects, even if it is also sometimes referred to as traditional.

- Ballad singing is almost always accompanied by musical instruments.
- It is most often a group activity, not solo singing.
- It is performed typically in public areas, the singing is usually amplified, and the performance might be secondary (e.g., as background music in a pub).

== History ==
The courtly love song genre came to Ireland from Norman France between the 13th and 15th centuries.

== Source singers ==
The term "source singer" is generally understood to describe singers in the past who received their style and repertoire through the oral tradition, whether that be through a family lineage or social circumstance. In the past, many such source singers were deemed so upon "discovery" by field researchers such as Cecil Sharp, Alan Lomax, Hamish Henderson, Pete Seeger, Ewan MacColl, or other song collectors who were prominent in the 1950s and 1960s. Although far from precise, the phrase sometimes was used to draw a distinction with revival singers, whose style and repertoire were perceived as adulterated by contact with written and other second-hand sources. The distinction today in the 21st century is harder to draw.

== See also ==
- List of traditional Irish singers
- Lilting
- Sean-nós singing
- Sean Nós and Sean-nós Activities
- Irish dance
- Folk music
