= Róisín White =

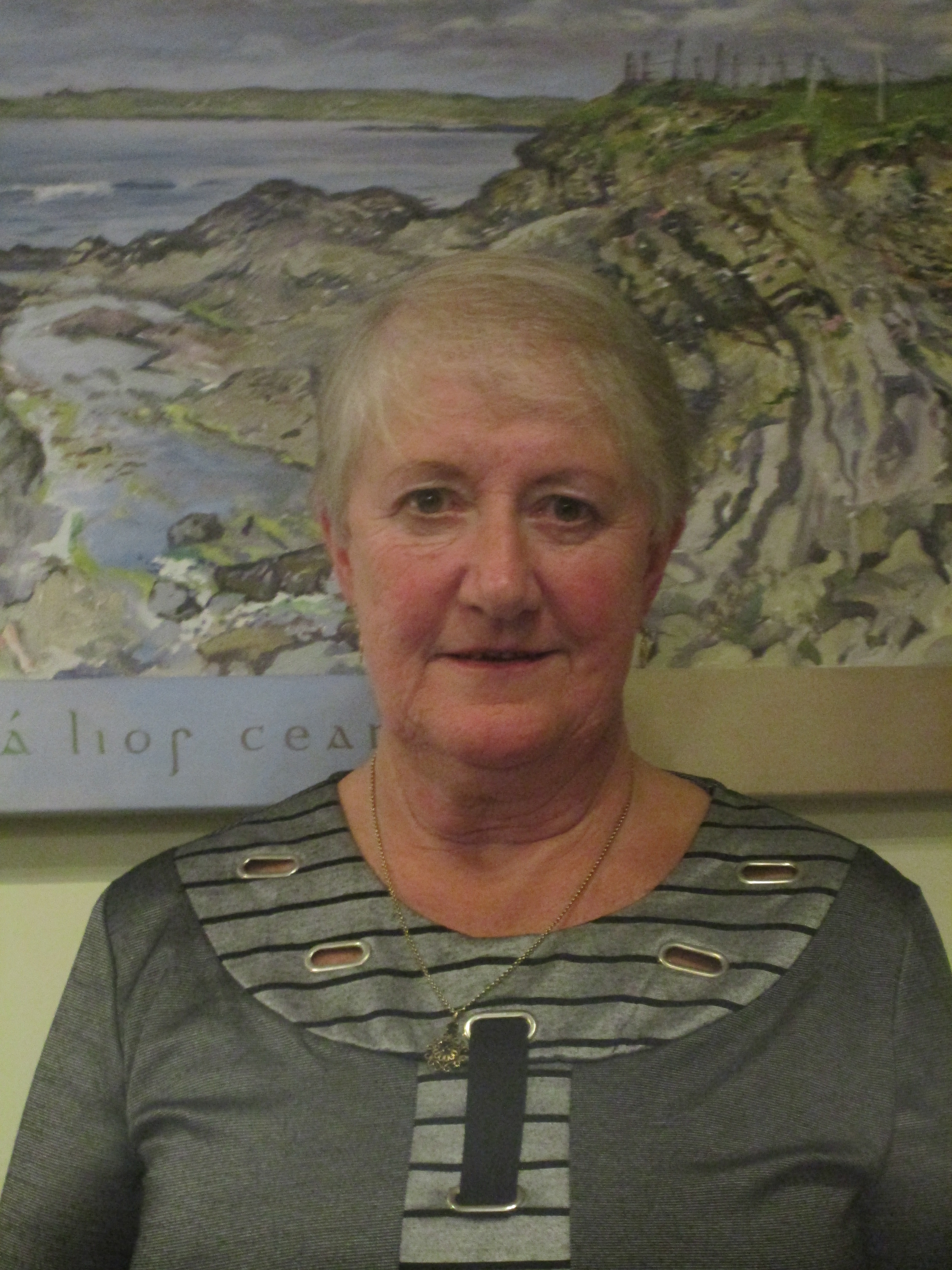

Background information
- Born: 1952 (age 73–74); Kilkeel, Northern Ireland
- Genres: Irish traditional music
- Instruments: singing, concertina
- Years active: 1970–present

Róisín White (born 1952 in Kilkeel) is a Northern Irish singer and concertina-player.

Her mother sang ballads, both locally as on Radio Éireann and this influenced White. She began performing herself after an event in Belleek, County Fermanagh in the 1970s.

White has an extensive repertoire of Ulster songs and sings in both English and Irish. She often sings on folk festivals in Great Britain and Ireland.

White is a retired teacher, former member of the board of the Irish Traditional Music Archive and a former committee member and performer of The Clare Festival of Traditional Singing.

== Awards ==
- 2015: Amhránaí (singer award)

== Albums ==
- The First of My Rambles (2001)
