= Treasa Ní Cheannabháin =

Irish singer and activist

Treasa Ní Cheannabháin (born 1953) is a notable Irish singer in the sean-nós tradition. She was born in Cill Chiaráin in Carna, Conamara, an Irish-speaking area.

In 1996 Treasa and daughter Róisín Elsafty released an album on the French label Musique du Monde label entitled L'art du sean-nós.

== Activism ==
In 2008 she slipped across the Egyptian border into Gaza with her daughter Naisrín Elsafty and a niece in order to distribute €7,700 collected by the Galway-Palestinian Children's Fund. They were arrested and briefly detained, and Treasa's husband had his passport confiscated to prevent him helping Treasa to leave.
