= Róisín Elsafty =

Folk and traditional Irish singer

- Origin: Connemara, Ireland
- Genres: Folk, traditional Irish
- Occupations: Musician, songwriter
- Instrument: Vocals
- Years active: 1996–present

Róisín Elsafty (born in Connemara, Ireland) is a singer in the sean-nós tradition. She is a native speaker of Irish.

She comes from a musical family, being the daughter of Treasa Ní Cheannabháin, one of the most admired singers of the region, and having sisters, including Naisrín Elsafty, who are also performers. Her stepfather, Saber Elsafty, is Egyptian.

== Musical career ==
Róisín made her first recording with her mother in 1996 with L'art du sean-nós for the French label Buda Musique and has appeared on several other albums.

Róisín has performed with Dónal Lunny and accordion player Máirtín O’Connor at the Konzerthaus Großer Saal, Vienna and at the ESB Ceol Festival at the National Concert Hall, Dublin.

She has also performed as part of The Irish Consort with tenor John Elwes, Reiko Ichise on bass viol and Siobhán Armstrong playing the traditional wire-strung Irish harp and the European Renaissance harp.

In 2007 she released Má bhíonn tú liom Bí liom (If you are with me, truly be with me), a CD containing both traditional and new material. This was produced by Dónal Lunny and features, among others, accordionist Máirtín O’Connor, Ronan Browne on several instruments, and harper Siobhán Armstrong. In 2010, she won an IMA award for Best Sean Nós singer.

Róisín and her family have links with the Palestine solidarity movement in Ireland, and she has recorded a song called "An Phailistín" (Palestine) in Irish and Arabic in support of Palestinian civil rights.

== Discography ==
=== Solo albums ===
- 2007 – Má bhíonn tú liom Bí liom

=== Appearances/Collaborations ===
- 2005 – Musique du monde: Irlande – L'art du Sean-Nos (with Treasa Ní Cheannabháin)

== TV ==
- 2005 – Other Voices: Songs from a Room – episode 13, as herself.

== Links ==
- Tour dates for Róisín Elsafty, free music, photographs and videos.
- Róisín Elsafty at IMDb
