= Diarmuid Ó Suilleabháin =

Irish sean nós singer and broadcast journalist

- Born: 12 January 1947; Cúil Aodha, County Cork, Ireland
- Died: 2 December 1991 (aged 44); Dún Chaoin, County Kerry, Ireland

Diarmuid Ó Suilleabháin, also known as "Diarmuidín" was a sean-nós singer and broadcast journalist from Cúil Aodha in the Muskerry Gaeltacht, County Cork, Ireland. He was a broadcaster for Raidió na Gaeltachta.

He died in a car accident in 1991, and a posthumous album of sean nós songs, Bruach na Carraige Báine, was released in 1995.

A music and singing festival, Éigse Dhiarmuid Uí Súilleabháin, was set up in his honour and has been running in the Cúil Aodha and Baile Mhúirne area in the Muskerry Gaeltacht every year since his death.

The festival organising committee, to mark the 30th year of Éigse Dhiarmuid Uí Súilleabháin, in 2022 released a new album of Diarmuidín's songs titled 'Diarmuidín'. The 20 track album features previously released material as well as 7 new tracks that had never before been published.

His singing influenced the sean nós singer Nell Ní Chróinín, who was born in the same area the year of his death.
