= Naisrín Elsafty =

Naisrín Elsafty (born 1989) is an Irish-Egyptian singer and surgeon. She is notable as a distinguished exponent of sean-nós singing, an unaccompanied and heavily ornamented style characteristic of the Irish-speaking area where she grew up.

== Early life and career ==
Naisrín is one of the younger daughters of Treasa Ní Cheannabháin, a native of County Galway and a fine singer in the sean-nós tradition, and Saber Elsafty, an Egyptian doctor. She was raised with her sisters and her twin brother in the Conamara Gaeltacht in the West of Ireland.

Naiseín is the sister of Róisín Elsafty.

Naisrín grew up in a multicultural and multi-religious household, celebrating both Christmas and the Muslim festival of Eid ul-Fitr (the end of Ramadan). Her parents had met while working in Denmark and eventually married in the Conamara parish of Cill Chiaráin.

The children attended local schools and grew up multilingual in Irish, English and Egyptian Arabic.

Naisrín and her family retain links with the Middle East, and in 2008 she and her mother were detained for a time in Gaza after slipping across the border from Egypt while carrying money collected in Ireland for Palestinian families.

Elsafty qualified as a doctor at the Royal College of Surgeons in Ireland in 2012, and works as a specialist registrar in otorhinolaryngology.

== Music ==
Naisrín comes from a family of musicians, and has performed widely in Irish at festivals and gatherings. A number of her performances have been recorded on video and can be accessed via YouTube.

She has not yet released a CD of her own, but does appear on a CD of new and traditional material released by her sister Róisín.
