= Corn Uí Riada =

Irish sean-nós singing competition

Corn Uí Riada is the premier sean-nós singing competition at Oireachtas na Gaeilge, an annually held arts festival of Irish culture. It is named in honour of the composer and founder of the male choir Cór Chúil Aodha, Seán Ó Riada. A 'Cóisir Uí Riada' is held while tuning into the broadcast of Corn Uí Riada, on the internet.

== Past winners ==
- 1972 Treasa Ní Mhiolláin
- 1973 Nan Ghrialais
- 1974 Áine Ní Dhonnacha
- 1975 Joe John Mac An Iomaire
- 1976 Micheál Seoighe
- 1977 Joe John Mac An Iomaire
- 1978 Josie Sheáin Jeaic Mac Donncha
- 1979 Treasa Ní Mhiolláin
- 1980 Tomás Ó Neachtain
- 1981 Tomás Ó Neachtain
- 1982 Josie Sheáin Jeaic Mac Donncha
- 1983 Máirtín Tom Sheáinín Mac Donnacha
- 1984 Sarah Ghriallais
- 1985 Johnny Mháirtín Learaí Mac Donnchadha
- 1986 Máirín Uí Chéide
- 1987 Nora Bn Mhic Dhonnacha
- 1988 Máirtín Tom Sheáinín Mac Donnacha
- 1989 Nora Bn Mhic Dhonnacha
- 1990 Áine Uí Cheallaigh
- 1991 Liam Lillis Ó Laoire
- 1992 Áine Uí Cheallaigh
- 1993 Nora Bn Mhic Dhonnacha
- 1994 Liam Lillis Ó Laoire
- 1995 Mairéad Ní Oistín
- 1996 Gearóidín Bhreathnach
- 1997 Éamon Ó Donnchadha
- 1998 Nan Tom Teaimín de Búrca
- 1999 Celia Uí Bheinéad (Celia Ní Fhátharta)
- 2000 Nan Tom Teaimín de Búrca
- 2001 Meaití Jo Sheamuis Ó Fátharta
- 2002 Bríd Ní Mhaoilchiaráin
- 2003 Éamon Ó Donnchadha
- 2004 Gearóidín Bhreathnach
- 2005 Éamon Ó Donnchadha
- 2006 Stiofán Ó Cualáin
- 2007 Micheál Ó Confhaola
- 2008 Ciarán Ó Con Cheanainn
- 2009 Doimnic Mac Giolla Bhríde
- 2010 Nollaig Ní Laoire
- 2011 Jimmy Ó Ceannabháin
- 2012 Pól Ó Ceannabháin
- 2013 Micheál Ó Confhaola
- 2014 Nell Ní Chróinín
- 2015 Bríd Ní Mhaoilchiaráin
- 2016 Caitlín Ní Chualáin
- 2017 Conchubhar Ó Luasa
- 2018 Máire Ní Chéileachair
- 2019 Máire Ní Choilm
- 2022 Bríd Ní Mhaoilchiaráin
- 2023 Colm Jimmy Ó Curraoin
- 2024 Gearóidín Bhreathnach
- 2025 Micheál Ó Confhaola
- 2026 Rónán Ó Conghaile
