= Derrytresk =

Townland in County Tyrone, Northern Ireland

Coordinates: 54°30′41″N 6°38′40″W

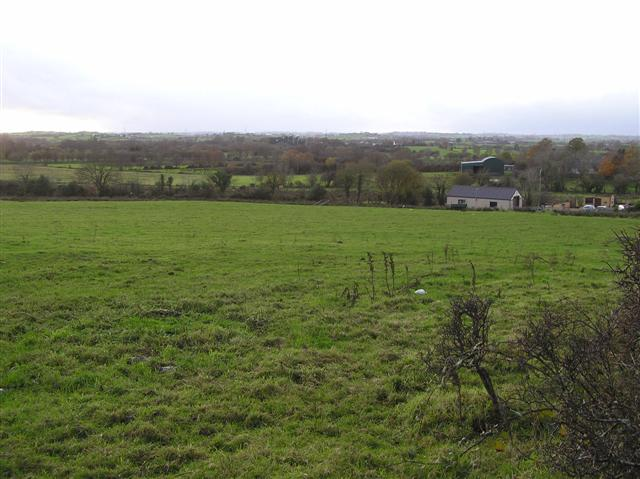
Derrytresk townland in 2006

Derrytresk is a townland outside Coalisland, County Tyrone, Northern Ireland and is close to the shores of Lough Neagh. It is situated in the historic barony of Dungannon Middle and the civil parish of Clonoe and covers an area of 1020 acres. Derrytresk consists of a number of sub-townlands (Derryvarne, Derrykiltena and Derrynahaskila).

The name derives from the Irish: Doire Triosca (Oak wood of the malt grains or grove of the brewer's grains).

== Population ==
The population of the townland declined during the 19th century:

| Year | 1841 | 1851 | 1861 | 1871 | 1881 | 1991 |
|---|---|---|---|---|---|---|
| Population | 523 | 493 | 451 | 445 | 383 | 442 |
| Houses | 81 | 76 | 79 | 83 | 76 | 80 |

== See also ==
- Derrytresk Fir An Chnoic GAC
- List of townlands of County Tyrone
