= Máire Ní Chéileachair =

Traditional Irish singer

- Born: County Cork
- Education: Bachelor's degree
- Alma mater: University College Cork
- Known for: Traditional Irish Singing

Máire Ní Chéileachair is a traditional Irish singer who has won numerous prizes for singing sean-nós.

== Biography ==
From Farran in Cork, Máire Ní Chéileachair was born to parents from Kilnamartyra in the Muskerry Gaeltacht of County Cork. Her father was a teacher. From them Ní Chéileachair got her love of singing and the Irish language. Ní Chéileachair trained as a teacher in University College Cork and worked at Ashton School in Blackrock in Cork. Ní Chéileachair later became a lecturer on sean-nós in UCC. She began singing in public in 1993 and began training to sing. She won an All-Ireland at her first try in 1996. From there, she began to compete in the Oireachtas first in 1997. She won both the Corn Mháire Nic Dhonnchadha and the Sean-nós na mBan competitions. Ní Chéileachair began to compete in the Corn Uí Riada in 2002. She came second in that competition seven times. She finally won in 2018. She was also named TG4 singer of the year in 2018. Success had her begin to teach, first invited to be singer in resident in Muskerry for a year which lead to the sean-nós scheme Aisling Gheal. Ní Chéileachair has two albums to her name and takes part in festivals of music around the world, including the United Kingdom, Germany, France, Canada and the United States.

== Works ==
- Guth ar Fán, 2013
- Ceantar Glas Mhúscraí, 2018
