= Nan Tom Teaimín de Búrca =

Irish traditional sean-nós singer

- Born: Nan Tom Teaimín; Connemara
- Known for: Traditional singing

Nan Tom Teaimín de Búrca is an Irish traditional sean-nós singer.

== Biography ==
Nan Tom Teaimín de Búrca (also given as Nan Tom Taimín) is from Connemara. She moved to London in 1978 but there was no market for her traditional singing there at the time. When de Búrca moved back to Ireland she came to Rusheenamanagh, near Carna, County Galway. Today she teaches sean-nós singing and is a tutor for the masters course in the Irish World Academy of Music and Dance which is part of the University of Limerick. She has won a number of awards for her singing, including the Corn Uí Riada in both 1998 and 2000, the most prestigious annual award for sean-nós singing. She also was awarded the TG4 Singer of the Year award in 2014. She has released six solo albums of traditional Irish music, including folk songs and sean-nós as well as appearing on a number of collections of Irish music including Ireland : The Greatest Songs Ever. She is a regular at festivals including being invited as a guest to the International Voice Festival in Lviv in Ukraine in 2002, where she gave a master class to people from all over the world.

== Albums ==
- Traditional Songs from Connemara
- The Home I Left Behind
- The Banks of the Old Pontchartrain
- Sioscadh na Gaoithe
- Stéibh Eile
- Walking After Midnight
