= Nell Ní Chróinín =

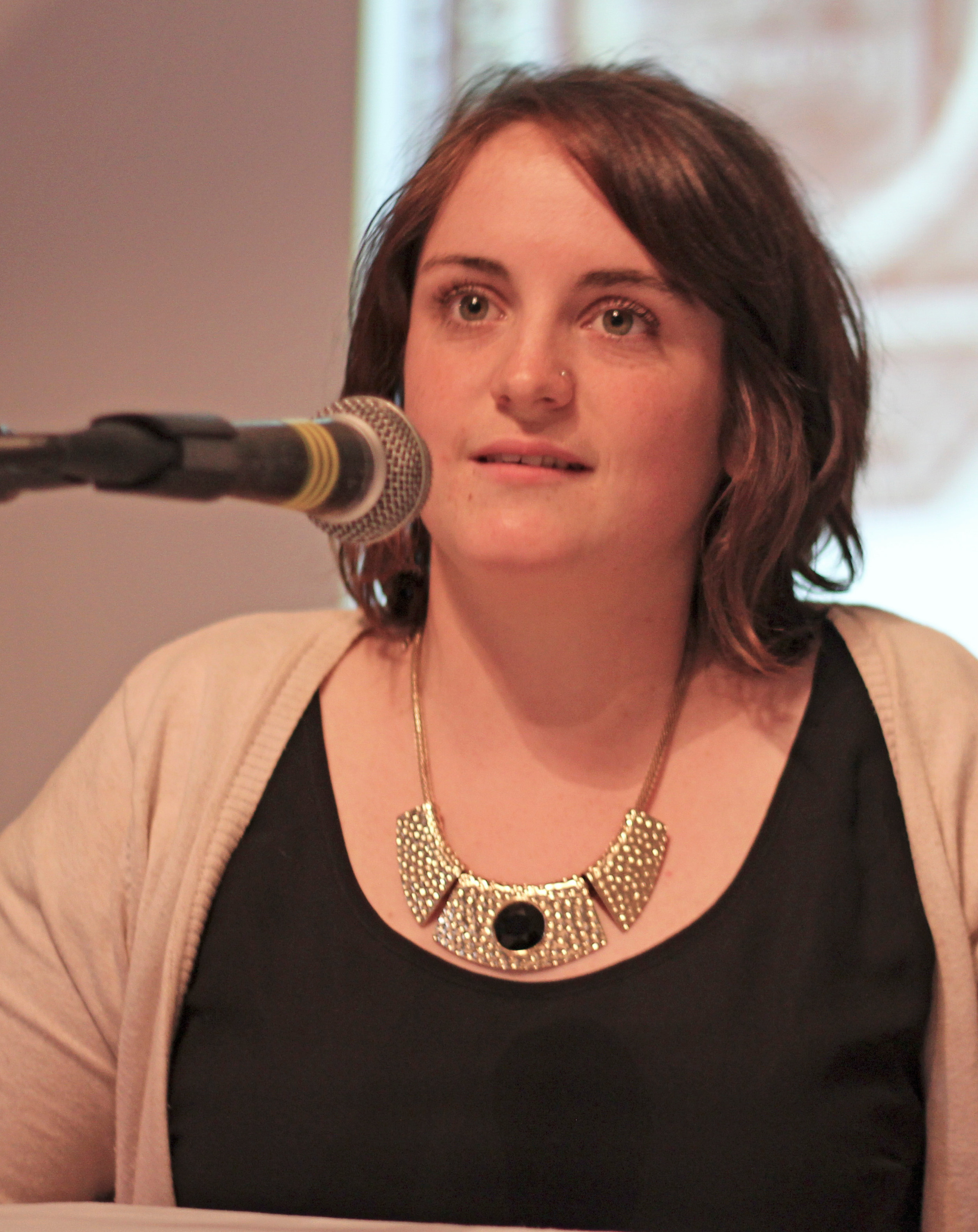
- Ní Chróinín in 2014

Background information
- Born: Nell Ní Chróinín; 1990 (age 35–36); County Cork, Ireland
- Origin: Cork
- Genre: Sean-nós
- Occupations: Singer, teacher.
- Instruments: Vocals, whistle
- Years active: c. 2005–present

Nell Ní Chróinín (IPA: [ˈnʲɛl̠ʲ n̠ʲiː ˈxɾˠoːnʲiːnʲ]; born 1990) is an Irish sean-nós singer from the Muskerry Gaeltacht in County Cork.

== Sean-Nós ==
Ní Chróinín is originally from the Irish townland An Choill Mhór (Cuilmore), from the Irish-speaking town of Béal Átha an Ghaorthaidh, although her family is originally from the nearby village Cúil Aodha Her interest in sean-nós singing arose after attending her first Oireachtas na Gaeilge event when she was ten years old. In her own words, "It was a result of the Oireachtas that I was given a chance to meet with some of the greatest singers, dancers, poets, composers and characters who have now passed on". In the following year, Ní Chróinín started singing lessons, and was particularly influenced by local singers such as Máire Ní Chéilleachair and Eoiní Maidhcí Ó Suilleabháin, from whom she was able to learn her songs. As a teenager, she won prestigious sean-nós singing prizes, in particular winning in her age category at the Fleadh Cheoil na hÉireann in 2005 and 2006.

She was inspired by the Muskerry sean-nós singers Elizabeth Cronin and Diarmuid Ó Suilleabháin.

In 2008, Ní Chróinín won a medal at the Oireachtas na Gaeilge competition, second place amongst the female singers under 35 years of age (the 'Corn Phádraig Mhic an Rí', or 'Corn na mBan'), and she returned in 2010 to win first place in the same category. Having now won the young women's category, she qualified to compete for the primary event of the Oireachtas, the 'Corn Uí Riada' in the following year. She took part as one of eighteen contestants in 2011, singing 'Cath Chéim an Fhia' and 'An Cailín Aerach', although Jimmy Ó Ceannabháin ultimately won the coveted top prize.

In 2014, Ní Chróinín won Corn Uí Riada and was both the youngest person ever to win it and the first person from Seán Ó Riada's home place of Múscraí to win it. The songs with which she won were 'Cuisle mo Chroí' and 'An Chóisire', and she sang 'Na Táilliúirí' upon winning the competition.

Ní Chróinín has performed vocals with and appeared on albums by the Irish traditional band Raw Bar Collective.

In 2017, Ní Chróinín joined the band Danú, and was featured on their album, 'Ten Thousand Miles', released in April 2018.

== TG4 ==
Over the years, Ní Chróinín has made several television appearances as a guest singer, generally on the Irish language television station TG4. She has sung on traditional music shows such as Geanntraí and Anam an Amhrán, and she was also the subject of an episode of Amhráin is Ansa Liom in 2010, a programme where a chosen traditional Irish singer sings and discusses four of their favourite pieces. In Ní Chróinín's case, she chose 'An Lacha Bhacach' (probably the song she is most closely identified with), 'Cath Chéim an Fhia', 'Seán 's a Bhríste Leathair' and 'Táimse agus Máire'.

== Education and work ==
Ní Chróinín studied for her Bachelor of Education at Mary Immaculate College, University of Limerick, and completed her studies in 2010. At the present time, she is working as a teacher in Gaelscoil Eoghain Uí Thuairisc in Carlow.

== Prizes ==
- 2005
  - Fleadh Cheoil na hÉireann – Irish language song (Women) (12–15 years) (1st place)
- 2006
  - Fleadh Cheoil na hÉireann – Irish language song (Women) (15–18 years) (1st place)
- 2008
  - An tOireachtas – Corn Cuimhneacháin Sheáin Óig Uí Thuama (Sean-Nós competition for people under 35 years old) (2nd place)
- 2010
  - An tOireachtas – Corn Cuimhneacháin Sheáin Óig Uí Thuama (Sean-Nós competition for people under 35 years old) (1st place)
  - An tOireachtas – Corn Phádraig Mhic an Rí (Sean-Nós Singing – Women) (1st place)
  - An tOireachtas – 'A special €400 prize for two people who have not won a prize in this competition to this point' (shared with Eibhlís Ní Shúilleabháin)
- 2014
  - An tOireachtas – Corn Uí Riada, premier sean nós singing competition at Oireachtas na Gaeilge

== Discography ==
With Danú

- Ten Thousand Miles (2018)

With Raw Bar Collective

- Millhouse Measures (2011)
- Ag Fogairt An Lae (2016)
