= Sarah Ann O'Neill =

Irish traditional singer

- Born: Sarah Ann Hanna; 19 August 1919; Derrytresk, County Tyrone
- Died: 13 April 2012 (aged 92)

Sarah Ann O'Neill (19 August 1919 –13 April 2012), was a well known and significant Irish traditional singer.

== Biography ==
Sarah Ann O'Neill, sometimes given as Sarah Anne O'Neill, lived in Derrytresk, County Tyrone, where she was born Sarah Ann Hanna on 19 August 1919. She was the eldest child of labourer Joe Hanna and his wife, Elizabeth (née Hughes). There were five boys and four girls who were her full sisters. But her mother had been married before, her first husband Mr Campbell died young, and left her with three sons.

She attended Kingsisland primary school and left school at 14 to begin working. Her first job was in a cafe in Belfast before she went into service as a domestic servant to a wealthy family in her home district. She married local farmer John O’Neill when she was in her 20s.

O'Neill was discovered when song collectors Seán Ó Baoill and Gerry Hicks were sent tapes of an evening of singing in one of the family homes in the 1950s. She was a living repository of traditional ulster songs and the way in which they had been sung. It bore resemblance to sean-nos. O'Neill attended fleadhs and festivals and taught her music to a wide number of singers as well as learning from them. Her first recording was with her brother Geordie in 1974. This made her internationally renowned among traditional musicians. She was given a lifetime achievement award in 2009 from Gradam Ceoil TG4.

O'Neill died on 13 April 2012 and was buried from Clonoe church.
