= Sean nós =

Sean nós refers to 'old style' Irish song and dance:

- Sean-nós singing, Irish traditional song
- Sean-nós dance, Irish traditional dance
  - Sean-nós dance in the United States, Irish traditional singing and dancing in the "old style" in the U.S.
