= 1798 – The First Year of Liberty =

1798 - The First Year of Liberty

Studio album by Frank Harte
- Released: 1998
- Label: Hummingbird

1798 – The First Year of Liberty is an album of traditional Irish songs relating to the 1798 rebellion by the United Irishmen. All songs are sung by Frank Harte and some are accompanied on bouzouki, guitar and occasional bodhrán by Donal Lunny.

The album was released in 1998 to commemorate the bicentenary of the events and is accompanied by a detailed booklet about the rebellion and each of the songs on the album.

'The booklet, as well as containing a concise account of the rising, has biographies of all the leaders of the 1798 rebellion, and a handsome cover illustration. It has a substantial bibliography for those seeking further enlightenment, and it makes a useful complement to the more orthodox histories thereby listed. In fact, it tells us what orthodox histories do not tell us; what those who suffered made of the events of 1798.'

== Track listing ==
1. Henry Joy
2. General Munro
3. Dunlavin Green
4. By Memory Inspired
5. Shan Van Vocht
6. Father Murphy
7. Croppies Lie Down
8. Croppy Boy
9. Ballyshannon Lane
10. Wind That Shakes the Barley
11. Roddy McCorley
12. Bagnal Harvey's Farewell
13. Bold Belfast Shoemaker
14. Wheels of the World
15. Henry Joy McCracken
16. Bodenstown Churchyard
17. Rights of Man
