= Liam Weldon =

- Born: 15 October 1933
- Origin: Dublin, Ireland
- Died: 28 November 1995 (aged 62)
- Genres: Irish folk

Liam Weldon (15 October 1933 - 28 November 1995) was a singer and songwriter in the Irish folk tradition.

== Life ==
Born in Dublin, Ireland, Liam, like many people in inner city Dublin at that time, was moved out of the developing city to Ballyfermot, a suburb on the outskirts of the city.

Liam had a lifelong interest in the songs of the Irish Travellers and his own songs reflected a strong awareness of poverty, disadvantage and exploitation. His personal ballad style had features of other genres, but the precision of intent in his abrasive lyrics was unmistakable.

Six years working in England from the age of sixteen tempered his social awareness, but yet his lyrics often have deep lyric sensitivity. He sang first at the Central Bar in Aungier St., Dublin, and with his wife Nellie ran gigs and clubs through the 1970s.

In Dublin, he organised the Pavees Club in Slatterys on Capel Street and sessions in the Tailor's Hall and the Brazen Head. In the early seventies, Weldon sang and played bodhrán in the group "1691". Named after the year of the signing of the Treaty of Limerick, other members of the group included Tommy Peoples, Tríona Ní Dhomhnaill, Peter Browne, and Matt Molloy, who later went on to form The Bothy Band.

Liam is well known for his songs "Dark Horse on the Wind" and "The Blue Tar Road". "Blue Tar Road" is a criticism of Dublin Corporation in the eviction of Traveller families at Cherry Orchard, County Dublin. "Dark Horse on the Wind", written in 1966 on the 50th anniversary of the Rising, is a lament for the lost dreams of the 1916 Volunteers and a searing indictment of society in post-independence Ireland and, indeed, a prophetic warning of the political troubles which were at that point imminent on the island as a whole.

== Documentary Film ==
In the summer of 2019, film producer Lorraine Kennedy began production of a documentary film about Liam Weldon, recruiting musician and music documentary film-maker Myles O'Reilly (Musician) to direct the project. Dark Horse on the Wind a film about the life and songs of Liam Weldon was completed in January 2022 and opened on 5 March 2022 at the Dublin International Film Festival.

== Discography ==
- Irish Folk Songs (1973, Arfolk) Sixteen Ninety-One
- Dark Horse On The Wind (1976, Mulligan) Liam Weldon
- Elixir (1984, Goasco) Elixir
- Liam Weldon with Pol Huellou (1990, Goasco) Liam Weldon with Pol Huellou
- Shelta (2025) Paddy Keenan, The Pavees And Liam Weldon (recorded 1965-1971)

== See also ==
- Traditional Irish Singers
