= Oireachtas na Gaeilge =

Annual arts festival of Irish culture

Oireachtas na Gaeilge.

Oireachtas na Gaeilge (Irish pronunciation: [ˈɛɾʲəxt̪ˠəsˠ n̪ˠə ˈɡeːlʲɟə], "The Irish (language) Gathering") is an annual arts festival of Irish culture, which has run since the 1890s. Inspired by the Welsh eisteddfodau, the festival has included different events connected with Irish language and culture over the years. Today the festival organisation runs events throughout the year, but the most prominent is Oireachtas na Samhna ("the Samhain gathering") held on the last weekend of October or the first of November, when more than 10,000 people attend the seven-day event.

== History ==
The first Oireachtas na Gaeilge festival was organised in 1897 by Conradh na Gaeilge (the Gaelic League), which envisaged it as part of a renaissance of traditional Irish arts and culture. in the Round Room of Dublin's Rotunda, one of the largest halls in the city at that time. It was just a half-day festival, but the attendance still exceeded a thousand people, an unexpected level of interest.

In contrast to today's festival, there was little emphasis on the performing arts. The competitions included two for poetry, five for prose essays, one for poetry compilations; a competition for unpublished songs or stories in Irish; a competition for new song compositions and a recitation competition.

While the festival management pulled off accomplishments including the staging of the first Irish-language opera, the popularity of the Oireachtas waned in the early part of the twentieth century, and the festival was cancelled for a number of years in the 1920s and 1930s. Since the 1990s, the organisers, under the Directorship of Liam Ó Maolaodha have attempted on to make the festival appealing to younger speakers of Irish via outings, discos, and other youth-oriented events.

The festival was originally held in Dublin, but since the 1970s, it has been held in different cities and towns around Ireland. The festival culminates in four major competitions over the weekend:

- Corn Uí Riada, a sean-nós singing competition for all age and gender categories,
- Comórtas na mBan, a sean-nós singing competition for women
- Comórtas na bhFear, a sean-nós singing competition for men,
- Comórtas Damhsa ar an Sean Nós ("Steip"), a free-style dancing competition

Although the majority of participants in Comórtas Damhsa ar an Sean Nós practice Conamara individual step style now popular around the country, the competition also includes dancing in other regional styles.

Past winners of Corn Uí Riada include Áine Uí Cheallaigh, Lillis Ó Laoire, Máirtín Tom Sheánín Mac Donnchadha, Mícheál Ó Confhaola and 2008 winner Ciarán Ó Con Cheanainn from An Spidéal, County Galway. Colm Jimmy Ó' Curraoin won Corn Uí Riada in 2023.

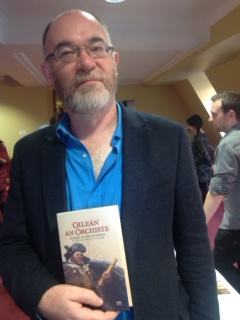
Darach Ó Scolaí at Oireachtas na Gaeilge 2015, with the book Oileán an Órchiste his translation and adaptation of the famous book Treasure Island by Robert Louis Stevenson

=== Book of the Year Awards ===
The Oireachtas' Irish Language Book of the Year Awards are considered the premier literary and publishing awards in the Irish language. Books are shortlisted each year in three categories and one is selected in each to win Gradam Uí Shúilleabháin (Book of the Year for Adults), Gradam Réics Carló (Book of the Year for Children), and Gradam de Bhaldraithe (Book of the Year Translated into Irish from Another Language) awards.

=== Venue ===
Year	Venue	Notes
2025	Belfast	
2022-24	Killarney	
2020	Galway	Cancelled due to the COVID-19 pandemic.
2019	Dublin	
2016–18	Killarney	
2015	Dublin	
2013–14	Killarney	
2012	Letterkenny	
2010–11	Killarney	
2009	Letterkenny	
2008	Cork	
2007	Westport	
2006	Derry	
2005	Cork	
2004	Letterkenny	
2003	Tralee	
2002	Gweedore	
2001	Dingle	
2000	Castlebar	
1999	Dungarvan	
1998	Tralee	
1997	Belfast	
1996	Gweedore	
1995	Dublin	
1994	Dungarvan	
1993	Galway	
1992	Dingle	
1991	Dublin	
1990	Ennis	
1989	Glencolmcille	
1988	Tralee	
1980	Gweedore	
1977	Gweedore	
1974	Cois Fharraige	
1939–1973	Dublin	
1924–1938	no Oireachtas	
1923	Dublin	
1920	Dublin	
1919	Cork	
1917	Waterford	
1915	Dundalk	
1914	Killarney	
1913	Galway	
1897–1912	Dublin	

== Media coverage ==
RTÉ Raidió na Gaeltachta has been covering the bigger Oireachtas events live since 1973 and these broadcasts are in considerable demand from internet audiences around the globe, particularly Corn Uí Riada and the sean-nós stage competitions. Steip, the Sean nós dancing competition, on TG4 has consistently attracted the station's highest annual audience figures. Its success is due to the hard work of Festival administrator Máirín Nic Dhonnchadha who effectively revived the competition from 2000 onwards. In 2008, for the first time, the station broadcast live segments of the Corn Uí Riada competition.

== Sources ==
- Ó Súilleabháin, Donncha (1984). Scéal an Oireachtais 1897 – 1924 (in Irish). Dublin: An Clóchomhar Tta.
- Ní Mhuiríosa, Máirín (1968). Réamhchonraitheoirí (in Irish). Dublin: Clódhanna Teo. ISBN 0-9501264-0-3.
- Mac Aonghusa, Proinsias (Ed.) (1997). Oireachtas na Gaeilge 1897–1997. Dublin: Conradh na Gaeilge.
- Mac Mathúna, Seán (1997). Cuimhní Cinn ar an Oireachtas (in Irish). Dublin: Conradh na Gaeilge.
