= Len Graham (singer) =

- Len Graham singing in Armagh for TG4

Background information
- Born: 20 December 1944 (age 81); County Antrim, Northern Ireland
- Genres: Irish traditional Folk; Celtic music
- Occupations: Singer author
- Years active: 1975–present
- Labels: Gael Linn; Shanachie; Various others
- Website: storyandsong.com

Len Graham (born 20 December 1944) is a Northern Irish traditional singer and song collector from County Antrim, Northern Ireland. He is a leading authority on Folk music in Ireland.

== Early life ==
Graham was born in County Antrim. His father, a fiddler, brought him to sessions in the local area as a young boy. Throughout the 1960s, Len travelled around Ireland to record and preserve folk songs, befriending singers such as Joe Holmes. Graham won the All Ireland Fleadh Cheoil na hÉireann traditional singing competition in 1971, an important accolade for Irish traditional musicians around the world.

== Career ==
In 1975 Graham released his first album, a collaboration with his mentor Joe Holmes, Chaste Muses, Bards and Sages on Free Reed Records. In 1976 he released his first solo album, Wind and Water with Topic Records. This was followed by his second collaboration with Holmes in 1978: After Dawning: Traditional Songs, Ballads and Lilts from the North of Ireland Topic Records, which was also later released on the Ossian USA label.

Graham continued to collaborate with other poets and seanchaithe and storytellers. Since collecting songs from Ulster's older traditional singers, among them Eddie Butcher and Joe Holmes, his association with John Campbell would begin a 20-year collaboration of story and song. During the 1980s–90s, Graham and Campbell would bring their events and work to cross-community groups around Ireland, especially to the north which was experiencing armed conflict. Since John Campbell's passing in 2006, Len has toured regularly with storyteller Jack Lynch.

Graham and Campbell also gave talks on the shared cultural traditions of both the nationalist and unionist populations in Northern Ireland. Graham collaborates with American-born singer Brían Ó hAirt, touring regions of North America annually. Their performances feature the duet singing tradition that was common among the singing communities of Ulster during Graham's own youth; they also feature the repertoire shared between the Ulster and Appalachian/Ozark traditions as well as lilting, sean-nós dancing, spoons playing and tunes on the tin whistle and concertina. Songs collected and recorded by Graham are now well known in folk repertoire around the world, and have been recorded by Altan, De Dannan, The Chieftains, Cherish the Ladies, Andy Irvine and Karen Casey, among others.

His recording career has produced over twenty albums of song. In November 2008, he gave a lecture and performance at the Library of Congress entitled It's of My Rambles: A Journey in the Song Tradition of Ulster. Graham's book, Here I Am Amongst You, on the songs, dance music and traditions of Joe Holmes was published by Four Courts Press in 2010.

== Awards and honours ==
- 1992 – Seán O'Boyle Cultural Traditions Award: "in recognition of his work in Ireland as a song collector and singer."
- 2002 – National Music Award for Traditional Singer of the Year
- 2008 – Keeper of the Tradition Award from the Tommy Makem Festival of Traditional Song
- 2008 – United States' Irish Music Award in the "Sean-Nós Singing" category: "His rich recording history spans over thirty years, with more than twenty albums to his credit"

== Personal life ==
Graham recorded an album of children's songs, called 'When I was Young' with Pádraigín Ní Uallacháin. For many years he lived in Mullaghbawn, County Armagh and is now resident in Newcastle, County Down. He has two sons, Eoghan and Macdara.

== Discography ==
=== With Joe Holmes ===
- Chaste Muses, Bards and Sages (1971)
- After Dawning (1978)

=== Skylark ===
- Skylark (1987)
- All of It (1989)
- Light and Shade (1992)
- Raining Bicycles (1996)

=== With Cathal McConnell ===
- For the Sake of Old Decency (1993)

=== With Pádraigín Ní Uallacháin and Garry Ó Briain ===
- When I Was Young (1996) (children's songs)

=== With John Campbell ===
- Ebb and Flow (1998)
- Two for the Road (2001)

=== With Brian Ó hAirt ===
- In Two Minds (2011)
- The Road Taken (2015)

=== Solo ===
- Wind and Water (1977)
- Do Me Justice (1983)
- Ye Lovers All (1986)
- It's of My Rambles (1993) (field recordings to accompany book by the same name)
- In Full Flight (2008)
- Over the Hills and Far Away (2010)

In 2009 The Knight Templar's Dream from Wind and Water was included in Topic Records 70-year anniversary boxed set Three Score and Ten as track eighteen on the third CD.

== Publications ==
- Graham, Len (2010). Joe Holmes : Here I Am Amongst You. Dublin: Four Courts Press. ISBN 978-1-84682-252-0.
