= Frank Harte =

Irish singer (1933–2005)

Background information
- Born: Frank Harte; 14 May 1933; Chapelizod, County Dublin, Ireland
- Died: 27 June 2005 (aged 72)
- Genres: Irish traditional music, Sean-nós
- Occupations: Architect, lecturer, singer
- Labels: Topic, Hummingbird
- Awards: TG4 Traditional Singer of the Year, 2003

Frank Harte (14 May 1933 – 27 June 2005) was a traditional Irish singer, song collector, architect and lecturer. He was born in Chapelizod, County Dublin, and raised in Dublin. His father, Peter Harte, who had moved from a farming background in Sligo, owned 'The Tap' pub in Chapelizod.

Harte emigrated to the United States for a short period, but returned to Ireland where he worked as an architect, lecturer at the Dublin Institute of Technology in Rathmines, Dublin before concentrating fully on singing and collecting songs.

== Singing ==
Harte's introduction to Irish traditional singing came, he said, from a chance listening to an itinerant who was selling ballad sheets at a fair in Boyle, County Roscommon, sing "The Valley of Knockanure":

"And the banshee cried when Dalton died
In the valley of Knockanure"

This is a far cry from Dublin street songs, but it was the first song I heard, sung by a travelling man, that made me aware that we had a tradition of songs telling about the joys and sorrows, the tragedies and battles of a people in a way that I found irresistible. From that first hearing I have been fascinated by the idea of the story told in song.

— Frank Harte, Songs of Dublin.

Harte became a great exponent of the Dublin street ballad, which he preferred to sing unaccompanied. He was widely known for his distinctive singing, his Dublin accent having a rich nasal quality complementing his often high register. His voice mellowed considerably by the time of his later recordings, allowing for an expressive interpretation of many love songs such as 'Bonny Light Horseman' on the album 'My Name is Napoleon Bonaparte'. This is contrasted sublimely by Frank's cogent interpretation of the popular 'Molly Malone'. He also became more accustomed to singing with accompaniment which is not strictly part of the Irish singing tradition and did not come naturally to him.

Though Irish republican in his politics, he believed that the Irish song tradition need not be a sectarian or nationalist preserve: "The Orange song is just as valid an expression as the Fenian". He believed that songs were a key to understanding the past often saying: "those in power write the history, while those who suffer write the songs, and, given our history, we have an awful lot of songs." Though considered a stalwart of traditional Irish singing and well aware of it, Harte did not consider himself to be a sean-nós singer.

He claimed he liked to sing out of his love for a song rather than a desire to please an audience: "A traditional singer is not singing for a commercial audience so he doesn't have to please an audience." His repertoire included, amongst many others, songs of the 1798 rebellion, Napoleonic ballads and the street ballads of Zozimus. As well as traditional songs, he also sang numerous music hall songs such 'The Charladies' Ball' and 'Biddy Mulligan' as popularised by Jimmy O'Dea.

Harte won the All-Ireland Fleadh Cheoil singing competition on a number of occasions and in 2003, he received the Traditional Singer of the Year award from the Irish-language television channel TG4.

== Song collecting ==
Harte began collecting early in life and he remembered buying ballads from a man who sold them by the sheet at the side of the Adelphi Cinema and by the end of his life had assembled a database of over 15,500 recordings.

As a young man, Harte encountered many songs in his father's pub, 'The Tap', in Chapelizod saying:

It was a great mixture of people in Chapelizod – Catholics and Protestants. There was also a fair few of the old crowd knocking around – the Dublin Fusiliers who had come back from the First World War and they all had their input too. They had these songs about soldiers going away to war and leaving the sweetheart behind and they were all tearjerkers. I would also hear a lot of the old music-hall songs and Victorian melodrama songs such as She Was Only a Bird in a Gilded Cage or ... things that would tear your heart out, bring tears to your eyes.

— Frank Harte, Interview with Frank Harte by John Kelly.

He once wrote about his song collecting:

I have been gathering songs around the country for a good number of years now, and seldom have I come across singers who are unwilling to part with their songs. Probably they realise as I do, that the songs do not belong to them, just as they did not belong to the people they got them from.

— Frank Harte, Songs of Dublin.

This was a philosophy that Frank went on to espouse greatly himself, having given countless songs and encouragement to singers in Ireland and abroad for over fifty years. Recipients of songs and information about them include Christy Moore, Andy Irvine, Karan Casey, The Voice Squad, and musicians alike.

Despite his extensive collecting, he firmly believed that songs only existed when sung and to augment the point, he often quoted the poem "Living Ghosts" by Brendan Kennelly:

"All songs are living ghosts
And long for a living voice"

Harte is mentioned as a source of songs by members of Planxty:

"The Little Drummer" was a song passed on by the late, great Dublin singer and collector, Frank Harte. "He is perhaps the single most important collector of songs.

— Christy Moore, The Humours of Planxty by Leagues O'Toole.

I remember Christy and myself going up to Frank Harte for songs. I'd known Frank since very early in my career. He was an architect living in Chapelizod and I first met him in about 1963. He was always slightly to one side. It would be Johnny Moynihan and myself and our clique, and Ronnie Drew and The Dubliners, all more or less of the same age, and Frank was probably seven or eight years older than I was. I liked him a lot.

— Andy Irvine, The Humours of Planxty by Leagues O'Toole.

== Recordings ==
Harte recorded several albums and made numerous television and radio appearances, most notably the Singing Voices series he wrote and presented for RTÉ Radio, which was produced by Peter Browne in 1987. Harte's first two LPs, though released with six years between them, were recorded in one session in England by Bill Leader with concertina accompaniment on some songs by Alf Edwards. From 1998 he recorded four albums for the Hummingbird record label on which he was accompanied by Dónal Lunny on bouzouki and guitar. These last four albums covered the huge topics of the 1798 Rebellion, the Great Irish Famine, Napoleon Bonaparte and the Irish navvies abroad. Each album is characteristically accompanied by comprehensive liner notes of meticulous research into each song and the subject in question, though his accuracy and impartiality as a historian is not as unanimously praised as his singing. In 2004, Harte's first two albums were re-released on CD, though the first track of his first album 'Traveller All Over The World' was omitted.

== Performance ==
Harte was a regular at the Sunday morning sessions at The Brazen Head pub, along with the late Liam Weldon who ran the session. He was also a supporter of An Góilín Traditional Singer's Club. A regular at singers' sessions in Ireland, he appeared at clubs, seminars and festivals in France, Britain and America as well as touring the festivals at Fleadhanna in Ireland. Harte also performed in London in Ewan MacColl and Peggy Seeger's 'Singers Club' in 1971 and at the on two occasions.

Harte felt that the traditional singer, unlike the latter type of vocalist, had absolutely no responsibility to entertain or please the crowd that might be listening, because the singer's real purpose is simply to perform the song, the act of the performance being a justification in itself.

He appeared at many American festivals including The Blarney Star in New York, Gaelic Roots in Boston College, The Catskills Irish Arts Week, The Greater Washington Ceili Club Festival in Maryland and Irish Fest in Milwaukee and for seventeen years he was a veritable staple at the Irish Week every July in the Augusta Heritage Festival in Elkins in the Appalachian mountains of West Virginia where he often performed with Mick Moloney. He was also in demand as a teacher and gave many talks about traditional song including a lecture entitled "My name is Napoleon Bonaparte – the significance of Napoleon Bonaparte in the Irish Song Tradition" at the Willy Clancy Summer school on 12 July 2001.

== Legacy ==
Harte died of a heart attack, aged 72, on 27 June 2005 and is survived by his wife Stella (née Maguire), daughters, Sinead and Orla, his sons Darragh and Cian, and his 6 grandchildren. His influence is still evident in singers such as Karan Casey. Frank continues to be remembered fondly in sessions and folk clubs on both sides of the Irish sea.

At the 2005 Whitby Folk Week a tribute to Frank Harte entitled "Through Streets Broad and Narrow" was held at the Resolution Hotel Function Room, on Monday 22 August 2005 at 6:00pm. It featured Ken Hall and Peta Webb, Jim McFarland, Niamh Parsons, Jerry O'Reilly, Jim Mageean, George Unthank, Alan Fitzsimons, Pete Wood, Grace Toland, Brian Doyle, Patricia Flynn, Geordie McIntyre and Alison McMorland, The Wilsons, Eamonn O'Broithe, Roisin White, Bruce Scott, Rosie Stewart and others.

In September 2006, the first Frank Harte Festival was organised and held in Dublin by Jerry O'Reilly and other members of An Góilín Traditional Singer's Club. The second and third festivals were held in September 2007 and 2008, again organised by An Góilín, and the festival has continued as an annual event taking place on the last weekend of September each year. As part of the festival, a walk takes place around an area of Dublin associated with Frank's songs. In 2011 it was in Glasnevin cemetery. In 2012 it was based on central Dublin, around Trinity College.

Singer-songwriter Robbie O'Connell wrote a song "The Keeper of the Songs" in memory of Harte.

In May 2008, the third Frank Harte Memorial Prize was given at the Dublin Institute of Technology, Bolton Street, in association with the DIT faculty of the built environment, RTÉ, and the Teachers' Union of Ireland. The prize is awarded to students in their second year of their studies in Construction Technology and Design.

== Discography ==
=== Solo albums ===
- Dublin Street Songs (Topic, 1967)
- Through Dublin City (Topic, 1973)
- And Listen to My Song (Mulligan/Ram, 1978)
- Daybreak and a Candle-End (Faetain, 1987)
- 1798 - The First Year of Liberty (Hummingbird, 1998)
- My Name Is Napoleon Bonaparte: Traditional Songs on Napoleon Bonaparte (Hummingbird, 2001)
- The Hungry Voice: The Song Legacy of Ireland's Great Hunger (Hummingbird, 2004)
- Dublin Street Songs / Through Dublin City (Hummingbird, 2004) – first two albums reissued on combined CD
- There's Gangs of Them Digging: Songs of Irish Labour (Hummingbird, 2007)
- When Adam Was in Paradise, Traditional Songs of Love and Courtship (Hummingbird, 2016)

=== Compilations ===
- Top of the Morning (Pickwick, 1979) – includes Harte's "Biddy Mulligan"
- Irish Folk Favourites (Harp/Pickwick, 1990) – includes Harte's "Dicey Reilly"
- Irish Voices (Topic, 1996) – includes Harte's "The Traveller All Over the World"
- Irish Songs From Old New England (Folk Legacy, 2003) – includes Harte's "Napoleon's Defeat"
- Three Score and Ten (Topic, 2009) – includes Harte's "He Rolled her to the Wall"

== Bibliography ==
- Harte, Frank (1978). Songs of Dublin. Dublin: Gilbert Dalton. ISBN 978-0-86233-013-2.
- Harte, Frank (2020). A Living Voice, The Frank Harte Song Collection: Craft Recordings, Dublin. ISBN 9780955311215

== Broadcast ==
- Singing Voices, five-part series for RTÉ Radio 1 first broadcast in May 1987 each on a different aspect of the Irish singing tradition.
- Appearance on Come West Along the Road series one singing "Napoleon Bonaparte" originally from the RTÉ series Fonn
- Main subject of the television documentary Sé Mo Laoch – Frank Harte for TG4, directed by Philip King
- Main subject of the memorial radio documentary And Listen to my Song by Peter Browne for RTÉ Radio. Listen to it here.
- Main subject of a radio documentary called Frank Harte Remembered by Mick Moloney on RTÉ Radio a year after his death. Listen to it here.

== See also ==
- List of Irish music collectors

== Obituaries ==
- O'Reilly, Jerry: "Frank Harte (1933–2005)", in: Folk Music Journal vol. 9, no. 3 (2008), pp. 479–80.
- Ní Fhloinn, Bairbre: "In Memoriam. Frank Harte – Singer and Song-Collector 1933–2005", in: Béaloideas vol. 74 (2006), pp. 236–8.
