= Irish Traditional Music Archive =

The Irish Traditional Music Archive (or ITMA; Irish: Taisce Cheol Dúchais Éireann), operating as a charity, is a "national reference archive and resource centre for the traditional song, instrumental music and dance of Ireland". Focusing on Irish traditional music, Irish dance and their history, the archive covers the performance traditions of the island of Ireland, within the Irish diaspora, and other performers of Irish traditional music globally.

The archive, described by some sources as the "largest collection of its kind in the world", contains thousands of sound recordings, as well as books and serials, photographs, sheet music, DVDs, posters and catalogues. Founded with the Breandán Breathnach Collection, the collection has been expanded through donations by radio, television, libraries and private collectors.

Founded in 1987, the archive has been housed in a Georgian house in central Dublin since 2006.

== History ==
ITMA was co-founded in 1987 by Nicholas Carolan and Harry Bradshaw. Nicholas Carolan, who first found a space for the archive in the Temple Bar area of Dublin, served as director for 28 years until he was succeeded by Grace Toland in 2015. Carolan continued in a voluntary role as director emeritus.

The organisation receives some funding from the Arts Council of Ireland.

== Publications ==
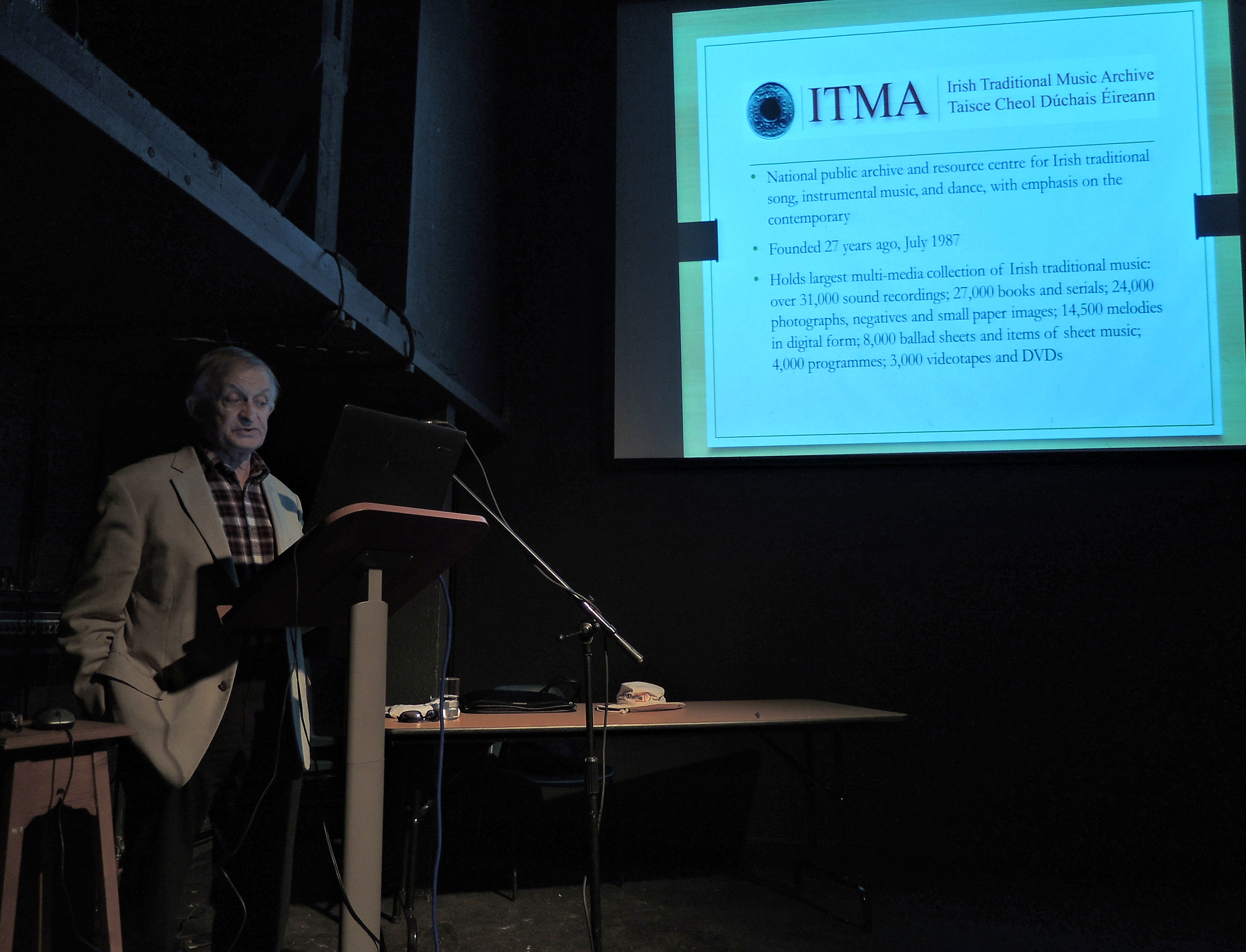
Nicholas Carolan, Director Emeritus, holding a lecture at the "Craiceann Bodhrán Festival" 2014

The archive has published two major printed publications deriving from historical manuscript collections of Irish traditional music: Tunes of the Munster Pipers: Irish Traditional Music from the James Goodman Manuscripts, 500 pre-Famine melodies edited by Dr Hugh Shields from a Trinity College Dublin collection; and The Irish Music Manuscripts of Edward Bunting (1773–1843): An Introduction and Catalogue by Dr Colette Moloney, a guide to 1,000 18th- and early 19th-century melodies and 500 song texts held in Queen's University Belfast. The archive began a programme of publishing historical and archival sound recordings with the release of the EP-CD Adam in Paradise by the singer Eddie Butcher (in conjunction with the Ulster Folk & Transport Museum). In 2011, ITMA released a biography of Butcher, with 67 previously unpublished songs and an accompanying boxset of three CDs.

== Broadcasting ==
The archive has cooperated with RTÉ Radio and RTÉ Television on several projects. In one such project, some of the archives of Irish traditional music of RTÉ Radio, dating back to the 1940s, were remastered, copied and catalogued for public access in the archive. In a television project, archive staff researched the traditional music holdings of the early decades of RTÉ Television (1961–1991) and other television and film archives such as those of Ulster Television in Belfast.

== See also ==
- Music of Ireland
