= Sean-nós singing =

Music genre

- Etymology: 'old-style' in the Irish language
- Stylistic origins: Unknown, 13th century or earlier
- Cultural origins: Ireland
- Typical instruments: A cappella

Sean-nós singing (/ˈʃæn.noʊs/ SHAN-nohss, Irish: [ˈʃan̪ˠ n̪ˠoːsˠ]; Irish for 'old style') is unaccompanied, traditional Irish vocal music usually performed in the Irish language. Sean-nós singing usually involves very long melodic phrases with highly ornamented and melismatic melodic lines, differing greatly from traditional folk singing elsewhere in Ireland, although there is significant regional variation. Sean-nós songs cover a range of genres, from love song to lament to lullaby, traditionally with a strong focus on conveying the relevant emotion of the given song. The term sean-nós, which simply means '[in the] old way', is a vague term that can also refer to various other traditional activities, musical and non-musical.

The musician and academic Tomás Ó Canainn said:

... no aspect of Irish music can be fully understood without a deep appreciation of sean-nós singing. It is the key which opens every lock.

The origins of sean-nós singing are unknown, but it is probably at least seven centuries old.

== History ==
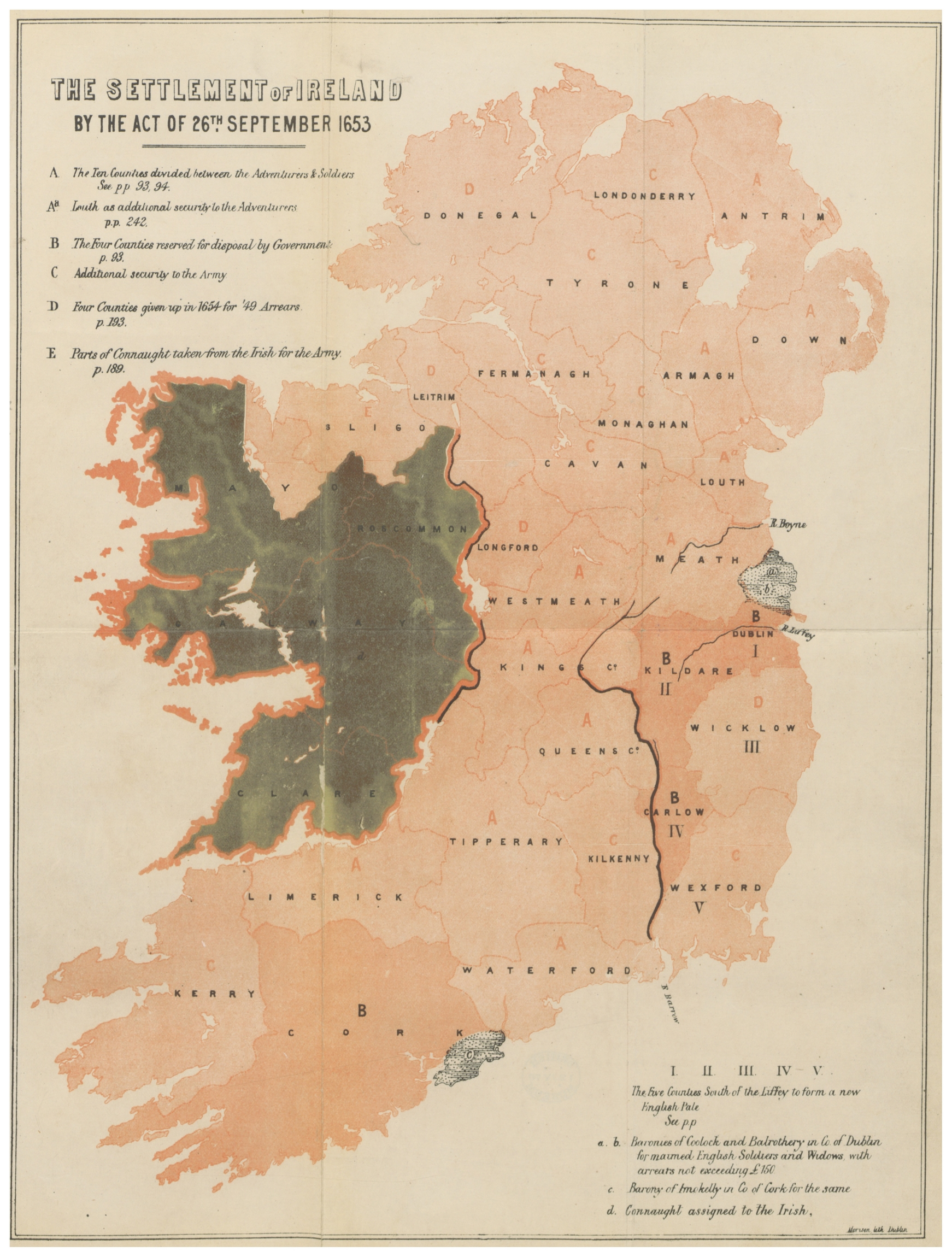
Banishment of Irish Catholics to Connacht, 1653

There is almost no mention of sean-nós songs in medieval Irish literature, but experts have speculated that sean-nós singing has existed in a similar form since the thirteenth century. Many of the songs sung today can be traced back to the 16th century.

In early Irish history, poets and bards had distinctly separate social roles from musicians. However, the Tudor and Cromwellian conquests of Ireland led to a suppression of traditional Irish culture, and the 1662 Act of Settlement, which banished Irish Catholic landowners to Connacht, meant that the remains of these once complex social and regional styles combined. The once lowly bard became the nonprofessional composer of "street poetry" (sráid éigse), and the strict meters of older, professionally composed, Irish ballads were replaced with the far more accessible amhrán ("song") meters.

The tradition of the sean-nós song was exclusively oral and remains customarily so, however, a few songs were known to have been conveyed to script as early as the 16th century. A songbook for Elizabeth I contained English interpretations of sean-nós songs. Songs started to be more extensively written down in the eighteenth century and distributed in print from then on.

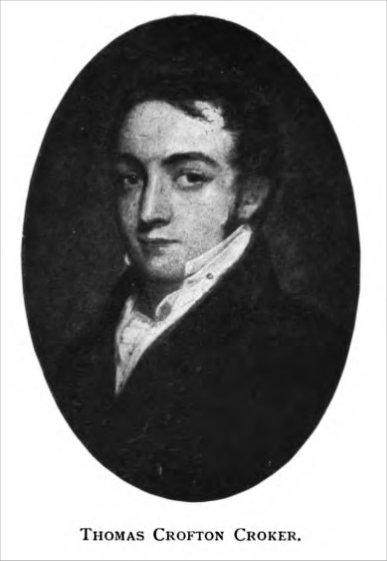
Thomas Crofton Croker

The Irish antiquarian Thomas Crofton Croker described an elderly female sean-nós singer he encountered in the early 1800s known for her "skill in keening":

This woman, whose name was Harrington, led a wandering kind of life, travelling from cottage to cottage about the country, and though in fact subsisting on charity, found everywhere not merely a welcome, but had numerous invitations on account of the vast store of Irish verses she had collected and could repeat. Her memory was indeed extraordinary; and the clearness, quickness, and elegance with which she translated from the Irish into English, though unable to read or write, is almost incredible. Before she commenced repeating, she mumbled for a short time, probably the beginning of each stanza, to assure herself of the arrangement, with her eyes closed, rocking her body backwards and forward, as if keeping time to the measure of the verse, She then began in a kind of whining recitation, but as she proceeded, and as the composition required it, her voice assumed a variety of deep and fine tones, and the energy with which many passages were delivered, proved her perfect comprehension and strong feeling of the subject.

The first recordings of sean-nós singing were made in 1905 by Richard Henebry (Risteard De Hindeberg) in An Rinn (Ring) and Cill Ghobnait (Kilgobnet), County Waterford, all of which have been digitised and made available online via the Irish Traditional Music Archive website. In 1907, the Austrian ethnologist Rudolf Trebitsch made several recordings in Counties Waterford, Kerry, Donegal as well as Dublin. Later in the twentieth century, particularly during the folk revival, some sean-nós singers gained popularity in international folk music circles. The most notable of these was the Connemara singer Seosamh Ó hÉanaí (Joe Heaney), who toured America, performing at the Newport Folk Festival in 1965 before then settling in New York City. Others, including Bess Cronin of West Cork, were visited and recorded by song collectors and their recordings inspired future generations of musicians.

The term "sean-nós" ("old style") to describe traditional Irish language singing began in the early 1940s at the Gaelic League Oireachtas as part of the Gaelic Revival in an attempt to distinguish the genre from "less authentic" styles of music.

== Musical features ==
Sean-nós singing is defined by Tomás Ó Canainn as:

... a rather complex way of singing in Irish, confined mainly to some areas in the west and south of the country. It is unaccompanied and has a highly ornamented melodic line....Not all areas have the same type of ornamentation—one finds a very florid line in Connacht, contrasting with a somewhat less decorated one in the south, and, by comparison, a stark simplicity in the northern songs ...

Alternatively, the term simply refers to "the old, traditional style of singing" and encompasses non-ornamented regional styles. According to Hiúdaí Ó Duibheannaigh, who served on the Irish Folklore Commission from 1936 to 1939, "...people... think it's a particular style of singing: it's not!" It is largely accepted that what constitutes sean-nós singing cannot be defined in any precise way.

=== Ornamentation of melody ===
Many styles of sean-nós involve highly ornamented and melismatic singing where the voice is placed near the top of the range. Ó Canainn identifies most ornamentation as melismatic, with ornaments replacing or emphasising notes, rather than serving as passing notes between existing notes. Ornamentation usually occurs on unstressed syllables. Decorative elements common in sean-nós singing fulfill aesthetic purposes to connect the text to the singer's interpretation of the melody and to enhance a sense of continuity by filling the gaps between phrases. The melody is often varied verse-to-verse, embellished it in unique and personal ways, with individual singers often have a particular style of doing so. Women are more likely to use brief pauses initiated by glottal stops, "slides" or glissandi. Sometimes, a song is ended by speaking the finishing line instead of singing it.

Tomás Ó Canainn observed:

Ornamentation gives the movement between main notes a logicality and inevitability which it would not otherwise have: it smooths the musical texture and, while indispensable, its overall effect should be so subtle.

=== Lack of vibrato ===
Sean-nós singers virtually never use vibrato, and the idea of resonance does not apply to sean-nós music; a thin tone is perfectly acceptable.

=== Nasal quality ===
Many sean-nós singers sing in a nasal tone that is not present in general speech. This nasal tone may have originated as an attempt to reproduce the sound of the uilleann pipes, or to aid in the implementation of melodic ornaments. Seosamh Ó hÉanaí (Joe Heaney) said the nasal effect, which some refer to by the onomatopoeic term neá, provided a quiet drone in his head to keep him on pitch and represented "the sound of a thousand Irish pipers all through history". Heaney claimed to hear the drone at all times, and said that every good sean-nós singer, as well as traditional Native American and East Indian singers, "had the neá". Some singers, including Heaney, sometimes hum the neá very briefly at the start of the song.

=== Modality ===
Sean-nós songs use Ionian, Dorian, Mixolydian and Aeolian modes, and scales are hexatonic and pentatonic, indicating that the style is a survival from prior to the standardisation of temperament and key.

=== Free rhythm and phrasing ===
Sean-nós songs are usually performed with rhythmic freedom, with words and phrases extended at the discretion of the singer. The songs are regulated instead by a "pulse" (cuisle) that corresponds to the poetic meter of the song. Sean-nós singers tend to use very long extended phrases, particularly in sad songs, with a tendency to draw breath after a conjunction or linking words rather than at the end of a phrase.

=== A cappella ===
Sean-nós singing seems to always have been performed without accompaniment, as added instruments would restrict the freedom of the singer to vary ornaments and rhythm.

== Regional variation ==
There are three main styles of sean-nós, corresponding to the three areas where Irish is still spoken as a community language, the Gaeltachtaí of Munster (parts of Kerry, and Cork and Waterford), Connacht (Connemara), and Donegal (Ulster). The differences in style generally correspond geographically to the various dialects of the Irish language. Singers from outside these Gaeltachts, and indeed outside Ireland, may blend the styles depending on where they learned.

Official Gaeltacht regions of Ireland

Each area also has its own repertoire of sean-nós songs, although songs such as "Róisín Dubh" and "Dónal Og" are popular throughout Ireland. While sean-nós singing varies around Ireland, with ease of travel and the influence of recording media, these distinctions have become less definite since at least the early twentieth century; singers sometimes adopt different styles from various parts of the country. Furthermore, due to the "free" nature of sean-nós, features such as ornamentation can vary person-to-person more than place-to-place.

The Connacht / Connemara style is highly ornamented. It is certainly the most widely recognised regional style, to the extent that other styles are often forgotten. The most famous performer of Connemara style sean-nós is Seosamh Ó hÉanaí (Joe Heaney). Connemara singers would often take care to decorate each individual word. Sean-nós songs in Connemara often involve the sea, with fishing disasters being a common theme.

The Munster style is also highly ornamented, but unlike the Connemara style, the gap between notes within ornaments can be wide.

The Ulster / Donegal style has a more open, less nasal vocal tone than southern styles, and a higher pitch. Donegal sean-nós has a more consistent pulse and it is much less ornamented, which can make it stand out from other regional styles; these features seem to have come from Scottish Gaelic singing. Cow herding songs are popular in Donegal; it has been theorised that these came from around County Londonderry, which has more fertile land. Donegal songs also use the English language more often than in other regions, which may be due to contact with Scottish people and their bothy ballads.

== Lyrics and genre ==
Many of the songs typically sung sean-nós could be seen as forms of love poetry, laments, or references to historical events such as political rebellions or times of famine, lullabies, nature poetry, devotional songs, or combinations of these. Comic songs are also part of the tradition (e.g., An Spailpín Fánach, Cúnla, Bean Pháidín), as are songs about drinking (An Bonnan Buí, Preab san Ól, Ólaim Puins is Ólaim Tae). In general, comic, bawdy, drinking, and dancing songs are usually sung at a fast tempo and with a strict metre, whereas serious songs are free-metred and slow.

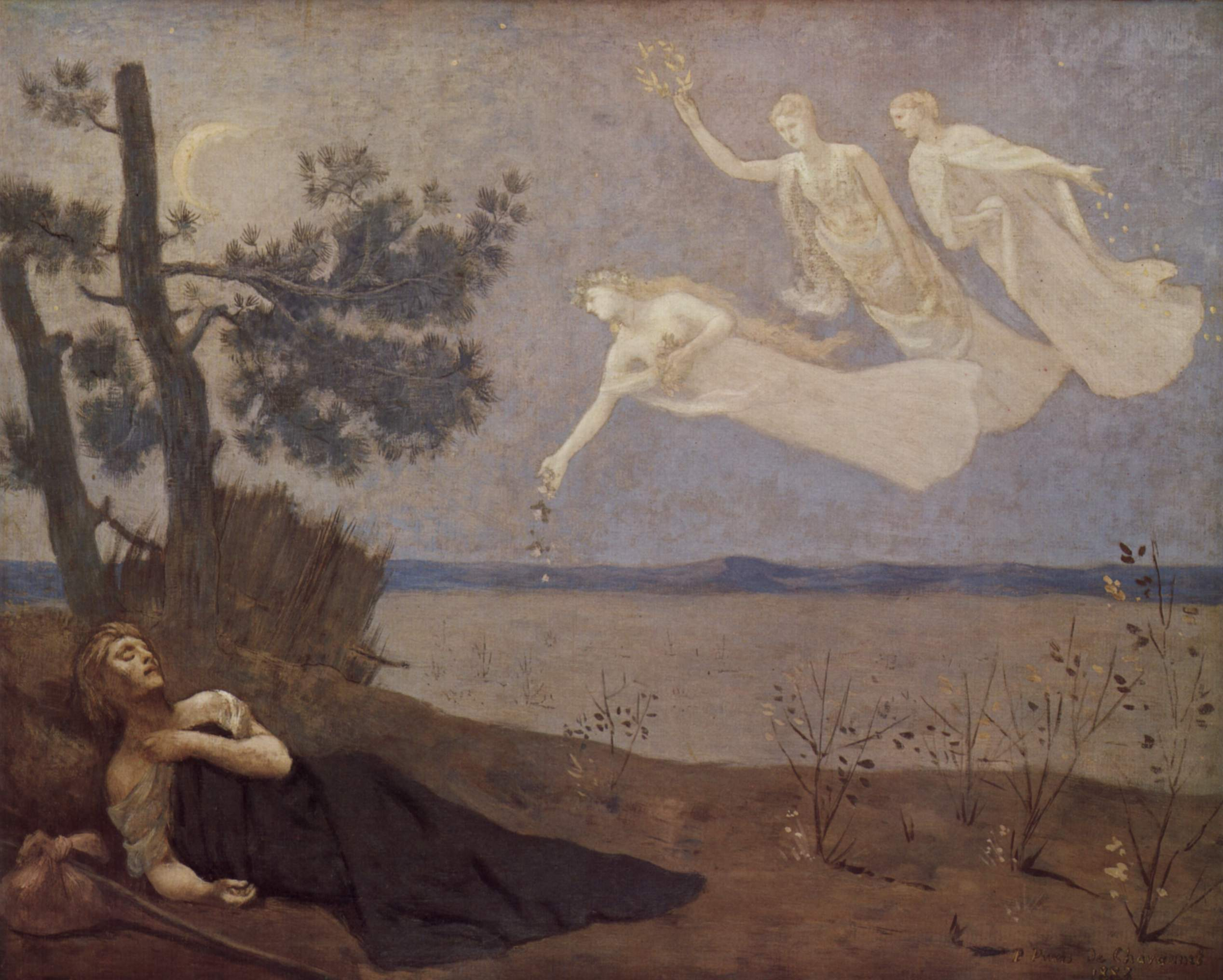
An Aisling, Pierre-Cécile Puvis de Chavannes (1883)

The aisling, or "vision poem", may be the oldest type of sean-nós song.

Keening songs, traditional songs of lament for the dead in the Gaelic Celtic tradition, are a form of sean-nós song in Ireland.

Songs with a detailed narrative, such as murder ballads, are far more common in traditional English language music than sean-nós songs. Themes frequently found in Gaelic music include the great beauty and spiritual qualities of nature and laments for lost loved ones, the latter being nearly always sung from the female perspective.

The performance of most songs is not restricted by gender, although the lyrics may imply a song is from a woman's or man's point of view. There are a few songs that men have a tendency not to sing. Women, however, do not seem to have the same hesitation. The term "sean-nós" is applied to songs in English where the style of singing is characteristic of Irish language sean-nós singing, although some traditionalists believe that songs must have some Irish lyrics to belong to the tradition. A number of traditional sean-nós songs are macaronic, combining two or more languages, such as Siúil a Rún, the popular version of which was taken from Elizabeth Cronin, who sang in Irish and English. Paddy Tunney, who sang English language songs in the sean-nós style, emphasised:

The traditional style of singing in English is just as much sean-nós as in Gaelic ... traditional singing is all sean-nós.

Many of the English language songs sung in sean-nós style are those found on broadsides, including the famous Child Ballads.

== Social function and context ==
=== Purpose ===
Sean-nós songs were written to express emotions, including the love and sadness of daily existence and the loss of family and friends by death or emigration, but also in order to record significant events. The very interaction between the performer and audience is a crucial aspect of the sean-nós tradition. The emotions of any given song are arguably more important than the narrative, but they are usually conveyed in a sensitive way, rather than being melodramatic.

=== Setting ===
Like other types of folk song, sean-nós songs accompanied work inside and outside the home. However, they were also performed at organised meetings, such as Cèilidhs, particularly in the winter months. The participants may gather round a fire, singing one by one in a circle; those who do not sing may tell a story, riddle, or some local gossip.

=== Audience interaction ===
The singer may stay seated among the audience, facing forward without focusing on any person or object. They may occasionally adopt a position facing the corner of the room and away from the audience, with eyes closed, a position that has acoustic benefits, aids concentration for performing long intricate songs from memory, and perhaps has some additional ancient significance.

The listeners are not expected to be silent throughout and may participate in the performance through words of encouragement and commentary. At any point in the performance, particularly at emotional moments – a listener may interject with expressions such as Maith thú! (good for you), Dia go deo leat! (God be with you always). Sometimes a listener will hold the performer's hand, and together they will move or "wind" their linked hands in the rhythm of the song. Such interactions do not disturb the flow of music, and the performer will often respond musically. The person who holds the singer's hand to support them is known as the windáil.

=== Related activities ===
Other sean-nós activities include sean-nós dance, instrumental sean-nós music, and other types of traditional vocal music such as lilting. These activities would traditionally have been performed in the same settings as sean-nós singing. Sean-nós activities are considered a minimalist means of preserving a musical and dance heritage at a time when musical instruments were too expensive for most peasants.

== Modern developments ==
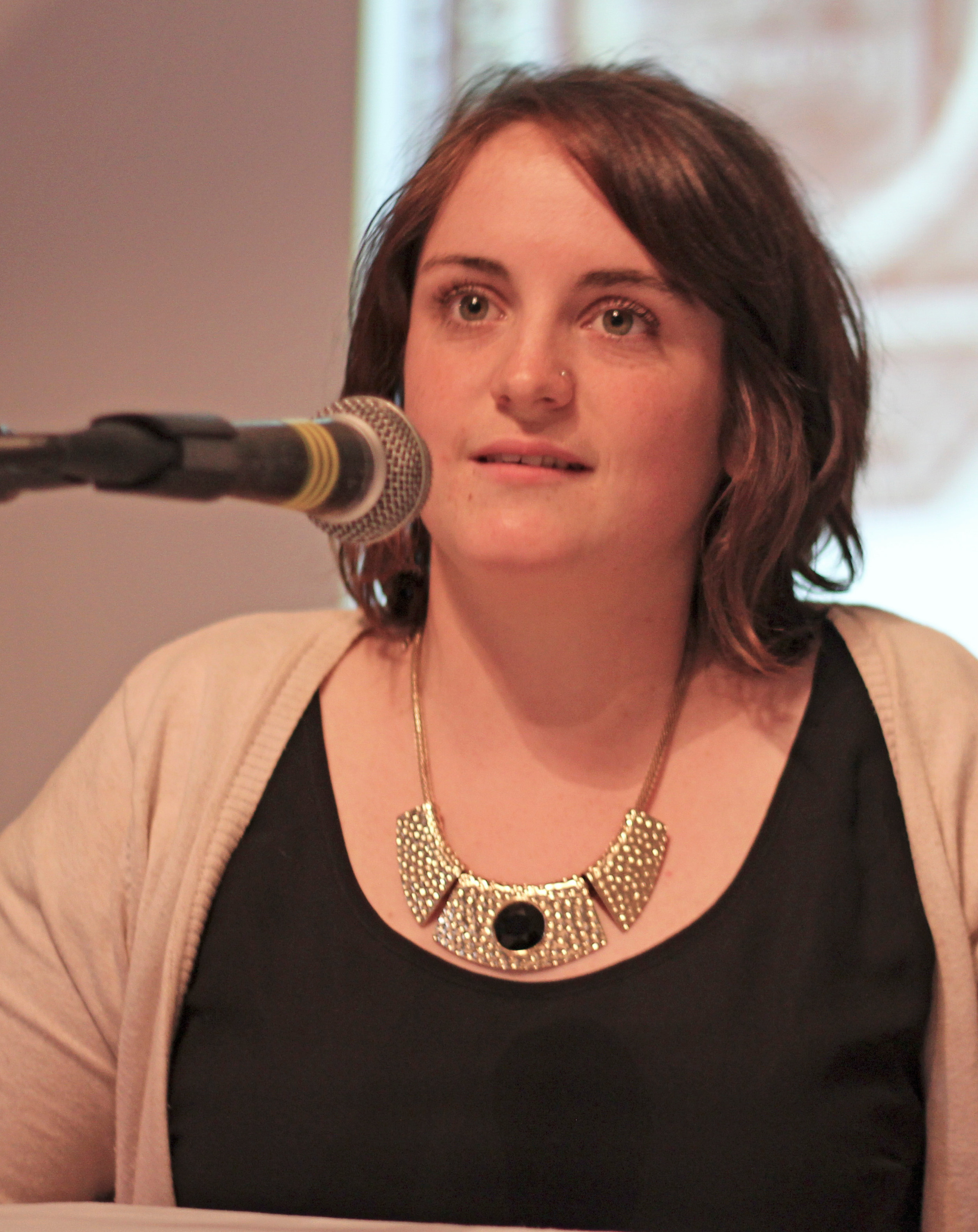
Nell Ní Chróinín, sean-nós singer from Muskerry

Pubs have gradually replaced the traditional setting of the Cèilidh house, and melodramatic non-traditional rebel songs and 'ballads' are often preferred to sean-nós songs. Traditional sean-nós singing has survived in Connemara to a greater extent than in any other region. Previous generations learned the songs in the home and in the locality, but now organised classes, publications and recorded material are the easiest way to learn. The younger generations of sean-nós singers have therefore learnt to sing this way as a "skill" rather than naturally acquiring it. Some enthusiasts have suggested that their polished style is detrimental to the understanding of the lyrics, which should be paramount.

New composition is a controversial issue within sean-nós song circles. Some singers insist that the traditional should be supplemented with new material, arguing that since society has changed, then the content of the lyrics should reflect this. On the other hand, some singers say that only the older, "traditional" songs represent the essence of a sean-nós song and therefore deserve a protected, preferential status. There is often confusion between authentic sean-nós singing and popular music which uses the Irish language. Some young singers have made an effort to restrict their repertoire only to local songs, in order to preserve their local traditions.

Sean-nós singing is largely overlooked in academia. Its association with cultural nationalism within the context of the Gaelic Revival have pushed it to the periphery of Irish musical culture; English language songs and instrumental music are considered "popular", and sean-nós somewhat "elite" and inaccessible.

== See also ==
- List of traditional Irish singers
- Puirt á beul
- Waulking song
- Lilting

== Sources ==
- Dorothea E. Hast and Stanley Scott, Music in Ireland: Experiencing Music, Expressing Culture (New York: Oxford University Press, 2004), 84–136.
