= Charlie Piggott =

Irish traditional musician (born 1948)

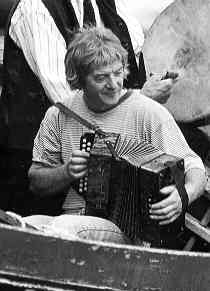
- Charlie Piggott in 2014

Background information
- Born: 14 July 1948 (age 78); Cobh, County Cork, Ireland
- Genres: Irish traditional music
- Occupations: Musician, Singer
- Instruments: Tenor Banjo, Mandolin, Bouzouki, Button Accordion, Tin Whistle
- Years active: 1970–present
- Website: http://www.charliepiggott.net

Charlie Piggott (born 14 July 1948) is an Irish traditional musician, and a founding member of the folk group De Dannan.

He grew up playing music in County Cork, where his first instrument was the button accordion. In the early 1970s, Piggott played banjo in sessions at Galway's Cellar Bar with Frankie Gavin (fiddle), Alec Finn (bouzouki) and Johnnie "Ringo" McDonagh (bodhrán).

In 1973, the group Dé Dannan was formed from sessions at Tigh Hughes, An Spidéal, County Galway. Piggott plays in the old style and many of his seminal recordings have caused him to be hailed as "one of the most influential Irish banjoists of the generation", but after damaging his index finger in an accident on tour he reverted to playing the melodeon.

In 1976, he was a featured artist of the Smithsonian Institution, at the Festival of American Folk Life, for the American bicentennial. He plays a Black Dot Hohner Double-Ray, tuned C#/D.

Piggott has revived many rare traditional melodies and has a reputation for performing them in accordance with the ethos of older players who have passed the music on.

He later founded the Lonely Stranded Band with Miriam Collins (concertina) and Joe Corcoran (bouzouki, guitar & vocals) and their 1996 album met with great success.

In 2000, he teamed up with the Sliabh Luachra fiddler Gerry Harrington to record a Cló Iar-Chonnacht release: "The New Road".

Piggott is co-author, with Fintan Vallely and photographer Nutan Jacques Piraprez, of Blooming Meadows: The World of Irish Traditional Musicians.

Having worked for a long time as a professional musician in Galway featuring regularly on television and radio, he still plays at traditional music festivals in the area.

In 2019, Piggott released a solo album called 'The Days That Are Gone' and followed it in 2020 with 'The Trip We Took Over The Mountain', a duo album in collaboration with his son, the fiddle-player & singer Rowan Piggott.

== Discography ==
- De Danann (1975)
- Selected Jigs Reels and Songs (1977)
- The Mist Covered Mountain (1980)
- Star-Spangled Molly (1981) (see The De Dannan Collection)
- Best of De Dannan (1981)
- The Lonely Stranded Band (1996)
- The New Road (2000)
- The Days That Are Gone (2019)
- The Trip We Took Over The Mountain (2020)
