= Mickey Finn (Irish fiddler) =

Irish fiddler (1951–1987)

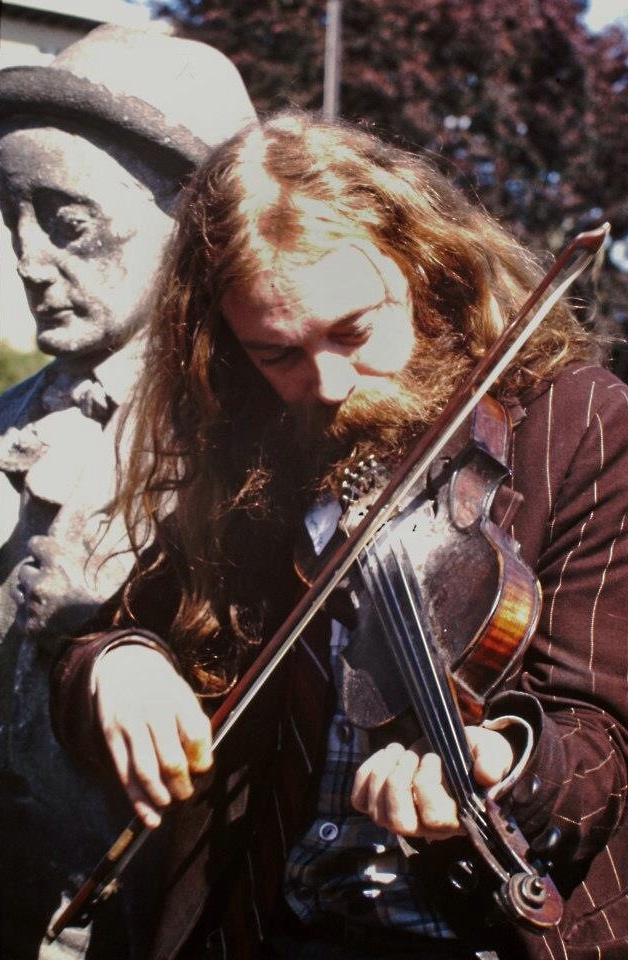
- Finn in 1982

Background information
- Born: 31 December 1951; Callan, County Kilkenny, Ireland
- Died: 15 April 1987 (aged 35)
- Genres: Folk, traditional Irish music
- Occupations: Musician
- Instruments: Fiddle
- Formerly of: Dicklerfitz

Mickey Finn (31 December 1951 – 15 April 1987) was a traditional Irish fiddler. He was a fixture in Galway's traditional music scene during the 1970s and 1980s, playing with artists such as Mary Coughlan, Mick Lally, and Christy Moore.

== Early life ==
Finn was born in Callan, County Kilkenny. He began learning the fiddle in the early 1960s. After his family moved to Ballinrobe, County Mayo in 1963, he was taken under the wing of a Christian Brothers School brother, Brother Forrestal, who trained him in the fiddle style of Sligo fiddler Michael Coleman. The Ballinrobe trio of Mickey (fiddle), along with Joe Heneghan (piano) and Seamus O'Malley (accordion) finished 2nd in the 1965 All-Ireland Fleadh Cheoil Finals (Under 14 Instrumental Trio) in Thurles. Mickey also came 3rd in Ireland (Under 14 Individual fiddle) at the same Fleadh Cheoil finals. They had qualified from the 1965 Connacht Fleadh Cheoil finals in Foxford, County Mayo.

== Career ==
In Galway in 1970, Finn played in traditional music sessions, particularly at the Cellar Bar, and became popular for his rock/traditional/jazz fusion style, never playing a traditional tune exactly the same way twice. In an interview with Kevin McGuire in the Galway Advertiser, Frankie Gavin told of the Cellar Bar sessions, believing Finn to be an influence on contemporary musicians in Galway.

== Contemporaries ==
Finn's Cellar Bar sessions also included actor Mick Lally, who was at that time more noted for his singing than for his acting. Lally was a great singer of comedy songs in the sean-nós style.

Internationally renowned Galway-born blues singer Mary Coughlan was also a close personal friend of Finn. When she recorded a version of Johnny Mulhern's `Delaney's Gone Back on the Wine' she dedicated the song to him .

== Dicklerfitz ==
In the early 1970s, Finn joined singer and guitarist Terry Smith to form the group Dicklerfitz with flute player Mick Treacy, and later, in 1974, with multi-instrumentalist Alec Finn (no relation). Frankie Gavin (fiddler) took part in the group's sessions, as did Gerry Carthy (www.gerrycarthy.com), Pete Galligan, Charlie Harris, Johnny (Ringo) McDonagh, Sean Tyrrell, Jerry Mulvihill, and singers Dolores Keane, Mary Coughlan and Mary Staunton; from these sessions, the group De Dannan was formed. In 1976 Dicklerfitz supported Planxty in Galway.

== Christy Moore ==
Christy Moore has memories of those Galway days. On listening to the Johnny Mulhern song Hard Cases, Moore remarks on his Christy-Chat website how it brought him back to the Cellar Bar days in Galway. Moore also mentions Finn in his song "Sodom & Begorrah". In August 1987, Moore dedicated "Hard Cases" to Finn, saying that going to Galway would never be the same again without Mickey.

== Media ==
Finn appeared in the 1985 Welsh-language TV film Pair of Shoes (Pâr o Sgidiau), comedy-drama road movie starring Neil Tobín, James Bartley and David Kelly. He also appeared in the Bob Quinn film Caoineadh Airt Uí Laoire (1975). The only known videos of Finn are from these two films.

In March 2008, No Cure for Mickey Finn a biographical radio broadcast on RTÉ described his music, personality, and "the symbiotic relationship between traditional music and alcohol". The program was nominated for the RTÉ Prix Europa 2008 awards.

== Family ==
Finn came from a musical family; his parents were accomplished piano players, his father Bill being a composer of tunes. One of Bill's tunes, which was re-arranged by Finn into a Slow-Air, became known as "Mickey Finn's Air" after Finn's death and was recorded by tin whistler Seán Ryan for his CD Minstrel's Fancy (1995) and by Alec Finn on his CD Blue Shamrock (1995). Bill Finn is credited on the sleeve notes of these recordings.

Finn was survived by his wife Lena Ullman, who plays five-string banjo with the Americana band Moonshine, daughter Sadie; two brothers, Billy (who plays flute, whistles, and pipes) and Johnny (guitarist and singer-songwriter); and sisters, Elizabeth (singer), Mary (singer) and Jackie (piano player and singer).
