= Frankie Gavin (musician) =

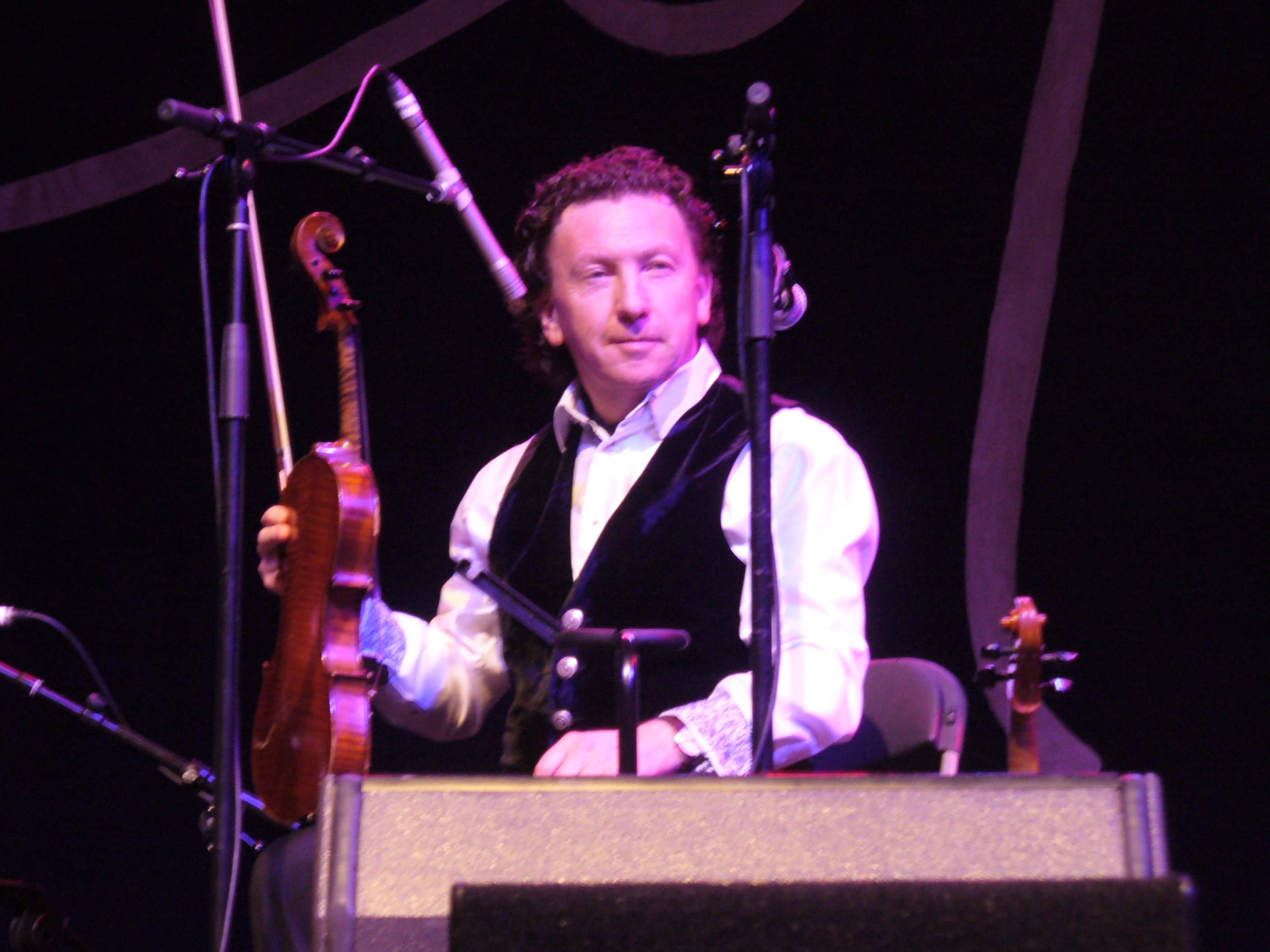
- Frankie Gavin

Background information
- Born: 1956 (age 69–70); Corrandulla, County Galway, Ireland
- Genres: Irish traditional music
- Occupation: Musician
- Instruments: Fiddle, tin whistle, flute, Viola
- Years active: 1960–present

Frankie Gavin (born 1956) is a fiddle player of traditional Irish music. He is recognized as a fiddle-singing pioneer.

== Early years ==
Frankie Gavin was born in 1956 in Corrandulla, County Galway, from a musical family; his parents and siblings being players of the fiddle and accordion. As a child, he played the tin whistle from the age of four and, later, the flute. He received some formal training in music, but his musical ability on the fiddle is mainly self-taught. When 17 years old, he gained first place in both the All Ireland Under-18 Fiddle and Flute competitions.

== Music career ==
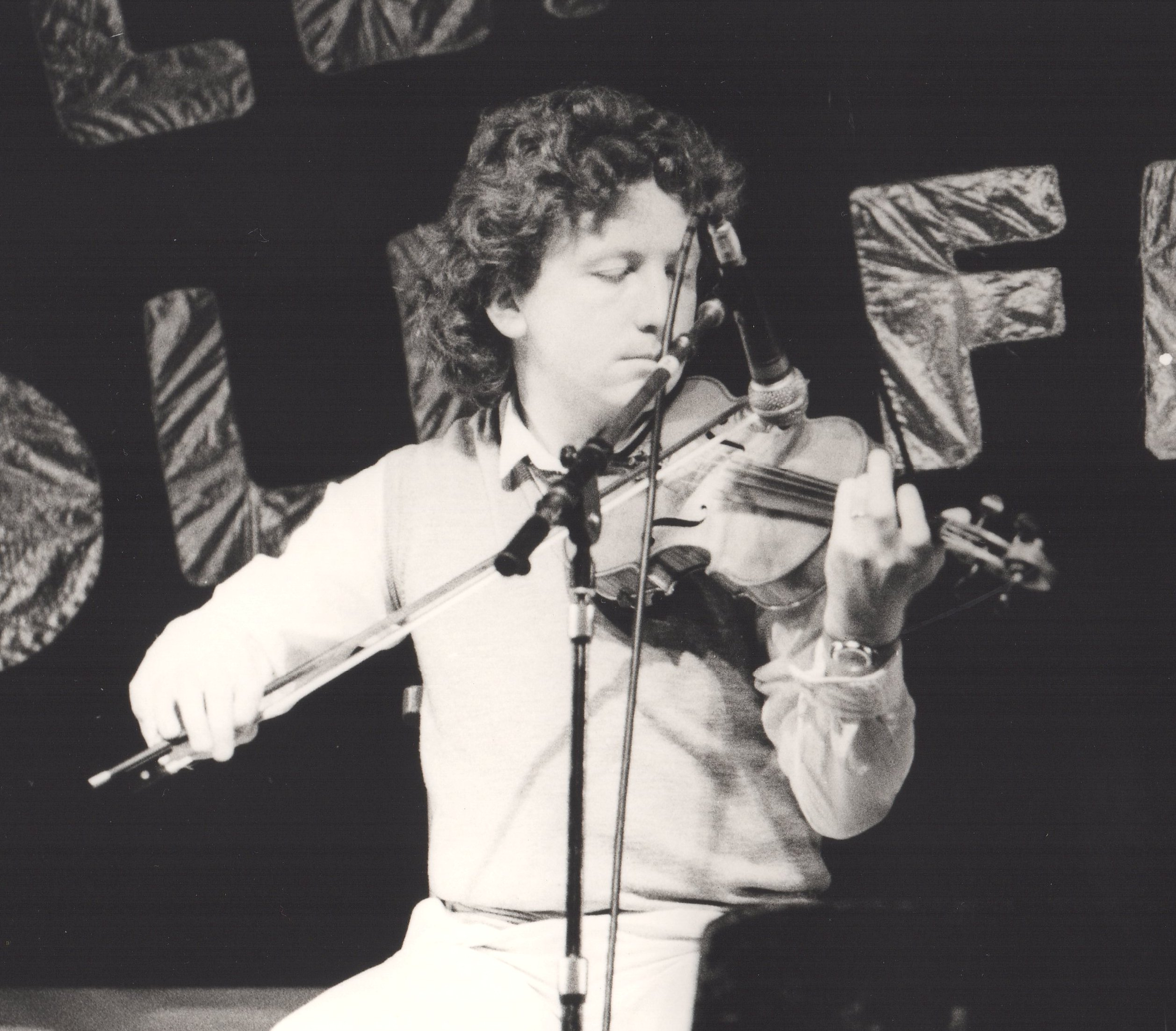
Gavin on stage with De Dannan at the 1985 Trowbridge Folk Festival.

In the early 1970s, Gavin played musical sessions at Galway's Cellar Bar, with Alec Finn (bouzouki, guitar), Mickey Finn (fiddle), Charlie Piggott (banjo), and Johnnie (Ringo) McDonagh (bodhrán). In 1974, from these and further sessions, he founded the group De Dannan with Alec Finn.

When De Dannan split-up in 2003, Gavin founded a new group, Frankie Gavin and The New De Dannan, which led to an acrimonious exchange between Gavin and Finn. In a Hot Press interview, Alec Finn noted that the new group was not De Dannan and that he himself, Alec Finn, had registered the De Dannan name after the split in 2003.

Gavin has played and recorded with Andy Irvine, The Rolling Stones, Elvis Costello, and Stéphane Grappelli, and in 2010, he became reputedly the fastest fiddle-player in the world, with an entry in the Guinness Book of Records.

== Selected discography ==
Solo

- Up and Away (1995)
- Frankie Gavin (1997)
- Frankie Goes to Town (1999)
- Shamrocks & Holly: An Irish Christmas Celebration (1999)
- Fierce Traditional (2001)
- Port Eireann (2022)

With Alec Finn

- Frankie Gavin & Alec Finn (1977)
- Traditional Irish Music on Fiddle and Bouzouki, Volume II (2018)

With Andy Irvine

- Rainy Sundays... Windy Dreams (1980)

With Paul Brock

- Omos Do Joe Cooley: A Tribute to Joe Cooley (1986)

With Elvis Costello

- Spike (1989)

With Stéphane Grappelli

- Stéphane Grappelli in Concert with guest Frankie Gavin (1993) DVD

With The Rolling Stones

- Voodoo Lounge (1994)

With Arty McGlynn (guitar) & Aidan Coffey (accordion)

- Irlande (1994) / Ireland (1997) (live recording at Radio France, Studio 104, Paris, France)

With Sharon Shannon

- Tunes (2007)

With Hibernian Rhapsody

- The Full Score (2008)

With Rick Epping & Jim Foley

- Jiggin' the Blues (2008)

With Roaring 20s Irish Orchestra

- By Heck: A Toast to the 1920s (2018)

With De Dannan

- De Danann (1975)
- The 3rd Irish Folk Festival In Concert (1976)
- Selected Jigs Reels and Songs (1977)
- The Mist Covered Mountain (1980)
- Star-Spangled Molly (1981) (see The De Dannan Collection)
- Best of De Dannan (1981)
- Song For Ireland (1983)
- The Irish RM (1984)
- Anthem (1985)
- Ballroom (1987)
- A Jacket of Batteries (1988)
- Half Set in Harlem (1991)
- Hibernian Rhapsody (1995)
- De Dannan Collection (1997)
- How the West Was Won (1999)
- Welcome to the Hotel Connemara (2000)
- Jigs, Reels & Rock n' Roll (2012)
- Jigs & Jazz II (2014)
