= Aidan Coffey =

Irish traditional accordionist

- Born: County Waterford, Ireland
- Genres: Irish traditional
- Occupation: Musician
- Instrument: Accordion
- Years active: 1988–present

Aidan Coffey is an Irish traditional accordionist from County Waterford (Ireland). He recorded with Irish traditional fiddle players Seamus Creagh and Frankie Gavin and with accompanists Mick Daly, Seán Ó Loingsigh, Alec Finn and Arty McGlynn and he was a member of the traditional band De Dannan from 1988 to 1995.

== Discography ==
Albums

- The Corner House Set
- Dublin to Donegal
- Island to Island with Seamus Creagh
- How the West was Won (De Dannan)
- Seamus Creagh and Aidan Coffey
- The Irish Drum (Colm Murphy)
- Ireland Treasures of Irish Music (Various)
- Irlande with Frankie Gavin and Arty McGlynn
- Half Set in Harlem with De Dannan
- Jacket of Batteries with De Dannan
- Folkworld
- The Session

Contributing artist

- The Rough Guide to Irish Music (1996)
