= Cregg Mill =

Cregg Mill may refer to:

- Cregg Mill, County Galway, Ireland
- Cregg Mill, Isle of Man, historic site among Registered Buildings and Conservation Areas of the Isle of Man
