= Feadóga Stáin 2 =

Album by Mary Bergin

Studio album by Mary Bergin
- Released: 1993
- Genre: Irish Folk
- Label: Shanachie Records

Mary Bergin chronology
Feadóga Stáin	Feadóga Stáin 2

Professional ratings
Review scores
Source	Rating
Allmusic	4.5/5 stars

Feadóga Stáin 2 is the second solo album by Irish traditional whistle virtuoso Mary Bergin.

== Tracks ==
1. Reels: The Flogging Reel; The Ivy Leaf; Trim The Velvet
2. Jigs: The Maid On The Green; The Mooncoin Jig
3. Reels: Eileen Curran; Lomanach Cross; Billy Brocker's, Miss Thorton's Reel
4. Air: Aisling Gheal
5. Polkas: Julia Clifford's; Jenny Lind's Polka
6. Hornpipes: The Humours Of Ballyconnell
7. Rigaudon Reel: The Cameronion
8. Reels: Richard Dwyer's; Miss McDonald
9. Jigs: Sliabh Russell; Kitty's Rambles; Padraig O'Keefe's
10. Reels: Dulaman Na Binne Bui; A Stor, A Stor, A Ghr, The Blackhaired Lass
11. Reels: Gus Jordan's; Big Pat's Reel; Sweeny's Dream; Eddie Maloney's
12. Air: Seolfaimid Araon Na Geanna Romhainn
13. Reels: The Galtee Rangers; The Gneevgullia Reel; Paddy Kelly's
14. Hornpipes: O'Callaghan's; Cooley's
15. Reels: Micho Russell's Reel; The Laurel Tree; The Woman Of The House

== Musicians ==
- Mary Bergin: whistle on all
- Kathleen Loughnane: harp
- Dearbhaill Standún: fiddle
- Joe McKenna: uilleann pipes
- Antoinette McKenna: harp
- Alec Finn: bouzouki, guitar
- Johnny McDonagh : bodhrán
- Johnny Campbell : bass guitar
- Tom Stephens : guitar
