= List of tin whistle players =

This is a list of tin whistle players, people known for playing the tin whistle.

- David Amram
- Mary Bergin
- Paul Brady
- Cormac Breatnach
- Willie Clancy
- Andrea Corr of the Irish Folk band The Corrs
- Brian Finnegan
- Vin Garbutt
- Carmel Gunning
- Vinnie Kilduff
- Joanie Madden
- Cathal McConnell
- Michael McGoldrick
- Stephan Micus
- Paddy Moloney
- Matt Molloy
- Carlos Núñez
- Seán Potts
- Micho Russell
- Spider Stacy

== See also ==
- Tin whistle
