= Mary Staunton =

Irish singer and accordion player

Mary Staunton is an Irish musician, concertina and accordion player.

A native of County Mayo, Staunton released her first album, Bright Early Mornings, in 1998. It was produced with support from Alec Finn of De Dannan, who also appears on the album.

Staunton's second album, Circle of Friends, was launched in July 2010. Circle of Friends was also produced by Alec Finn and launched at Connolly's pub, Kinvara, by actor Brendan Gleeson, whose fiddle playing features on the CD. Other featured artists include John Prine and Rick Epping.

As of 2010, Staunton lived in Maree, Oranmore. She is married to Jerry Mulvihill, a banjo player, and has two children.

== Discography ==
- Bright Early Mornings, (Fuschia Music) 1998
- Circle of Friends, (Fuschia Music) 2010
