= All Smiles Tonight =

Studio album by Poor Creature
- Released: 11 July 2025
- Genre: Psychedelic folk
- Length: 49:27
- Label: River Lea
- Producer: John Murphy

Singles from All Smiles Tonight
- 1. "The Whole Town Knows" Released: 7 April 2025; 2. "All Smiles Tonight" Released: 17 June 2025

All Smiles Tonight is the debut studio album by Irish trip hop trio Poor Creature, consisting of Ruth Clinton and Lankum members, Cormac Mac Diarmada and John Dermody. It was released on 11 July 2025 via River Lea Recordings in LP, CD and digital formats.

== Background ==
The album, produced by John "Spud" Murphy, incorporates Irish folk, trip hop and psychedelic folk, and comprises eight songs that are reinterpretations of Irish folk, with a total runtime of approximately forty-nine minutes.

"The Whole Town Knows" was released on 7 April 2025 as the first single. It was followed by the title track and second single on 17 June 2025.

== Reception ==
Professional ratings
Review scores
Source	Rating
The Guardian	4/5 stars
Hot Press	9.5/10
Narc	4/5 stars
Spectrum Culture	70%
The Irish Times	5/5 stars
Uncut	4/5 stars

The album was described by Spectrum Culture as "one of those records that doubles as a history lesson, where their interpretations can sound so emotionally tumultuous, even demented, that you're compelled to learn the origins of these songs." In a four-star review for The Guardian, Jude Rogers observed that it encompasses "cowboy songs, Irish ballads, bluegrass and other traditional songs in a misty, playful lightness that somehow also carries an eerie power."

Rating the album five stars, Tony Clayton-Lea of the Irish Times noted Clinton's vocals as delivering "shivers and delights in equal measure," calling it a contender for "Album of the Year". Caroline Kelly, writing for Hot Press, opined, "The sonic backdrops are as vibrant as any other kind of storytelling: wormholes of raves long past; pummeling trance – and then a dream-like lightness, guitars and synthetic swirls."

Assigning the album four stars, Uncut's Nick Hasted stated, "The tenderness of the band's name is reflected in their music, and the greater sense of space they require makes All Smiles Tonight an airier, optimistic contribution to Ireland's new wave, despite trad songs haunted by limbo and loss." It received a 4/5 rating from Narc, whose reviewer Robin Webb described songs on the album as "of poignant intimacy that not only reflect the times of love and loss when they were written but act as commentary on our modern global predicament where climate becomes the reason for no longer living like this."

== Track listing ==
All Smiles Tonight track listing
No.	Title	Writer(s)	Length
1.	"Adieu Lovely Erin"	Traditional	5:54
2.	"Bury Me Not"	Traditional	5:27
3.	"The Whole Town Knows"	Jimmie Helms; Wanda Helms	6:52
4.	"Lorene"	Charlie Louvin; Ira Louvin	5:22
5.	"An Draighneán Donn"	Traditional	5:16
6.	"All Smiles Tonight"	T. B. Ransom	5:49
7.	"Hicks' Farewell"	Traditional	4:20
8.	"Willie-o"	Traditional	9:59
Total length:			49:27

== Personnel ==
Credits adapted from Tidal.

=== Poor Creature ===
- Ruth Clinton – arrangements, synthesizer
- John Dermody – arrangements, drums
- Cormac Mac Diarmada – arrangements (all tracks), fiddle (tracks 1, 3), accordion (2), guitar (4), viola (5), cello (6–8)

=== Additional contributors ===
- John Murphy – production, engineering, mixing
- Harvey Birrell – mastering
- Aoife Hammond – guitar (3, 6)
- Rick Epping – concertina (7)
