= Feadóga Stáin =

Album by Mary Bergin

Studio album by Mary Bergin
- Released: 1979
- Genre: Irish Folk
- Label: Shanachie Records

Mary Bergin chronology
Feadóga Stáin	Feadóga Stáin 2

Professional ratings
Review scores
Source	Rating
Allmusic	5/5 stars

Feadóga Stáin ("Of the Tin Whistle"), Mary Bergin's debut album, has been credited with establishing the tin whistle as one of the first tier among the standard instruments of Irish traditional music. Members of Irish group De Dannan contributed accompaniment and the album is mostly a trio of tin whistle, Irish bouzouki and Bodhrán (Irish frame drum) . This album has been cited by Joanie Madden as highly influential in the development of her own playing, and is generally considered by critics and scholars as a "definitive" or milestone album.

== Tracks ==
No.	Title	Length
1.	"Rileanna (Reels): Ril Gan Ainm / Cinnte Le Dia (Ah, Surely) / The Union Reel"	2:51
2.	"Rileanna (Reels): Inion Mhic Sheain (Miss Johnson's) / Mike Russell's"	2:32
3.	"Portanna (Jigs): Tom Billy's / The Langstern Pony"	3:20
4.	"Rileanna (Reels): Sean Reid's / The Drunken Landlady"	2:22
5.	"Fonn Mall (Slow Air): Liam O Raghallaigh"	2:37
6.	"Rileanna (Reels): Bean Ui Chroidheain (Mrs. Crehan's) / Gearoid O Comain (Gerry Commane's) / An La Baisti (The Rainy Day)"	3:04
7.	"Portanna (Jigs): Port Sean Seosamh / Sean Tiobrad Arann / The Rothai An Tsaoil (Wheels Of The World)"	2:54
8.	"Rileanna (Reels): The Blath Na Smeire Duibhe (Blackberry Blossom) / Maud Miller / Mo Thrua Go Bfaca Me Ariamh Thu (I Wish I Never Saw You) / Chuig Na Gluine I Ngaineamh Thu (Up To Your Knees In Sand)"	2:31
9.	"Cornphiopai (Hornpipes): Garrai Na Bhfeileoig / Miss Galvin"	2:29
10.	"Rileanna (Reels): The An Bhean Ar An Oilean (Lady On The Island) / The Ril Na Ceolchoirme (Concert Reel) / The An Bothan Sa Phortach (Hut In The Bog)"	2:48
11.	"Fonn Mall (Slow Air): Mo Mhuirnin Ban"	3:08
12.	"Rileanna (Reels): Mick Hand's / The Reel Of Mullinavat"	2:57
13.	"Portanna (Jigs): The Port Mhuineachain (Monaghan Jig) / Nora Crionna"	3:00
14.	"Rileanna (Reels): Ta Citi Ar Shiuil Ag Cru Lei (Kitty Gone A Milking) / Scleip Na Hoiche Areir (Last Night's Fun) / The An Ghaoth A Bhogann An Eorna (Wind That Shakes The Barley)"	2:33

== Musicians ==
- Mary Bergin : F whistle on 3,5,7,11, Eb whistle on 1,4,8,10,12, D whistle on 6, C whistle on 13, Bb whistle on 2,9, low G whistle on 14
- Alec Finn : bouzouki, mandocello
- Johnny 'Ringo' McDonagh : bodhrán, bones
