= Ireland in the Eurovision Song Contest 2007 =

- Eurovision Song Contest 2007
- Participating broadcaster: Radio Telefís Éireann (RTÉ)
- Country: Ireland
- Selection process: Artist: Internal selection Song: Eurosong 2007
- Selection date: Artist: 14 November 2006; Song: 16 February 2007

Competing entry
- Song: "They Can't Stop the Spring"
- Artist: Dervish
- Songwriters: John Waters; Tommy Moran

Placement
- Final result: 24th, 5 points

Participation chronology

Ireland was represented at the Eurovision Song Contest 2007 with the song "They Can't Stop the Spring", written by John Waters and Tommy Moran, and performed by the band Dervish. The Irish participating broadcaster, Radio Telefís Éireann (RTÉ), selected its entry through the national final Eurosong 2007, after having previously selected the performers internally. Four songs faced a public televote, ultimately resulting in the selection of "They Can't Stop the Spring" as the Irish entry.

As one of the ten highest placed finishers in 2006, Ireland automatically qualified to compete in the final of the Eurovision Song Contest 2007. Performing during the show in position 4, Ireland placed 24th (last) out of the 24 participating countries with 5 points.

== Background ==
Prior to the 2007 contest, Radio Éireann (RÉ) until 1966, and Radio Telefís Éireann (RTÉ) since 1967, had participated in the Eurovision Song Contest representing Ireland 40 times since RÉ's first entry in 1965. They have won the contest a record seven times in total. Their first win came in 1970, with "All Kinds of Everything" performed by Dana. Ireland holds the record for being the only country to win the contest three times in a row (in 1992, 1993, and 1994), as well as having the only three-time winner (Johnny Logan, who won in 1980 as a singer, 1987 as a singer-songwriter, and again in 1992 as a songwriter). The Irish entry in 2006, "Every Song Is a Cry for Love" performed by Brian Kennedy, managed to qualify to the final and placed tenth.

As part of its duties as participating broadcaster, RTÉ organises the selection of its entry in the Eurovision Song Contest and broadcasts the event in the country. The broadcaster confirmed its intentions to participate at the 2007 contest on 16 October 2006. From 2003 to 2005, RTÉ had set up the talent contest You're a Star to choose both the song and performer to compete at Eurovision for Ireland, with the public involved in the selection. The broadcaster had internally selected the artist in 2006, while the song was chosen in a televised competition. For the 2007 contest, the same procedure was continued.

== Before Eurovision ==
=== Artist selection ===
On 14 November 2006, the broadcaster announced that it had internally selected the band Dervish to represent Ireland in Helsinki. Prior to Dervish's selection as the Irish contestant, artists that were rumoured in Irish media to be in talks with RTÉ included former contest winners Johnny Logan and Linda Martin, the winner of the talent contest You're a Star Lucia Evans and singer Ronan Keating. Along with the announcement that Dervish would represent Ireland on 14 November, RTÉ announced that a national final would be held to select their song.

=== Eurosong 2007 ===
On 22 November 2006, RTÉ opened a submission period where composers were able to submit their songs for the competition until 8 January 2007. The broadcaster sought songs that fit the style of both Dervish and the contest. At the closing of the deadline, over 200 songs were received. The competing songs were selected through two phases involving three separate five-member jury panels appointed by RTÉ; the first phase involved the first two juries reviewing all of the submissions and selecting a shortlist of songs, while the second phase involved the final jury selecting the four finalist songs. The members of the jury that selected the finalist songs consisted of writer and performer Shay Healy, Universal Music Ireland managing director Dave Pennefather, publisher and IMRO board member Johnny Lappin, commentator and broadcaster Larry Gogan, and singer Eleanor Shanley. The finalist songs were announced on 7 February 2007.

The national final, Eurosong 2007, was held on 16 February 2007 at the Studio 4 of RTÉ in Dublin, hosted by Pat Kenny and broadcast on RTÉ One as well as online via the broadcaster's official website rte.ie during a special edition of The Late Late Show. The show also featured guest performances from Björn Again, former contest winners Dana Rosemary Scallon, Eimear Quinn and Brotherhood of Man, and Dmitry Koldun (who would represent Belarus in 2007), as well as commentary from a panel that consisted of former contest winner Linda Martin, commentator Marty Whelan and presenter Eileen Dunne. All four competing songs were performed by Dervish and following a public televote, "They Can't Stop the Spring" was selected as the winning song. The national final was watched by 742,000 viewers in Ireland.

Final – 16 February 2007
R/O	Song	Songwriter(s)	Place
1	"The Thought of You"	Matti Kallio	4
2	"Walk with Me"	Stig Lindell	3
3	"Until We Meet Again"	Malachi Cush; Pam Sheyne; Martin Sutton; Don Mescall	2
4	"They Can't Stop the Spring"	John Waters; Tommy Moran	1

== At Eurovision ==
The Eurovision Song Contest 2007 took place at Hartwall Arena in Helsinki, Finland, and consisted of a semi-final on 10 May and the final on 12 May 2007. According to Eurovision rules, all nations with the exceptions of the host country, the "Big Four" (France, Germany, Spain, and the United Kingdom) and the ten highest placed finishers in the 2006 contest are required to qualify from the semi-final in order to compete for the final; the top ten countries from the semi-final progress to the final. As one of the ten highest placed finishers in the 2006 contest, Ireland automatically qualified to compete in the final on 12 May 2007. In addition to their participation in the final, Ireland is also required to broadcast and vote in the semi-final on 10 May 2007. On 12 March 2007, an allocation draw was held which determined the running order and Ireland was set to perform in position 4 during the final, following the entry from Belarus and before the entry from Finland.

In Ireland, the semi-final and the final were broadcast on RTÉ One with commentary by Marty Whelan. The two shows were also broadcast via radio on RTÉ Radio 1 with commentary by Larry Gogan.

=== Final ===
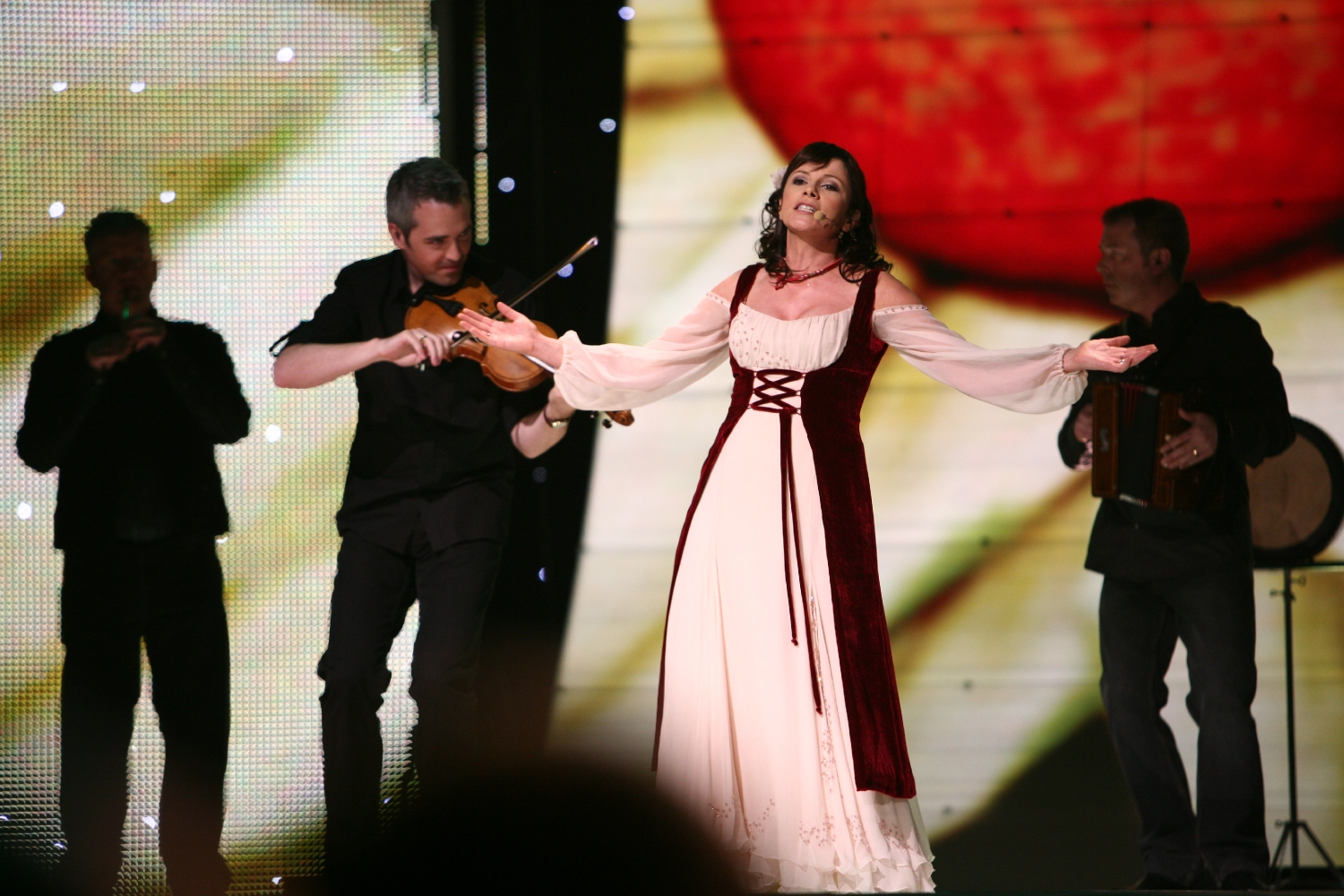
Dervish during a rehearsal before the final

Dervish took part in technical rehearsals on 7 and 8 May, followed by dress rehearsals on 11 and 12 May. The Irish performance featured the lead singer of Dervish, Cathy Jordan, in a red and white dress playing the bodhrán. The remaining members of the group, dressed in plain black shirts with jeans, performed a routine which featured them following Jordan around the stage. The LED screens displayed large flowers in bloom against a starlit background and the stage catwalk displayed a floating Irish flag at the beginning of the performance. Ireland placed twenty-fourth (last) in the final, scoring 5 points.

=== Voting ===
Voting during the three shows involved each country awarding points from 1-8, 10 and 12 to the other competing countries; counties were not allowed to register votes for themselves. All countries participating in the contest were required to use televoting and/or SMS voting during both evenings of the contest. In the event of technical difficulties, or if the votes of the country did not meet the EBU threshold, then a back-up jury's results were to be used. Ireland awarded its top 12 points from televoting to Latvia in the semi-final and to Lithuania in the final. The nation received 5 points in the final—all from Albania—placing 24th (last). RTÉ appointed Linda Martin as its spokesperson to announce the Irish votes during the final. The tables below visualise a complete breakdown of points awarded to Ireland in the final of the Eurovision Song Contest 2007, as well as by the country in the semi-final and final.

==== Points awarded to Ireland ====
Points awarded to Ireland (Final)
Score	Country
12 points	
10 points	
8 points	
7 points	
6 points	
5 points	Albania
4 points	
3 points	
2 points	
1 point	

==== Points awarded by Ireland ====
Points awarded by Ireland (Semi-final)
Score	Country
12 points	Latvia
10 points	Poland
8 points	Serbia
7 points	Hungary
6 points	Belarus
5 points	Denmark
4 points	Andorra
3 points	Estonia
2 points	Moldova
1 point	Slovenia

Points awarded by Ireland (Final)
Score	Country
12 points	Lithuania
10 points	Latvia
8 points	Ukraine
7 points	United Kingdom
6 points	Russia
5 points	Hungary
4 points	Serbia
3 points	Romania
2 points	Moldova
1 point	Georgia

== After Eurovision ==
Despite finishing in last place, the broadcast of the final was watched by 780,000 viewers in Ireland with a market share of 53%, representing an increase from the previous year. Dervish announced that they would continue to play their music, stating that they "play music for music's sake" and that "it's about heart and soul, it's not about votes". Claims of "vote hijacking" were also discussed after the nation awarded its 12 points to Lithuania despite getting little elsewhere.

Criticism was also faced by RTÉ from Irish media, both over their selection of Dervish and the production of a forthcoming television special on the band, with claims that their performance was "disastrous" and that the broadcaster had signed a written contract with the band only after announcing their participation. In response, an RTÉ spokesperson stated that "contracts can be signed after such an announcement" as "you don't have to sign on the dotted line if you have a verbal agreement". The broadcaster later stated that they would be "having a sit-down and looking at our geographical position and going through the whole process", thus indicating a possible withdrawal from the 2008 contest. RTÉ confirmed their intentions to participate at the 2008 Eurovision Song Contest on 3 October 2007, announcing an open selection to choose both the artist and song to represent Ireland.
