= Seamie O'Dowd =

Irish musician

Seamie O'Dowd is an Irish musician.

== Biography ==
Seamie O'Dowd is a guitarist, singer, and songwriter who also plays fiddle, harmonica, mandolin, and a number of other instruments.

He has travelled worldwide playing music and has shared stages and played with many great musicians and bands including the following; Máirtín O'Connor, Cathal Hayden, Christy Moore, Declan Synott, The Chieftains, Jimmy Higgins, Tommy Emmanuel, Dervish, Steve Wickham, Matt Molloy, Liam O'Flynn, Thom Moore, Dick Gaughan, Cathy Jordan, Rick Epping, Kieran Quinn, John Joe Kelly, Martin Hayes, Dennis Cahill and Cathal Roche.

His experience also includes recording production, teaching and more recently, film soundtrack work, and encompasses solo performance as well as extensive work with bands and small groups as both a member and a session musician...

== Discography ==
- Headful Of Echoes (SOD CD001, 2006)
- Wood & Iron (SOD SODCD2, 2014)
- Melodic Reflection (with Kieran Quinn) (Not On Label, 2017)
- Live At The Hawk's Well (Not On Label SODCD3, 2019)
- Further Down The Lane (SOD SODCD004, 2023)
