= Cregg River =

River in Ireland

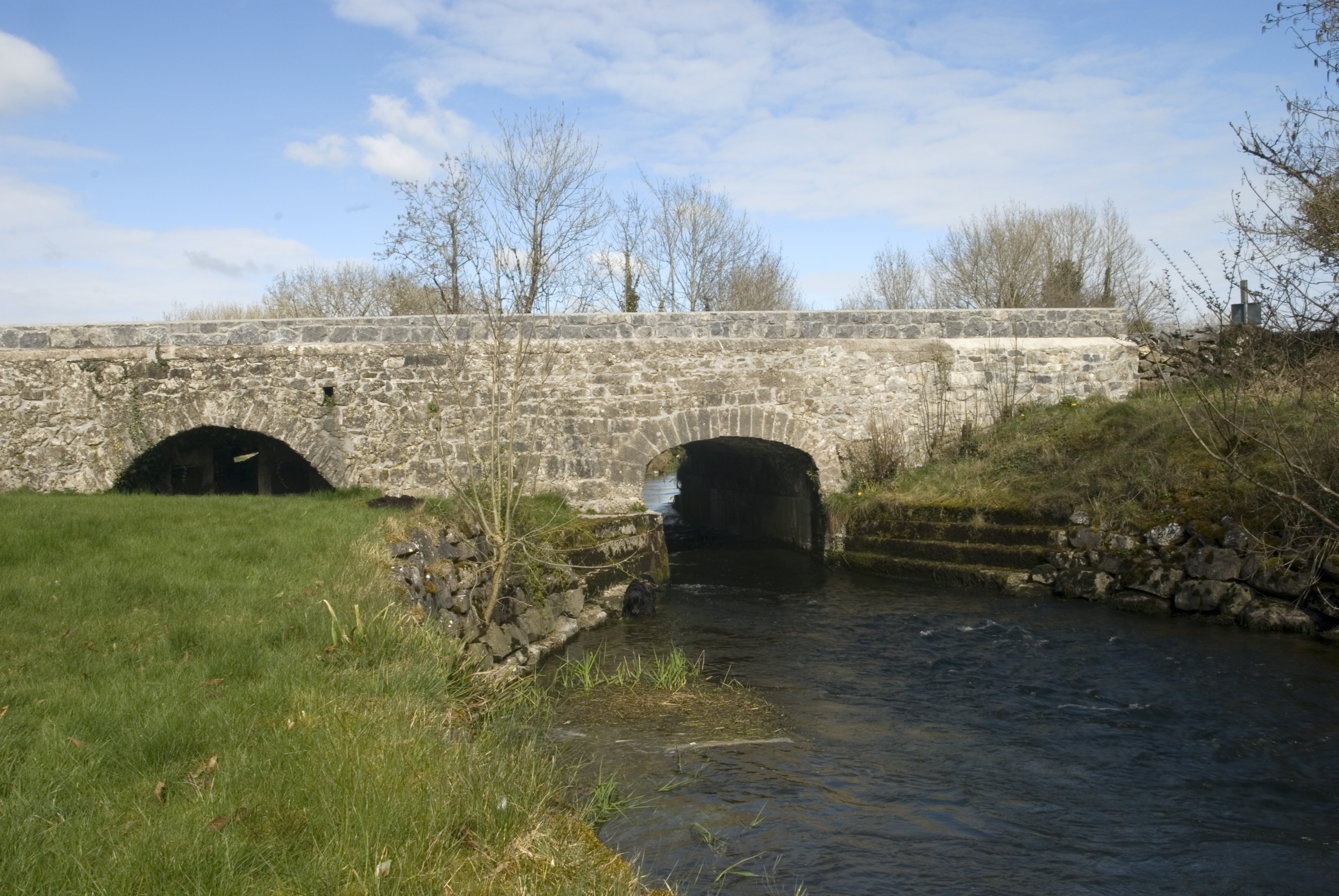
- Native name: Abhainn na Creige (Irish)

Location
- Country: Ireland
- District: County Galway

Physical characteristics
- Source
  - location: Aughclogeen, Corrandulla, County Galway, Ireland
  - coordinates: 53°23′35″N 8°57′47″W
  - elevation: 20 m (66 ft)
- Mouth
  - location: Barranny, Lough Corrib, County Galway, Ireland
  - coordinates: 53°21′7″N 9°3′30″W
  - elevation: 8 m (26 ft)
- Length: 11 km (6.8 mi)

Basin features
- Tributaries
  - left: Waterdale

The Cregg River (Irish: Abhainn na Creige) is a river in County Galway, Ireland. The river rises from a spring a half mile to the north of Cregg Mill, and flows for about seven miles into Lough Corrib. The upper stretch of the river is a nursery for fish stocking of Lough Corrib, while salmon and brown trout fishing is permitted on the lower stretches.

The Cregg River once powered three watermills, of which the converted Cregg Mill is the remaining example. The three mills stood together around the Cregg Mill bridge. The bridge there consists of seventeen arches, but only one arch is currently used. The nineteenth century Ordnance Survey Ireland maps show that the river was much wider at that point. However, due to artificial changes to the water level of Lough Corrib and the canalisation of the river, the river is now much narrower.
