= Antoinette McKenna =

Irish singer and harpist

- Born: Antoinette Bergin; 25 April 1952; Dublin
- Died: 30 September 2012 (age 60); Roundwood, County Wicklow
- Occupation(s): Folk musician, harpist
- Relatives: Mary Bergin (sister)

Antoinette Bergin McKenna (25 April 1952 – 30 September 2012) was an Irish traditional singer and harpist from Dublin. She toured with her sister and her husband, both musicians, and made several albums.

== Early life and education ==
McKenna was born and raised in Dublin. Her father was from Kilkenny and her mother was from Wicklow; both were musical. She attended Sion Hill Dominican Convent School in Blackrock, and participated in harp and singing competitions in her teens.

== Career ==
McKenna performed as a member of Sean Nua, a quartet first named Magenta Music, and accompanied her husband Joe, who learned to play pipes from Leo Rowsome and other members of the famed Pipers Club. She also played in ensembles with her sister, musician Mary Bergin.

The McKennas performed at festivals in the United Kingdom and with Sean Nua in Europe, and found a warm reception in the United States. They performed in Vermont and Maryland in 1979, in Virginia in 1981 and 1993, in North Carolina in 1983 and 1984, in California and at the Border Folk Festival in Texas, in 1983, in Maine in 1983 and 1985, Michigan in 1993, and at the Lowell Folk Festival in Massachusetts in 1997. McKenna "sings laments and ballads in both Irish and English, accompanying herself on the harp to create a haunting, echoing effect," according to a 1985 report. They made several recordings for Shanachie Records, an American label.

== Personal life ==
Antoinette Bergin married Joe McKenna in the mid-1970s; they lived in Dublin. She died 30 September 2012, in Roundwood, County Wicklow, at the age of 60.

== Recordings ==
- Magenta Music (1975)
- Irish Pipes & Harp (1978)
- The Best Of Joe & Antoinette McKenna (1982)
- At Home (1992)
- Farewell to Fine Weather (1992)
