= Dervish (band) =

Trad band from Sligo, Ireland

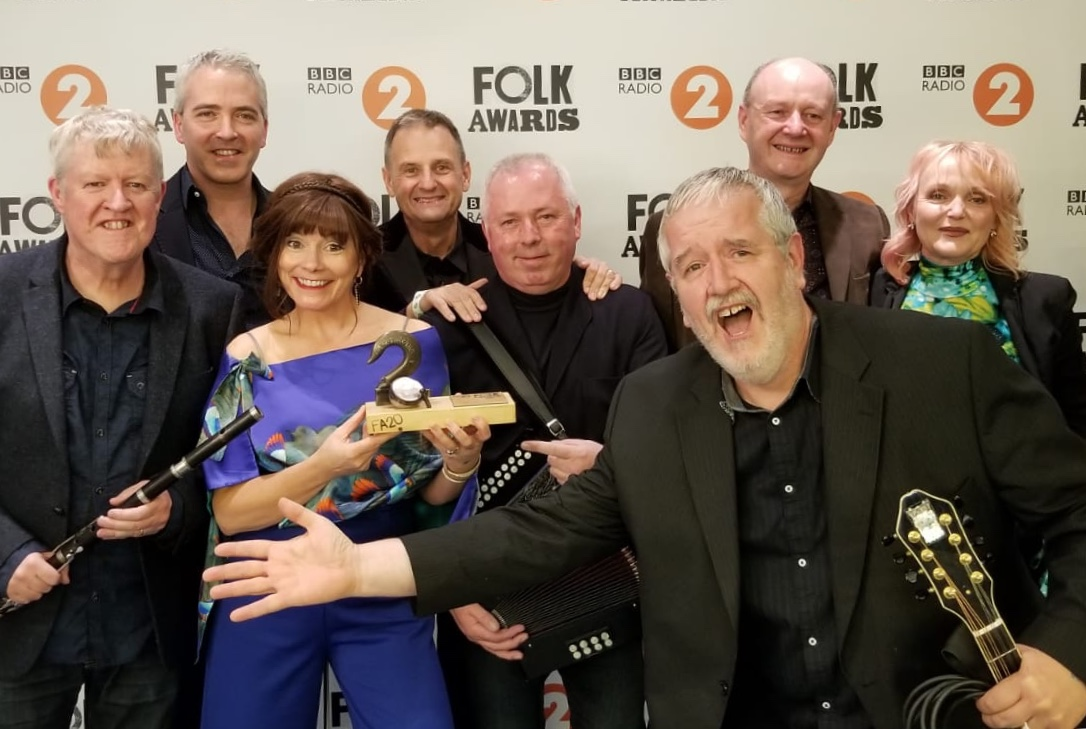
- BBC Lifetime Achievement Award 2019

Background information
- Origin: County Sligo, Ireland
- Genres: Traditional, folk
- Years active: 1989–present
- Members: Catherine "Cathy" Jordan – Vocals, bodhrán and bones Brian McDonagh – Mandola; Thomas "Tom" Morrow – Fiddle; Michael Holmes – Bouzouki; Shane Mitchell – Accordion; Liam Kelly – Flute, whistles
- Past members: Martin McGinley (founding member), Shane McAleer, Seamie O'Dowd - Guitar, Fiddle
- Website: www.dervish.ie

Dervish is an Irish traditional music group from County Sligo, Ireland which has been described by BBC Radio 3 as "an icon of Irish music". They were formed in 1989 by Liam Kelly, Shane Mitchell, Martin McGinley, Brian McDonagh, and Michael Holmes and have been fronted by singer Cathy Jordan since 1991. They represented Ireland in the final of the Eurovision Song Contest 2007, singing a song written by John Waters and Tommy Moran. In 2019 they released an album on the US Rounder Records label called The Great Irish Song Book featuring a selection of classic Irish songs sung by a number of well known singers including Steve Earle, Andrea Corr, Vince Gill, Kate Rusby, Imelda May, Rhiannon Giddens, The Steel Drivers, Brendan Gleeson, Abigail Washburn, and Jamey Johnson. In 2019 they received a lifetime achievement award from the BBC.

== History ==
The band was originally called The Boys of Sligo; an album under this title, with Martin McGinley on fiddle, and with no vocals, was released by Sound Records (SUN CD1).

In 1991 the band were joined by Roscommon-born singer Cathy Jordan and fiddle player Shane McAleer. Dervish's first album, Harmony Hill, was released in 1993. In 1994 their second album, Playing with Fire, was released. In 1996 Dervish released At the End of the Day.

Their fourth album, Live in Palma, was recorded in front of a live audience in 1997. In 1998 McAleer left the band and was replaced by Sligo musician Séamie O'Dowd and fiddle player Tom Morrow. Dervish's fifth album, Midsummer's Night, was released in 1999. In 2001 Dervish released Decade, a compilation of tracks from their first five albums. In 2003 they released Spirit, followed by A Healing Heart in 2006.

Eurovision Song Contest 2007

Dervish performed as the Irish entry for the Eurovision Song Contest 2007. They finished last (with five points which were awarded to them by the Albanian back-up jury because of a failed televote), for their performance of "They Can't Stop The Spring".

2012 Boycott of Israel

In the spring of 2012, Dervish was one of two Irish bands that canceled heavily advertised concerts in Israel citing a cultural boycott of Israel. The band's lead vocalist, Cathy Jordan, stated "it was very naïve of me to think our motives would not be misunderstood and misrepresented. So much so it started an avalanche of negativity which has made it impossible for us to make the trip regardless of our motives." Jordan added that "Although I was aware of the concerns with our proposed visit to Israel, I wasn’t quite prepared for the extent of the venom directed at us." Irish Justice Minister Alan Shatter accused the Ireland Palestine Solidarity Campaign (IPSC) of "cyberbullying" Dervish into withdrawing from the concerts. IPSG National co-ordinator Kevin Squires stated that the organization had directed its supporters to target Dervish's website, although he denied Jordan's claim that there was any "venom" directed towards the band.

== Discography ==
- The Boys of Sligo (1989)
- Harmony Hill (1993)
- Playing with Fire (1995)
- At the End of the Day (1996)
- Live in Palma (1997)
- Midsummer's Night (1999)
- Decade (2001)
- Spirit (2003)
- A Healing Heart (2005)
- Travelling Show (2007)
- The Thrush in the Storm (2013)
- Celebration!! 1989-2014 (2014)
- The Great Irish Song Book (2019)
- The Great Irish Song Book Vol 2: Poets and Storytellers (2026)

== Bibliography ==
- Neal Walters & Brian Mansfield (ed.) (1998) MusicHound Folk: The Essential Album Guide, p. 217-8, ISBN 1-57859-037-X ), (Dervish entry, page 217, Dervish entry, page 218).

Awards and achievements
Preceded by Brian Kennedy with "Every Song Is a Cry for Love"	Ireland in the Eurovision Song Contest; 2007	Succeeded by Dustin the Turkey with "Irelande Douze Pointe"
