= Rick Epping =

Rick Epping (born August 22, 1949) is a California-born musician who has immersed himself in American old-time and Irish traditional music since the 1960s. He is a player of the harmonica, concertina, banjo and jaw harp.

During the 1970s he lived in Ireland where he studied traditional Irish music. He was the 1975 All-Ireland Harmonica champion and a member of the folk group Pumpkinhead. He has recorded with other Irish and American musicians and groups over the years, including Andy Irvine, Christy Moore, Mick Hanly, Bob Zentz, George Winston, Mary Staunton, Priscilla Herdman and Robbin Thompson.

Epping worked for the Hohner company for many years and during that time patented the "Extreme Bending" harmonica, which includes additional reeds that allow players to "bend" notes that cannot be so altered on traditional diatonic instruments. He conducts workshops internationally for Hohner harmonicas.

Epping has involved himself with a number of musicians and projects, including the trio "The Unwanted", which features himself, Dervish singer Cathy Jordan and fiddler Seamus O'Dowd.

== Discography ==
- Pumpkinhead – Pumpkinhead (Mulligan LUN 001; 1978)
- Jiggin’ the Blues (Greentrax G2CD7011; 2008) with Frankie Gavin and Jim Foley
- Tall Ships (Norfolk Festevents, 2000) with Scuttlebutt
- Music From The Atlantic Fringe (Compass, 2009) with the Unwanted
- Stone Walls & Street Lights (Whirling Discs WHRL018, 2016) with New Road
- Pay Day (Whirling Discs WHRL019, 2018) with the Unwanted
