= Cathy Jordan =

Cathy Jordan (Irish: Caitlín Nic Siúirtáin)
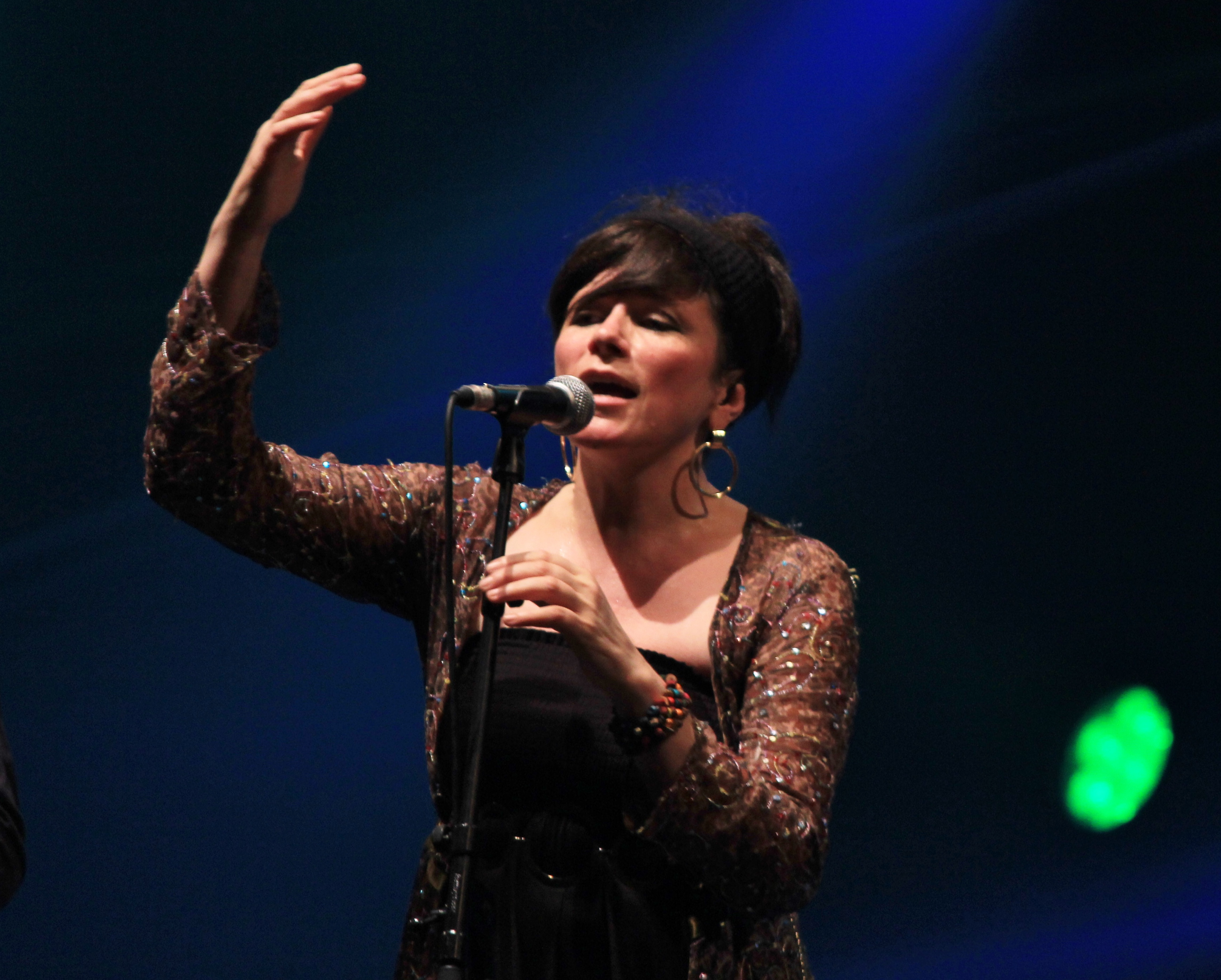
- Cathy Jordan during the Festival Interceltique de Lorient in 2014.

Background information
- Born: Scramogue, County Roscommon, Ireland
- Origin: County Roscommon, Ireland
- Genres: Irish traditional

Cathy Jordan (born in Scramogue, County Roscommon in 1972) is a singer, songwriter, and multi-instrumentalist, playing guitar, bodhran, bones and Irish bouzouki. She has been the lead vocalist for the traditional Irish music band Dervish since 1991, and is a solo performer as well. Jordan is also a member of the group The Unwanted. Her first solo album, entitled All the Way Home, was released in January, 2012.

== Discography ==
=== With Dervish ===
- Harmony Hill
- Playing with Fire
- At the End of the Day
- Live in Palma
- Midsummer's Night
- Decade
- Spirit
- Healing Heart
- Travelling Show

=== With The Unwanted ===
- Music from the Atlantic Fringe (2010)

=== Solo ===
- All the Way Home (2012)
