= Corrandulla =

Village in County Galway, Ireland

Corrandulla Cor an Dola
- Village
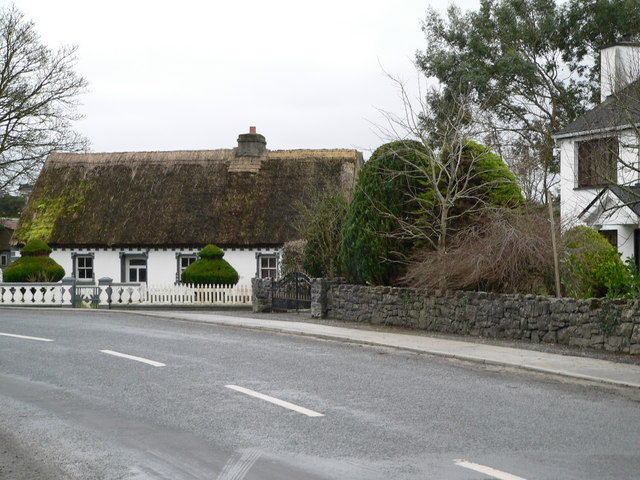
- Thatched building in Corrandulla village

- Location within Ireland
- Coordinates: 53.3988°N 8.9951°W
- Country: Ireland
- Province: Connacht
- County: Galway

Population (2022)
  - Total: 398
- Irish grid reference: M338391

Corrandulla (Irish: Cor an Dola, meaning 'the round hill') is a small village and census town in County Galway, Ireland. It is 15 km north of Galway city, in the civil parish of Annaghdown. Corrandulla was designated as a census town by the Central Statistics Office for the first time in the 2016 census, at which time it had a population of 241 people. The population was 398 at the 2022 census.

The church in the village, Saint Brendan's Catholic Church, was built in 1831 and is in Annaghdown/Corrandulla parish of the Roman Catholic Archdiocese of Tuam. Corrandulla National School, also known as Scoil Bhrige agus Bhreandain Naofa, had an enrollment of 271 pupils as of the 2020 school year.

An annual agricultural show, the Corrandulla Show, has been run in Corrandulla since 1977; The 2020 event was cancelled as part of the response to the COVID-19 pandemic in Ireland.

== See also ==
- Cregg Mill, County Galway
