= Alec Finn =

British musician (1944-2018)

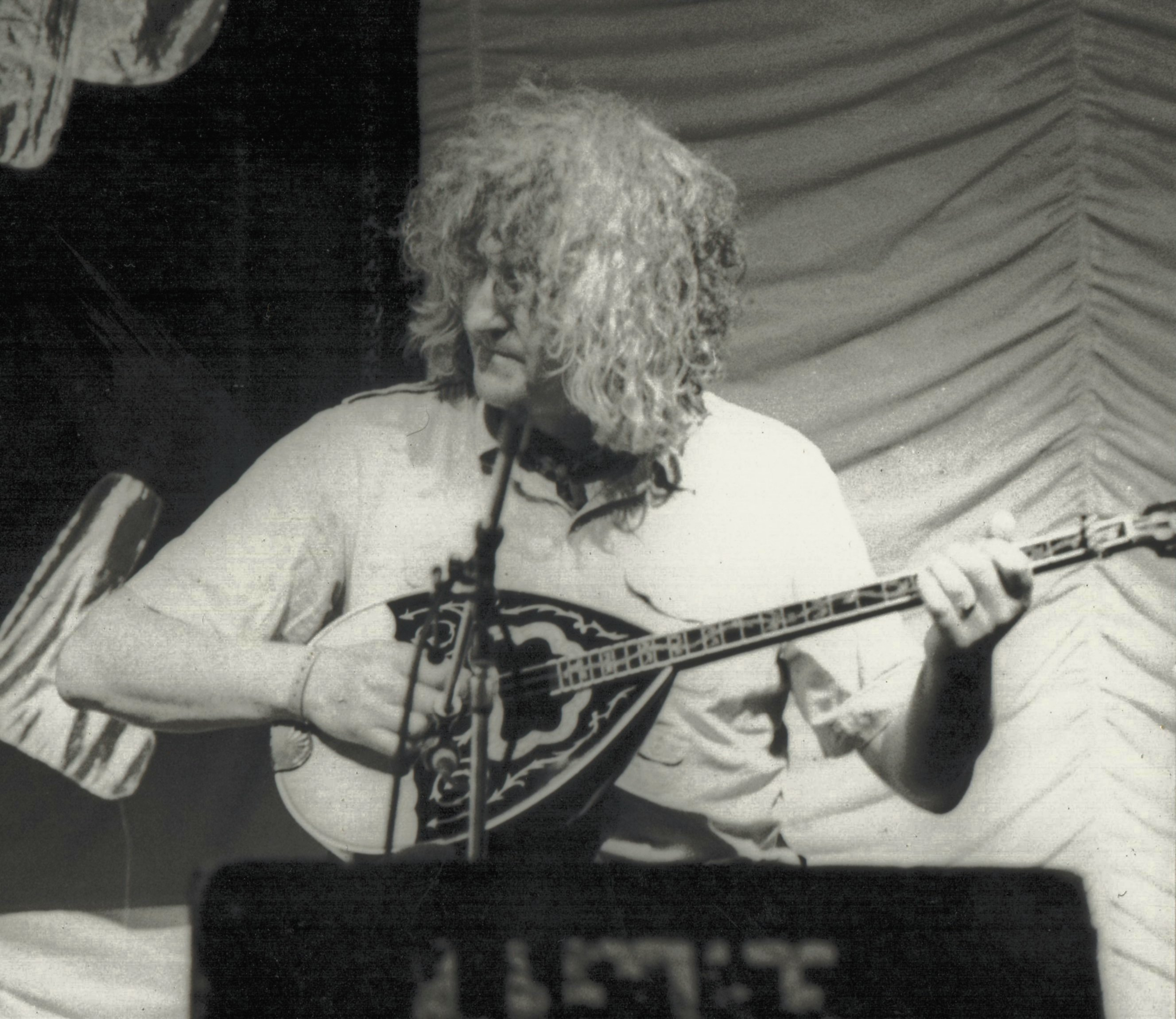
- Alec Finn on stage with De Dannan at the 1985 Trowbridge Folk Festival

Background information
- Born: Alexander J. Phinn; 4 June 1944; Rotherham, West Riding, England, United Kingdom
- Died: 16 November 2018 (aged 74) Oranmore Castle
- Genre: Irish traditional music
- Occupation: Musician
- Instruments: Bouzouki, Guitar, Harmonica, Mando-cello
- Years active: 1970s–2018
- Formerly of: De Dannan

Alexander J. Phinn (4 June 1944 – 16 November 2018), known professionally as Alec Finn, was a British-born traditional musician who is famous for his unique style of accompaniment on the bouzouki.

He was best known for founding De Dannan in 1974 with Frankie Gavin, Johnny "Ringo" MacDonagh and Charlie Piggott, after a series of music sessions at Tigh Hughes, An Spidéal, County Galway.

== Music ==
Finn took up the bouzouki in the 1970s, from a background of playing the guitar in skiffle and blues music. In contrast to most Irish players, he played a round-backed Greek bouzouki, one of the older-style trichordo three course (six string) instruments tuned DAD. The Greek tuning gave him a versatile modal rhythmic background on which to create counterpoint to the melody. He also continued to record as an accomplished guitarist, and played a variety of other string instruments.

From the late 1970s and early 80s, he accompanied several prominent Irish instrumentalists including Frankie Gavin, Mary Bergin and Noel Hill. Many of the recordings he appeared on in this era have been highly acclaimed, and are thought of as influential within the Irish tradition.

He performed with De Dannan up to its dissolution in 2003. After the dissolution of the group, Finn copyrighted the name De Danann (note the slightly different spelling). A dispute arose in July 2009 with his former colleague Frankie Gavin for using the name De Dannan for the Frankie Gavin Quartet, a group which had been in existence parallel to De Dannan since 1991. This resulted in an exchange of legal letters and a public feud (including a confrontational radio interview), and a souring of relations between the two musicians.

Finn reformed a second, parallel version of De Danann with banjoist/keyboardist Brian McGrath, accordionist Derek Hickey, fiddler Mick Conneely, singer Eleanor Shanley, and fellow original De Danann member Johnny "Ringo" McDonagh on bodhrán. They recorded "Wonderwaltz" in 2010.

Frankie Gavin and Alec Finn eventually reconciled in 2016, resuming joint stage appearances and recording two further albums together.

== Personal life ==
Alec Finn was the older brother of the author Gervase Phinn. He changed the spelling of his surname from Phinn to Finn upon moving to Ireland, from his childhood home in Rotherham, West Riding.

After living in various places in Ireland, including Dublin (where he shared a flat with Phil Lynott) and County Galway, he eventually moved to Oranmore Castle with his wife and two children. His son, Cian, also became a musician.

Throughout his life he was keenly interested in birds of prey, which resulted in him often taking a hawk into pubs with him in his youth. He was also a talented artist, contributing artwork to many of the albums he was featured on.

He was the subject of a 2018 TG4 documentary about his life, in which he revealed that he had cancer. He died shortly after the programme was aired, in November 2018.

== Discography ==
- Frankie Gavin & Alec Finn (1977)
- Feadóga Stáin, with Mary Bergin (1979)
- Noel Hill & Tony Linnane, with Noel Hill and Tony Linnane (1979)
- Feadóga Stáin 2, with Mary Bergin (1993)
- Blue Shamrock, solo (1994)
- The Wind Among the Reeds, with Tommy Keane & Jacqueline McCarthy (1995)
- Frankie Goes to Town (1999)
- Springwell, with Kevin Macleod (1999)
- Polbain to Oranmore, with Kevin Macleod (2003)
- Innisfree, solo (2003)
- Waiting for a Call, with Tommy Peoples (2003)
- At Complete Ease, with John Carty & Brian Rooney (2011)
- The Corner House Set, with Frankie Gavin, Aidan Coffey and Colm Murphy (2016)
- Alec & Cian Finn, with Cian Finn (2018)
- Traditional Irish Music on Fiddle and Bouzouki, Volume II (2018)

With De Danann

- De Danann (1975)
- The 3rd Irish Folk Festival In Concert (1976)
- Selected Jigs, Reels and Songs (1977)
- The Mist Covered Mountain (1980)
- Star-Spangled Molly (1981) (see The De Dannan Collection)
- Best of De Dannan (1981)
- Song For Ireland (1983)
- The Irish RM (1984)
- Anthem (1985)
- Ballroom (1987)
- A Jacket of Batteries (1988)
- Half Set in Harlem (1991)
- Hibernian Rhapsody (1995)
- De Dannan Collection (1997)
- How the West Was Won (1999)
- Welcome to the Hotel Connemara (2000)
- Wonderwaltz (2010)

== Articles & References ==
- Interview (1991) + discography, by Paul Magnussen
- Kevin Macleod's obituary for Alec, containing lots of detail about his life.
- Long, Harry. (2005). The Waltons Guide to Irish Music: A Comprehensive A-Z Guide to Irish and Celtic Music in All Its Forms, Waltons Publishing, Dublin, Ireland, p. 136-7, ISBN 1-85720-177-9.
- Phinn, Gervase. (2010) Road to the Dales. The Story of a Yorkshire Lad. Michael Joseph Ltd., ISBN 978-0718149116
- Wallis, Geoff & Sue Wilson. (2001). The Rough Guide to Irish Music, Rough Guides, London, England, p. 377-9, ISBN 1-85828-642-5.
