= Cregg Mill, County Galway =

Flour mill in County Galway, Ireland

Cregg Mill
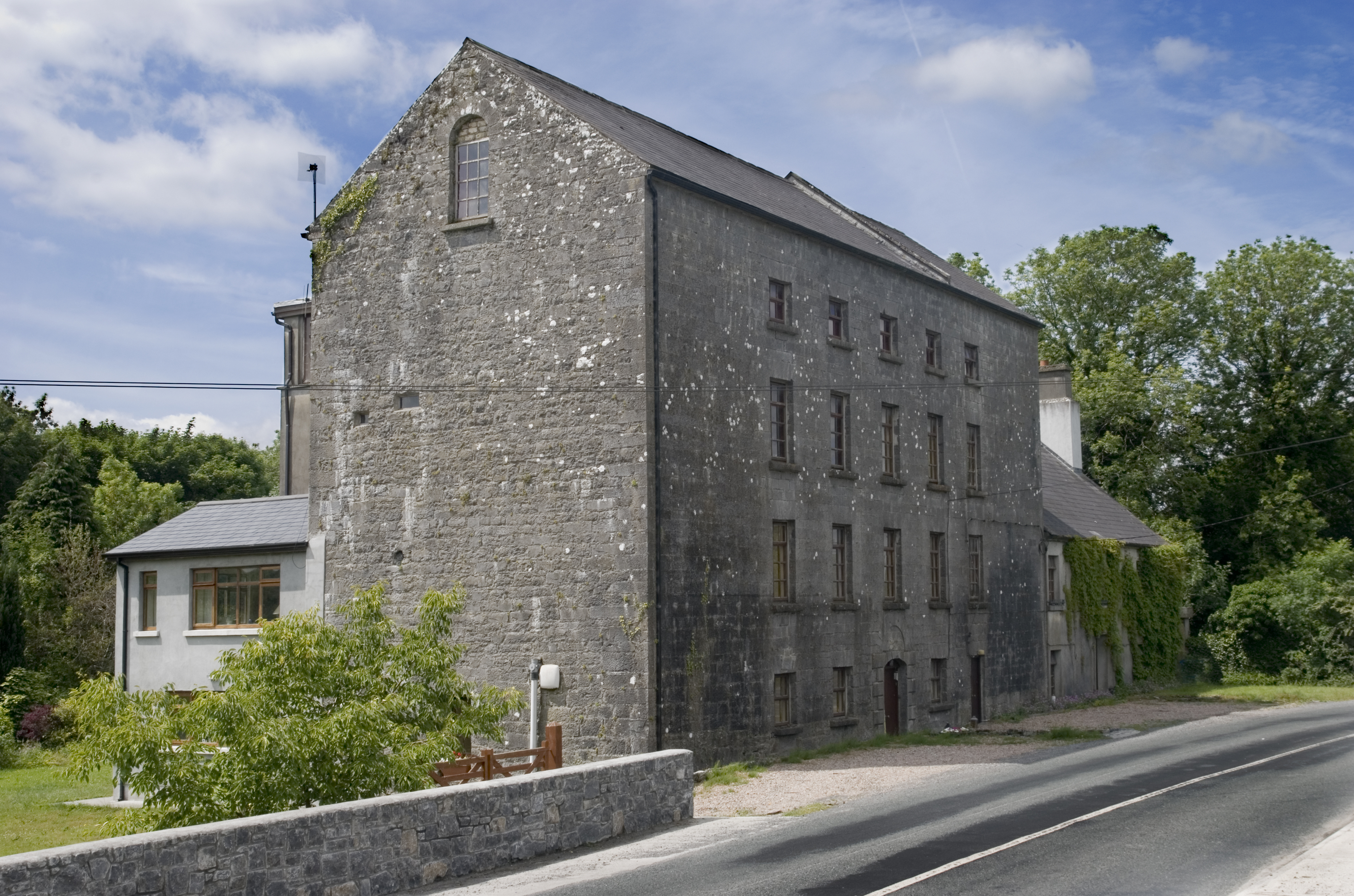
- Cregg Mill and miller's cottage

Flour mill
- Current status: Standing, usage changed
- Structural system: Limestone
- Location: Drumgriffin, Corrandulla, County Galway
- Coordinates: 53°23′15″N 8°58′26″W

Construction
- Built: c. 1780
- Renovated: c. .1976
- Floor count: 4 (originally 3)

References
- "Cregg Mill webpage". Archived from the original on 4 September 2014.

Cregg Mill is a converted 18th-century watermill in the townland of Drumgriffin, near Corrandulla village in County Galway, Ireland, approximately 9 miles (14 km) from Galway City. The mill serviced the local area, including neighbouring Cregg Castle, and served as a feeding centre for the poor of Corrandulla during the Great Famine. An advertisement in the early twentieth century shows that wheat, rye, oats, and barley were kiln-dried and ground there.

The mill is on the Cregg River, which rises from a spring a half mile to the north and flows into Lough Corrib.

== History ==
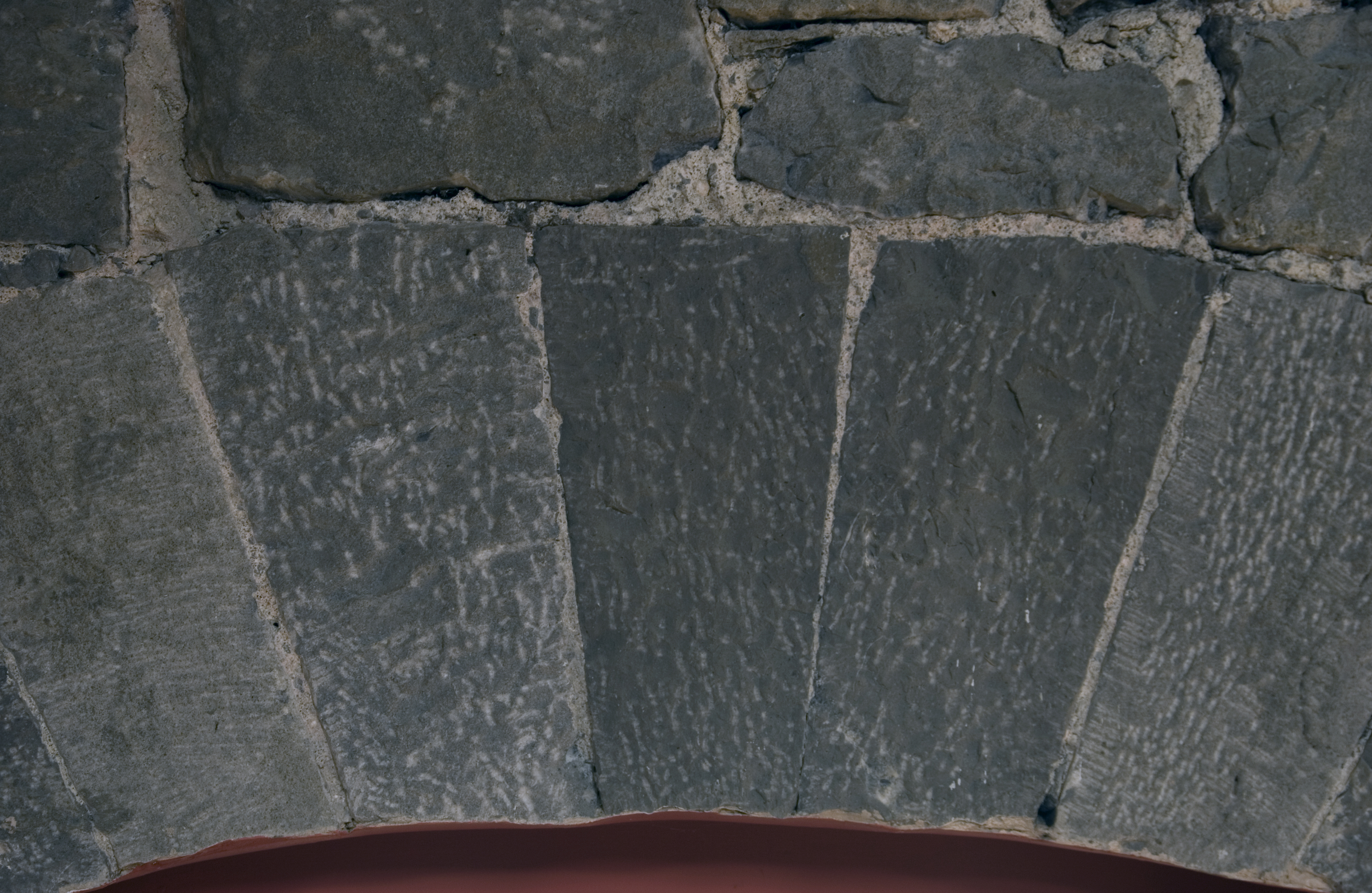
Cregg Mill: detail of coursed stone window interior

The mill was built between 1760 and 1800, and the first edition (1842) of the Ordnance Survey Ireland map shows that, originally, three watermills stood at the Cregg River bridge - the current mill building, in the townland of Drumgriffin, and two further mills in the townland of Aucloggeen, one on the other side of the bridge, and the other, a much smaller building, on the opposite side of the road, with the river dividing to service all three buildings.

The 1845 Valuation Office house book for Annaghdown parish records Patrick Wade as occupier of a corn mill in the townland of Aucloggeen, with a note stating that "this mill was burned on Friday Nov. the 4th '53". The book further records that the mill had a wheel 12 feet in diameter and 4 feet in breadth, with a fall of water of 4 feet. It was equipped with a pair of grinding stones, 2 fans, 3 sets of elevators, and a sifter. A further mill, also occupied by Patrick Wade, appears in the house book for the townland of Drumgriffin. This mill had a wheel diameter and breadth of 11 feet and 2 feet 6 inches, respectively, a fall of water of 4 feet, and was equipped with 2 pairs of grinding stones, one shelling drum, 4 fans, and 4 sets of elevators. In the finalised 1853 edition of Griffith's Valuation, only the latter mill is mentioned as functioning at Cregg (in the townland of Drumgriffin), with Patrick Wade listed as the miller. The miller's cottage adjoins the mill. In the third edition (1913) of the Ordnance Survey Ireland map only the current Cregg Mill is standing, and it is marked as "Flour Mill in ruins".

In 1918 a newspaper article noted that "efforts are being made to re-establish the Cregg Corn Mills, Annaghdown, on a co-operative basis" to service the local farmers. By 1919 work had commenced on repairing the mill to a working condition, and readers were urged to buy the "few shares left" in the co-operative and assist in "establishing an industry that shall remain as a monument to their patriotism and business accumen". The co-operative was named "Harward Wade, Son and Co., Ltd." The mill was equipped with French burr grinding stones and Irish shelling stones, and a flat head, tiled kiln for drying oats. Milling restarted on 17 October 1919, producing oatmeal and wholemeal, but not flour.

By 1935 the company had gone bankrupt and the initiative ended in acrimony, with Francis Brennan Wade applying for the winding up of the company. But in 1940, Francis Brennan Wade began advertising the mill as open again for business.

In 1953 the ESB had its local headquarters at the mill for the Rural Electrification scheme, with the notice stating that 325 houses in the area were ready for wiring.

By 1958 the mill was again for sale as a working mill, with the equipment listed as "a modern tiled drying kiln [...], 2 pair French burr stones, 1 pair shelling stones for oatmeal, pair combined oatmeal shelling seives, combined oatmeal duster, 1 double pair elevators, 1 single pair elevators, friction hoist, and all the usual pulleys and shafting".

In 1963 the mill and miller's cottage were being sold as a disused mill, together with lands nearby at Drumgriffin, Cregduff and Park townlands. At some stage the mill wheel was acquired by the Salthill Hotel, Galway.

In the late 1970s the mill was converted from a three-storey structure with wooden floors into a four-storey structure with concrete floors, designed to be an interior design studio with studio workshops and bedroom accommodation. By 1983 the mill and cottage were once again for sale, and were sold in 1985.

In 2014 Cregg Mill and cottage were advertised for sale, with the advertisement noting that the property comprised three individual residential units (the mill, the former miller's cottage, and an apartment) totalling 1,114.8 m^{2} (12,000 sq ft), with 27 rooms in total including a top floor loft style gallery of 139.35 m^{2} (1,500.0 sq ft). The mill remained for sale in 2016 and was eventually sold in August 2019.

== Structure ==
The mill is constructed of limestone - ashlar on the façade and coursed elsewhere. The mill's entry in the National Inventory of Architectural Heritage (NIAH) describes such an ashlar façade as "a rarity, suggesting that the landowner spent considerable money on building the mill". The window sills are tooled limestone, with round-headed windows at the original attic level of gables. The NIAH entry notes that the appearance of the mill is "reminiscent of the façade of a country house and the doorcase may be compared to those of the Slane Mill (c.1760), Co. Louth".

The mill is included on Galway County Council's Record of Protected Structures.
