= Mary Bergin =

Irish folk musician (born 1949)

- Born: 13 September 1949 (age 76)
- Genres: Irish traditional music, Folk music, Baroque music
- Occupation: Musician
- Instrument: Tin whistle
- Label: Shanachie

Mary Bergin (born 13 September 1949) is an Irish traditional musician who is widely acknowledged as one of the great masters of the tin whistle. She plays in both the Irish Traditional and Baroque styles.

== Life and career ==
Mary Bergin was born in Shankill, County Dublin, Ireland. Her parents Joe and Máire were melodeon and fiddle players, respectively. Mary started learning to play the tin whistle at the age of nine.

Bergin won the All Ireland tin whistle championship in 1970. Her two virtuosic recordings of the solo tin whistle, Feadóga Stáin (1979) and Feadóga Stáin 2 (1993), have been critically cited as "outstanding and unequalled".

Bergin moved to An Spidéal, County Galway, in the early 1970s and played with many of the up-and-coming stars of the Irish music scene, notably De Danann and Ceoltóri Laighin. She is currently a member of the group Dordán, who perform Irish traditional music and Baroque music with pieces by George Frideric Handel, Henry Purcell and a tune from Johann Sebastian Bach's Little Notebook for Anna Magdalena Bach.

In addition to releasing two solo albums, which aided the popularisation of modern traditional Irish tin whistle playing, and three albums with Dordán, Bergin has taught hundreds of students, in Ireland, across Europe, and in the United States, to play the whistle.

== Playing style ==
Bergin was exposed to the music of many renowned musicians from an early age, but her style is particularly influenced by flute player Packie Duignan and the whistle playing of Willie Clancy. She plays the whistle "left-handed", with the right hand covering the upper tone holes, unlike most whistle players who play with the left hand on top.

Bergin's playing is characterized by great feeling, technical virtuosity, and a respect for the music. Music scholar Fintan Vallely has described her playing as "brightly ornamented but uncluttered", with "crisp articulation". Writer and flute player Grey Larsen uses similar terms, describing her playing as "precise", "elegant", and "streamlined".

== Discography ==
=== Mary Bergin ===
- Feadóga Stáin (1979)
- Feadóga Stáin 2 (1993)

=== Dordán ===
- Irish Traditional and Baroque Music (1 July 1991)
- Jigs to the Moon (18 October 1994)
- The Night Before...A Celtic Christmas (25 August 1998)
- Celtic Aire (13 July 1999)

== See also ==
- List of Irish musicians

== Bibliography ==
- Ronan Nolan. "Mary Bergin". RamblingHouse. Archived from the original on 1 February 2006.
- Ryan Foley. "Irish Folk: The Bluffer's Guide". Stylus Magazine. Archived from the original on 21 May 2011.
