= The De Dannan Collection =

2003 album by De Dannan

The De Dannan Collection is an album by Irish traditional music group De Dannan. It is a 2003 version of their 1981 album "Star-Spangled Molly" with the tracks put into a different order, and two additional tracks ("The Teetotaler" set, and "Then You'll Remember Me").

== Track listing ==
1. The Cuckoo's Nest Medley (instr) (Trad)
2. Come Back again To Me Mavourneen (Aylward)
3. New Irish Barn Dance (instr) (Trad)
4. Conlon's Jig/ Padraig O'Keefe's Head O' Cabbage/ Boys of Malin (instr) (De Danann/ De Dannan/ De Dannan/ De Dannan)
5. My Irish Molly-O (Schwartz and Jerome)
6. Hey Jude (instr) (J. Lennon & P. McCartney)
7. Maggie (James A. Butterfield and George W. Johnson)
8. Coleraine Jig/ Derraine's/ John Stenson's (instr) (Trad/ De Dannan/ Trad)
9. Kitty's Wedding/ The Rambler (instr) (Trad)
10. The Teetotaler/ St Anne's (instr) (Trad/ Trad)
11. Then You'll Remember Me (Unknown)
12. Morrison's/ The Tailor's Thimble/ Wellington's (instr) (Trad)
13. I'm Leaving Tipperary (?Pat White)

Running time 47 minutes 10 sec. No personnel named but Maura O'Connell sings "Maggie".
