= Tin whistle =

Six-holed woodwind instrument

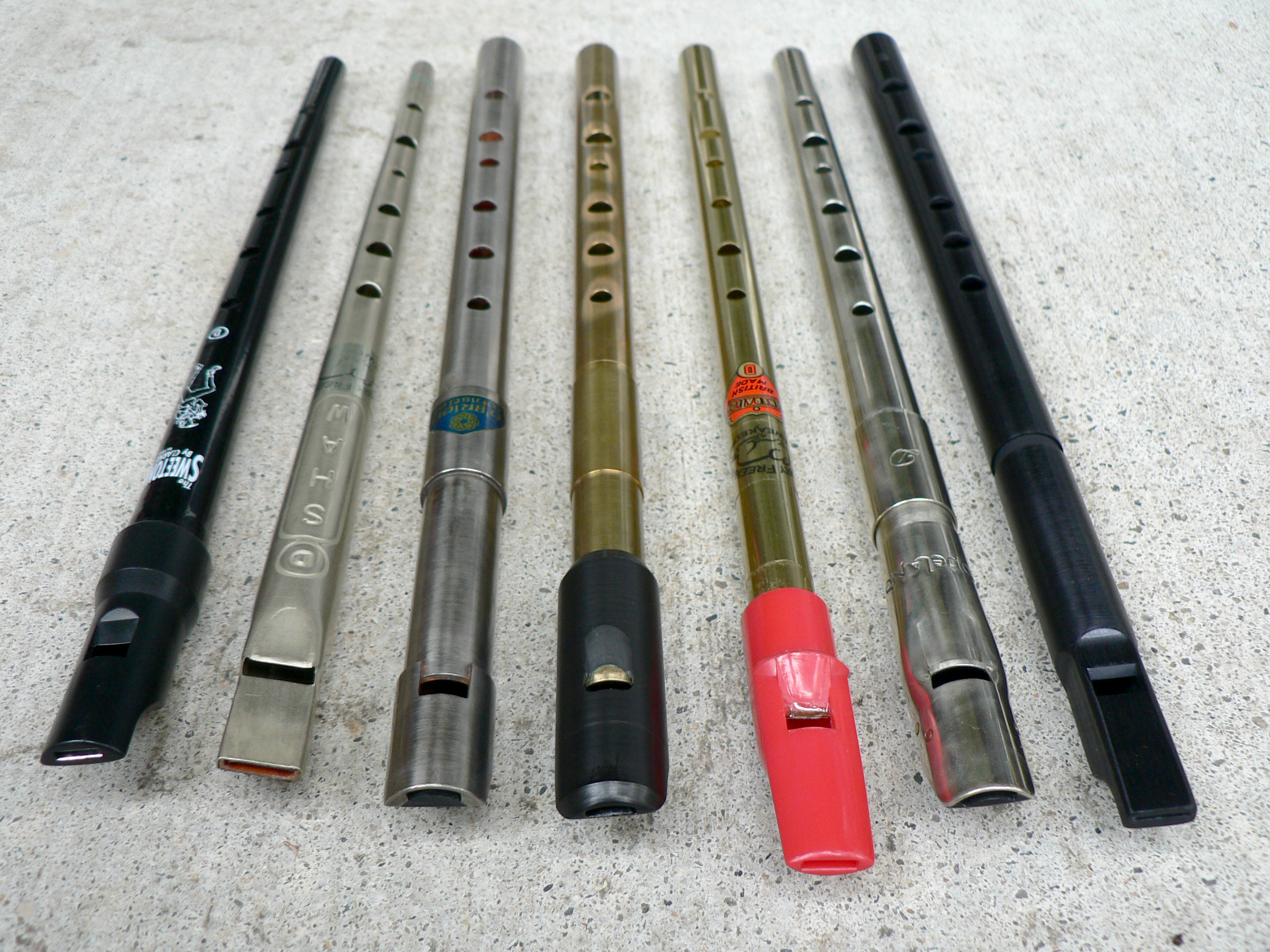
- Several high D tin whistles from left to right: Clarke Sweetone; Shaw (customised); O'Brien; Reyburn; Generation (customised); Copeland; Overton

Woodwind instrument
- Other names: Penny whistle
- Classification: Woodwind; Wind instrument; Aerophone; Simple system flute
- Hornbostel–Sachs classification: 421.221.12 (Open flute with internal duct and fingerholes)

Playing range
- Two octaves

Related instruments
- Irish flute; Pipe and tabor; Fife; Flageolet; Recorder

The tin whistle, also known as the penny whistle, is a simple six-holed woodwind instrument. It is a type of fipple flute, a class of instrument which also includes the recorder and Native American flute. A tin whistle player is called a whistler. The tin whistle is closely associated with Irish traditional music and Celtic music. Other names for the instrument are the flageolet, English flageolet, Scottish penny whistle, tin flageolet, or Irish whistle (also Irish: feadóg stáin or feadóg).

== History ==
The tin whistle in its modern form is from a wider family of fipple flutes which have been seen in many forms and cultures throughout the world. In Europe, such instruments have a long and distinguished history and take various forms, of which the most widely known are the recorder, tin whistle, Flabiol, Txistu and tabor pipe.

=== Predecessors ===
Almost all early cultures had a type of fipple flute, and it is most likely the first pitched flute-type instrument in existence. Examples found to date include a possible Neanderthal fipple flute from Slovenia, which according to some scientists may date from 81,000 to 53,000 BC; a German flute from 35,000 years ago; and a flute, known as the Malham Pipe, made from sheep's bone in West Yorkshire dating to the Iron Age. (A revised dating of the Malham Pipe now places it within the early medieval period.) Written sources that describe a fipple-type flute include the Roman tibia and Greek aulos. In the early Middle Ages, peoples of northern Europe were playing the instrument as seen in 3rd-century British bone flutes, and Irish Brehon Law describes a flute-like instrument. By the 12th century, Italian flutes came in a variety of sizes, and fragments of 12th-century Norman bone whistles have been found in Ireland, as well as an intact 14 cm Tusculum clay whistle from the 14th century in Scotland. In the 17th century, whistles were called flageolets, a term to describe a whistle with a French-made fipple headpiece (common to the modern penny whistle); and such instruments are linked to the development of the English flageolet, French flageolet and recorders of the renaissance and baroque period. The term flageolet is still preferred by some modern tin whistlers, who feel that this better describes the instrument, as the term characterises a wide variety of fipple flutes, including penny whistles.

=== 19th century ===
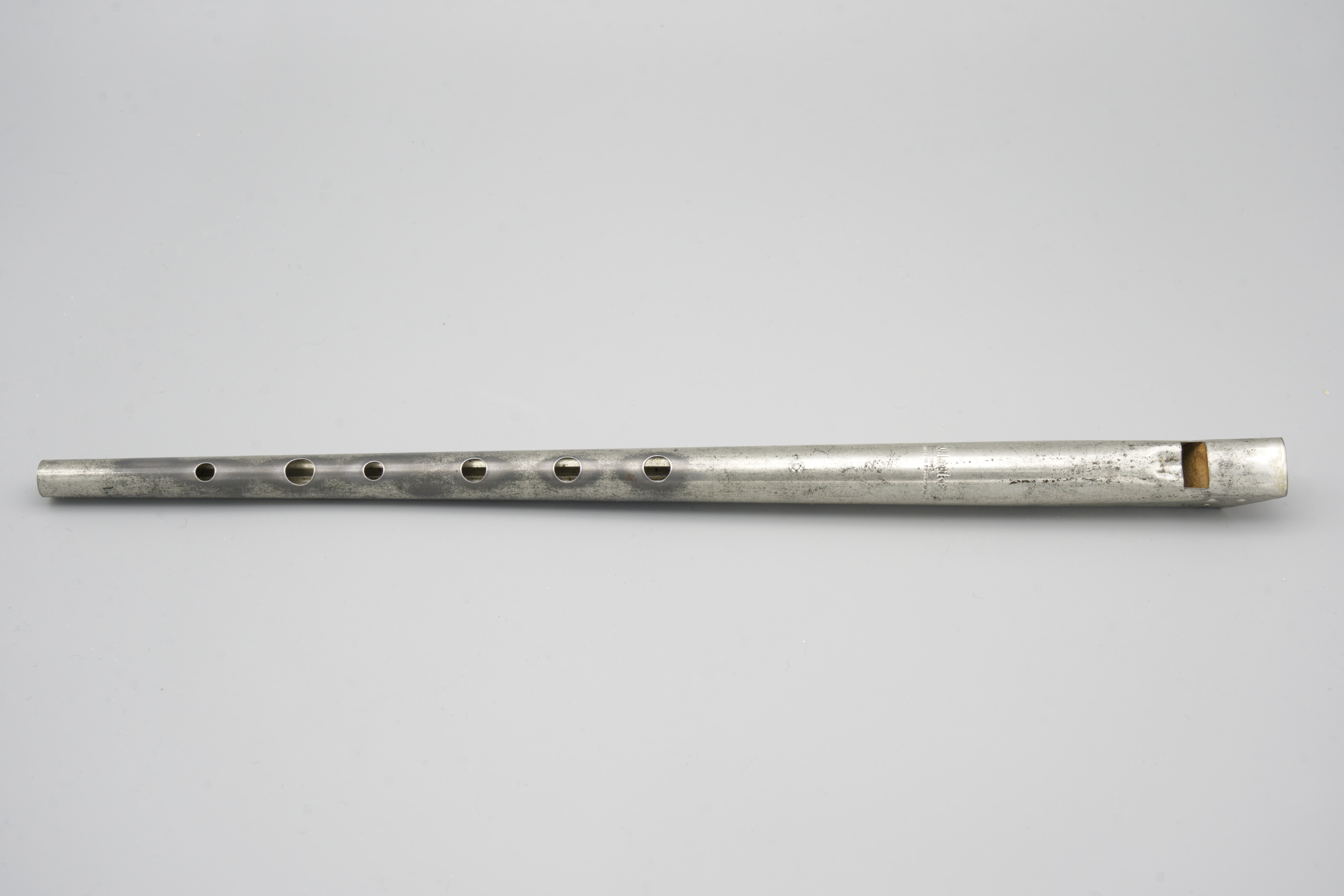
Modern replica of a traditional Clarke tin whistle

The modern penny whistle is indigenous to Great Britain and Ireland, in particular to England, when factory-made "tin whistles" were produced by Robert Clarke from 1840 to 1889 in Manchester, and later New Moston, England. Down to 1900, they were also marketed as "Clarke London Flageolets" or "Clarke Flageolets". The whistle's fingering system is similar to that of the six-hole, "simple system Irish flutes" ("simple" in comparison to Boehm system flutes). The six-hole, diatonic system is also used on baroque flutes, and was of course well-known before Robert Clarke began producing his tin whistles. Clarke's first whistle, the Meg, was pitched in high A (A5), and was later made in other keys suitable for Victorian parlour music. The company showed the whistles in The Great Exhibition of 1851. The Clarke tin whistle is voiced somewhat on an organ-pipe with a flattened tube forming the lip of the fipple mouthpiece, and is usually made from rolled tin sheet or brass. They were mass-produced and widespread due to their relative affordability.

As the penny whistle was generally considered a toy, it has been suggested that children or street musicians were paid a penny by those who heard them playing the whistle. However, in reality, the instrument was so called because it could be purchased for a penny. The name "tin-whistle" was also coined as early as 1825 but neither the tin whistle nor the penny whistle name seems to have been common until the 20th century. (Note: The words "tin whistle" and "pennywhistle" in any compound form do not generally appear in early-20th-century dictionaries, encyclopedias, or thesauri.) The instrument became popular in several musical traditions, namely: English, Scottish, Irish and American traditional music.

Due to its affordability, the tin whistle was a popular household instrument, as ubiquitous as the harmonica. In the second half of the 19th century, some flute manufacturers such as Barnett Samuel and Joseph Wallis also sold whistles. These had cylindrical brass tubes. Like many old whistles, they had lead fipple plugs, and since lead is poisonous, caution should be exercised before playing an old whistle.

==== Low whistle ====
While whistles have most often been produced in higher pitches, the "low" whistle has historically been produced. The Museum of Fine Arts, Boston, in the United States, has in its collection an example of a 19th-century low whistle from the Galpin collection.

=== Modern tin whistle ===
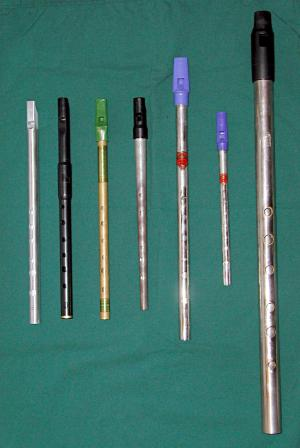
Contemporary tin whistles in several keys

All Plastic Tin Whistle
Sample of music played on all plastic tin whistle in the key of D.

Metal Tin Whistle with Wooden Stop
Sample of music played on key of D metal tin whistle with wooden stop.

Metal Tin Whistle with Plastic Fipple
Sample of music played on key of D metal tin whistle with plastic fipple.

The most common whistles today are made of brass or nickel-plated brass, with a plastic mouthpiece, which contains the fipple. Generation, Feadóg, Oak, Acorn, Soodlum's (now Walton's), and other brands fall in this category.

The Generation Whistle was introduced in 1966, and featured a brass tube with a lead fipple. Founded by businessman and engineer Alfred Brown in Oswestry, Shropshire, their most popular whistle, the Generation Flageolet, was introduced in 1968. The design was updated somewhat over the years, most notably the substitution of a plastic fipple for the lead fipple.

Although most whistles have a cylindrical bore, other designs exist, for example a conical sheet metal whistle with a wooden stop in the wide end to form the fipple, the Clarke's brand being the most prevalent. Other less common variants are the all-metal whistle, the PVC whistle, the Flanna square holed whistle, and the wooden whistle.

Gaining popularity as a folk instrument in the early 19th-century Celtic music revivals, penny whistles now play an integral part in several folk traditions. Whistles are a prevalent starting instrument in English traditional music, Scottish traditional music and Irish traditional music, since they are usually inexpensive; relatively easy to play, free of tricky embouchure such as found with the transverse flute; and use fingerings are nearly identical to those on traditional six-holed flutes, such as the Irish flute and the Baroque flute. The tin whistle is a good starting instrument to learn the uilleann pipes, which has similar finger technique, range of notes and repertoire. The tin whistle is the most popular instrument in Irish traditional music today.

In recent years, a number of instrument builders have started lines of "high-end" hand-made whistles, which can cost dozens of times more than cheap whistles, but nevertheless are cheaper than most other instruments. These companies are typically either a single individual or a very small group of craftsmen who work closely together. The instruments are distinguished from the inexpensive whistles in that each whistle is individually manufactured and "voiced" by a skilled person rather than made in a factory.

== Tuning ==
=== Whistle keys ===
The whistle is tuned diatonically, which allows it to be used to easily play music in every standard mode. The whistle is identified by its lowest note, which is the tonic of the major key. This method of determining the key of the instrument is different from the method used to determine the key of a chromatic instrument, which is based on the relationship between notes on a score and sounded pitch.

Whistles are available in all 12 chromatic keys; however, the most common whistles are pitched in D, followed by whistles in C and F, G, and then B♭ and E♭, with other keys being somewhat rarer. The D whistle can easily play notes in the keys of D and G major. Since the D major key is lower these whistles are identified as D whistles. The next most common whistle tuning is a C whistle, which can easily play notes in the keys of C and F major. The D whistle is by far the most common choice for Irish and Scottish music.

Although the whistle is essentially a diatonic instrument, it is possible to get notes outside the principal major key of the whistle, either by half-holing (partially covering the highest open finger hole) or by cross-fingering (covering some holes while leaving some higher ones open). However, half-holing is somewhat more difficult to do correctly, and whistles are available in all keys, so for other keys a whistler will typically use a different whistle instead, reserving half-holing for accidentals. Some whistle designs allow a single mouthpiece to be used on differently keyed bodies.

==== Low whistle ====
During the 1960s revival of traditional Irish music, the low whistle was "recreated" by Bernard Overton at the request of Finbar Furey.

There are larger whistles which, by virtue of being longer and wider, produce tones an octave (or in rare cases two octaves) lower. Whistles in this category are likely to be made of metal, wood, or plastic tubing, sometimes with a tuning-slide head, and are almost always referred to as low whistles but sometimes called concert whistles. The low whistle operates on identical principles to the standard whistles, but musicians in the tradition may consider it a separate instrument.

The term soprano whistle is sometimes used for higher-pitched whistles when it is necessary to distinguish them from low whistles.

Low whistles are typically hand-made in small workshops by individual makers or small teams. Prominent makers and models include Howard, Burke, MK, Goldie, Tony Dixon, and Carbony Celtric Winds.

== Playing technique ==
=== Fingering and range ===
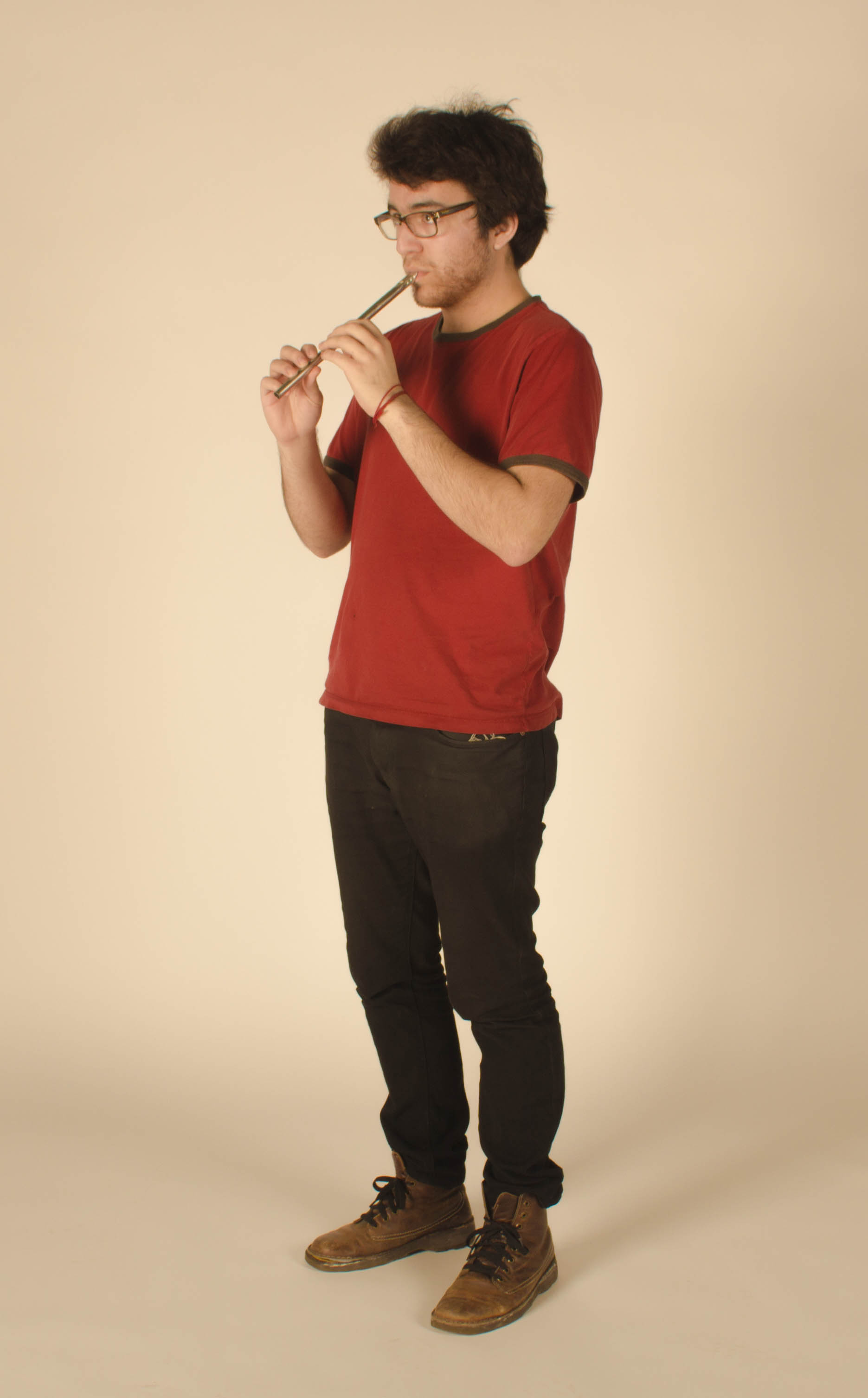
Young man demonstrating the use of a tin whistle

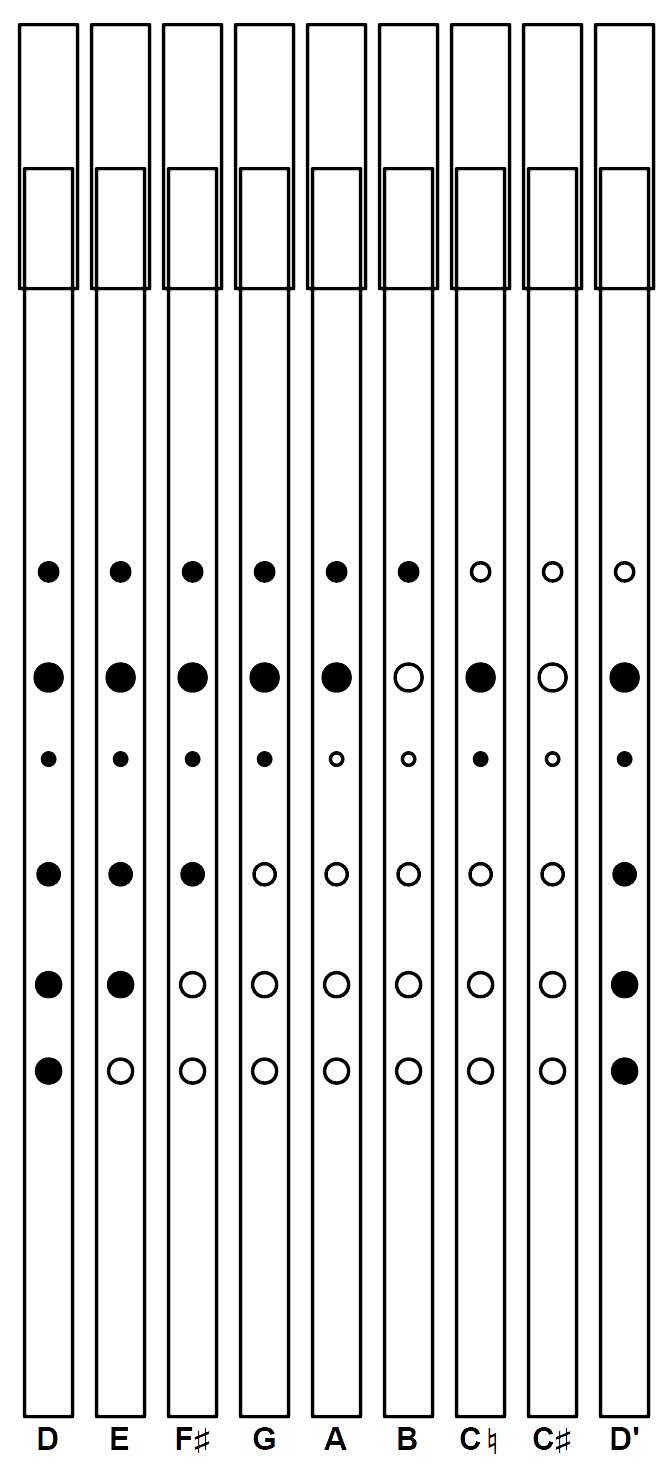
Fingering for the diatonic scale on a D tin whistle: I, II, III, IV, V, VI, ♭VII, ♮VII, I'

The notes are selected by opening or closing holes with the fingers. Holes are typically covered with the pads of the fingers, but some players, particularly when negotiating the larger holes and spacing in low whistles, may employ the "piper's grip". With all the holes closed, the whistle generates its lowest note. This lowest available note is commonly referred to as the whistle's "bell tone". Successively opening holes from the bottom upward produces the rest of the notes of the scale in sequence: with the lowest hole open it generates the second, with the lowest two holes open, it produces the third and so on. With all six holes open, it produces the seventh.

As with a number of woodwind instruments, the tin whistle's second and higher registers are achieved by increasing the air velocity into the ducted flue windway. On a transverse flute this is generally done by narrowing the lip/embouchure. Since the size and direction of the tin whistle's windway is fixed, like that of the recorder or fipple flute, it is necessary to increase the velocity of the air stream. (See overblowing).

Fingering in the second register is generally the same as in the first/fundamental, though alternate fingerings are sometimes employed in the higher end of the registers to correct a flattening effect caused by higher air column velocity. Also, the tonic note of the second register is usually played with the top hole of the whistle partially uncovered instead of covering all holes as with the tonic note of the first register; this makes it harder to accidentally drop into the first register and helps to correct pitch. Recorders perform this by "pinching" open the dorsal thumb hole.

Various other notes (relatively flat or sharp with respect to those of the major scale) can be accessed by cross fingering techniques, and all the notes (except the lowest of each octave/register) can be flattened by half holing. Perhaps the most effective and most used cross fingering is that which produces a flattened form of the seventh note (B♭ instead of B on a C whistle, for example, or C♮ instead of C♯ on a D whistle). This makes available another major scale (F on a C whistle, G on a D whistle).

The standard range of the whistle is two octaves. For a D whistle, this includes notes from D_{5} to D_{7}; that is, from the second D above middle C to the fourth D above middle C. It is possible to make sounds above this range, by blowing with sufficient force, but, in most musical contexts, the result will be loud and out of tune due to a cylindrical bore.

=== Ornamentation ===
Traditional whistle playing uses a number of ornaments to embellish the music, including cuts, strikes and rolls. Most playing is legato with ornaments to create breaks between notes, rather than tongued. The traditional music concept of the word "ornamentation" differs somewhat from that of European classical music in that ornaments are more commonly changes in how a note is articulated rather than the addition of separately-perceived notes to the piece. Common ornaments and articulations include:

Cuts
Cuts are very briefly lifting a finger above the note being sounded without interrupting airflow into the whistle. For example, a player playing a low D on a D whistle can cut the note by very briefly lifting the first finger of their lower hand. This causes the pitch to briefly shift upward. The cut can be performed either at the very start of the note or after the note has begun to sound; some people call the latter a "double cut" or a "mid-note cut".
Strikes
Strikes or taps are similar to cuts except that a finger below the sounded note is briefly lowered to the whistle. For example, if a player is playing a low E on a D whistle the player could tap by quickly lowering and raising their bottom finger. Both cuts and taps are essentially instantaneous; the listener should not perceive them as separate notes.
Rolls
A roll is a note with first a cut and then a strike. Alternatively, a roll can be considered as a group of notes of identical pitch and duration with different articulations. There are two common types of rolls:
- The long roll is a group of three slurred notes of equal pitch and duration, the first sounded without a cut or strike, the second sounded with a cut, and the third sounded with a strike.
- The short roll is a group of two slurred notes of equal pitch and duration, the first sounded with a cut and the second sounded with a strike.
Cranns
Cranns (or crans) are ornaments borrowed from the Uilleann piping tradition. They are similar to rolls except that only cuts are used, not taps or strikes. On the tin whistle they are generally only used for notes where a roll is impossible, such as the lowest note of the instrument.
Slides
Slides are similar to portamentos in classical music; a note below or above (usually below) the intended note is fingered, and then the fingering is gradually shifted in order to smoothly raise or lower the pitch to the intended note. The slide is generally a longer duration ornament than, for example, the cut or the tap and the listener should perceive the pitch changing.
Tonguing
Tonguing is used as a means of emphasizing certain notes, such as the first note in a tune. Some tin whistle players usually do not tongue most notes, but this varies depending on the player and their background. To tongue a note a player briefly touches their tongue to the front of the roof of the mouth at the start of the note (as if articulating a 't'), creating a percussive attack.
Vibrato
Vibrato can be achieved on most notes by opening and closing one of the open holes, or by variation of breath pressure (this last is actually both vibrato (pitch modulation), and tremolo (amplitude modulation)). Of the two, fingered (i.e., true) vibrato is much more common than diaphragmatic (breath) vibrato (i.e., tremolo), except on notes like the lowest note on the whistle where fingered vibrato is much more difficult. A common method of achieving vibrato is to finger a note, and then quickly flick a finger on and off, not the hole below the fingered note, but the hole two below the fingered note, leaving an open hole in between. This technique can be heard on The Chieftains' iconic air, Women of Ireland (Chieftains IV).

=== Some tricks ===
Leading tone
Leading tones are the seventh just before the tonic, so named because melodic styling often uses the seventh to lead into the tonic at the end of a phrase. On most tin whistles the leading tone to the lowest tonic can be played by using the little finger of the lower hand to partially cover the very end opening of the whistle, while keeping all other holes covered as usual for the tonic.
Tone
The tone of the tin whistle is largely determined by its manufacturing. Clarke style rolled metal whistles tend to have an airy "impure" sound, while Generation style cylindrical instruments tend to have clear or "pure" whistle sounds. Inexpensive rolled metal whistles, such as those from Cooperman Fife and Drum (which also produces high-end instruments) may be very airy in sound, and may be difficult to play in the upper register (second octave). Often placing a piece of tape over one edge of the fipple slot (just below the mouthpiece) to narrow the fipple will improve the instrument's tone and playability significantly. Another method of tone improvement on some molded plastic mouthpieces is to lengthen the block with a small piece of poster-putty inserted on the downstream side of the mouthpiece, to lengthen the block and maintain a narrow airstream prior to the fipple's edge.
Scales
While, as mentioned under Fingering, a player will usually play a given instrument only in its tonic key and the key beginning on the fourth (e.g. G on a D whistle), nearly any key is possible, becoming progressively more difficult to keep in tune as the player moves away from the whistle's tonic, according to the circle of fifths. Thus a D whistle is fairly apt for playing both G and A, and a C instrument can be used fairly easily for F and G.

== Repertoire ==
A number of music genres commonly feature the tin whistle.

=== Irish and Scottish music ===
The Old Grey Goose
A jig featuring the tin whistle, performed by Dancing Willow

The Foggy Dew
Instrumental version, featuring low whistle and viola da gamba, performed by Dancing Willow

Traditional music from Ireland and Scotland is by far the most common music to play on the tin whistle, and comprises the vast majority of published scores suitable for whistle players. The tin whistle is very common in Irish music to the point that it could be called characteristic of the genre and fairly common in Scottish music.

=== Kwela ===
Kwela is a genre of music created in South Africa in the 1950s, and is characterized by an upbeat, jazzy tin whistle lead. Kwela is the only music genre created around the sound of the tin whistle. The low cost of the tin whistle, or jive flute, made it an attractive instrument in the impoverished, apartheid-era townships; the Hohner tin whistle was especially popular in kwela performance. The kwela craze accounted for the sale of more than one million tin whistles.

In the late 1950s, mbaqanga music largely superseded kwela in South Africa, and so it followed that the saxophone surpassed the tin whistle as the township people's wind instrument of choice. Kwela master Aaron "Big Voice Jack" Lerole continued to perform into the 1990s; a few bands, such as The Positively Testcard of London, continue to record kwela music.

Kwela sheet music is rarely published, and many of the recordings of founding kwela artists are out of print. One representative compilation is Drum: South African Jazz and Jive.

=== Other music ===
The tin whistle is used in many other types of music, including the Tuk band tradition of Barbados. In some Irish music composed for symphonic ensembles, it is often replaced with piccolo. It is not unusual to hear the tin whistle used in praise music and film soundtracks, notably the soundtrack to Lord of the Rings and Titanic. Published scores suitable for tin whistle performance are available in both of these genres. The tin whistle also appears in "crossover" genres like world music, folk rock, folk metal and folk punk, with the Indian folk metal band Bloodywood in particular making use of the instrument in the song "Ari Ari (Indian Street Metal)".

== Notation ==
Tin whistle music collections are generally notated in one of three different formats.

=== Standard musical notation ===
It is common to score music for the whistle using standard musical notation. The tin whistle is not a transposing instrument—for example, music for the D tin whistle is written in concert pitch, not transposed down a tone as would be normal for transposing instruments. Nevertheless, there is no real consensus on how tin whistle music should be written, or on how reading music onto the whistle should be taught. However, when music is scored for a soprano whistle it will be written an octave lower than it sounds, to spare ledger lines and make it much easier to read.

The traditional music of Ireland and Scotland constitutes the majority of published scores for the whistle. (Note: See, for example, the Open Directory's Tin whistle tune collections or the books published by online stores catering to tin whistle players.) Since the majority of that music is written in D major, G major, or one of the corresponding musical modes, use of the D major or G major key signatures is a de facto standard. For example, the "C whistle" edition of Bill Ochs's popular The Clarke Tin Whistle Handbook is scored in D and differs from the D edition only in that the accompanying audio CD is played on a C whistle.

Reading directly onto the C whistle is popular for the obvious reason that its home key or name key is the all-natural major key (C major). Some musicians are encouraged to learn to read directly onto one whistle, while others are taught to read directly onto another.

The whistle player who wants music to read on to all whistles will need to learn the mechanics of written transposition, taking music with one key signature and rewriting it with another.

Tablature notation for the tin whistle is a graphical representation of which tone holes the player should cover. The most common format is a vertical column of six circles, with holes to be covered for a given note shown filled with black, and a plus sign (+) at the top for notes in the second octave. Tablature is most commonly found in tutorial books for beginners.

=== ABC notation ===
Since the majority of popular tin whistle music is traditional and out of copyright, it is common to share tune collections on the Internet. ABC notation is the most common means of electronic exchange of tunes. It is also designed to be easy to read by people, and many musicians learn to read it directly instead of using a computer program to transform it into a standard musical notation score.

== Well-known performers ==
In Irish traditional music

During the 1960s and beyond, musicians such as John Sheahan and Ciarán Bourke of The Dubliners, and Tommy Makem of The Clancy Brothers and Tommy Makem played the tin whistle (along with several other instruments). These were two of the most influential Irish folk groups of the 20th century, the latter being especially popular during the American folk music revival.

In 1973, Paddy Moloney (of The Chieftains) and Sean Potts released the album Tin Whistles, which helped to popularise the tin whistle in particular, and Irish music in general. Mary Bergin's Feadóga Stáin (1979) and Feadóga Stáin 2 (1993) were similarly influential. Other notable players include Carmel Gunning, Micho Russell, Joanie Madden, Brian Finnegan, Cathal McConnell, and Seán Ryan. Many traditional pipers and flute players also play the whistle to a high standard. Festy Conlon is considered by some to be the best slow air player.

In Scottish traditional music

Award-winning singer and musician Julie Fowlis recorded several tracks on the tin whistle, both in her solo work and with the band Dòchas.

In kwela

Aaron "Big Voice Jack" Lerole and his band recorded a single called "Tom Hark", which sold five million copies worldwide, and which Associated Television used as the theme song for the 1958 television series The Killing Stones. But the most famous star of the kwela era was Spokes Mashiyane. Paul Simon's 1986 album Graceland draws heavily on South African music, and includes pennywhistle solos in the traditional style, played by Morris Goldberg.

In popular music

As a traditional Irish musical instrument, the Irish rock bands The Cranberries and The Pogues (with Spider Stacy as whistler) incorporate the tin whistle in some of their songs, as do such American Celtic punk bands as The Tossers, Dropkick Murphys, and Flogging Molly (in which Bridget Regan plays the instrument). Andrea Corr of Irish folk rock band The Corrs also plays the tin whistle.

Legendary music producer Daniel Lanois credits his musical beginnings on the penny whistle at age nine as a major influence on his melody-first approach to production.

Saxophonist LeRoi Moore, founding member of the American jam band Dave Matthews Band, plays the tin whistle in a few of the band's songs.

Bob Hallett of the Canadian folk rock group Great Big Sea is also a renowned performer of the tin whistle, playing it in arrangements of both traditional and original material.

Icelandic post rock band Sigur Rós concludes their song "Hafsól" with a tin whistle solo.

Barry Privett of the American Celtic rock band Carbon Leaf performs several songs using the tin whistle.

Lambchop uses the tin whistle in the song "The Scary Caroler".

The Unicorns use the tin whistle in the song "Sea Ghost".

The Paul Simon song "You Can Call Me Al" features a penny whistle solo, played by jazz musician Morris Goldberg.

Ian Anderson of Jethro Tull plays a tin whistle on "The Whistler" from the Songs from the Wood album (1977).

Mike Oldfield plays the tin whistle in the first part of "Tubular Bells" (1973).

Rusted Root features the tin whistle, played by band member John Buynak, in its 1994 cult classic hit "Send Me On My Way".

In jazz

Steve Buckley, a British jazz musician is renowned for using the penny whistle as a serious instrument. His whistle playing can be heard on recordings with Loose Tubes, Django Bates and his album with Chris Batchelor Life As We Know It.

Les Lieber is a celebrated American Jazz Tin whistle player. Lieber has played with Paul Whiteman's Band and also with the Benny Goodman Sextet. Lieber made a record with Django Reinhardt in the AFN Studios in Paris in the post Second World War era and started an event called "Jazz at Noon" every Friday in a New York City restaurant playing with a nucleus of advertising men, doctors, lawyers, and business executives who had been or could have been jazz musicians.

Howard Johnson has also been known to play this instrument. Multi-instrumentalist Howard Levy introduces the tune True North with a jazz and very traditionally Celtic-inspired whistle piece on Bela Fleck and the Flecktones' UFO TOFU.

Musician and producer Tyler Duncan (Millish, the olllam, Daren Criss, Vulfpeck, Ella Riot, Lake Street Dive) is known for his incorporation of jazz into traditional Celtic melodies on tin whistle. He was the first Low Whistle player to be accepted into the jazz studies major at the University of Michigan. He plays a custom made chromatic low whistle designed for Jazz. Duncan's modern big band arrangement of The May Morning Dew was featured on NPR's Jazz Set and showcases him on tin whistle as lead instrumentalist.

In film and video game music

Howard Shore called for a tin whistle in D for a passage in his "Concerning Hobbits" from The Lord of the Rings film trilogy. The tin whistle symbolizes the Shire, together with other instruments such as the guitar, the double bass, and the bodhrán. The tin whistle also plays a passage in the main theme in the same trilogy.

The tin whistle is featured prominently in the song "My Heart Will Go On" by Celine Dion in the movie Titanic. The song's introduction consists of a tin whistle solo which has become iconic.

The tin whistle also features prominently in the soundtrack of the film How to Train Your Dragon, and is connected to the main character, Hiccup.

The tin whistle is heard at the start of the 1984 short film The Adventures of Andre and Wally B

The tin whistle is featured in the winning song of the 2013 Eurovision Song Contest "Only Teardrops" by Emmelie de Forest.

The tin whistle is featured in Mario Kart 8's track Wild Woods of the DLC Pack, Animal Crossing × Mario Kart 8.

== See also ==
- Fife – Woodwind musical instrument
- List of tin whistle players
