= De Dannan =

Irish folk music group

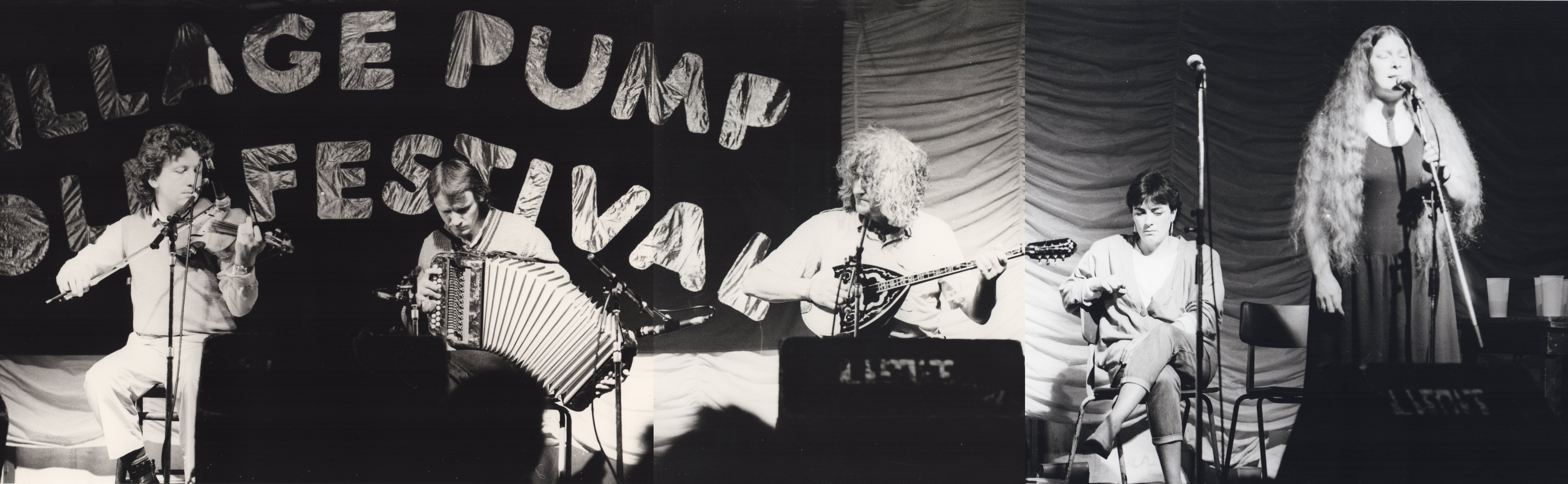
- De Dannan, featuring two of their noted female singers at the 1985 Trowbridge Folk Festival. L-R: Frankie Gavin; Martin O'Connor; Alec Finn; Mary Black and Dolores Keane.

Background information
- Origin: Galway, Ireland
- Genres: Folk; Celtic
- Years active: 1975–2003
- Labels: Polydor, Gael-Linn, Shanachie
- Spinoffs: Frankie Gavin with Hibernian Rhapsody a.k.a. Frankie Gavin & The New De Dannan
- Past members: Alec Finn; Johnny "Ringo" McDonagh; Charlie Piggott; Mickey Finn; Dolores Keane; Andy Irvine; Johnny Moynihan; Tim Lyons; Jackie Daly; Maura O'Connell; Mary Black; Martin O'Connor; Aidan Coffey; Eleanor Shanley; Colm Murphy; Tommy Fleming; Derek Hickey; Andrew Murray

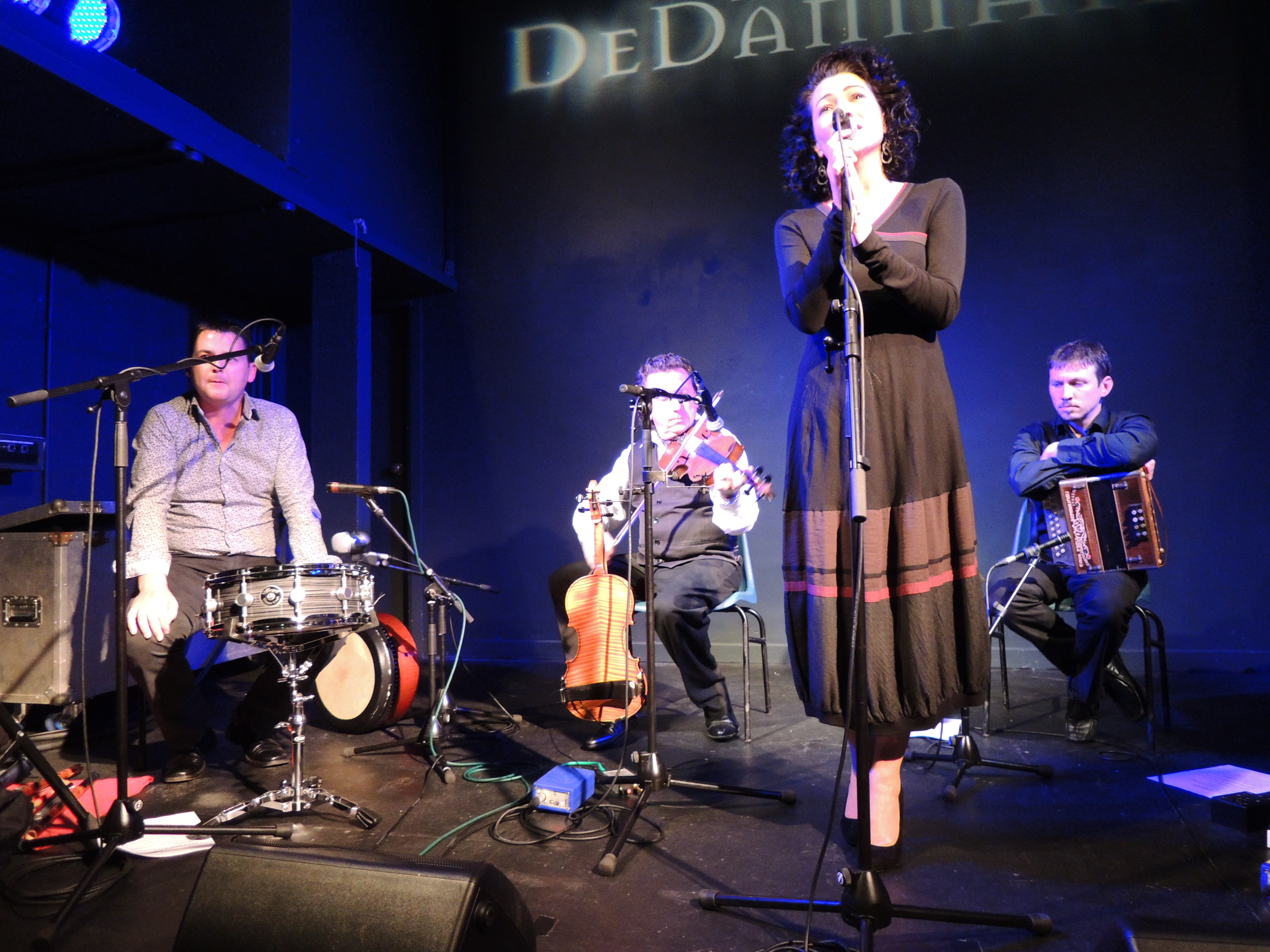
Frankie Gavin and the new De Dannan at the "Craiceann Bodhrán Festival" 2012

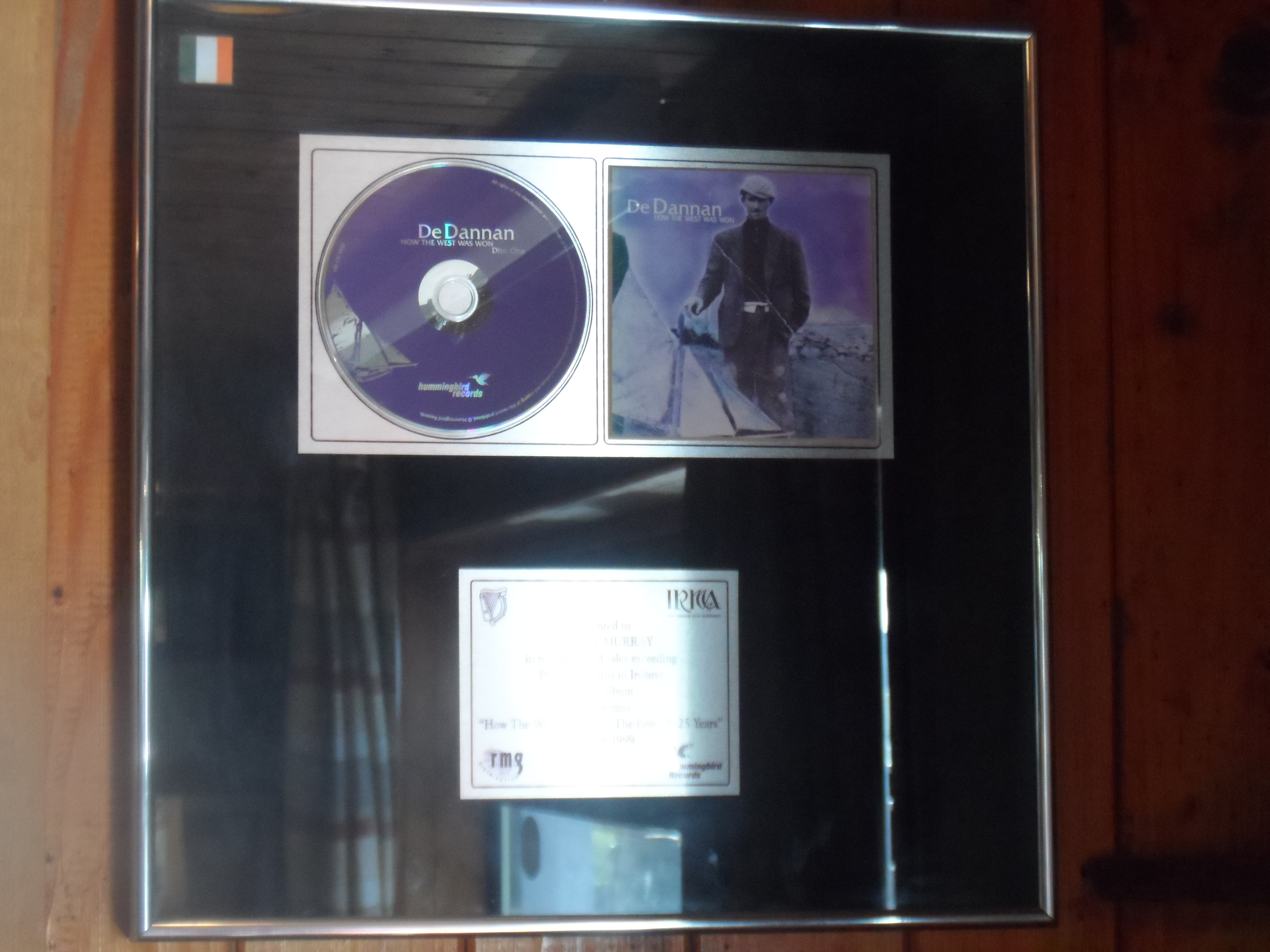
Platinum record awarded to De Dannan by the Irish Recorded Music Association for their 1999 album How the West Was Won. In Ireland, a recording must sell 15,000 units to be certified platinum.

De Dannan (originally Dé Danann) are an Irish folk music group. It was formed in 1975 by Frankie Gavin (fiddle), Alec Finn (guitar, bouzouki), Johnny "Ringo" McDonagh (bodhrán) and Charlie Piggott (banjo) as a result of sessions in Hughes's Pub in Spiddal, County Galway, Ireland, with Dolores Keane (vocals) subsequently being invited to join the band. The fiddler Mickey Finn (1951–1987) is also acknowledged to have been a founding member.

The band was named after the legendary Irish tribe Tuatha Dé Danann. In 1985, the spelling of the name was changed from "Dé Danann" to "De Dannan" for reasons that have never been made clear. Since 2010, however, Finn and McDonagh have recorded and performed with a line-up named "De Danann", and, since 2012, Gavin has recorded and performed with another line-up named "De Dannan".

== History ==
The group's debut album was Dé Danann, produced by Dónal Lunny and recorded at Eamonn Andrews Studios, Dublin, in 1975 and released on Polydor Records. In early 1976, Keane left to marry multi-instrumentalist John Faulkner, with whom she subsequently recorded three albums of folk music.

To fill the vacancy left after Keane's departure, Dé Danann brought in Andy Irvine. Irvine never recorded on any full De Danann album but he can be heard on three tracks recorded with the band on 30 April 1976, during a folk festival in Germany. Irvine left soon thereafter because of scheduling conflicts but proposed as his replacement Johnny Moynihan, who participated in the recording of the band's second album, Selected Jigs Reels & Songs. This album featured a bodhrán solo by McDonagh on "Over The Bog Road" but the album has never been released on CD, reportedly because the master tapes were lost.

Moynihan left in 1978, being replaced by singer and accordion player Tim Lyons; for a short period in 1978, the band toured as a six-piece featuring both Moynihan and Lyons.

Their third album, The Mist Covered Mountain, was released in 1980 and featured various older traditional singers. That year, the group had a surprise hit single in Ireland with their instrumental cover of the Beatles' song "Hey Jude", later re-released on their fourth album, Star-Spangled Molly in 1981; on this album, they were joined by Maura O'Connell.

As an indication of their diversity, they also recorded Handel's "Arrival of the Queen of Sheba", which they jokingly retitled "The Arrival of the Queen of Sheba (in Galway)", on their 1983 album Song for Ireland. Later, they would also record Bohemian Rhapsody and Jewish klezmer tunes, learned from bluegrass and klezmer musician, Andy Statman.

When O'Connell left the band, they brought in Mary Black for two albums: Song for Ireland and Anthem. Like O'Connell and Keane before her, Black subsequently went on to explore country, blues and jazz, hopping backwards and forwards between Nashville and Dublin.

After Black's departure, Keane returned to the fold for two albums: Anthem and Ballroom. Other singers with the group have included Eleanor Shanley (1988–1992), Tommy Fleming (1994–1997) and Andrew Murray (1997–2000).

On the instrumental side, Frankie Gavin and Alec Finn were the only constant members of the group. Jackie Daly (accordion) is a star in his own right and later went on to join the group Patrick Street. He was replaced on accordion in 1983 by Martin O'Connor until 1987, Aidan Coffey until 1995, and Derek Hickey until 2001. The fiddle-accordion-bouzouki combination became synonymous with the inspirational De Dannan instrumental sound. In 1988 Colm Murphy replaced Johnny McDonagh playing the bodhrán.

The band members went their separate ways in 2003, at which point the name De Dannan was copyrighted by Alec Finn. This led to a high-profile dispute with Frankie Gavin in 2009 when the latter used the name for his pre-existing Hibernian Rhapsody band.

In 2008, the original band (Johnny "Ringo" McDonagh, Charlie Piggott, Dolores Keane, Frankie Gavin and Alec Finn) were commemorated on an Irish 55c postage stamp. Attending the formal issue event, Piggott said, "Having contributed to the promotion of Traditional Irish Music and as a keen philatelist, I consider it both an honour and a privilege to be celebrated on an Irish stamp."

In 2010, De Danann [sic] recorded Wonderwaltz, an album with a line-up of Finn (guitar, bouzouki, tenor guitar, mandola, mouth organ), McDonagh (bodhrán, bones), Eleanor Shanley (vocals), Brian McGrath (banjo, piano, tenor guitar, mandola), Derek Hickey (accordion) and Mick Conneely (fiddle, viola, whistle), with guest musicians Cian Finn (backing vocals) and Trevor Hutchinson (double bass).

== Discography ==
- De Danann (1975) Polydor
- Selected Jigs Reels and Songs (1976)
- The 3rd Irish Folk Festival in Concert (1977)
- The Mist Covered Mountain (1980)
- Star-Spangled Molly (1981) (see The De Dannan Collection)
- Best of De Dannan (1981)
- Song For Ireland (1983)
- The Irish RM (1984)
- Anthem (1985)
- Ballroom (1987)
- A Jacket of Batteries (1988)
- Half Set in Harlem (1991)
- Hibernian Rhapsody (1995)
- World Tour (studio and live recordings, 1996)
- De Dannan – How the West Was Won (1999)
- De Dannan's Welcome to the Hotel Connemara (2000)
- De Danann – Wonderwaltz (2010)
