= Abocurragh =

Studio album by Andy Irvine
- Released: 27 August 2010
- Recorded: February 2009 – April 2010, in Dublin, Norway, Australia, Hungary and Brittany
- Genre: Irish folk music
- Length: 56:52
- Label: Andy Irvine (Ireland)
- Producer: Dónal Lunny

Andy Irvine chronology
Way Out Yonder (2000)	Abocurragh (2010)	Parachilna (2013)

Abocurragh is an album by Andy Irvine recorded in Dublin, Norway, Australia, Hungary and Brittany between February 2009 and April 2010. It was produced by Dónal Lunny who also plays on all the tracks, except the last one.

== Recording ==
With the first two tracks, Irvine, Lunny and O'Flynn re-kindle the distinctive Planxty sound, beginning with "Three Huntsmen", a song (about a sinister murder) that Irvine learnt from Johnny Moynihan in the early sixties. It first appeared on Sweeney's Men's eponymous album under the name "Johnston" and set to a different tune from this recording, written by Irvine. This song is entry H185 in Sam Henry's Songs of the People but with a happy ending omitted here.

"Willy of Winsbury" is Irvine's re-recording of "Willy O' Winsbury", also from Sweeney's Men's first album, where he sang it accompanying himself on guitar. This time round, he re-arranged the accompaniment for mandola, played alongside a much fuller sound contributed by Lunny (guitar and keyboards) and O'Flynn (uilleann pipes and low whistle). This song is #100 from the Child Ballads and is also printed as entry H221 in Sam Henry's collection (under the names "The Rich Ship Owner's Daughter" and "John Barbour", among others).

"Emptyhanded" is a modern song by George Papavgeris, about convicts and early immigrants in Australia defaulting on their bank loans and losing their land.

The album continues with "The Close Shave/East at Glendart", "James Magee/Isambard's Lament", "The Girl From Cushendun/The Love Of My Life", "The Spirit of Mother Jones", "Victory at Lawrence", "The Demon Lover". As if it were a concert, the album closes with two encores: "Banks of Newfoundland" and "Oslo/Norwegian Mazurka".

== Track listing ==
All tracks composed by Andy Irvine; except where noted.

1. "Three Huntsmen" – 4:10
2. "Willy of Winsbury" – 6:23
3. "Emptyhanded" (George Papavgeris) – 5:10
4. "The Close Shave"/"East at Glendart" (Bob Bickerton / Traditional; arranged by Máirtin O'Connor, Dónal Lunny and Andy Irvine) – 4:12
5. "James Magee"/"Isambard's Lament" (Traditional; arranged by Andy Irvine / Bruce Molsky) – 4:57
6. "The Girl from Cushendun"/"The Love of My Life" – 4:06
7. "The Spirit of Mother Jones" – 4:02
8. "Victory at Lawrence" – 6:49 ky
9. "The Demon Lover" (Traditional; arranged by Andy Irvine, Dónal Lunny, Nikola Parov and Jac Molard) – 6:21
10. "Banks of Newfoundland" – 5:33
11. "Oslo/Norwegian Mazurka" (Andy Irvine / Traditional; arranged by A. Lien and L. Nielsen) – 4:48

== Personnel ==
- Andy Irvine - vocals, bouzouki, mandola, harmonica
- Dónal Lunny - guitar, keyboard, bouzouki, bass bouzouki, orchestral drum, percussion
- Liam O'Flynn - Uilleann pipes, tin whistle
- Nikola Parov - Kaval, nyckelharpa
- Máirtín O'Connor - accordion
- Bruce Molsky - fiddle
- Rens van der Zalm - fiddle
- Rick Epping - harmonica
- Paul Moore - double bass
- Graham Henderson - keyboards
- Liam Bradley - percussion
- Jacky Molard - violas, violins, string arrangement
- Annbjørg Lien - Hardanger fiddles
- Lillebjørn Nilsen - guitar
- Kate Burke and Ruth Hazleton - backing vocals

Produced by Dónal Lunny.
Engineered by Leon O'Neill assisted by Ross Martin, at Westland Studios, Dublin.
Mixed by Dónal Lunny and Tim Martin, at Windmill Lane Studios, Dublin.
Remixed and Mastered by Tim Martin at Long Beard Sound, Dublin.

Kate Burke and Ruth Hazleton's backing vocals were recorded in Melbourne.
Nikola Parov's kaval and nyckelharpa were recorded in Budapest.
Jacky Molard's string arrangement was recorded at his studio in Brittany.
Annebjørg Lien and Lillebjørn Nilsen recorded at Kongshavn Studios, Kristiansand, Norway; engineered by Roald Råsberg.
