= Changing Trains =

Studio album by Andy Irvine & Dónal Lunny's Mozaik
- Released: 2008
- Recorded: November 2005, at TOM-TOM Studios in Budapest
- Genre: Irish / Southeastern European / Balkan / Old-timey folk music
- Length: 51:49
- Label: Issued under license to Compass Records
- Producer: Dónal Lunny

Andy Irvine & Dónal Lunny's Mozaik chronology
Live from the Powerhouse (2004)	Changing Trains (2008)	Andy Irvine/70th Birthday Concert at Vicar St 2012 (2014)

Changing Trains is the first studio album recorded by Mozaik in Budapest during November 2005, and for which they had rehearsed new material a few months earlier, in January and April.

The album was initially released by the band in Australia in 2006 and, after additional re-mixing by Dónal Lunny at Longbeard Studios in Dublin, was re-released in the autumn of 2007 under license to Compass Records.

== Recording ==
The album opens with "O'Donoghue's", written and sung by Andy Irvine reminiscing about his early days in Dublin, when he first started frequenting this pub in August 1962. In eleven verses, he vividly recalls these happy times, naming many of the people who were part of his transition from actor to musician, leading to his touring days with Sweeney's Men and up to his departure "for the Pirin Mountains" in the late summer of 1968. On this first track, Liam O'Flynn joins Mozaik on whistle.

Then comes the band's arrangement of "Sail Away Ladies/Walking in the Parlor", two old-timey tunes, the first recorded by Uncle Bunt Stephens, a Tennessee fiddler, in 1925 and the second by Dr D. Dix Hollis in Alabama, the same year.

"The Wind Blows over the Danube" is a slow and mournful song, written and sung by Irvine, about a love affair in Hungary.

"Reuben's Transatlantic Express", sung by Molsky, is Mozaik's arrangement of "Reuben's Train", with the inclusion of short segments of Romanian traditional tunes played between verses. The whole piece is performed at an accelerating pace and ends with a Romanian tune repeated in increasingly higher keys, thus further accentuating the aural effect of a runaway train gaining speed.

"The Humours of Parov" was composed by Lunny in honour of bandmate Nikola Parov, to celebrate the distinction between the Bulgarian 'daychovo' (or 'daichevo') rhythm in 9/8 time [2–2–2–3] and the Irish slip jig, which is in a different form of 9/8 time [3–3–3]. Lunny also included a hybrid of these two rhythms he called 'slippy-daichevo' [3–2–2–2], which turns the daichevo rhythm around by playing the long beat first, to prepare for the slip jig that follows. O'Flynn also contributed uilleann pipes on this track.

"The Ballad of Reynardine/Johnny Cúig" is a two-part piece arranged by Irvine. First, "The Ballad of Reynardine" is the old Irish ballad from County Tyrone which Irvine has set to the vigorous pace of the 'paidushka' rhythm (5/8); second, "Johnny Cúig" is Irvine's re-interpretation of "Johnny Cope" (the hornpipe he recorded with Planxty on Cold Blow and the Rainy Night) from which he selected some of the parts and reset them to 5/8 also, 'cúig' meaning 'five' in Irish.

For "Mary Rogers/Siún Ní Dhuibhir", with O'Flynn again on uilleann pipes, Lunny wrote the first part in memory of his mother, as this was her maiden name; he also sings "Siún Ní Dhuibhir", an Irish name which translates as 'Joan O'Dwyer'.

"Train on the Island/Big Hoedown", begins with Molsky singing a beautifully plaintive song of separation ("Me and my gal, we fell out, it might be for the best") originating from Virginia, followed by a lively hoedown, an old-fashioned country dance from West Virginia.

"The Pigfarm Suite" comprises two pieces: first, a slow tune in 9/8 time that the Bulgarian tradition calls an "old-man's dance"; second, a new version of Irvine's "Paidushko horo" in 5/8 (see the album Rainy Sundays... Windy Dreams from 1980), performed this time with an authentic Bulgarian traditional feel and arrangement.

Finally, "Nights in Carrowclare" is another of the many songs Irvine learnt from Eddie Butcher. This one is a heartbreaking song of emigration to America, in which the lad leaves his girl behind. It was written in about 1870 by James McCurry, a blind fiddler from Myroe and it is listed under entry H169 in Sam Henry's collection, where it was recorded under the title of "The Maid of Carrowclare". Irvine's decorative accompaniment on mandolin provides beautiful harmonies to this song.

== Track listing ==
1. "O'Donoghue's" (Andy Irvine) – 4:55
2. "Sail Away Ladies" (Bunt Stephens) / "Walking in the Parlor" (Dr D. Dix Hollis) – 3:23
3. "The Wind Blows over the Danube" (Andy Irvine) – 6:22
4. "Reuben's Transatlantic Express" (Trad. Arr. Irvine/Lunny/Molsky/Parov/van der Zalm) – 5:20
5. "The Humours of Parov" (Dónal Lunny) – 5:55
6. "The Ballad of Reynardine"/"Johnny Cúig" (Trad. Arr. Irvine/Lunny/Molsky/Parov/van der Zalm) – 4:48
7. "Mary Rogers"/"Siún Ní Dhuibhir" (Dónal Lunny) – 4:52
8. "Train on the Island"/"Big Hoedown" (Trad. Arr. Irvine/Lunny/Molsky/Parov/van der Zalm) – 4:32
9. "The Pigfarm Suite" (Trad. Arr. Irvine/Lunny/Molsky/Parov/van der Zalm) – 6:25
10. "Nights in Carrowclare" (Trad. Arr. Irvine/Lunny/Molsky/Parov/van der Zalm) – 4:52

== Personnel ==
- Andy Irvine - vocals, bouzouki, mandola, harmonica.
- Dónal Lunny - backing vocals, bouzouki, guitar, bodhrán.
- Bruce Molsky - vocals, fiddle, guitar, 5-string banjo.
- Nikola Parov - gadulka, gaida, kaval, tin whistle, nyckelharpa, percussion.
- Rens van der Zalm - fiddle, guitar, mandolin, oud, low whistle.

Special guest:

- Liam O'Flynn - uilleann pipes, tin whistle.
