= Live from the Powerhouse =

Live album by Andy Irvine & Dónal Lunny's Mozaik
- Released: 2004
- Recorded: 30/31 March 2002, at the Brisbane Powerhouse
- Genre: Irish / Southeastern European / Balkan / Old-timey folk music
- Length: 61:47
- Label: Issued under license to Compass Records
- Producer: Dónal Lunny

Andy Irvine & Dónal Lunny's Mozaik chronology
Live from the Powerhouse (2004)	Changing Trains (2008)

Live from the Powerhouse is an album rehearsed in six days, starting on 1 March 2002 in the seaside town of Rye, Victoria in Australia, by multicultural group Mozaik featuring Andy Irvine, Dónal Lunny, Bruce Molsky, Nikola Parov and Rens van der Zalm.

The Australian tour that followed culminated in two gigs recorded at the Brisbane Powerhouse on 30/31 March 2002 and the resulting album was eventually released in 2004, under license to Compass Records.

== Recording ==
The album opens with "My Heart's Tonight in Ireland", the band's re-working of the song that Irvine recorded solo on his album Rain on the Roof in 1996; the song then segues into "Robinson County/The Trip to Durrow", two tunes in 4/4 time where Molsky and van der Zalm on fiddles combine American old-timey style and Irish traditional music.

"Suleiman's Kopanitsa" is an adaptation of "Dance of Suleiman", recorded by Irvine on the album East Wind, where Davy Spillane's uilleann pipes played the main melodies with sustains, vibrato and occasional grace notes. This time round, though, all the melodic phrases are re-worked for string instruments emphasising the 11/16 kopanitsa rhythm (2–2–3–2–2) with exquisitely crafted counter-harmonies from Irvine (mandola), van der Zalm (mandolin) and Lunny (bouzouki), augmented by Parov (gadulka and kaval) and Molsky (fiddle).

"The Rocky Road to Dublin" is the American old-timey version first recorded in the 1920s by Allen Sisson and "Indian Ate the Woodchuck" comes from the American old-timey fiddler Ed Haley.

"Romanian Horă" is a fiddle tune learnt from Jacky Molard and played by van der Zalm, followed by Molsky adding "Black Jack Grove" and its Blueridge mountains feel.

"Sandansko Oro" is a slow Macedonian tune in 22/16 time and is followed by "Menchin Kamen" in slow 18/16 time (also from the album East Wind), sung here by Irvine.

"Pony Boy" is a fiddle duet played by Molsky and van der Zalm to set the stage for "Never Tire of the Road", Irvine's tribute to his long-standing hero Woody Guthrie. In this rendition, Irvine adds Guthrie's chorus: "All of you fascists bound to lose".

"A Blacksmith Courted Me" is the band's version of Irvine's "The Blacksmith" (with Molsky on 5-string banjo) followed, as usual, by "Blacksmithereens", a tune in 5/8 time that Irvine wrote following his first impressions of Balkan music in 1968.

Molsky starts "Field Holler Medley" by singing an American field call, followed by a couple of old West Virginia tunes: "Piney Woods" and "Lost Indian".

"Băneasă's Green Glade" is a song Irvine wrote while camping near a zoo in Bucharest in the late 1960s. It segues into "Roumen Sirakov's Daichevo", a Bulgarian dance tune in 9/16 time.

The band then launch into their arrangement of "Smeseno Horo" ("broken dance"), which Irvine first recorded with Planxty on After The Break and then again with Davy Spillane and Bill Whelan on the album East Wind. It is in mixed Bulgarian rhythms, beginning in 15/16 time (8/16 + 7/16) and 11/16, then continuing in two different 9/16 rhythms.

The album closes with "The Last Dance", a Greek tune "that the bride dances at her wedding, bidding farewell to her girlhood". Parov leads the band on clarinet, playing it in the Epirus style.

== Track listing ==
1. "My Heart's Tonight in Ireland" (Andy Irvine) / "Robinson County"/"The trip to Durrow" (Trad. Arr. Irvine / Lunny / Molsky / Parov / van der Zalm) – 6:17
2. "Suleman's Kopanitsa" (Trad. Arr. Irvine / Lunny / Molsky / Parov / van der Zalm) – 4:45
3. "The Rocky Road to Dublin" (Trad. Arr. Irvine / Lunny / Molsky / Parov / van der Zalm) / "Indian Ate the Woodchuck" (Ed Haley / John Hartford Music) – 4:05
4. "Romanian Horă" / "Black Jack Grove" (Trad. Arr. Irvine / Lunny / Molsky / Parov / van der Zalm) – 5:20
5. "Sandansko Oro" / "Mechkin Kamen" (Trad. Arr. Irvine / Lunny / Molsky / Parov / van der Zalm) – 5:46
6. "Pony Boy" (Mark Simos / Devachan Music BMI) / "Never Tire of the Road" (Andy Irvine) – 7:21
7. "A Blacksmith Courted Me" (Trad. Arr. Irvine / Lunny / Molsky / Parov / van der Zalm) / "Blacksmithereens" (Andy Irvine) – 4:51
8. "Field Holler Medley" (Trad. Arr. Irvine / Lunny / Molsky / Parov / van der Zalm) – 5:58
9. "Băneasă's Green Glade" (A. Irvine) / "Roumen Sirakov's Daichevo" (Trad. Arr. Irvine / Lunny / Molsky / Parov / van der Zalm) – 7:28
10. "Smeseno Horo" (Trad. Arr. Irvine / Lunny / Molsky / Parov / van der Zalm) – 3:13
11. "The Last Dance" (Trad. Arr. Irvine / Lunny / Molsky / Parov / van der Zalm) – 6:43

== Personnel ==
- Andy Irvine - vocals, bouzouki, mandolin, mandola, harmonica.
- Dónal Lunny - backing vocals, bouzouki, guitar, bodhrán.
- Bruce Molsky - vocals, fiddle, 5-string banjo.
- Nikola Parov - gadulka, gaida, kaval, tin whistle, clarinet, guitar, kalimba
- Rens van der Zalm - backing vocals, fiddle, mandolin, guitar.
