= Willie o Winsbury =

Traditional song

Willie O Winsbury (Child 100, Roud 64) is a traditional English-language folk ballad. The song, of which there are many variants, is a traditional Scottish ballad that dates from at least 1775, and is known under several other names, including "Johnnie Barbour" and "Lord Thomas of Winesberry".

== Synopsis ==
A king is away for some time. His daughter becomes pregnant. On his return the king threatens to hang the father. On meeting him he is struck by his beauty and offers him his daughter's hand, gold, and land. Willie agrees to marry the king's daughter but declares the gold and the land to be hers, not his own.

This ballad closely parallels Child ballad 99, "Johnie Scot".

In one variant, the lands are specifically described: he will be king when he returns to Scotland. It may, in fact, be based on James V's courtship of and marriage to Madeleine de Valois of France; James came to see the woman he was betrothed to in disguise, and went on to meet the princess, who fell in love with him.

Thomas and his brother or possibly son William, both of Winsbury in Shropshire, were given protection for being in Scotland in November 1336. Winsbury is a small town of 1 square mile just to the west of Chirbury. It was the base of the Winsbury family in the 13th and 14th centuries. Thomas was a mid-level official in the service of Shropshire and the English central authorities. There is only one place named Winsbury.

For details of the lives of Thomas and William see: John Davies and David Read 'The Careers of Thomas 'The Elder' and Thomas 'the Younger' of Winsbury, Shropshire. Shropshire History and Archaeology. Vol.99. 2024 pp 39-46 Annex. Thomas and William, c.1290-c.1340 of Winsbury were in Scotland when these popular ballads were being composed. If there is a connection the exiled king would have been David II who was in France from 1333 to 1341, however he had no children.

The song is often sung to the tune of "Fause Foodrage."

== Recordings ==
Andy Irvine sang "Willy O'Winsbury" on Sweeney's Men's eponymous debut album in 1968, accompanying himself on guitar. The recording featured the tune of "Fause Foodrage" (Child 89), which is now commonly used for "Willie O' Winsbury". On the album's sleeve notes, band member Johnny Moynihan wrote, "A ballad for which Andy is renowned. He got the text from Child's 'English and Scottish Ballads'; looking up the tune he got his numbers confused and emerged with the wrong air. By chance it suited the song very well". In 2010, Irvine re-recorded the song with a fuller arrangement of the same tune for his album Abocurragh, adding: "This is Child 100. I collected the words from different versions and as the story goes, on looking up the tune, I lighted on the tune to number 101. I'm not sure if this is true but it's a good story".

Being a well-documented song and publicised by English Folk Dance and Song Society, The Broadside Ballads Project, and Mainly Norfolk, the song was recorded by Jon Boden and Oli Steadman for inclusion in their respective lists of daily folk songs "A Folk Song a Day" and "365 Days Of Folk".

The song "Farewell, Farewell", recorded by Fairport Convention on their album Liege and Lief in 1969, is an adaptation featuring new lyrics by Richard Thompson. A recording of "Willie O' Winsbury" played and sung by Thompson was included in the 2006 boxset RT - The Life and Music of Richard Thompson.

Following is a list of notable recordings of the ballad including, for each entry, the year of release, artist, song title, and album title:

Year	Artist	Title	Album
1968	Sweeney's Men	"Willy O' Winsbury"	Sweeney's Men
1969	Fairport Convention	"Farewell, Farewell"	Liege & Lief
1971	Anne Briggs with Johnny Moynihan	"Willie O' Winsbury"	Anne Briggs
1971	Tony Capstick	"Sir Thomas of Winesberry"	His Round
1971	John Renbourn	"Willy O' Winsbury"	Faro Annie
1972	Pentangle	"Willy O' Winsbury"	Solomon's Seal
1972	Barbara Dickson	"Lord Thomas Of Winesberry and The King's Daughter"	From the Beggar's Mantle...Fringed with Gold
1975	Robert Cinnamond	"The Rich Shipowner's Daughter"	You Rambling Boys of Pleasure
1978	Dick Gaughan	"Willie O' Winsbury"	Gaughan
1994	Connie Dover	"Willie of Winsbury"	The Wishing Well
1999	Frankie Armstrong	"Thomas of Welshbury"	The Garden of Love
2001	Nic Jones	"William of Winesbury"	Unearthed
2004	Great Big Sea	"John Barbour"	Something Beautiful
2006	Richard Thompson	"Willy O' Winsbury"	RT - The Life and Music of Richard Thompson
2007	Meg Baird	"Willy of Winsbury"	Dear Companion
2007	Kate Rusby	"John Barbury"	Awkward Annie
2007	Joel Frederiksen	"Willie O' Winsbury"	The Elfin Knight
2009	Nathan Rogers	"Willie O' Winsbury"	The Gauntlet
2010	Andy Irvine	"Willy of Winsbury"	Abocurragh
2010	The Owl Service	"Willie O' Winsbury"	The View From a Hill
2013	Snorri Helgason	"Willie O' Winsbury"	Autumn Skies
2013	Anaïs Mitchell & Jefferson Hamer	"Willie of Winsbury (Child 100)"	Child Ballads
2016	Jim Moray	"William of Barbary"	Upcetera
2017	Olivia Chaney (as Offa Rex with The Decemberists)	"Willie O' Winsbury"	The Queen of Hearts
2019	Ye Vagabonds	"Willie O Winsbury"	The Hare's Lament
2021	Orchestra of the Swan & Jim Moray	"William of Barbary"	Labyrinths
2021	Sarah Underhill	"Willy of Winsbury"	First of my Rambles
2023	Lady Moon	"Willy O' Winsbury"	Lady Moon
2026	Hyning Scout	"Willie O Winsbury"	The Yearling Sessions: Volume I

== See also ==
- List of the Child Ballads
- Johnie Scot
