= Philip Donnelly (musician) =

Irish musician (1948–2019)

- Born: 31 December 1948; Clontarf, Dublin, Ireland
- Died: 28 November 2019 (aged 70) Waterford, Ireland
- Genres: Country, rock
- Occupations: Musician, songwriter, producer
- Instruments: Vocals, guitar
- Formerly of: John Prine, Nanci Griffith, Everly Brothers, Townes Van Zandt, Lee Clayton,

Philip Donnelly (31 December 1948 – 28 November 2019) was a guitarist, songwriter and producer born in Clontarf, Dublin. Known as the Clontarf Cowboy, he gained international recognition touring and recording with artists such as the Everly Brothers, Johnny Cash, Nanci Griffith, Townes Van Zandt, John Prine and Donovan.

== Career ==
Philip Donnelly began his music career in the late 1960s with the Dublin-based band Portrait, which morphed into the rock band Elmer Fudd; the band supported Thin Lizzy in 1971. Later that year Donnelly left the band to tour with Donovan.

After touring with Donovan in 1974, Donnelly decided to settle in Los Angeles, where he first began to work with Lee Clayton. Donnelly eventually worked on four Lee Clayton albums as a guitarist, composer and backing vocalist. Donnelly had unique style as a guitarist, blending rock, folk, Irish traditional music and country, which saw him become a much in-demand session musician. In the early 1980's he moved to Nashville, where he came to the attention of producer Jim Rooney. Over the next eleven years he worked with a number of country and folks artists including: Guy Clark, Don Williams, Jim Rooney, Emmylou Harris, The Everly Brothers and Johnny Cash. In particular he was associated with Nanci Griffith playing guitar on eight of her albums, including her Grammy-winning album Other Voices, Other Rooms. He also co-wrote the Crystal Gayle hit "Livin' in These Troubled Times" with Roger Cooke and Sam Hogin. The song went on to win the BMI Country Song of the Year award.

== Ireland ==
In his native Ireland he is perhaps best known for his work with John Prine. Donnelly played guitar on John Prine's albums Aimless Love and German Afternoons. He first met Prine in 1980 and played and toured with Prine throughout the 1980s and early '90s. In 1986 Donnelly was also responsible for bringing Prine to Ireland for the first time, where he played a number of small venues before Donnelly invited Prine to take part in his televised concert series for RTÉ called The Session, recorded at the newly opened Point Depot in 1988.

Donnelly returned to Ireland in the late 1980s to help care for his mother, settling in Clonmel, County Tipperary. He continued to write music and worked with a number of Irish artists including Clannad, the Fleadh Cowboys, The Hothouse Flowers and De Dannan. In 1994 he produced Townes Van Zandt's last studio album No Deeper Blue. In 1978 Donnelly had played guitar on Van Zandt's album Flyin' Shoes and Van Zandt claimed that it came to him in a dream that he should make another record with Philip Donnelly. Van Zandt flew to Ireland where Donnelly had booked ten days at the Xeric studios in Limerick. For the recording Donnelly brought together some of the leading folk and traditional musicians in Ireland, including Robbie Brennan on drums, Declan Masterson on the Uilleann pipes and Paul Kelly on fiddle. The singer-songwriter Donovan also appears on the album playing harmonica.

From the mid-90s onward Donnelly toured Ireland and recorded as a solo artist and with his band The Regulators. In 2015 he released his final album Beyond the Pale his first studio album for nearly 15 years, which included duets with John Prine and Crystal Gayle.

== Discography ==
Philip Donnelly

- Town and Country (1988)
- Silver Station (1991)
- Live At The Midleton Folk Club Philip Donnelly And The Free Range Picker's Almost Unplugged (2003)
- Beyond the Pale (2015)

The Regulators

- Inner Feelings (1995)
- The Spirit of Communication (1997)

== Death ==
Philip Donnelly died in University Hospital Waterford on 28 November 2019, at the age of 70.
