= Beth Patterson =

American musician

- Patterson at Dragon Con in 2026

Background information
- Born: Beth Waggoner Patterson; Lafayette, Louisiana
- Genres: Irish Folk, Celtic Music
- Instrument: bouzouki
- Formerly of: Poor Clares, Round Pegs Duo
- Spouse: Josh Paxton
- Website: bethpattersonmusic.com

Beth Waggoner Patterson is an Irish folk and Celtic musician and singer, based in New Orleans, Louisiana. She combines traditional Irish, Celtic and folk ballads with Cajun, world-beat, and progressive rock influences and her own creative songwriting.

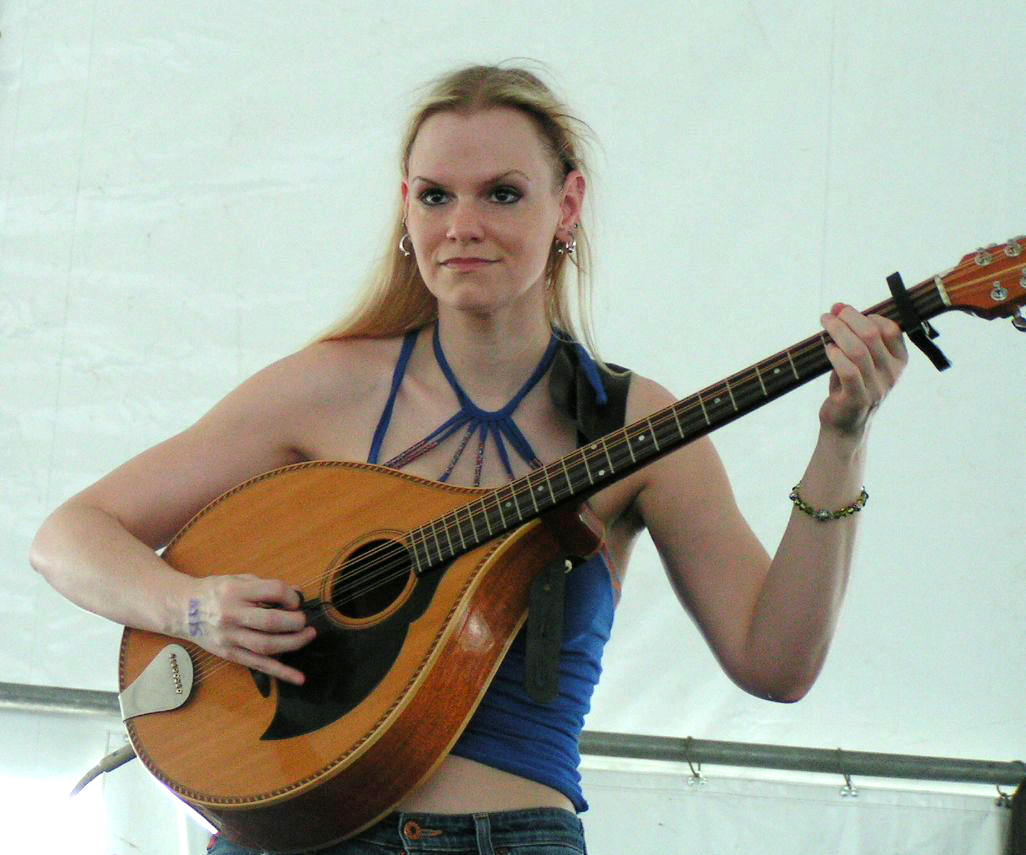
Patterson in 2006

== History ==
A native of Lafayette, Louisiana, Patterson began her professional career in her teens as a classical oboist and a Cajun bass player. She spent a year studying traditional Irish music and ethnomusicology at University College Cork in Ireland, where she began to experiment with musical fusion. She later finished her bachelor's degree in Music Therapy from Loyola University New Orleans. Patterson cites the "progressive rock" band Rush as a major musical influence.

Patterson was a founding member of the ensemble the Poor Clares, who debuted in 2003 at the New Orleans Jazz and Heritage Festival to rave reviews. The Poor Clares' albums include Change of Habit and Songs for Midwinter, distributed nationally by Centaur Records. Patterson released her first four solo albums on the Little Blue Men Records label, including two studio productions, the somewhat more traditionally-oriented but still musically eclectic Hybrid Vigor, the world-beat and progressive-rock-influenced Take Some Fire, and the 2005 live album, Caught in the Act. Her 2009 release, On Better Paths, is the most daring, crossing boundaries of form and genre even further. The recording received a Grammy nomination for Best Contemporary Folk Album. After leaving Little Blue Men Records, Patterson continued to record solo albums. She has also played on and produced other albums, including Orin (2005) by the French Breton progressive-folk group TornaoD. She has appeared on over two hundred recordings.

Patterson was a regular performer at O'Flaherty's Irish Pub in New Orleans's famed French Quarter, until the Pub closed when Hurricane Katrina hit at the end of August 2005. Patterson has since been playing regularly at other New Orleans venues, particularly the Kerry Irish Pub. She has also performed in twenty countries including Australia & New Zealand, Belgium, Canada, France, Germany, and Ireland, much of Central America, as well as much of the United States. She is especially a favorite of Celtic music fans in the Washington, D.C. area.

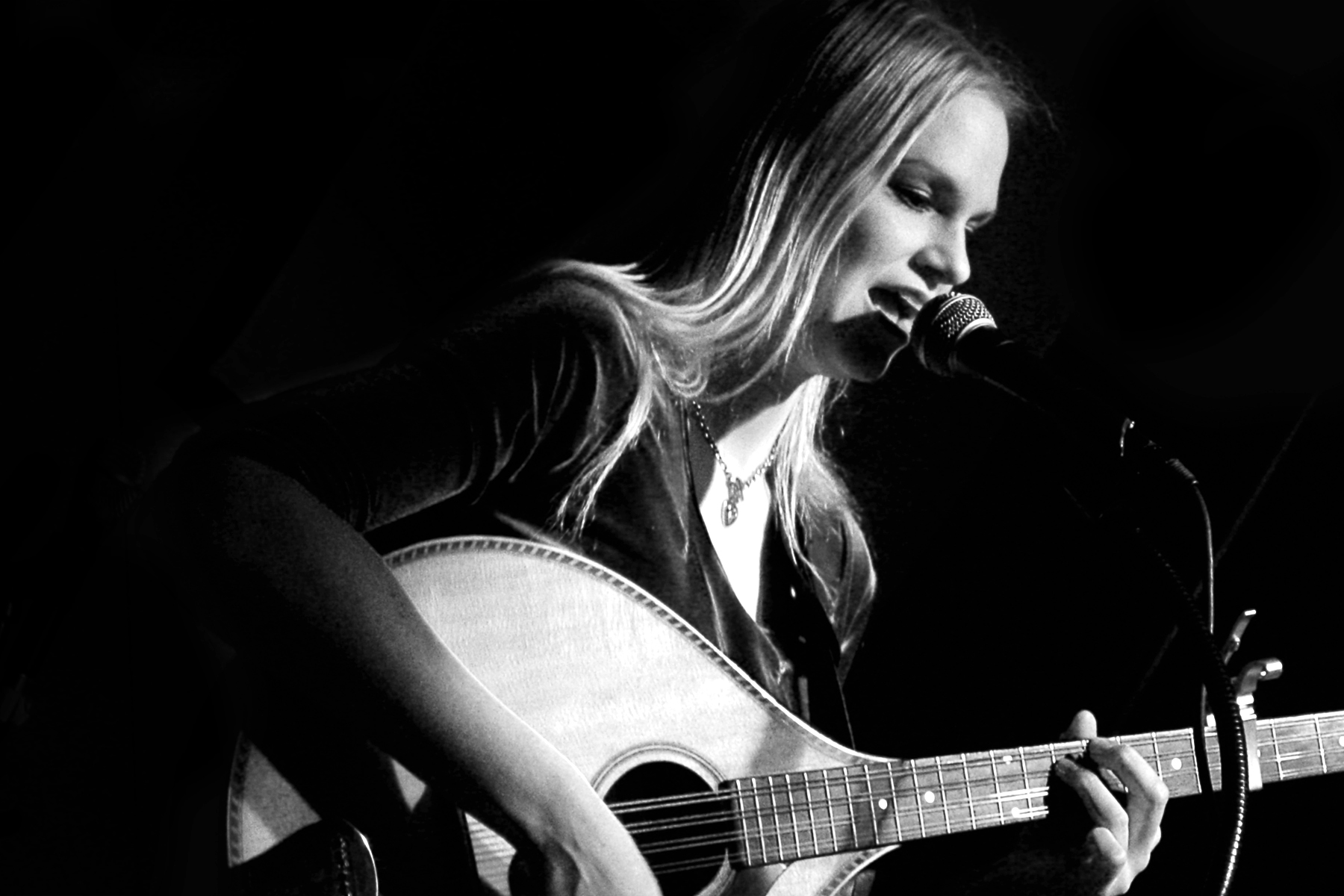
Beth Patterson: February 2008 in Lewisburg, WV; photo by James M. Owston

Starting in 2013 into 2018, "Bad Beth & Beyond", Beth Patterson's bawdy and profane alter ego, performed in the French Quarter. "Bad Beth" used the Irish bouzouki, just as Patterson does, while singing risque originals and covers. "Bad Beth & Beyond" released an album that she later voluntarily discontinued, renouncing some material she found to be alienating. She continues to release singles for the FuMP (Funny Music Project) https://www.thefump.com. (See also Bed Bath and Beyond.)

Patterson, singing and bouzouki, and her husband Josh Paxton, on piano, perform as the duo ZoüKeys, as of 2017. Also as of 2019, Patterson performs solo, and with the Round Pegs Duo, the Round Pegs 3 Piece Duo, a duo with Patrick O'Flaherty (also of the Poor Clares), New Orleans Steamcog Orchestra (as "B.P. Hatbox"), as a bouzouki or English horn player, etc.

== Instruments ==
Patterson's preferred instrument is the Irish bouzouki, a teardrop-shaped eight-string instrument of Greek origin that became popular in Irish music in the 1960s. She plays a 10-string bouzouki as well. She also continues to play bass guitar live and in the studio. Patterson uses Infiniti oboe reeds, D'Addario strings, and an Ebow string driver.

== Other media ==
Beth Patterson's first major motion picture appearance was in Spinal Tap II: The End Continues as part of Nigel Tufnel's pub band.

Patterson's film soundtrack credits include the motion pictures Lucinda's Spell, One Eyed King (starring William Baldwin and Armand Assante), and most recently Mike Judge's Extract (on Miramax), starring Jason Bateman, Mila Kunis, and Ben Affleck.

Patterson was mentioned in three of the Griffen McCandles (Dragons) series of novels written by science fiction/fantasy authors Robert Asprin and Jody Lynn Nye: Dragons Wild, Dragons Deal, and Dragons Run. An entire chapter of Dragons Run takes place at a fictional Patterson concert.

Patterson began writing fiction in 2012. She has contributed to over eighty anthologies and published her first novel The Wild Harmonic in 2016. Some of Beth's fiction has been archived in the Lunar Codex time capsule. Her first story to be included was part of Peregrine Lunar Lander payload which traveled just past lunar orbit before returning to earth.

== Discography ==
=== Albums and extended plays ===
- Hybrid Vigor (1999, Little Blue Men Records)
- Take Some Fire (2002, Little Blue Men Records)
- Caught in the Act (2005, Little Blue Men Records)
- On Better Paths (2009, Little Blue Men Records)
- 2 Deep - as "Bad Beth & Beyond" (2011)
- Hippocampus (2012, Threadhead Records)
- Caelic - with Patrick O'Flaherty (2012, Speak Jolly Music)
- Forward (2013)
- Momotaro! Live in Japan EP (2014, Speak Jolly Music)
- Senzorga - as ZoüKeys with Josh Paxton (2017, Stone Groove Records)
- Singles - a collection of singles released 2014-2020 (2021, Stone Groove Records)
- The Cigar Box EP (2024 Stone Groove Records)

==== With the Poor Clares ====
- Resurrected Lover (1996)
- Change of Habit (1998, Centaur Records)
- Songs for Midwinter (1998, Centaur Records)

=== Digital singles ===
- Happy Birthday, Butt-Face (2014, Speak Jolly Music)
- No Strings Attached (2014, Speak Jolly Music)
- Black Swan Rising - with Randy Jackson (2016, Stone Groove Records)
- Heat (2016, Stone Groove Records)
- Matchstick (2016, Stone Groove Records)
- Wasted Years (2016, Stone Groove Records)
- Shot in the Dark (2017, Stone Groove Records)
- Hurrisplain (2021, The FuMP) https://thefump.com/music/song/hurrispain
- Harry Poppins - with the New Orleans Steamcog Orchestra (2018)
- Air Dance (2019, Stone Groove Records)
- Digging Up My Bones, lyrics by Gwyndyn T. Alexander (2018, Stone Groove Records)
- A Winter's Day (2019, Stone Groove Records)
- Red Lenses- featuring Johnny Sketch and the Dirty Notes (2020, Stone Groove Records)
- Return to Our Caves/This Goes to Eleven-featuring Billy Sherwood (2020, Stone Groove Records)

== Books ==
- Mongrels and Misfits - collection (2014, DarkStar Books/Event Horizon Publishing Group
- The Wild Harmonic - novel (2016, Hidden World Books, ISBN 978-1943052387)

- The Spirit of Rodeo - novelette (2021, Black Hare Press)
