= Joe Dolan (disambiguation) =

Joe Dolan (1939–2007) was an Irish entertainer, recorder and singer of easy listening songs.

Joe Dolan may also refer to:

- "Galway Joe" Dolan (1942–2008), Irish musician, songwriter and artist
- Joe Dolan (footballer) (born 1980), English footballer
- Joe Dolan (baseball) (1873–1938), American professional baseball player
