= Andy Irvine & Dónal Lunny's Mozaik =

- Origin: Ireland, Bulgaria/Hungary, Netherlands, United States
- Genres: Irish; Old-timey; Balkan; Southeastern European folk
- Years active: 2002–present day
- Members: Andy Irvine; Bruce Molsky; Nikola Parov; Rens van der Zalm
- Past members: Dónal Lunny (Died 2026)
- Website: andyirvine.com

Andy Irvine & Dónal Lunny's Mozaik [a.k.a. Mozaik] is a multicultural folk band consisting of Andy Irvine, Dónal Lunny, Bruce Molsky, Nikola Parov and Rens van der Zalm. Created in 2002, the band have toured Australia, Europe, USA and Japan, and recorded four albums.

== History ==
=== The first 'Mosaic' (1984–1985) ===
In the winter of 1984, Irvine gathered a collection of musicians from throughout Europe and formed 'Mosaic', with a final line-up including Irvine himself, Dónal Lunny along with his former Moving Hearts associate, uilleann piper Declan Masterson, Danish bassist and singer Lissa Ladefoged, Dutch guitarist and singer Hans Theessink, and Hungarian singer Márta Sebestyén from Muzsikás.

Their first public gig was in Budapest on 12 July 1985, followed by a further two gigs in Hungary and an appearance at the Dranouter festival in Belgium in early August, prior to their English tour. Their seventh gig was billed at the Southport Arts Center, which Chris Hardwick of Folk Roots reviewed with the following introduction: "Every once in a while the folk scene throws up a new permutation in which exceptionally gifted individuals come together to produce something so innovative and exhilarating that it goes way beyond the sum of the parts".

Their set included: Stan Rogers's "Northwest Passage", an unspecified Macedonian dance tune ("one of Andy's 90 mph specials"), a solo Hungarian love song from Sebestyén, a brooding cover of Eric Von Schmidt's Caribbean lament "Joshua Gone Barbados" from Theessink, the Irish three (Irvine, Lunny and Masterson) on a set of reels including "The Spike Island Lasses", and Irvine singing Andy Mitchell's "Indiana". However, the band lasted only that one summer.

A couple of years later, Irvine stated that he would have liked to try the experiment again by concentrating on the Irish and East European sound without bringing in the blues influence.

=== The second 'Mozaik' (2002-present day) ===
In early 2002, Irvine drafted some long-time musical friends and formed his dream band, consisting of himself and Lunny, American fiddler Bruce Molsky, Bulgaro-Hungarian multi-instrumentalist Nikola Parov (Zsaratnok, the Riverdance band) and Dutch multi-instrumentalist Rens van der Zalm (Fungus, Wolverei). Their repertoire includes selections of Irvine's own compositions, Irish traditional songs, Southeastern European/Balkan folk music, and Molsky's Old-timey songs and Appalachian fiddling. Between them, they play the following instruments:

- Andy Irvine: vocals, mandolin, mandola, Irish bouzouki, hurdy-gurdy, harmonica
- Dónal Lunny (2002-2026): vocals, Irish bouzouki, guitars, bodhrán
- Bruce Molsky: vocals, fiddle, guitar, 5-string banjo
- Nikola Parov: gadulka, gaida, kaval, bouzouki, guitar, tin whistle, nyckelharpa, clarinet, percussion
- Rens van der Zalm: fiddle, viola, guitar, mandolin, piano, accordion, oud, low whistle

Since their collaboration began in 2002, they have toured Australia, Europe, USA and Japan with great success.

== Recordings ==
=== Live from the Powerhouse ===
On 1 March 2002, Mozaik congregated in the seaside town of Rye, Victoria in Australia for six days of intensive rehearsals. The Australian tour that followed culminated in two gigs recorded at the Brisbane Powerhouse on 30/31 March and released on the album Live from the Powerhouse in 2004, under license to Compass Records.

=== Changing Trains ===
In January and April 2005, the band rehearsed new material for Changing Trains, their first studio album recorded in Budapest during November of the same year. This album was initially released by the band in Australia in 2006 and, after additional re-mixing by Lunny at Longbeard Studios in Dublin, was re-released in the autumn of 2007 under license to Compass Records.

=== Andy Irvine/70th Birthday Concert at Vicar St 2012 ===
On 16 and 17 June 2012, two concerts took place at Dublin's Vicar Street venue to celebrate Irvine's 70th birthday. He was joined onstage by Paul Brady and various combinations of members of Sweeney's Men, Planxty, Mozaik and LAPD, plus brothers George and Manoli Galiatsos who came unexpectedly all the way from Athens for the concerts. A CD and a separate DVD were released, each featuring a different selection of material from the concerts.

=== The Long and The Short Of it ===
Recorded in Budapest in September 2015, Mosaik's third album was released in 2019 and includes guest vocalists Chrysoula Kechagioglou and Ágnes Herczku.

== Discography ==
- 2004: Live from the Powerhouse
- 2008: Changing Trains
- 2014: Andy Irvine/70th Birthday Concert at Vicar St 2012
- 2019: The Long and The Short Of It

== Filmography ==
- Andy Irvine 70th Birthday Concert at Vicar St 2012 (2014), DVD
- Mozaik on Tour 2014 (2014), YouTube video clip

== Bibliography ==
- Planxty (Songbook) (1973). London: Mews Music.
- Irvine, Andy (1988). Aiming For The Heart (1st ed.). Germany: Heupferd Musik Verlag GmbH. ISBN 39-2344-501-6.
- O'Toole, Leagues (2006). The Humours of Planxty. Ireland: Hodder Headline. ISBN 03-4083-796-9.
- Irvine, Andy (2008). Aiming For The Heart: Irish Song Affairs (2nd expanded ed.). Germany: Heupferd Musik Verlag GmbH. ISBN 978-3-92-344505-9.
- Huntington, Gale; Herrmann, Lani; Moulden, John, eds. (2010). Sam Henry's Songs of the People. Athens, GA and London: The University of Georgia Press. ISBN 08-2033-625-4.
