= Paul Kelly (Irish musician) =

Irish folk musician

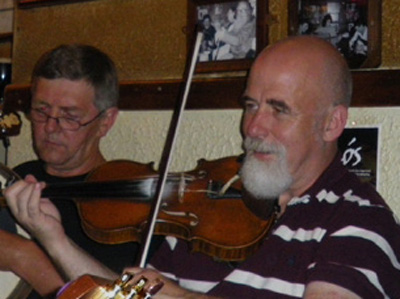
- Paul Kelly performing in Dublin, May 2010

Background information
- Born: 1957 (age 68–69)
- Origin: Dublin, Ireland
- Genres: Contemporary; traditional; classical; bluegrass; country
- Occupations: Musician; multi-instrumentalist
- Instruments: Mandolin; fiddle; banjo
- Years active: 1980–present

Paul Kelly (born 1957) is an Irish multi-instrumentalist and musician from Tallaght in Dublin, Ireland. He has played Irish traditional music, bluegrass and country, and is equally at home in a variety of different styles of music.

== Early life ==
At 12 years of age, and already playing the guitar for five years, he was introduced to Irish Traditional Music by neighbour and fiddler Des Carty, who taught fiddle. During his teenage years he developed as a banjo and mandolin player, making many trips to Fleadhs (Irish Music Festivals), as well as many weekends in County Clare, where his style was honed, playing regularly with the Russell brothers from Doolin, Noel Hill, Tony Linnane and other great Clare musicians. In 1975, he won the Slógadh award as All-Ireland banjo champion. Around this time Paul also started to play fiddle and gig with different folk bands in the Dublin area.

== Musical career ==
In the early eighties, he discovered Bluegrass and spent four years as fiddler with the Sackville String Band, the popular Dublin outfit that played at concerts and festivals all over the country. The band had been established by Niall Toner in late 1975. Influenced by the recordings of the Fuzzy Mountain, Hollow Rock, and Highwoods String Bands they played "American traditional music, old-time songs and bluegrass". A typical line-up of the band when Kelly joined was Imor Byrne (fiddle), Colin Beggan (guitar), John Caulfield (fiddle), Niall Toner (mandolin) and Richard Hawkins (banjo). The band's reputation was such that many visiting U.S. musicians would jam on stage with them and so Kelly got to hear and play with Bluegrass legends like Peter Rowan, Tex Logan and Kenny Baker.

When Niall Toner went off to form Hank Halfhead & the Rambling Turkeys, Kelly joined forces with Irish singer/songwriter Mick Hanly, whose band Rusty Old Halo, he helped to form. Their only release, Still Not Cured, played a large part in establishing a "New Country Music Scene" in Dublin, with bands like The Wilf Brothers, Hank Halfhead, Chris Meehan and his Redneck Friends and the biggest of them all, The Fleadh Cowboys, all touring the country on a regular basis. He even played support to the legendary Fionnuisce at The Earl Grattan venue.

Although he had played with all the above bands at some stage, he joined The Fleadh Cowboys in 1989, who were one of the hottest bands in Ireland at that time, touring regularly around the country and also playing monthly in two of London's best known venues: The Mean Fiddler and The Powerhouse. In Dublin, The Fleadh's had the night owls dancing in the aisles at their weekly late-night sell-out residency at The Olympia Theatre. The band established a format where every week a guest or guests would join them on stage. Some of the more notable were The Waterboys, The Hothouse Flowers, Nanci Griffith, John Prine and Joe Ely. The Fleadhs popularity was such at that time that they were invited to play support to U2 in The Point Theatre and to Bob Dylan in the RDS. They also supported The Pogues (who were riding high on the success of Fairytale of New York), on the English and Irish leg of their world tour.

In March 1992, after he had established himself as a studio session musician, and had composed the music for the Irish movie, Hard Shoulder, Kelly returned to his traditional roots by joining with Trevor Hutchinson and Gerry O'Beirne in The Sharon Shannon Band. They toured America and Europe that year, in a hectic schedule which culminated with a Late Late Show TV Special which was dedicated to the Clare accordion wizard.

In 1997 Kelly founded a record company called Malgamú Music, which tapped into the new eclecticism in Traditional Irish music, and encouraged its artists to experiment with other musical styles, although keeping Irish Music at the core. This project saw six releases including those by the exciting band Lia Luachra, fiddler Kevin O' Connor, guitarist Sean Whelan and his own offering "a mandolin album", which received excellent reviews and is often quoted as a defining album in Irish music for the mandolin.

== Current Activity ==
In 2002 he began teaching music in BCFE, a third level college in Dublin. He still teaches there and has also given mandolin workshops in Haapavesi, Finland; Milwaukee University, USA; Carlo Aonzo's International Mandolin Academy in Ferrara, Italy; Tesserete, Switzerland and in the University of Limerick, Ireland.

A book of 110 mandolin tunes selected from his repertoire (including some of his own compositions) was published in 2007 and is distributed by Mel Bay.

He currently plays and tours with popular Irish singer Eleanor Shanley and singer/guitarist Frankie Lane.

In November 2013 (Germany tour) and February–March 2014 (UK tour) he stood in for Gerry O'Connor, the fiddler and banjo player of "The Dublin Legends", an Irish folk band founded by the remaining members of "The Dubliners".

== Discography ==
=== Studio albums ===
- A Mandolin Album (1998)

=== Appears On ===
- The Black Family (The Black Family, 1986)
- Still Not Cured (Mick Hanly and Rusty Old Halo, 1987)
- Hi-Ace to Heaven (The Fleadh Cowboys, 1988)
- A Sonic Holiday (Engine Alley, 1992)
- No Deeper Blue (Townes van Zandt, 1994)
- Out the Gap (Sharon Shannon, 1995)
- Dobro (Frankie Lane, 1995)
- Further Along (The Dubliners, 1996)
- Lia Luachra (Lia Luachra, 1998)
- Traffic (Lia Luachra, 2000)
- You'll Never Beat the Irish (The Wolfe Tones, 2001)
- Gunsmoke at El Paso (Frankie Lane, 2003)
- Live at the Spiegeltent (Jerry Fish & The Mudbug Club, 2004)
- A Place of My Own (Eleanor Shanley with Frankie Lane & Paul Kelly, 2008)
