= Pete Cummins =

Irish musician

- Born: 1946 (age 79–80); Dublin, Ireland
- Genres: Folk, rock
- Occupation: Musician
- Member of: Fleadh Cowboys

Pete Cummins (born 1946, Dublin, Ireland), is an Irish musician, guitarist, singer and songwriter, actor and record producer. Cummins plays acoustic, bass and electric guitars. He won a Grammy Award for Best Contemporary Folk Album after his vocal contribution to the album Other Voices, Other Rooms by Nanci Griffith, at the 1993 ceremony. He was founding a member of Irish band The Fleadh Cowboys. In the sixties and seventies he was a member of Irish rock band, Granny's Intentions, they recorded one album for the Deram label, Honest Injun which featured guitarist Gary Moore on his first professional recording. He has also recorded with Townes Van Zandt on his last studio album No Deeper Blue, toured and recorded with The Chieftains. The Fleadh Cowboys supported Bob Dylan, toured with the Pogues, and Emmylou Harris They recorded two albums, High Ace to Heaven in 1988 and Time of your Life in 1997. He was the band leader for two bands, The Stepping Stones and The Circle.

In 2008 he released his first solo album The Brilliant Architect, followed in 2014 with Crooked Highway and in 2016 a compilation double album Lookin'For the Magic. He has had small parts in films. Green Journey, In the Name of the Father, Roddy Doyle's TV series Family, A Man of No Importance. In 2019 he was part of a three hander with Maria McDermattroe and Helen Hunt in the short film "Saving Grace", for which he also wrote the music and performed live in it.
