= O'Donoghue's Pub =

Historic building in Dublin, Ireland

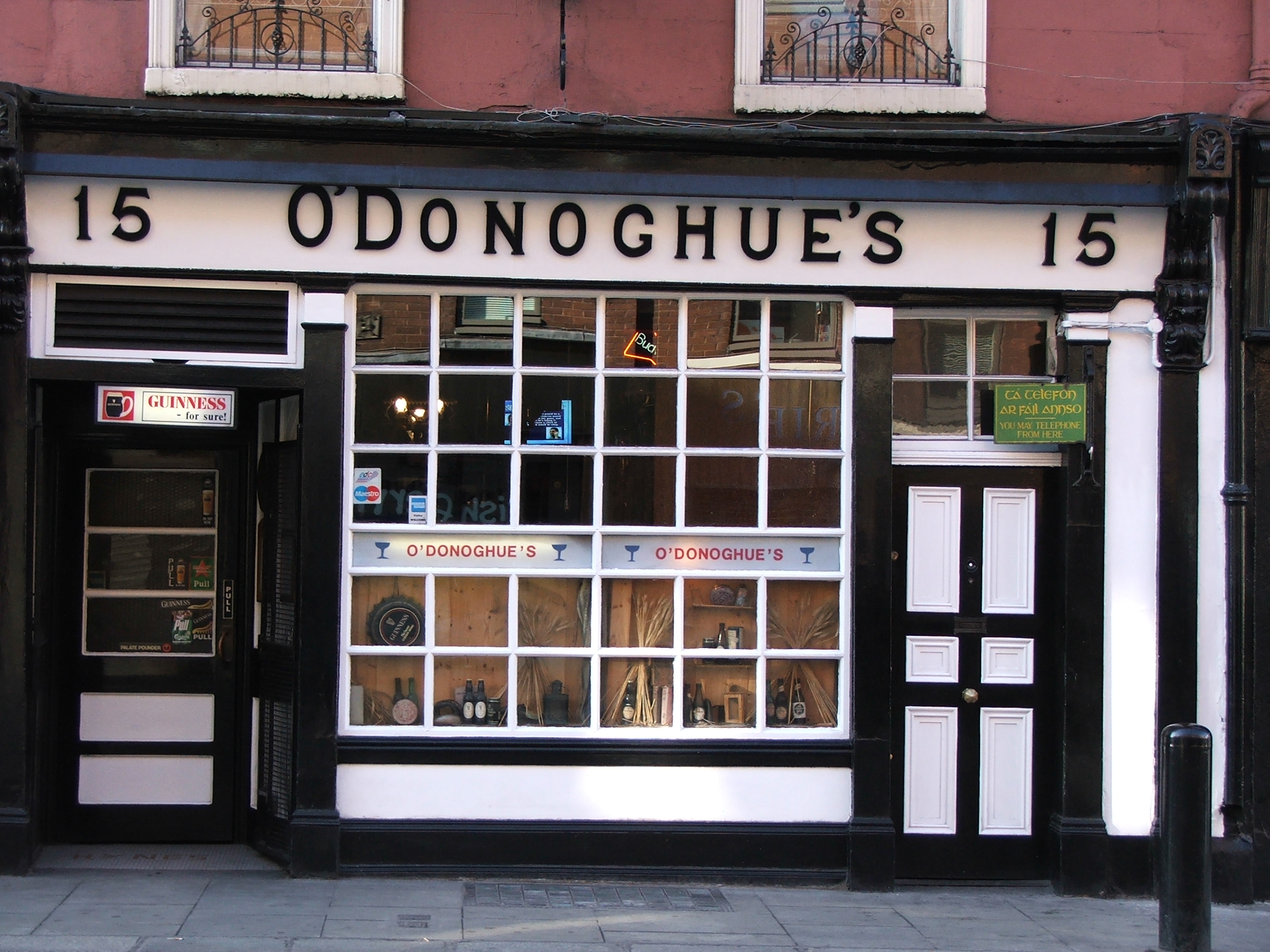
- O'Donoghue's pub in central Dublin city
- Interactive map of the O'Donoghue's Pub area

General information
- Location: 15 Merrion Row, Dublin 2, Dublin, Ireland
- Coordinates: 53.338193°N 6.254158°W
- Current tenants: The family of Oliver Barden
- Completed: 1789 as a grocery store
- Opened: 1934

O’Donoghue’s Pub (also known as O'Donoghue's Bar) is a historically significant drinking establishment located at 15 Merrion Row, Dublin 2, Ireland—near St. Stephen's Green on Dublin’s south side. Built in 1789 as a grocery store, it began operating full-time as a pub when purchased by the O’Donoghue family in 1934.

== History ==
This pub is closely associated with Irish traditional music and was where the popular Irish folk group, The Dubliners, began performing in the early 1960s.

Many other notable Irish musicians including Séamus Ennis, Joe Heaney, Andy Irvine, Christy Moore, The Fureys and Phil Lynott have played at O’Donoghue’s, and their photographs are displayed in the pub.

Included are portraits of The Dubliners themselves: the five founding members Ronnie Drew, Luke Kelly, Ciarán Bourke, John Sheahan and Barney McKenna, as well as later members Eamonn Campbell and Seán Cannon; these photographs hang to the right of the entrance, where the nightly sessions are played.

O’Donoghue’s

It was August 1962
When I first set foot in O’Donoghue’s
A world of music, friends and booze
Opened up before me
I never could’ve guessed as I walked through the door
Just what the future had in store
A crossroads for my life I saw
Lying there to taunt me.

Well, I was an actor, I played straight
I played in the Gaiety, played at the Gate
My mother in 1928
Had trod those boards before me
I was getting tired of the company
An actor’s life did not suit me
I said “Goodbye; you’ll never see me
Back here in Neary’s.”

Johnny Moynihan in his fusty coat
Was the first to play there in Merrion Row
And he brought the bouzouki to Ireland, you know
“'Way storm along, John!”
Paddy and Maureen O’Donoghue
Ciarán Bourke, Luke Kelly, Ronnie Drew
Barney McKenna and me and you
In the early 1960s.

Well, Paddy and Maureen very very sound
Though she liked to camp on the moral high ground
If you had long hair you were outward bound
Go down you blood red roses
Ronnie Drew in his fine suit of blue
And a voice like gravel that would cut you in two
We thought he was Dublin through and through
But he blew in from Dún Laoghaire

Joe Ryan and John Kelly in the front bar
Their fiddles are from the County Clare
Joe Heaney sings in the cold night air
In the laneway after closing
Our sea shanties in perfect tune
And Séamus Ennis in the afternoon
It was all over much too soon
Days of Wine and Roses.

Well, Banjo Barney calling the tune
Mary Jordan’s a whizz on the spoons
Up the Swannee and Down the Broom
Barney’s rising to it
They carry him bodily out to the jacks
He empties his bladder and they carry him back
He swallows his pint and he’s right back on track
How the f*ck does he do it?

In the afternoon you might find there
Luke Kelly and his banjo and his red hair
Oh, what a time, what an atmosphere
What more could a young man wish for?
How I’d spend my time was never in doubt
This is what life was all about
A bowl of soup and a pint of stout
Agus fáigamid siúid mar a tá sé

David Smythe never short of a witty phrase
Sonny Brogan love the way he plays
Ted McKenna, God bless the days
Of Italian mandolinos
At closing time we didn’t go far
Just down the road to the Pike Coffee Bar
“The usual suspects; there you are!
Have yez no homes to go to?”

Putting up a note on the message board
Sweeney’s Men have a gig, O Lord
We have to meet at 12 o’clock
For the journey down to Galway
Bu the Sweeney van broke down at the door
And we didn’t get started till a quarter past four
To the merry tune of the Dolan snore
Haul away me Rosie

It all came to an end in ‘68
The rest of the world was lying in wait
And I started out for a new landscape
Set sail for the Pirin Mountains
From the old North Wall we sailed away
And all me friends were there on the quay
Won’t be back for many’s the day
But it was bloody great while it lasted!

It was August 1962
When I first set foot in O’Donoghue’s
A world of music, friends and booze
Hastening towards me
I never could’ve guessed as I walked through the door
Just what the future had in store
A blueprint for my life I saw
Lying there before me.

— ~ Andy Irvine, 2004

Andy Irvine wrote the tribute song "O'Donoghue's", in which he reminisces about his early days in Dublin when he first started frequenting the pub in August 1962. The song was released on the album Changing Trains (2007).

Dessie Hynes from Longford bought the bar from Paddy and Maureen O'Donoghue in 1977 and ran the pub with his family for 11 years.

In 1988, O’Donoghue’s was purchased by publicans Oliver Barden and John Mahon. Barden is still the proprietor and continues to run the pub with his family and staff to this day.

== See also ==
- List of pubs in Dublin
