= The Tracks of Sweeney =

Studio album by Sweeney's Men
- Released: 1969
- Recorded: Livingstone Studios, Barnet in 1969
- Genre: Celtic
- Label: Transatlantic
- Producer: Bill Leader

Sweeney's Men chronology
Sweeney's Men (1968)	The Tracks of Sweeney (1969)

Professional ratings
Review scores
Source	Rating
Allmusic	4/5 stars

The Tracks of Sweeney is an album by Sweeney's Men. It was first released in 1969 and re-released on CD in 1996, packaged together with Sweeney's Men. One track on this album is frequently anthologised: "Hall of Mirrors".

== Track listing ==
1. "Dreams For Me" (Terry Woods)
2. "The Pipe On The Hob" (instr) (Trad)
3. "Brain Jam" (Terry Woods)
4. "Pretty Polly" (Trad)
5. "Standing On The Shore" (Trad)
6. "A Mistake No Doubt" (Henry McCullagh/ Terry Woods)
7. "Go By Brooks" (Leonard Cohen)
8. "When You Don't Care For Me" (Terry Woods)
9. "Afterthoughts" (Terry Woods)
10. "Hiram Hubbard" (Trad)
11. "Hall Of Mirrors" (Henry McCullagh)

== Personnel ==
- Johnny Moynihan - vocal, bouzouki, tin whistle
- Terry Woods - vocals, 6-string guitar, 12-string guitar, banjo, concertina
