= Niall Toner =

- Born: 1944 (age 80–81)
- Origin: Dublin, Ireland
- Genres: Bluegrass, country
- Occupation(s): Musician, radio broadcaster, event organiser
- Instrument(s): Mandolin, guitar, vocals
- Years active: 1970–present
- Website: http://www.nialltonerband.com

Niall Edward Toner (born 1944) is an Irish bluegrass musician, songwriter and radio broadcaster from Dublin, known nationwide for his programmes Country Heartland and Roots Freeway.

== Musical career ==
Toner organised his first acoustic band in the early sixties with the formation of The Lee Valley String Band in Cork. He started the Sackville String Band in late 1975, a popular Dublin outfit that played at concerts and festivals all over the country. Influenced by the recordings of the Fuzzy Mountain, Hollow Rock, and Highwoods String Bands they played "American traditional music, old-time songs and bluegrass". A typical line-up in the late 1970s consisted of Imor Byrne (fiddle), Colin Beggan (guitar), John Caulfield (fiddle), Niall Toner (mandolin) and Richard Hawkins (banjo). The band's reputation was such that many visiting U.S. musicians would jam on stage with them, Bluegrass legends like Peter Rowan, Tex Logan and Kenny Baker.

Niall Toner went off to form Hank Halfhead & the Rambling Turkeys in the early 1980s. He formed his current outfit, the Niall Toner Band, in 2001 with Dick Gladney on bass and Clem O'Brian on guitars. They have recorded three albums to date, with the help of Bill Whelan, Richard Hawkins, and Martin Styles on five-string and claw-hammer banjos and Colm McCauhey on fiddle.

His songs have been recorded by Bill Wyman, The Nashville Bluegrass Band, Albert Lee, the Fleadh Cowboys and The Special Consensus, among others. His composition, "Nuns Island Reel", has been included in the biggest-selling video game in history, Grand Theft Auto IV.

Toner currently hosts Roots Freeway on RTÉ radio. His music articles have been published by Hot Press, Maverick and Country Music Plus. He is also the author of Nuts and Bolts, a guide to writing better songs.

== Discography ==
Niall Toner Band

- There's A Better Way Avalon Records AVCD 004 (2009)
- Mood Swing
- NTB3
