= Sweeney's Men (album) =

Studio album by Sweeney's Men
- Released: 1968
- Recorded: Early 1968, at Livingston Studios, Barnet
- Genre: Folk music of Ireland, Scotland, England and American Old-timey
- Length: 43:29
- Label: Transatlantic
- Producer: Bill Leader

Sweeney's Men chronology
Sweeney's Men (1968)	The Tracks of Sweeney (1969)

Professional ratings
Review scores
Source	Rating
Allmusic	link

Sweeney's Men is an album by Sweeney's Men, recorded in early 1968 after 'Galway Joe' Dolan had left the band and been replaced by Terry Woods.

Johnny Moynihan contributed "Rattlin' Roarin' Willy"—a song written by Robbie Burns and set to the slip jig rhythm (9/8)—and also Pecker Dunne's "Sullivan John", which had previously been sung by Dolan before he left the band. Moynihan also sang "Dicey Riley" and "The Handsome Cabin Boy", which he learnt from the singing of A.L. Lloyd. "Johnston" is Moynihan's version of the tale of sinister murder also known as "Three Huntsmen", listed as entry H185 in Sam Henry's collection, Song the People

Andy Irvine contributed the sea shanty "Sally Brown", which he learnt from a Library of Congress recording of an old sailor in a Seamen's Home in Virginia. He also recorded the ballad "Willy O' Winsbury", the lyrics of which he learned from Child's English and Scottish Popular Ballads, and which he set to a different air. Irvine also covered the English folk song "Dance to Your Daddy", along with the Irish traditional song "Reynard The Fox", which celebrates a fox chase that took place in 1793.

Terry Woods brought the well-known American ballad "Tom Dooley" and also the southern ballad "The House Carpenter", based on a recording by Clarence Ashley. Woods also composed new music for "My Dearest Dear", a song by Peggy Seeger.

Moynihan and Irvine learnt the slip jig "The Exile's Jig" from a group of traditional musicians based in Dublin called Ceoltóirí Chualann, led by Seán Ó Riada.

The album was re-released on CD in 1996, packaged together with Sweeney's Men second album, The Tracks of Sweeney.

The album is included in the collection Irish Folk Favourites. "Old Woman In Cotton" is included on the collection Galway Bay: Irish Folk Traditions. These are available on streaming platforms.

== Track listing ==
1. "Rattlin' Roarin' Willy" (Trad., Arr. Woods/Irvine/Moynihan) – 2:25
2. "Sullivan's John" (Pecker Dunne) – 3:15
3. "Sally Brown" (Trad., Arr. Woods/Irvine/Moynihan) – 2:20
4. "My Dearest Dear" (P. Seeger/T. Woods) – 3:53
5. "The Exile's Jig" (instr) (Trad., Arr. Woods/Irvine/Moynihan) – 1:39
6. "The Handsome Cabin Boy" (Trad., Arr. Woods/Irvine/Moynihan) – 4:45
7. "Dicey Riley" (Dominic Behan) – 1:41
8. "Tom Dooley" (F. Warner) – 2:32
9. "Willy O'Winsbury"" (Trad., Arr. Irvine) – 4:57
10. "Dance To Your Daddy" (Trad., Arr. Woods/Irvine/Moynihan) – 2:14
11. "The House Carpenter" (Trad., Arr. Woods/Irvine/Moynihan) – 3:57
12. "Johnston" (Trad., Arr. Woods/Irvine/Moynihan) – 3:40
13. "Reynard The Fox" (Trad., Arr. Woods/Irvine/Moynihan) – 3:26
14. "Old Woman In Cotton" (Carrol, Irvine) – 2:45 (*)

(*) Additional track on the 1996 CD.

== Personnel ==
- Andy Irvine - vocals, mandolin, bouzouki, harmonica, guitar
- Johnny Moynihan - vocals, bouzouki, tin whistle
- Terry Woods - vocals, 6-string guitar, 12-string guitar, banjo, concertina
