= Daoirí Farrell =

Irish folk singer and player of the Irish bouzouki (born 1982)

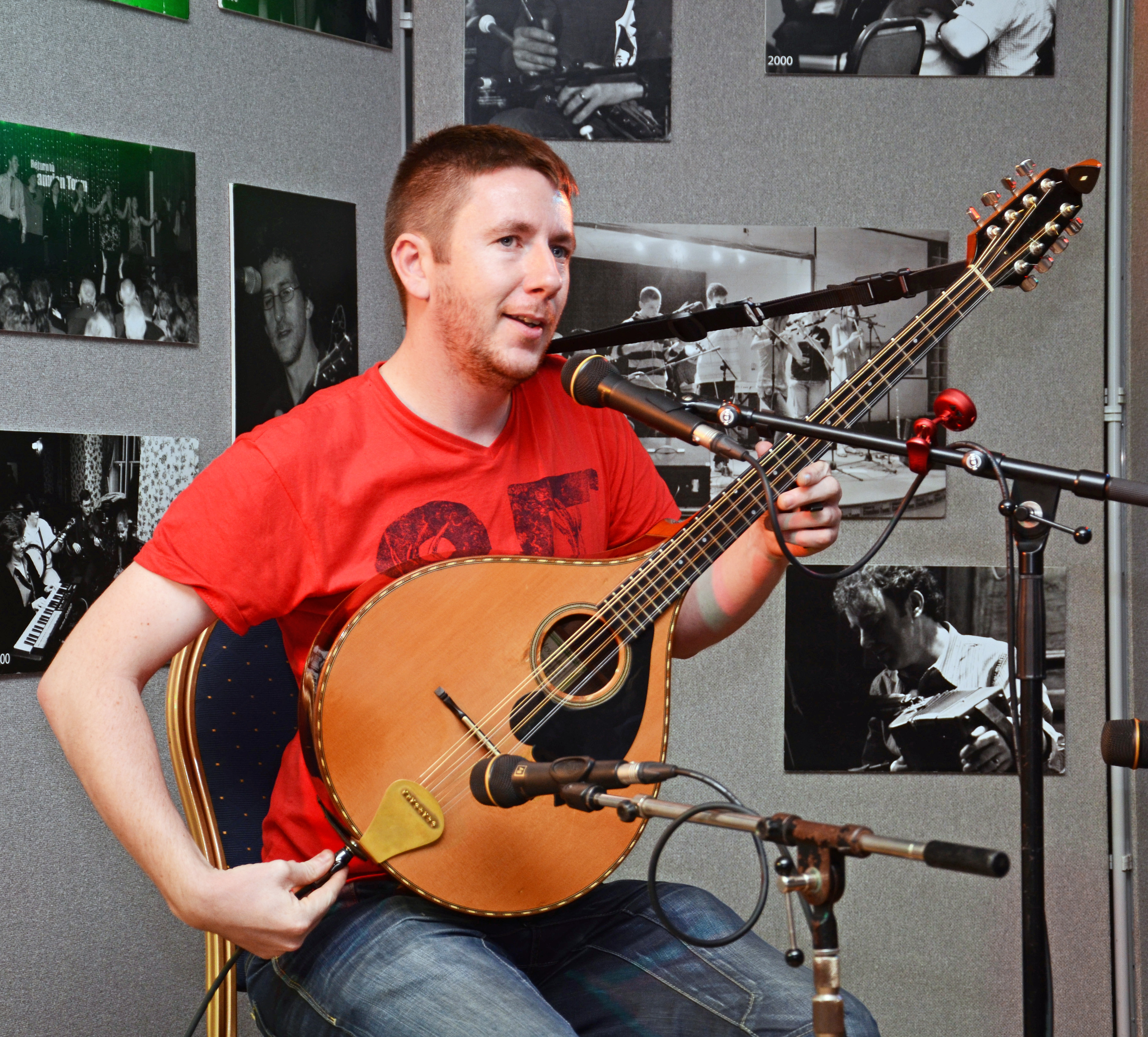
Daoirí Farrell performing at the Return to Camden Town Festival, 2013

Daoirí Farrell (b. November 21, 1982) is an Irish folk singer and player of the Irish bouzouki.

== Career ==
Farrell was born in Crumlin, Dublin. He became a member of the Góilín Singers Club. He spent 10 years working as an electrician before deciding to pursue his interest in music full-time.

He returned to education to gain a Ceoltóir Diploma in Irish Music Performance at Ballyfermot College of Further Education. During his time at college, he released his first album The First Turn in 2009. Farrell continued in education with studies in applied music at Dundalk's Institute of Technology, followed by an MA in Music Performance at the World Academy of Music in the University of Limerick.

After completing his MA, he returned to touring and recording. He won the All Ireland Champion Singer award at the 2013 Fleadh Cheoil. Since 2013, Farrell has also toured as part of the group FourWinds. In 2015, the group won the Danny Kyle Award at Celtic Connections and released their debut album.

In January 2016 he went solo at the Celtic Connections festival. His solo album True Born Irishman was released in October 2016. In 2017 he won two BBC Radio 2 Folk Awards.

== Discography ==
=== Solo ===
- 2009 – The First Turn
- 2016 – True Born Irishman
- 2019 - A Lifetime of Happiness
- 2023 - The Wedding Above In Glencree

=== FourWinds ===
- 2015 - FourWinds
