= No Deeper Blue =

Studio album by Townes Van Zandt
- Released: November 1994
- Studios: Xeric Studios, Limerick, Ireland
- Genres: Country, folk
- Length: 49:58
- Label: Sugar Hill
- Producer: Philip Donnelly

Townes Van Zandt chronology
Roadsongs (1994)	No Deeper Blue (1994)	Abnormal (1996)

Professional ratings
Review scores
Source	Rating
AllMusic	3/5 stars
Chicago Tribune	(favorable)
The New York Times	(favorable)
Rolling Stone	4/5 stars

No Deeper Blue is the tenth studio album by American singer-songwriter Townes Van Zandt. This was Van Zandt's first studio album of original songs newly recorded in the seven years following At My Window, and the last to be widely released before his death on New Year's Day in 1997.

== Recording ==
Van Zandt flew to Ireland's Xeric Studios to record the songs for No Deeper Blue, which was produced and mixed by Philip Donnelly, who had played guitar on the singer's 1978 album Flyin' Shoes. In 1994 Van Zandt explained to Aretha Sills, "I woke up in the middle of the night with a dream. You’ve got to go to Ireland and have Philip Donnelly produce your next record, and I walked out into the living room and turned on the lamp and found a piece of paper and it was Phillip’s phone number. There’s like 17 numbers, or something like that, so I just sat down, you know, and dialed the number and Phillip answered, you know, because it’s seven hours difference. I said, 'Phillip, I got a plan. How ‘bout we do this record?' That was about seven months ago, and he said, 'Oh lovely.' Right? And it all came together. Then I did about a 25-day tour through England and Ireland. I’ve heard the album a bunch of times. It’s as good as I’ve ever done, I think. Irish boys on it." Scottish singer and songwriter Donovan Leitch appears on the album playing harmonica. In the biography To Live's To Fly: The Ballad of the Late, Great Townes Van Zandt, author John Kruth suggests that "there are some wonderful touches that never would've happened if Townes hadn't hopped a plane to Ireland...The intricate accordion and fiddle fills on "Niles River Blues" recall The Band working out on a catchy Cajun waltz. Declan Masterson's uilleann pipe weaves and wheeze through Townes most surreal narrative since he crashed his silver ship against the rocks of Andilar."

== Composition ==
The album features fourteen brand new Van Zandt compositions. The singer's third wife Jeanene recalls in To Live's To Fly finding the lyrics to "A Song For" scribbled on a notepad and, after reading them, tearfully said, "Townes, this new song is so beautiful. It's bound to be my favorite," to which Van Zandt replied, "Song my ass...That's a suicide note." The album features some lighter moments, such as the comical "Billy, Boney and Ma" and the bluesy "Goin' Down To Memphis", and some heartfelt moments as well, with Van Zandt including lullabies to his two youngest children, "Hey Willy Boy" and "Katie Belle Blue" (the liner notes include a dedication "to John (JT), Will, and Katie Bell"). In a 1994 interview, Van Zandt explained to Aretha Sills, "One is for my wife called 'Lover’s Lullaby'. And one I wrote for money, about Will, who’s eleven. Got a phone call from a record company, said we’re putting together an album of lullabies. I said, 'I'm not sure I have any lullabies.' 'Well, there’s money in it.' 'Oh, Yeah! I got one. I got a good one!'

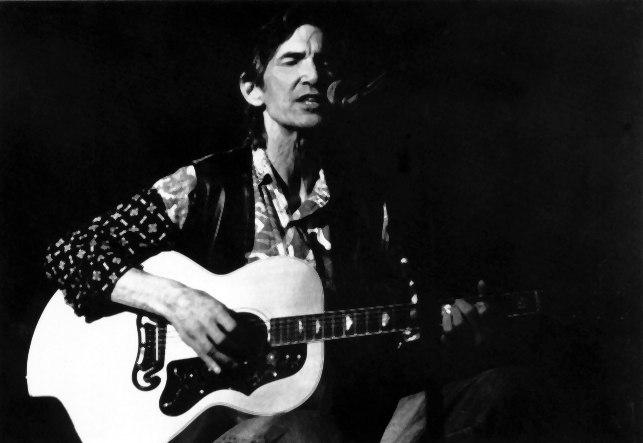
Townes Van Zandt at Kult, Niederstetten (1995)

So I sat up 'til four o’clock in the morning and wrote 'Hey Willie Boy', and it’s a really pretty song. And then 'Katie Belle Blue' I wrote from love, to put Katie Belle to sleep." However, these light-hearted songs are contrasted with "The Hole" and "Marie", some of the darkest material in the Van Zandt canon. In the 2004 biopic Be Here To Love Me, Guy Clark recalls hearing "Marie" for the first time when Van Zandt played it for him in Santa Monica where they were booked to play McCabes' Guitar Shop: "He sits down with a guitar and has this piece of paper on his knee and proceeds to play 'Marie' all the way through. He says, 'Man, I just wrote this this morning.' And I'm like (mimes disbelief), 'You're shittin' me, man!' And (he) went over across the street that night and played it – and remembered every word. I swear to God I saw him do it." Van Zandt claimed the song was inspired by Meryl Streep's character in the film Ironweed and describes the harrowing plight of a homeless couple who wind up living under a bridge until the woman dies with the protagonist's unborn child "safe inside her." Van Zandt performed the song years before he committed it to tape, but Michael Timmins of the Cowboy Junkies told John Kruth in 2007 that "it was such a disappointment the way the producer handled it. The song really got lost in that production. They should have just let the man tell his story. But I just don't think Townes cared all that much. His thing was songwriting; by the time he recorded a song, his attitude was well, whatever." Many regard the song as a milestone and a late-career masterpiece. "The Hole" was another minor-key metaphorical tale about a man's nightmarish encounter with an old hag who turns him into a toad.

== Reception ==
No Deeper Blue was released in 1994 and received generally positive reviews from critics. AllMusic writes that "The diverse musical styles made the album Van Zandt's most listenable, even when the lyrics were at their most desperate," and declared that the album "demonstrated that the muse was still with him." Biographer John Kruth believes No Deeper Blue might have benefitted from more of the singer's own instrumentation, stating in 2007, "The album's blues numbers ultimately suffer from the absence of his guitar playing, sounding a bit generic, while some of the ballads beg for his instrumental presence as well."

== Track listing ==
All songs written—and vocals—by Townes Van Zandt

1. "A Song For" – 3:00
  - Philip Donnelly (guitar), Percy Robinson (steel guitar), Sven Buick (bass), Robbie Brennan (drums), Brendan Hayes (piano), Declan Masterson (whistle)
2. "Blaze's Blues" – 3:20
  - Philip Donnelly (slide guitar, percussion), Sven Buick (bass), Robbie Brennan (drums), Brendan Hayes (piano, organ)
3. "The Hole" – 4:09
  - Philip Donnelly (electric guitar, percussion), Sven Buick (bass), Fran Breen (drums), Brendan Hayes (organ)
4. "Marie" – 4:45
  - Philip Donnelly (guitar), Percy Robinson (steel guitar), Paul Kelly (fiddle), Sven Buick (bass), Fran Breen (drums), Brendan Hayes (organ)
5. "Goin' Down to Memphis" – 4:10
  - Philip Donnelly (electric guitar), Sven Buick (bass), Fran Breen (drums), Brendan Hayes (piano, organ)
6. "Hey Willy Boy" – 2:15
  - Philip Donnelly (guitar & percussion), Sven Buick (bass), Paul Kelly (fiddle), Fran Breen (drums), Brendan Hayes (harmonium), Máirtín O'Connor (accordion)
7. "Niles River Blues" – 3:05
  - Philip Donnelly (guitar), Sven Buick (bass), Paul Kelly (fiddle), Fran Breen (drums), Brendan Hayes (barrel organ), Máirtín O'Connor (accordion)
8. "Billy, Boney and Ma" – 5:13
  - Pete Cummins (guitar), Percy Robinson (steel guitar), Sven Buick (bass), Paul Kelly (fiddle), Philip Donnelly (percussion), Fran Breen (drums), Brendan Hayes (keyboards), Declan Masterson (Uilleann pipes)
9. "Katie Belle Blue" – 3:18
  - Philip Donnelly (high-string guitar), Sven Buick (bass), Paul Kelly (fiddle), Brendan Reagan (bazouki), Brendan Hayes (baby chimes)
10. "If I Was Washington" – 2:29
  - Philip Donnelly (12-string guitar & percussion), Pete Cumins (guitar), Sven Buick (bass), Brendan Reagan (mandolin), Fran Breen (drums), Brendan Hayes (piano) Adrian Foley (Tuba)
11. "Lover's Lullaby" – 4:09
  - Philip Donnelly (acoustic & electric guitars), Percy Robinson (steel guitar), Sven Buick (bass), Fran Breen (drums), Brendan Hayes (organ)
12. "Cowboy Junkies Lament" – 3:18 (written for the band formed in 1986)
  - Philip Donnelly (acoustic & electric guitars), Percy Robinson (steel guitar), Sven Buick (bass), Fran Breen (drums), Brendan Hayes (organ)
13. "BW Railroad Blues" – 3:52
  - Philip Donnelly (acoustic & electric guitars and percussion), Sven Buick (bass), Fran Breen (drums), Donovan (harmonica), Brendan Hayes (organ)
14. "Gone Too Long" – 2:55
  - Townes Van Zandt (guitar), Philip Donnelly (electric guitar), Sven Buick (bass), Fran Breen (drums), Donovan (harmonica), Brendan Hayes (piano, organ)

== Personnel ==
=== Production ===
- Record producer by Philip Donnelly
- Executive producer – Jeanene Van Zandt
- Recorded by Pearse Gilmore
  at Xeric Studios, Limerick, Ireland
- Studio coordinator – Edel Ni Dhuinn
- Guitar technician – Joe Browne
- Project agent – Harold Eggers
- Mastered by Paul Solomons
  at Porky's Mastering, LTD., London, England

=== Artwork ===
- Album cover painting — "Snake Eyes" by Jeanette (Jet) Whitt
- Photography – Anthony Lathrop
- Design – Anthony Lathrop, Jeanene Van Zandt and CC Design

== Releases ==
year	format	label	catalog #
1994	CD	Sugar Hill	1046
1994	cassette	Sugar Hill	1046
