= Other Voices, Other Rooms (Nanci Griffith album) =

Studio album by Nanci Griffith
- Released: March 2, 1993
- Recorded: August–December 1992
- Genre: Country folk
- Length: 62:08
- Label: Elektra
- Producer: Jim Rooney

Nanci Griffith chronology
Late Night Grande Hotel (1991)	Other Voices, Other Rooms (1993)	Flyer (1994)

Professional ratings
Review scores
Source	Rating
AllMusic	4.5/5 stars
Chicago Tribune	4/4 stars
Robert Christgau	(dud)
Los Angeles Times	3/4 stars
NME	(7/10)
Rolling Stone	3/5 stars

Other Voices, Other Rooms (stylized as Other Voices | Other Rooms) is the 10th studio album by American singer Nanci Griffith. It was released on March 2, 1993, by Elektra Records. Her first since leaving MCA Records, it consisted entirely of cover songs, in tribute to songwriters who influenced her own songwriting. Guest artists who appear in their own compositions included Frank Christian playing guitar on "Three Flights Up", Bob Dylan playing harmonica on "Boots of Spanish Leather", and John Prine lending harmony vocals on "Speed of the Sound of Loneliness". The album was titled after the Truman Capote novel of the same name.

The album rose to the number 54 position on the Billboard Pop Albums chart in 1993, although it had no charting singles. The album concept was inspired by the 1990 album True Voices, which was also made up of cover songs, including one that Griffith recorded on Other Voices, Other Rooms – "Across the Great Divide", written by Kate Wolf. Other Voices, Other Rooms was certified gold by the RIAA on January 30, 2005, signifying shipments of 500,000 units in the United States.

In 1998, Griffith released a sequel album titled Other Voices, Too (A Trip Back to Bountiful).

== Track listing ==
No.	Title	Writer(s)	Length
1.	"Across the Great Divide" (with Emmylou Harris)	Kate Wolf	3:57
2.	"Woman of the Phoenix" (with James Hooker)	Vince Bell	2:41
3.	"Tecumseh Valley" (with Arlo Guthrie)	Townes Van Zandt	4:29
4.	"Three Flights Up"	Frank Christian	3:31
5.	"Boots of Spanish Leather"	Bob Dylan	5:17
6.	"Speed of the Sound of Loneliness" (with John Prine)	John Prine	4:20
7.	"From Clare to Here" (with Pete Cummins)	Ralph McTell	5:11
8.	"Can't Help but Wonder Where I'm Bound" (with Carolyn Hester)	Tom Paxton	3:16
9.	"Do-Re-Mi" (with Guy Clark)	Woody Guthrie	2:52
10.	"This Old Town"	Janis Ian, Jon Vezner	3:00
11.	"Comin' Down in the Rain" (with Lee Satterfield)	Buddy Mondlock	3:45
12.	"Ten Degrees and Getting Colder" (with Iris DeMent)	Gordon Lightfoot	2:40
13.	"Morning Song for Sally"	Jerry Jeff Walker	4:55
14.	"Night Rider's Lament" (with Don Edwards)	Michael Burton	3:57
15.	"Are You Tired of Me Darling?" (with Iris DeMent and Emmylou Harris)	G.P. Cook, Ralph Rolan	3:11
16.	"Turn Around"	Malvina Reynolds, Harry Belafonte, Alan Greene	3:19
17.	"Wimoweh" (with Odetta, Indigo Girls, Kennedy Rose, John Prine, James Hooker, Holly & Barry Tashian, John Gorka, Dave Mallett, Marlin Griffith (Nanci's father), Jim Rooney)	Solomon Linda (miscredited in liner notes as "Traditional South African")	1:47

== Awards and recognition ==
Griffith won the 1994 Grammy Award for Best Contemporary Folk Album, and producer Jim Rooney won a Grammy Award for production.

== Personnel ==
- Nanci Griffith – lead vocal (except 17), guitar, harmony vocals (throughout)
- Pete Kennedy – lead acoustic guitar (throughout)
- Stuart Duncan – mandolin, violin (throughout)
- Pat McInerney – percussion (throughout)
- Fran Breen – drums, percussion (throughout)
- Chet Atkins – guitar (15, 16)
- John Catchings – cello (2, 16)
- Frank Christian – guitar (2–5, 13)
- Guy Clark – guitar, vocals (9)
- Pete Cummins – harmony vocals, guitar (7)
- Iris DeMent – vocals, harmony vocals, guitar (12, 15)
- Philip Donnelly – guitar (6–8, 10)
- Bob Dylan – harmonica (5)
- Béla Fleck – banjo (10)
- Pat Flynn – guitar (9, 12)
- Arlo Guthrie – harmony vocals, guitar (3)
- Emmylou Harris – harmony vocals, guitar (1, 15)
- John Hartford – banjo, vocals (17)
- Carolyn Hester – harmony vocals (8)
- James Hooker – harmony vocal, organ, piano, keyboards
- Roy M. "Junior" Husky – bass (9, 17)
- Lee Satterfield – guitar, harmony vocals (2, 11)
- Mary Ann Kennedy – percussion, vocals (17)
- Leo Kottke – guitar (17)
- Alison Krauss – violin (2)
- Edgar Meyer – bass (2)
- Odetta – lead vocal (17)
- David Mallett, John Gorka, Marlin Griffith, Amy Ray, Emily Saliers, Pamela Rose, Holly Tashian, Barry Tashian, Jim Rooney – vocals (17)
- Don Edwards – yodeling (14)
- John Prine – vocals, harmony vocals (6, 17)
- Andrea Zonn – viola (2)

== Charts ==
Chart (1993)	Peak position
European Albums (Eurotipsheet)	35
Irish Albums (IFPI)	6
Norwegian Albums (VG-lista)	10
UK Albums (Official Charts)	18
UK Country Albums (Official Charts)	13
US Billboard 200	54
