= Johnie Scot =

Traditional song

Johnie Scot (Roud 63, Child 99) is a traditional English-language folk ballad.

== Synopsis ==
Johnie Scot served the king of England and got his daughter pregnant. The king threw her in prison to starve. One day, back in Scotland, he sent a shirt to his love, and she sent back a letter with the news. He raised a force and came to her rescue.

== Variants ==
This ballad closely parallels Child ballad 100, Willie o Winsbury.
