= Fleadh Cowboys =

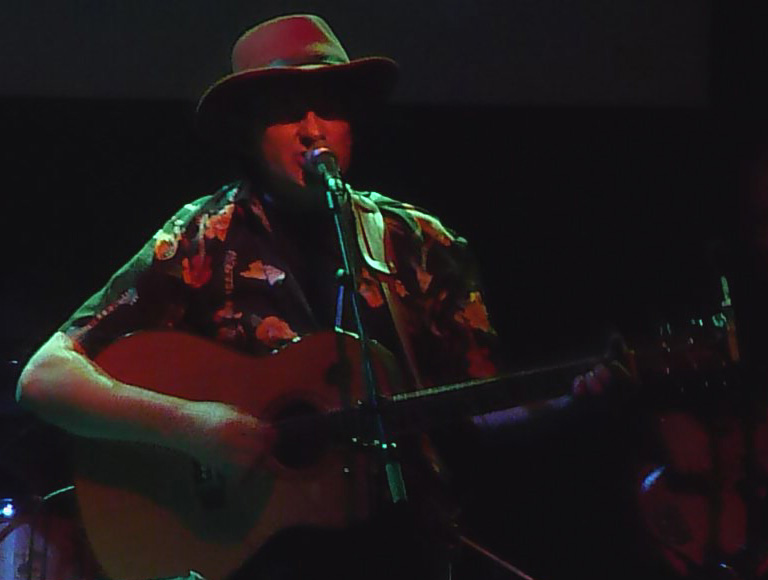
- Frankie Lane playing with the Fleadh Cowboys on Bob Dylan's birthday, Dublin, 2011

Background information
- Origin: Dublin Ireland
- Genres: Folk rock Rock; Country
- Years active: 1984–1990; 1997–present
- Members: Pete Cummins; Frankie Lane; Tommy Moore; Paul Kelly; Trevor Knight; Fran Breen; Ger Kiely
- Past members: Johnny Moynihan; Jimmy Faulkner; Garvan Gallagher; Phil Donnelly; Peter Condell

The Fleadh Cowboys are a Dublin-based folk-rock/country band.

The Fleadh Cowboys were formed in 1985 by Johnny Moynihan, Pete Cummins and Frankie Lane, in Kenny's pub in Westland Row in Dublin. They recruited Jimmy Faulkner on electric guitar and Garvan Gallagher on bass and along with Fran Breen on drums they moved to The Harcourt Hotel on Harcourt Street.

Adding Phil Donnelly and Paul Kelly amongst others, they had a long-running residency in Dublin's Olympia Theatre. The band established a format where every week a guest or guests would join them on stage. Guests at the venue included Mary Coughlan, Shane MacGowan, The Waterboys, The Hothouse Flowers, Nanci Griffith, John Prine and Joe Ely.

The Fleadhs toured with Bob Dylan, The Pogues, The Waterboys and Emmylou Harris.

The band broke up in 1990 though they later reformed for gigs and to record. The individual musicians continued to play and record in different formations. Paul Kelly and Frankie Lane, accompanied by Eleanor Shanley, play and tour together in Ireland and throughout Europe. Pete Cummins (the band's main songwriter) released his debut solo album The Brilliant Architect in 2008 to critical acclaim. His anti-war song "Flowers in Baghdad" was in the Neil Young anti-war charts Living with War, for almost two years. He continues to tour with guitarist Ger Kiely.

In May 2011 the band was reformed by Pete Cummins to organize a charity event at Dublin's Button Factory, with guests Lisa Hannigan, Gay Woods, Liam Ó Maonlaí, Henry McCullough, Siobhán O'Brien, Mundy, Tír na nÓg and others.

On 3 March 2013, Pete Cummins once again reformed the band this time to honor one of its own past members Guitarist Henry McCullouhg. Henry suffered a heart attack in Dec 2012 and died in March 2013. Artists who contributed were The Fleadh Cowboys, Christy Moore, Sweeny's Men, Mick Spillane, Johnny Duhan, Honor Heffernan, James Delaney, Philip Donnelly, Mick Flannery, Ed Deane Band, Siobhan O Brien, Sara Petite, Victor McCullough, Alan Murphy, Kevin Doherty. Compares were BP Fallon and Ronan Collins.

== Discography ==
- "Johnny da Vinci" (1987 single)
- High Ace to Heaven (1988)
- Time of Your Life (1997)
