= Mister Fred's Round Pegs and Bass Peeps =

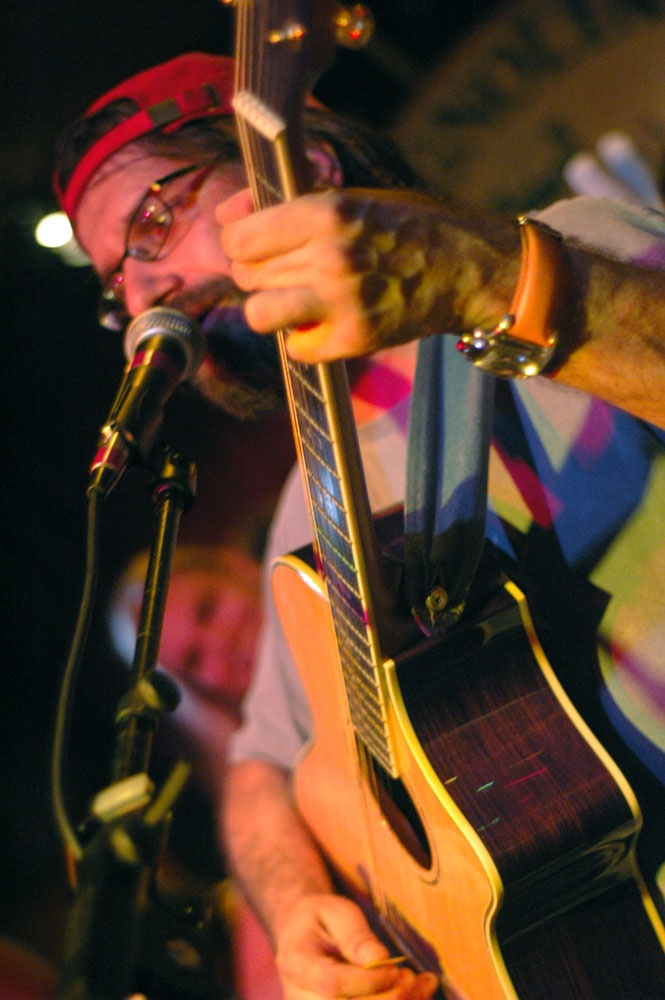
- P.H. Fred with the Round Pegs live at Chickie Wah Wah in New Orleans, Sep. 19, 2009

Background information
- Origin: New Orleans, Louisiana
- Genres: Rock, blues, folk
- Labels: Notthat Records
- Website: www.phfred.com

Mister Fred's Round Pegs and Bass Peeps is an all-star musical ensemble led by New Orleans writer and performer P.H. (PH) Fred, who is best known for the Dr. Demento tune “Kill Barney” and his tenure with BROWN! Improv alongside Ken Jeong. The group's debut CD, Lithium and Underoos, is a folk opera loosely based on Fred's battles with manic depression post-Katrina.

Mister Fred's Round Pegs and Bass Peeps also features guitarist Steve Hunter and bassist Fernando Saunders, both Lou Reed alumni. Other Bass Peeps include Jimmy Messa (The Subdudes), George Porter Jr. (The Meters), and Mike Watt (Minutemen, Firehose, The Stooges).

A live version of the band performs in New Orleans under the abbreviated name The Round Pegs.

The band is currently finishing up its second full-length CD N.O.Americana. Hunter, Saunders, and Watt are all involved in the project.

== Discography ==
- Lithium and Underoos (2010) – Notthat Records
- "Emo Emu" (single, 2012) – Notthat Records
- Pack Up Your Bags: The 99¢ E.P. (2013) – Notthat Records
- Miss You E.P. (2014) - Notthat Records
- N.O. Americana (2014) - Notthat Records

PH Fred (solo)

- Kill Barney & Other Delights (1995)- Candy Jack Records
- Dirty Martini (2001) - Candyjack/OTB
- Adventure of Blue Tarp and Black Mold (2006) - Notthat Records
- Menagerie: 50 Years of Fred (2014) - Notthat Records/OTB Joint
