= Eleanor Shanley =

Irish Roots musician

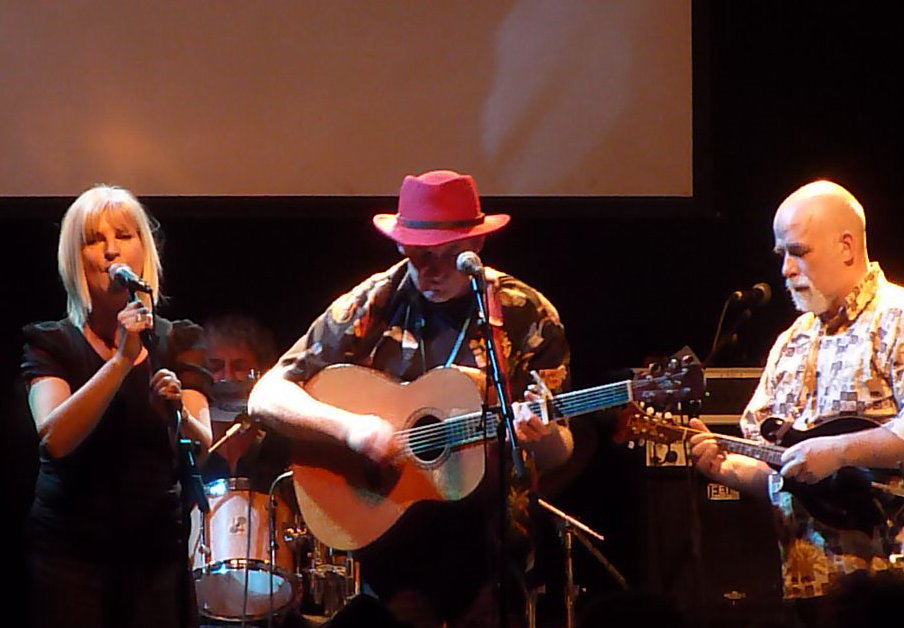
Eleanor Shanley, Frankie Lane and Paul Kelly, Dublin 2011

Eleanor Shanley is an Irish Roots musician, from Keshcarrigan in County Leitrim in the North West of Ireland.

== Early life ==
Shanley was born into a musical family and comes from a line of traditional singers. After finishing school she moved to Dublin. During the day she worked in FAS, the state recruitment agency; in the evenings she studied drama with Betty Ann Norton and joined the "Leitrim Wild Roses" Tops of the Town group. She also sang in various sessions, mainly in Ned O'Sheas "Merchant". It was there that she met De Dannan.

== Career ==
She made her first appearance as a singer with traditional group De Danann in 1990, and sang with them for five years She went on to sing with Ronnie Drew. She had also toured with Christy Moore and Sharon Shannon as a soloist both in Ireland and abroad.

Shanley has recorded with Ronnie Drew, Sharon Shannon, Eddi Reader, Tommy Fleming, Desmond O'Halloran, Dolores Keane, Christie Hennessy and The Dubliners.

Her cover version of the Thomas Moore classic Gorgeous and Bright was the most played track on RTE 1 Radio in the summer of 2015.

Her current collaborators are Frankie Lane and Paul Kelly, with whom she has performed since 2002.

== Personal life ==
Shanley lives with her partner Brendan Harding in Ballinasloe, Co. Galway.

== Collaborations ==
- Tommy Fleming's Restless Spirit album.
- De Danann's How the West was Won.
- Dubliners' 30 Years a Greying
- Frankie Lane's Gunsmoke at El Paso.
- With Frankie Lane and Paul Kelly: A Place of My Own
- Ronnie Drew on albums "“A Couple More Years" and "El Amor De Mi Vida"
