= Johnny Moynihan =

Irish folk singer, based in Dublin (born 1946)

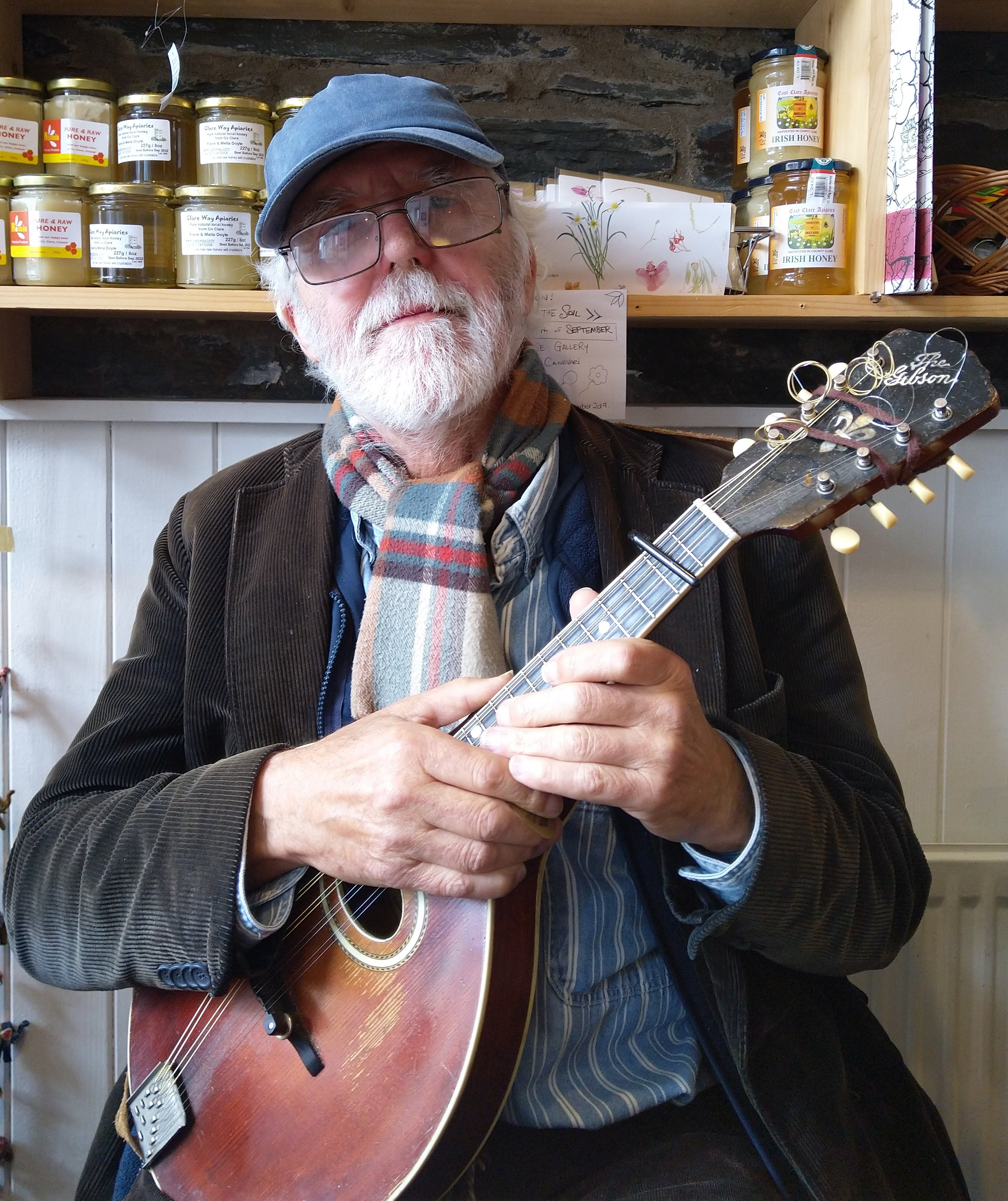
- Moynihan with a pre-war Gibson mandolin

Background information
- Birth name: John Moynihan
- Born: 29 October 1946 (age 78)
- Origin: Phibsboro, Dublin, Ireland
- Genres: Folk, traditional Irish
- Occupation(s): Musician, singer
- Instrument(s): Vocals, fiddle, mandolin, bouzouki, tin whistle, harmonica, and button accordion
- Years active: 1960s–present

John Moynihan (born 29 October 1946, Phibsboro) is an Irish folk singer, based in Dublin. He is often credited with introducing the bouzouki into Irish music in the mid-1960s.

== Music career ==
=== Sweeney's Men ===
Known as "The Bard of Dalymount", he was a co-founder of the band Sweeney's Men with Andy Irvine and 'Galway Joe' Dolan (who was later replaced by Terry Woods). Sweeney's Men broke the mould of Irish music and are credited with starting the folk revival there in the late 1960s.

The most famous innovation of Sweeney's Men is probably Moynihan's introduction of the bouzouki, originally a Greek instrument, into Irish music, albeit with a different tuning: GDAD' (one octave lower than the open-tuned mandolin), instead of the modern Greek tuning of CFAD'. However, the original three-course bouzouki used in early Rebetika was also tuned DAD.

In his book, The Humours of Planxty, Leagues O'Toole documented that Moynihan bought his first bouzouki from a friend called Tony Ffrench, who had brought it back to Ireland from Greece but decided he couldn't play it, or didn't want to. At first, the other Sweeney's weren't too keen on Moynihan's new instrument, until the evening when he and Irvine worked out an intricate harmony for bouzouki and mandolin while rehearsing Rattlin' Roarin' Willy: Later, Moynihan swapped this Greek, round back bouzouki for a pre-war Gibson mandolin. During a subsequent trip to London, he bought a flat back bouzouki from instrument maker John Bailey, who had made it as an experiment after measuring an authentic bouzouki in one of London's Greek restaurants.

The group made two albums, Sweeney's Men and The Tracks of Sweeney. The latter was recorded without Irvine, who had gone travelling in the Balkans.

=== Planxty, De Dannan and Fleadh Cowboys ===
In 1973, Moynihan briefly joined Planxty for their album Cold Blow and the Rainy Night. After Planxty, Moynihan replaced Irvine in De Dannan in 1976 and can be heard on their second album, Selected Jigs, Reels & Songs, released in 1977 but never re-issued on CD.

Also in 1976, he recorded with Maddy Prior & June Tabor (the Silly Sisters) and with Tony Hall.

For a time, he also fronted the Fleadh Cowboys, a popular band in 1980s Dublin.

=== Solo gigs and Moonshine ===
In 2006, Moynihan could also often be seen playing old-time Appalachian music with a trio based in east-Clare and calling themselves 'Frankie, Johnny and Sweetheart' (a pun on the song title Frankie and Johnny). The other members were Swedish Lena Ullmann on clawhammer banjo and American Frank Hall on fiddle; in 2007, they renamed themselves Moonshine.

=== Reunions ===
Moynihan reunited with Irvine for a one-off concert in Galway in 2001. It was considered doubtful if he and Irvine would ever play together again.

However, they reunited once more, this time billed as Sweeney's Men, for a one-off gig in Rostrevor, County Down on 22 July 2007, with Paul Brady deputising for Joe Dolan who was unwell. Another Sweeney's Men reunion took place when Moynihan, Irvine and Woods performed together again on 16 and 17 June 2012, as part of Irvine's 70th birthday concerts at Vicar Street, in Dublin. It worked so well that they resumed gigging regularly in Ireland during late 2012 and again in 2013.

The world of Moynihan and Sweeney's Men is best summed up in Andy Irvine's song My Heart's Tonight in Ireland from his Rain on the Roof album, available from Irvine's own website. More information about Moynihan and his career with Sweeney's Men and Planxty can be found in O'Toole's book.

== Personal life ==
He was famously associated with the folk singer Anne Briggs in the mid-1960s and both of them traded off their mutual inclination for wild behaviour. He plays backing bouzouki on several Anne Briggs songs on her album, The Time Has Come.

== Selected discography ==
With Sweeney's Men

- Sweeney's Men (1968)
- The Tracks of Sweeney (1969)
- Andy Irvine/70th Birthday Concert at Vicar St 2012 (2014)

With Anne Briggs

- Anne Briggs (1971)

With Planxty

- Cold Blow and the Rainy Night (1974)

With Maddy Prior & June Tabor

- Silly Sisters (1976)

With Tony Hall

- Fieldvole Music (1976)

With De Danann

- Selected Jigs, Reels & Songs (1977)

With Fleadh Cowboys

- High Ace to Heaven (1988)
- Time of Your Life (1997)

With Moonshine

- First Run (2007)

== Filmography ==
- Andy Irvine 70th Birthday Concert at Vicar St 2012 (2014), DVD
