= Sweeney's Men =

Irish traditional band

- Origin: Dublin, Ireland
- Genres: Folk, Traditional Irish
- Years active: 1966–1969, 2012–present
- Labels: Pye, Transatlantic
- Members: Andy Irvine; Johnny Moynihan; Terry Woods
- Past members: "Galway Joe" Dolan; Henry McCullough; Al O'Donnell

Sweeney's Men was an Irish traditional band. They emerged from the mid-1960s Irish roots revival, along with groups such as The Dubliners and the Clancy Brothers. The founding line-up in May 1966 was Johnny Moynihan, Andy Irvine and "Galway Joe" Dolan.

== First line-up ==
Before creating the band in 1966, Irvine, Moynihan and Dolan had met in Dublin and had performed and travelled together, on and off, around Ireland; Irvine and Dolan hitch-hiked together around Europe (Munich, Vienna and Rome) in late 1965.

The name 'Sweeney's Men' was inspired by Dolan's reading of Flann O'Brien's comic novel At Swim-Two-Birds, which depicts the mad, anti-religious, tree-leaping pagan King Sweeney of Antrim.

The band's manager was Eamonn O'Doherty, and he and the band travelled in a red VW van. The band often travelled to Milltown Malbay to enjoy musical sessions with the piper Willie Clancy. The early days of the band have been described by Irvine in his song "My heart's tonight in Ireland".

== Second line-up ==
In June 1967, Dolan decided to travel to Israel to fight in the Six-Day War and was replaced by Terry Woods. Woods, who played the 12-string guitar, had travelled in the US and studied the American folk tradition, brought an American musical influence to the group.

At the time, they played the bouzouki, mandolin, guitar, tin whistle, harmonica, concertina and 5-string banjo. This line-up recorded their first full-length album, Sweeney's Men, in 1968.

The band did not stick to Irish songs exclusively, since all three were big fans of American music and their repertoire included American songs like "Tom Dooley" alongside traditional songs like "Willy O'Winsbury" from the Scottish tradition. Irvine left the band in May 1968, to travel around Eastern Europe.

== Third line-up ==
Irvine was replaced by Henry McCullough, who had been repatriated to Ireland while on an Eire Apparent tour, owing to visa problems. McCullough played electric guitar, and his tenure saw the band explore more progressive, psychedelic territory. After playing with Sweeney's Men at the Cambridge Folk Festival, McCullough left in July 1968 to join Joe Cocker's Grease Band, and was briefly replaced by Al O'Donnell (born Alastair Noel O'Donnell, 8 December 1943, Harold's Cross, Dublin, County Dublin, Ireland, died 3 September 2015, Rathdrum, County Wicklow, Ireland).

== Final line-up ==
It was as a duo that Woods and Moynihan recorded the band's second, and final, album The Tracks of Sweeney, released in 1969 and including some of their own compositions, such as Moynihan's "Standing on the Shore". Shortly after this release, they broke up, on 22 November 1969. A new Irish-English folk super-group was almost formed in 1970, with Moynihan, Irvine (now back from his travels), Woods and his wife Gay, plus Ashley Hutchings joining on bass, but this never happened.

== Break-up and follow-on projects ==
Following the break-up of Sweeney's Men, four of the members played in other notable bands:

- Andy Irvine: Planxty, Patrick Street, East Wind, Mozaik, LAPD, Usher's Island, and several duos (with Dónal Lunny, Paul Brady, Mick Hanly, Dick Gaughan, Rens van der Zalm and Luke Plumb) while also pursuing a solo career.
- Johnny Moynihan: Planxty, De Dannan, Fleadh Cowboys, Moonshine, solo career and with Anne Briggs and Andrew McNamara.
- Terry Woods: Steeleye Span, Gay & Terry Woods, The Woods Band and The Pogues.
- Henry McCullough: The Grease Band and Wings.

== Reunions ==
In 1986, Moynihan, Woods and McCullough reunited for a special edition of the BP Fallon Orchestra, a radio show hosted by Dave Fanning of RTÉ Radio.

Irvine and Moynihan were re-united for a one-off gig as Sweeney's Men in Rostrevor, County Down on 22 July 2007, when the band was inducted into the Hall of Fame of the local Fiddler's Green Festival; Dolan was unable to participate due to illness, so Paul Brady agreed to deputise. Irvine wrote "Had hoped we might 'blague' Galway Joe Dolan into doing it but he hasn't been on a stage for about two lifetimes and that wasn't going to work. Johnny had hit on the great idea of asking Paul Brady to play with us as Paul had stood in for Dolan at a gig in Limerick in 1967 after Joe's speedy departure for Israel and the 6 Day War".

Irvine, Moynihan and Woods played together once again on 16 & 17 June 2012, as part of Irvine's 70th Birthday party concerts at Vicar Street in Dublin, a dozen tracks from the shows were released by Irvine as a live album. It worked so well that they gigged again in Ireland later in 2012 and also played five full-house gigs in Galway, Kilkenny, Cork, Dublin and Limerick during November 2013. Their play list included some new songs as well as old standards, in performances that demonstrated that they retain their old vitality and virtuosity across a wide range of instruments.

== Legacy ==
A significant innovation that Sweeney's Men contributed to Irish music was Moynihan's introduction of the bouzouki, with the tuning of GDAD', one octave lower than the open-tuned mandolin instead of the traditional Greek tuning of CFAD'.

For a band with such a short lifespan, their influence was considerable. Thanks largely to Irvine, they helped evolve a more structured approach to the accompaniment of ballads. Irvine's interaction with Moynihan's bouzouki playing initially, and then with Donal Lunny's up to and including Planxty, consolidated this contrapuntal approach.

== Discography ==
Original releases

- "Old Maid in the Garrett"/"The Derby Ram", 1967; 7" single (Pye 7N 17312)
- "Waxie's Dargle"/"Old Woman in Cotton", 1968; 7" single (Pye 7N 17459)
- Compilation EP, featuring all four songs from first two singles (Pye Mini Monster Series EP PMM.608)
- "Sullivan's John"/"Rattlin' Roarin' Willy", 1969; 7" single (Transatlantic TRASP 19)
- Sweeney's Men, 1968; LP (Transatlantic TRA170)
- The Tracks of Sweeney, 1969; LP (Transatlantic TRA 200)

Anthologies

- Time Was Never Here, 1992; CD with both albums but missing The Exile's Jig and Dicey Riley (Demon TDEMCD11)
- Sweeneys Men/The Tracks of Sweeney,1996; CD with both albums plus Old Woman in Cotton (Essential ESMCD 435)
- The Legend of Sweeney's Men, 2004; Double-CD with all studio recordings plus several extras (Castle Music, CMDD932).

Compilations/Featured

- Andy Irvine/70th Birthday Concert at Vicar St 2012, 2014; CD/Digital (AK-5)

== Filmography ==
- Andy Irvine 70th Birthday Concert at Vicar St 2012 (2014), DVD

== Bibliography ==
- Irvine, Andy Aiming for the Heart – Poetic Songs From Ireland, Heupferd Musik, 1988, ISBN 3-923445-01-6
- O'Toole, Leagues The Humours of Planxty, Hachette Books Ireland, 2006, ISBN 0-340-83797-7
