= "Galway Joe" Dolan =

Irish musician, song-writer and artist

Joseph "Galway Joe" Dolan (25 May 1942 – 7 January 2008) was an Irish musician, songwriter and artist. Known as "Galway Joe" to distinguish him from Joe Dolan of Mullingar, he was born in Galway, County Galway, Ireland.

Dolan was an arts student in Dublin before becoming involved in the Irish showbands of the 1960s, playing guitar with The Capitol Showband and The Swingtime Aces.

He is best known as one of the three founding members, together with Andy Irvine and Johnny Moynihan, of the highly influential folk group Sweeney's Men, which was formed in Galway in May 1966; Dolan also chose the group's name. Sweeney's Men invigorated the Irish folk scene, and had an unexpected Irish top 10 hit with "Old Maid in the Garret" in 1967.

The week "Old Maid in the Garret" was in the Top Ten, Dolan left the band to go to Israel with the intention of taking part in the Six-Day War. Later on, Des Kelly—Sweeney's Men's manager—joked that Dolan had arrived on the seventh day, "but it took him a year to get down there". He wrote the song "The Trip to Jerusalem" about his journey there, which was later recorded by Christy Moore in 1978 on the album The Iron Behind the Velvet.

In that album's sleeve notes, Moore quoted Dolan's explanation of the genesis of the song:

I wrote this song in my salad days (back in 1965) [sic] when I worked on an archeological expedition to Masada in the Negev desert. I was on general duty on top of the mountain with a walkie-talkie and a weapon and the temperature was about 120 degrees in the shade. I was thinking of how I'd got there.

—Sleeve notes from The Iron Behind the Velvet.

His song "The Foxy Devil" was also recorded by Moore on the same album. The Dubliners covered "Nelson's Farewell", which was a hit in Ireland, and the trio Ardvarna released a beautiful version of "Mayfly Days".

Dolan subsequently dropped professional music in favour of painting, but continued to compose and would pass on tapes to anyone who was interested. He continued to play in local sessions.

== Death ==
Dolan died of cancer in January 2008, survived by his son Andy, sister Chris (Christine), brother-in-law Wim, and nieces Eileen and Jessica. His autobiography, Lost Miles and Broken Strings, has not yet been published.
