= Bruce Molsky =

American fiddler, banjo player, guitarist, and singer

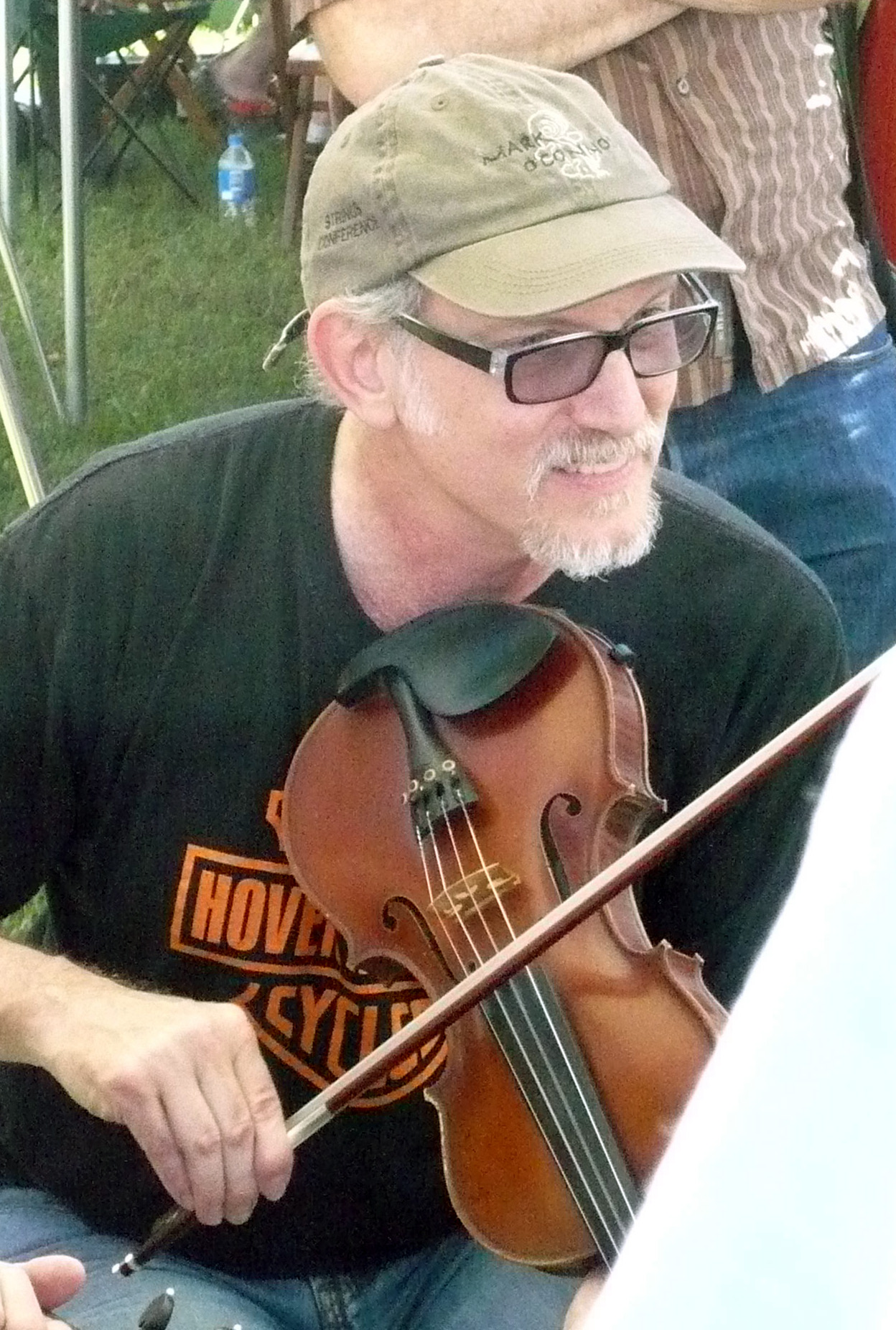
- Bruce Molsky playing the fiddle in 2009

Background information
- Born: Bruce C. Molsky; 1955 (age 70–71); New York City
- Genres: old-time
- Occupation: Musician
- Instruments: Vocals, fiddle, banjo, guitar
- Labels: Compass, Rounder, Tree Frog, Marimac
- Website: www.brucemolsky.com

Bruce C. Molsky (born 1955, New York City) is an American fiddler, banjo player, guitarist, and singer. He primarily performs old-time music of the Appalachian region.

== Early years ==
As a young man, Molsky first became interested in blues music, but eventually became absorbed in old-time music while studying engineering at Cornell University in Ithaca, New York, beginning in 1972. His playing was influenced by the fiddling of Tommy Jarrell, whom Molsky visited in North Carolina in 1976. He recorded with Bob Carlin in 1990.

== Career ==
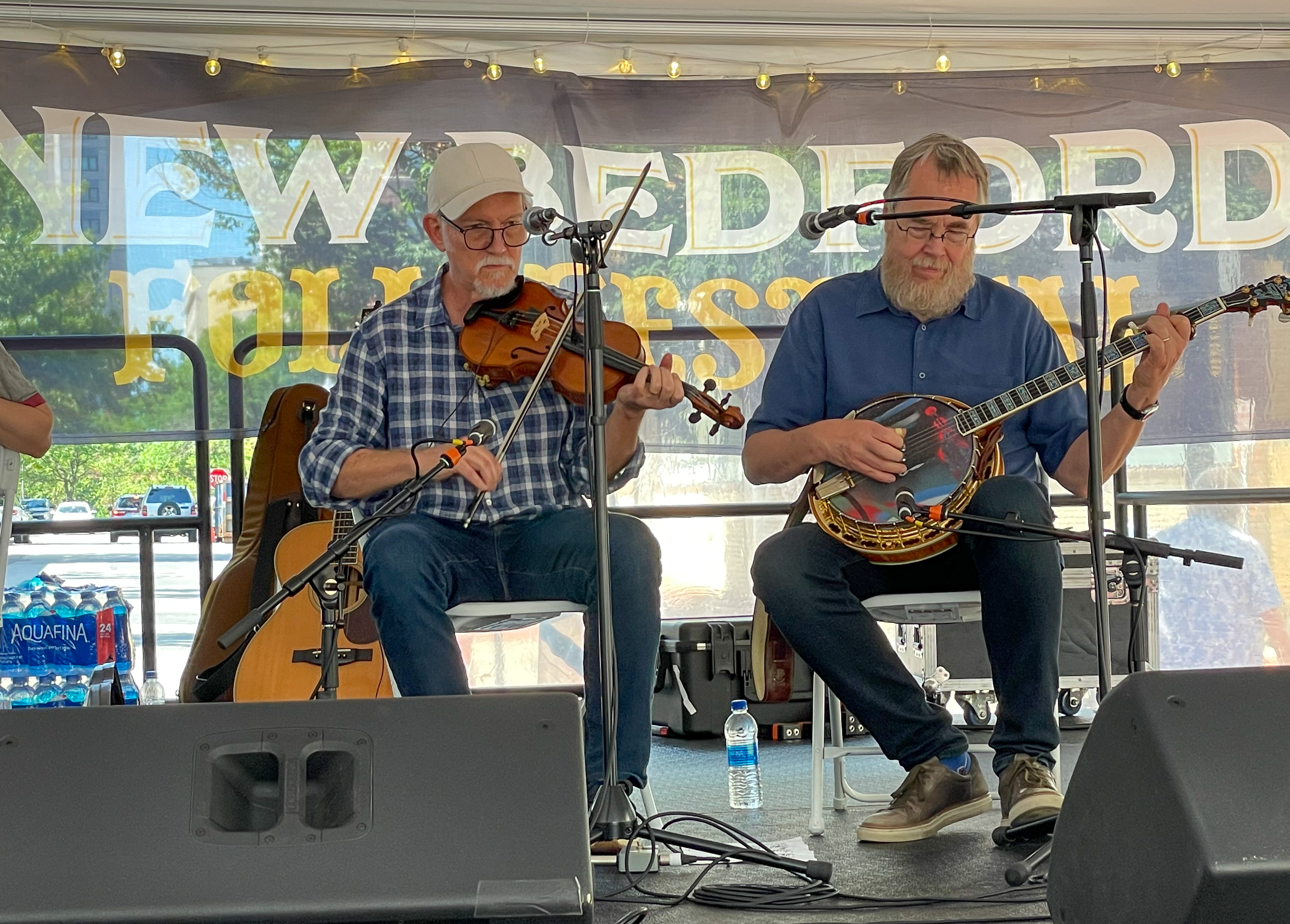
Bruce Molsky (L) and Tony Trischka 2022 New Bedford Folk Festival

Molsky has released several records on Compass Records, Rounder Records and Tree Frog Music under his own name. Besides his solo recordings, he has also played in Fiddlers 4, with Darol Anger, Michael Doucet (violins) and Rushad Eggleston (cello). Since 2002, he has been a founding member of Andy Irvine & Dónal Lunny's Mozaik.

In 2008, Molsky collaborated with Norwegian hardingfele player and composer Annbjørg Lien on her album Waltz With Me and accompanied her in subsequent concerts. He also appeared as a guest artist on Andy Statman's 2011 double-CD, Old Brooklyn (Shefa Records). He played banjo, fiddle, guitar and sang on Anonymous 4’s album 1865: Songs of Hope and Home from the American Civil War, released in 2015. Molsky was a guest on Mark Knopfler's 2015 album Tracker, playing banjo, fiddle and guitar.

Molsky is a member of the faculty at the Berklee College of Music, American Roots Music Program, in Boston.

== Personal life ==
Molsky and his wife Audrey reside in Beacon, New York. He enjoys baking and began a Facebook group during the pandemic called "Fiddle and Dough." Molsky has collected fountain pens for many years.

== Discography ==
Solo

- Warring Cats (Yodel At Hee, 1993)
- Lost Boy (Rounder 0361, 1996)
- Poor Man's Troubles (Rounder Select 82161-0470-2, 2000)
- Southern Old Time Fiddle Tour 2 (Tree Frog Music TF-002, 2003)
- Southern Old-Time Fiddle Tour (Tree Frog Music TF001CD, 2003)
- Contented Must Be (Rounder Select 82161-0534-2, 2004)
- Soon Be Time (Compass Records 7 4432 2, 2006)
- If It Ain't Here When I Get Back (Tree Frog Music, 2013)
- Can’t Stay Here This Way (Tiki Parlour Recordings 006, 2016)
- Everywhere You Go (guitar album) (Tiki Parlour Recordings, 2022)

With Big Hoedown

- Bruce Molsky and Big Hoedown (Rounder 0421, 1997)

With Bob Carlin

- Take Me As I Am (Marimac, 1989)

With Fiddlers 4

- Bruce Molsky / Michael Doucet / Darol Anger / Rushad Eggleston – Fiddlers 4 (Compass Records 7 4334 2, 2002)

With Aly Bain and Ale Möller

- Meeting Point (Live At Liverpool Philharmonic) (Whirlie WHIRLIECD34, 2013)

With Anonymous

- 1865 (Harmonia Mundi, 2015)

With Ånon Egeland and Arto Järvelä

- Rambles (OArt Music MMXIII OArtCD9, 2016)

With Darol Anger

- Lockdown Breakdown (Tree Frog Music TF2401, 2024)
