= Irish bouzouki =

Type of stringed instrument

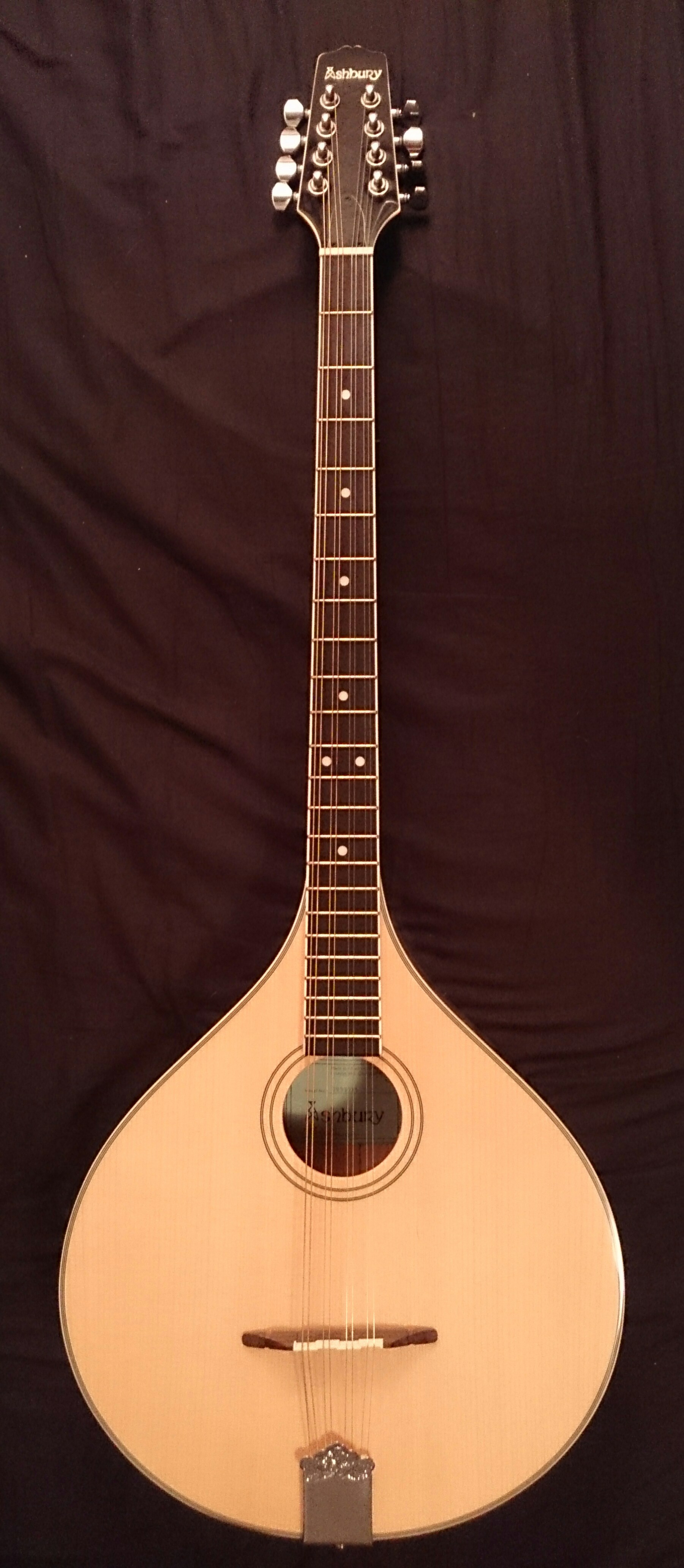
- Classification: String instrument (plucked)
- Hornbostel–Sachs classification: 321.322 (necked box lutes)
- Inventor: Dónal Lunny
- Developed: 20th century

Related instruments
- List: Bouzouki; Cittern; Mandolin; Octave mandolin

Musicians
- List: James Fagan; Daoirí Farrell; Andy Irvine; Dónal Lunny; Manus Lunny; Johnny Moynihan; Beth Patterson; Benji Kirkpatrick

The Irish bouzouki (Irish: búsúcaí) is an adaptation of the Greek bouzouki (Greek: μπουζούκι). The newer Greek tetrachordo bouzouki (4 courses of strings) was introduced into Irish traditional music in the mid-1960s by Johnny Moynihan of the folk group Sweeney's Men, who retuned it from its traditional Greek tuning C_{3}F_{3}A_{3}D_{4} to G_{2}D_{3}A_{3}D_{4}, a tuning he had pioneered previously on the mandolin. Alec Finn, first in the Cana Band and subsequently in De Dannan, introduced the first Greek trichordo (3 course) bouzouki into Irish music.

In the early 1970s, Andy Irvine, who was a member of Sweeney's Men with Johnny Moynihan, gave a Greek tetrachordo bouzouki to Dónal Lunny, who replaced the octave strings on the two lower G and D courses with unison strings, thus reinforcing their lower frequencies. Soon after, on a visit with Irvine to the workshop of luthier Peter Abnett, Lunny commissioned a four-course bouzouki with a three-piece, partially staved back. This was the first bouzouki built specifically for Irish music. Since then, the instrument has been adapted by many instrument builders for Irish traditional and other styles of folk music.

== Present role in Irish music ==
With a few exceptions, instrumentalists playing the bouzouki in Irish music tend to use it less for virtuoso melodic work, and more for the chordal or contrapuntal accompaniment, the melodies being played on other instruments, such as the flute or fiddle. A few individuals though, have pioneered the bouzouki's application for melodic work, including such players as Pat Kilbride, Brian McNeill, Jamie McMenemy, Gerald Trimble, Roger Landes, Ross McNerney and others.

== Development ==
The original Greek bouzouki is a three course / six-string instrument (trichordo) tuned D_{3}−A_{3}−D_{4} (with an octave pair on the lower course). In the 1950s, a four course / eight-string (tetrachordo) version was developed in Greece, tuned C_{3}−F_{3}−A_{3}−D_{4} (with octave pairs on the C and F courses) and popularized by Manolis Hiotis. The modern tetrachordo bouzouki was noticed by Irish musicians, who adopted and adapted it for accompaniment in Irish folk music, from whence it has diffused into other folk genres.

=== Transport from Greece to Ireland ===
Johnny Moynihan is credited with bringing the first tetrachordo Greek bouzouki to Ireland and retuning it to G_{2}−D_{3}−A_{3}−D_{4} (intervals he had first used on the mandolin). However, according to Leagues O'Toole, Moynihan bought his first bouzouki from his friend Tony Ffrench, who had brought it back to Ireland from Greece, but decided he couldn't play it, or didn't want to.

In the mid-1960s, Moynihan established a presence for the instrument in Irish music with the popular folk trio Sweeney's Men. During the recording of their 1968 eponymous album, Sweeney's Men, Andy Irvine also played Moynihan's bouzouki on the track "Johnston".

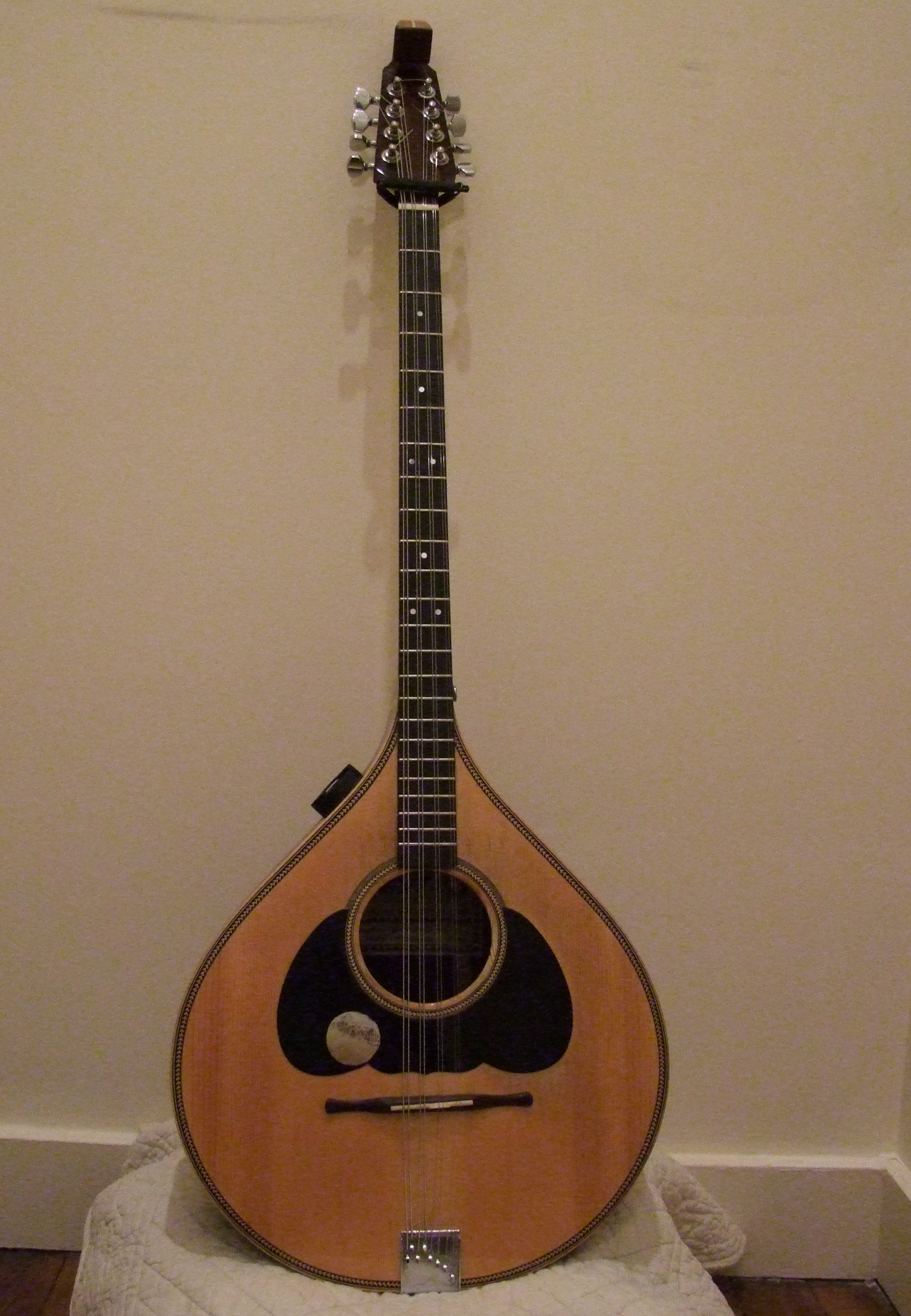
Irish bouzouki made by English luthier Peter Abnett in 1993

Shortly after he returned from Eastern Europe in late 1969, Irvine met Dónal Lunny – who had been playing guitar up to that point – and gave him a Greek bouzouki he had brought back from his travels. Being left-handed, Lunny reversed the strings and, crucially, replaced the octave strings on the two lowest courses with unison strings, thus fundamentally changing the character of the instrument.

Approximately a year later, Lunny accompanied Irvine to Peter Abnett's workshop and commissioned a partially staved-back instrument with similar specifications, marking the first Irish bouzouki to be specially made. This modified bouzouki was first integrated into Irish folk music when Irvine and Lunny popularized it with the advent of Planxty in 1972.

Irvine, however, credits Moynihan with having "brought the bouzouki to Ireland" in his lyric to "O'Donoghue's", his memoir of his experience of the early folk revival days in Dublin in the early '60s.

=== Irish-made bouzoukis ===
Almost immediately after the Greek bouzouki's initial introduction, new designs built specifically for Irish traditional music were developed. English builder Peter Abnett, – who was the first instrument-maker to build a uniquely "Irish" bouzouki, for Dónal Lunny in 1972 – developed a hybrid design with a 3-piece, partially staved back, and straight sides. Eventually other builders chose to use a flat back with straight sides which is the current prevailing design amongst most current builders.

The scale length of the Irish bouzouki most often ranges from 24 to 25 inches (60 to 65 cm). Some instruments have scales as long as 26 or even 27 inches (66 to 68 cm).

=== Diffusion into other folk music ===
The Irish bouzouki has also become integrated into some other western European musical traditions over the past forty years. It is now popularly used in the music of England, Scotland, Canada, the United States, Asturias, Galicia, Brittany, and even the Scandinavian countries.

Instrumental arrangements by musicians such as Ale Möller from Sweden, Jamie McMenemy of the Breton group Kornog, Elias Garcia of the Asturian groups Tuenda and Llan de Cubel, and Ruben Bada of the Asturian group DRD, typify the complex admixture of melody and chordal accompaniment to be found amongst skilled continental players. It has also become fashionable for some of these musicians to mix instrumental pieces from the Balkans into their material, creating the novelty of western European instruments playing music typically played by Bulgarian / Macedonian tamburas or Greek bouzoukis in their native setting.

== Tuning ==
By far the most common tuning for the Irish bouzouki is G_{2}−D_{3}−A_{3}−D_{4}.

The G_{2}−D_{3}−A_{3}−D_{4} tuning was pioneered by Johnny Moynihan, presumably in an attempt to replicate the open, droning sound of Appalachian "clawhammer" banjo, first on the mandolin and then transferred to a Greek bouzouki. It was later picked up by Andy Irvine and Dónal Lunny, and quickly became the next thing to a standard tuning for the instrument.

Other tunings used, although by a minority of players, are "octave mandolin" tuning G_{2}−D_{3}−A_{3}−E_{4}, and "Open D" tuning A_{2}−D_{3}−A_{3}−D_{4}. "Open G" G_{2}−D_{3}−G_{3}−D_{4}, is used by some players and has proven useful for "bottleneck" slide playing.

The G_{2}−D_{3}−A_{3}−D_{4} tuning is closer to the D_{3}−A_{3}−D_{4} tuning of the Greek trichordo bouzouki than is the guitar-like tuning C_{3}−F_{3}−A_{3}−D_{4} used on the modern Greek tetrachordo, and is particularly well suited to a modal harmonic approach to accompaniment used in Irish traditional music. Alec Finn, playing a Greek trichordo bouzouki, used the traditional D_{3}−A_{3}−D_{4} tuning with the octave pair on the lower D_{3} course changed to unison.

== Name and categorization ==
For many builders and players, there is significant overlap in the terms "bouzouki," "cittern," and "octave mandolin", even if they are not more or less synonymous.

The octave mandolin is usually regarded as having a shorter scale length than the Irish bouzouki, in the vicinity of 20 to 23 inches (50 to 59 cm). Irish bouzoukis most often range from 24 to 25 inches (60 to 65 cm), with some long-scale instruments extended to 26 or even 27 inches (66 to 68 cm).

Mandolin luthiers producing an octave mandolin are more likely to use mandolin tuning machines and reproduce the details and styling of their American-style carved top and back mandolins. Some luthiers choose to refer to their clearly bouzouki-style instruments as "octave mandolins", or even as "mandocellos," despite optimizing the design for the G_{2}−D_{3}−A_{3}−D_{4} tuning.

Amongst many luthiers and musicians the Irish bouzouki is considered to be part of the mandolin family, but for others this new family of instruments is a separate development. In the study of musical instruments the mandolin-like and lute-like instruments are part of a single, large family of plucked stringed instruments that includes all types of bouzouki. (Note: The lute / mandolin and bouzouki families were already crossed, by the introduction of Neapolitan mandolin building techniques and hardware, to bouzoukis built in Piraeus, Greece in the 1910s.) Since the genesis of the Irish bouzouki in the late 1960s, so many luthiers have incorporated so many aspects of mandolin construction – particularly when building archtop Irish bouzoukis – that for many, quibbling over categorization is a moot point.

Luthier Stefan Sobell adopted the old, disused term "cittern" to name his modern, mandolin-based instruments. He originally used the term for short scale instruments irrespective of the number of their strings, but now uses "cittern" for all five-course instruments irrespective of scale length, and "octave mandolin" to all four-course instruments, leaving out bouzouki entirely.

The name "cittern" is often, but not universally, used for 5-course instruments (Note: In this context, a 5-course instrument has 10 strings, grouped into 5 pairs.) – especially those having a scale length between 20 and 22 inches (50 cm and 55 cm). 5-course instruments with a long scale length are sometimes be called "10 string bouzoukis." The fifth course is usually either a lowest bass course tuned to C_{2} or D_{2} (long scale), or a highest treble course tuned to G_{4} or A_{4} (short scale).

== Notable players ==
- James Fagan
- Alec Finn
- Daoirí Farrell
- Andy Irvine
- Dónal Lunny
- Manus Lunny
- Johnny Moynihan
- Beth Patterson
- Paul Brady

== Bibliography ==
- Landes, Roger (2014). Irish Bouzouki Method. United States: Hal Leonard Publications. ISBN 9781423479635. — An instructional guide, with accompanying CD or mp3 downloads.
- Richards, Tobe A. (2005). The Irish Bouzouki Chord Bible: GDAD Irish tuning 2,447 chords. United Kingdom: Cabot Books. ISBN 0-9553944-0-6. — A comprehensive chord dictionary.
- McLeod, Zan (2001). Learn to Play the Irish Bouzouki (DVD). United States: Music Sales Limited. ASIN B00024ONEI. — A DVD instructional guide.
- O'Callanain, Niall (1997). The Irish Bouzouki. United States: Mel Bay Publications. ISBN 0-7866-1595-8. — An instructional guide.
- Ó Callanain, Niall; Walsh, Tommy (1989). The Irish Bouzouki. Ireland: Waltons. ISBN 07-8661-595-8. — An instructional guide, with audio cassette tape.
- McDonald, Graham (2016). The Mandolin: A history. Australia: MusicBooks Press. ISBN 978-0-9804762-7-9. — A history of mandolin-family instruments.
