= Declan Masterson =

- Born: Cabra, Dublin, Ireland
- Genre: Irish traditional music
- Occupations: Musician, composer
- Instruments: Uilleann pipes; low whistle; bouzouki; guitar; bodhrán; concertina; keyboards
- Years active: 1980s–present

Declan Masterson is an Irish uilleann piper, traditional musician, composer and arranger. In addition to pursuing a solo career and playing with Moving Hearts and Patrick Street, Masterson was one of the Riverdance musicians.

He has performed and recorded with many artists, including: Van Morrison, Dónal Lunny, Andy Irvine, Bill Whelan, Clannad, Jim McCann, Eleanor McEvoy, Townes Van Zandt, Michael Londra, Zoë Conway, Ronnie Drew (with Bono), John Denver and Christy Moore, among others.

== Early years ==
Born in Cabra, Dublin, Masterson grew up in a musical family on the edge of The Liberties, and learned to play the pipes and other instruments at an early age. He was encouraged by his parents Frances and Jim, who both played traditional music, and by his uncle Jimmy O'Reilly, a squeezebox player from Multyfarnham, County Westmeath. He took a keen interest in the uilleann pipes and was mentored by pipe maker Matt Kiernan, who lived nearby and made his first set. Masterson first played with the Pipers Club Céilí Band, and his first group was Tipsy Sailor, which included Gerry O'Connor (banjo) and Fiách Ó Broin (flute). Masterson gained a Leaving Certificate from O'Connell School, Dublin, in 1974.

== Music career ==
=== Moving Hearts ===
The group Moving Hearts was formed in 1981 when two members of Planxty, Dónal Lunny (bouzouki) and Christy Moore (vocals, guitar and bodhrán), decided to explore the possibilities of linking contemporary music to Irish traditional music. They initially intended to form a trio with guitarist Declan Sinnott, but then expanded the group to include Irish musicians Keith Donald (alto sax), Eoghan O'Neill (bass), Brian Calnan (drums), and Davy Spillane (uilleann pipes).

After several changes of personnel and the recording of three albums, Moving Hearts (1981), The Dark End Of The Street (1982) and Live Hearts (1983), Moving Hearts performed as an instrumental group, recording the album The Storm (1985) with a new line-up consisting of: Spillane and Masterson (uilleann pipes), Lunny (bouzouki, synthesiser & bodhrán), Donald (sax), Noel Eccles (percussion), Matt Kelleghan (drums), O'Neill (bass) and Greg Boland (guitar). The group ceased touring in 1984, appearing only at occasional festivals like the Preseli Folk Festival—now the Fishguard Folk Festival—in 1986. They performed for a sold out, farewell concert at Dublin's Point Theatre in 1990, with Flo McSweeney on vocals.

=== Mosaic ===
In the winter of 1984, Andy Irvine gathered a collection of musicians from throughout Europe and formed Mosaic, with a final line-up including Irvine himself, Lunny, Masterson, Danish Lissa Ladefoged (bass and vocals), Dutch Hans Theessink (guitar and vocals), and Hungarian singer Márta Sebestyén from Muzsikás.

They performed in Budapest on 12 July 1985, followed by a further two gigs in Hungary and an appearance at the Dranouter festival in Belgium in early August, prior to their English tour. Their seventh gig was billed at the Southport Arts Center, which Chris Hardwick of Folk Roots reviewed with the words: "Every once in a while the folk scene throws up a new permutation in which exceptionally gifted individuals come together to produce something so innovative and exhilarating that it goes way beyond the sum of the parts". However, the band lasted only that one summer.

=== Patrick Street ===
Masterson, along with Bill Whelan, joined Patrick Street in time to record the album Irish Times (1990).

=== Riverdance ===
In 1994, Masterson teamed up with Whelan again and joined Riverdance. He remained with the show on and off for its entire duration, playing uilleann pipes, low whistle, tin whistle, kaval and bouzouki, also taking on the duties of musical director, until the Farewell show in May 2012. He returned for the 25th Anniversary series of concerts, beginning at the 3Arena (Dublin) in February 2020, playing guitar, bouzouki, kaval and pipes. The shows planned for the 2020 US and UK tours were cancelled, with the US dates rescheduled to take place from January to July 2021.

=== Solo and other projects ===
He recorded six solo albums: End of the Harvest (1990), Tropical Trad (1993), Fairwater Fionnuisce (1996), Drifting Through The Hazel Woods (1996), Heartland (2005), and The Piper's Stone (2025).

He wrote and arranged music scores for film, TV and theatre, and his piping is featured on the soundtrack of the films The Irish RM (1983–1985), Eat the Peach (1986), The Secret of Roan Inish (1994) and Some Mother's Son (1996). He also participated in many recordings, with a wide range of musicians (see Selected discography).

== Selected discography ==
Solo albums

- End of the Harvest (1990)
- Tropical Trad (1993)
- Fairwater Fionnuisce (1996)
- Drifting Through The Hazel Woods (1996)
- Heartland (2005)
- The Piper's Stone (2025)

With Johnny McEvoy

- Long Before Your Time (1976)

With Moving Hearts

- The Storm (1985)
- Donal Lunny's Definitive Moving Hearts (2003)

With Van Morrison

- A Sense of Wonder (1985)

With Danny Doyle

- Twenty Years A-Growing (1987)

With Jim McCann

- From Tara To Here (1987)
- The Collection (2001)

With Patrick Street

- Irish Times (1990)

With Eleanor McEvoy

- Eleanor McEvoy (1993)

With Geraldine & Danny Doyle

- Emigrant Eyes (1993)

With Shotts & Dykehead Caledonia Pipeband

- By the Waters Edge (1994)

With Maurice Dickson

- Where Eagles Fly (1994)

With Townes Van Zandt

- No Deeper Blue (1994)

With Bill Whelan

- Riverdance: Music from the Show (1995)
- Some Mother's Son (1996)
- Roots of Riverdance (1997)
- Seville Suite Live (2004) CD/DVD with Galecian Sinfonia Orchestra La Corûna
- Riverdance 25th Anniversary: Music from the Show (2020)

With Ronnie Drew

- Dirty Rotten Shame (1995)

With Anúna

- Invocation (1996)

With Clannad

- Lore (1996)

With Andy Irvine

- Rain on the Roof (1996)
- Way Out Yonder (2000)

With Metal Gear Solid

- Metal Gear Solid Original Game Soundtrack (1998)

With Máirín Fahy

- Máirín (1998)

With Andrew White

- Guitarra Celtica (1999)

With Michael Londra

- Christopher (2001)
- Celt (2006)

With Zoë Conway

- Zoë Conway (2002)

With the Celtic Orchestra

- Celtic Reflections (2002)

With Brian Kennedy

- On Song (2003)

With Bryan Adams

- Room Service (2004)

With Róisin Dempsey

- Spirit Of An Irish Christmas (2005)

With Elliot Randall. "Still Reelin'"(2006)

With Tommy Fleming

- A Life Like Mine (2006)
- The Best Is Yet to Come (2009)
- Song for a Winter's Night (2009)

With Colin Farrell

- Make a Note (2015)

With Patrick Mangan

- The Frost is All Over (2020)

With other artists / Compilations

- Irish Memories (1988)
- Heart of the Gaels (1992)
- Lament (1993)
- Celtic Heartbeat Collection (1995)
- Realta '96 (1996)
- Celtic Twilight, Vol.4: Celtic Planet (1997)
- Dance of the Celts (1997)
- Celtic Treasure, Vol.2 (1998)
- The Celtic Experience (2000)
- Celtic Solstice (2002)
- Celtica [Sony #1] (2002)
- Dark Age of Camelot: A Musical Journey (2002)
- Island Blues (2002)
- Tranquility Gold (2002)
- Ireland: Essential Guide (2009)

Film scores

- The Irish RM (1983–1985)
- Eat the Peach (1986)
- The Secret of Roan Inish (1994)
- Some Mother's Son (1996)

== See also ==
- List of bagpipers
