= Live in Dublin (Moving Hearts album) =

Live album by Moving Hearts
- Released: 28 January 2008
- Recorded: February 2007
- Venue: Vicar Street, Dublin
- Genre: Folk rock
- Label: Rubyworks
- Producer: Noel Eccles & Keith Donald

Moving Hearts chronology
| The Storm (1985) | Live in Dublin (2008) |

Live in Dublin is the second live album by Irish folk rock band Moving Hearts, recorded in 2007 at the Vicar Street venue in Dublin by Tim Martin. Noel Eccles and Keith Donald were executive producers, and the album was mixed by Andrew Boland and mastered by Martin Giles at Alchemy, in London.

== Recording ==
For this series of performances at Vicar Street, the band were augmented by Kevin Glackin (fiddle) and Graham Henderson (keyboards) but minus Flo McSweeney (vocals), thereby rekindling the instrumental format adopted for the recording of The Storm (1985). Previous band members also missing from this line-up included Declan Sinnott (guitar) and Declan Masterson (uilleann pipes).

== Critical reception ==
Live in Dublin received positive reviews from folk music critics.

In his review of the live concert itself in Hot Press (22 February 2007), Colm O'Hare stated:

- "The Hearts' return to the stage was always going to be special and there certainly was magic in the air as Donal Lunny, Davy Spillane, Eoghan O'Neill, Keith Donald, Matt Kellaghan, Noel Eccles, Anto Drennan and Graham Henderson took to the stage for the first of a four night stand."
- "It was [The Storm] that made up the bulk of the set and there were audible gasps and howls of recognition as the familiar strains of tunes such as "The Lark", "May Morning Dew", "The Titanic", "Tribute To Peadar O’Donnell" wafted from the stage. There was still room for tunes such as "McBrides" from their eponymous debut and a couple of newer pieces (one featuring special guest Kevin Glacken on fiddle)."
- "But what was truly remarkable night was their ability to click right back into gear, without missing a cue. The warmth of the reception they received spoke volumes about their place at the heart of Irish music."

In his review of the album for The Guardian (18 January 2008), Robin Denselow stated:

- "The good news is that the great Irish band Moving Hearts have decided to reform. (…) Moving Hearts have become a purely instrumental band, and this new set is very much a reworking of their 1985 instrumental album, The Storm, but now performed with even more confidence and attack. The aim, it seems, is to mix Irish traditional influences with a dash of jazz and rock, and the result is a pomp-folk hybrid style that would be ideal for an Irish-flavoured Hollywood epic."

Denselow added:

- "The less good news is that it's only the final lineup who have got together again, rather than the intriguing group of musicians who recorded their classic 1981 debut album. The original band mixed experimental instrumental work with angry political songs from Christy Moore, who is currently on excellent form, working with the Hearts' former guitarist Declan Sinnott."

In his review of the album for The List (28 February 2008), Kenny Mathieson stated:

- "Reunions can often be disappointing affairs, but the occasional return to action of this mighty Irish band have been notable exceptions. This album was recorded on home ground last year, and if their pioneering fusion of folk with jazz and rock influences is now a given, their compelling music has lost none of its majestic energy, as their gigs in Glasgow and Inverness in January confirmed."
- "Live in Dublin captures them in glorious flow in the instrumental-only mode of their final classic recording, The Storm, which was actually recorded after they disbanded in 1984. All of that seminal album is featured here, including the tune sets "The Lark", "The Titanic" and "The Storm", and Donal Lunny’s hauntingly beautiful slow air "Tribute to Peardar O’Donnell"."

== Track listing ==
1. The Lark:
  - "The Lark in the Morning" (Trad. Arr. Spillane, Lunny, O'Neill)
  - "Earl the Breakfast Boiler" (Arr. Lunny, O'Neill)
  - "O'Brion's Flightcase" (Arr. Lunny, O'Neill)
  - "In the Mountains of Holland" (Arr. Lunny, O'Neill)
  - "Oh Hag You've Killed Me" (Arr. Lunny, O'Neill)
  - "Peter O'Byrne's Fancy"
  - "Langstrom's Pony"
2. The Titanic:
  - "An Irishman in Brittany" (O'Neill)
  - "A Breton in Paris" (Lunny)
3. "Finore" (Spillane)
4. "Tribute To Peadar O'Donnell" (Lunny)
5. "Category" (Lunny, Sinnott)
6. "Lake of Shadows" (Lunny, Sinnott, O'Neill)
7. "Downtown" (Spillane)
8. The Storm:
  - "The Storm in the Teeshirt" (Spillane)
  - "The Staff in the Baggot" (Lunny)
9. "May Morning Dew" (Trad. Arr. Spillane, Lunny, O'Neill)
10. "Intro"/"McBrides" (Moving Hearts)/(Lunny, Sinnott, O'Neill)

== Personnel ==
- Davy Spillane – uilleann pipes, low whistle
- Keith Donald – soprano and alto saxophones & bass clarinet
- Kevin Glackin – fiddle
- Dónal Lunny – bouzouki, baritone guitar
- Anthony Drennan – electric guitar
- Graham Henderson – keyboards
- Eoghan O'Neill – bass
- Matt Kelleghan – drums
- Noel Eccles – percussion
