= Out of the Air =

Live album by Davy Spillane
- Released: 1988
- Recorded: Dublin & London
- Genre: Celtic Rock
- Length: 42:19
- Label: Tara Music
- Producer: PJ Curtis, Dale Griffin & Bill Whelan

Davy Spillane chronology
Atlantic Bridge (1987)	Out of the Air (1988)	Shadow Hunter (1990)

Out of the Air is an album by the Irish uilleann pipes player Davy Spillane, that was originally released on Tara Music in 1988. AllMusic awards this album with 4 stars.

Following the release of his Atlantic Bridge album, Uilleann Piper Davy put together a touring band including, Anto Drennan on Guitar, James Delaney on keyboards, Tony Molloy on bass, Paul Moran on drums. While on a UK tour the band recorded a session for BBC Radio One. Even though the session was recorded in the BBC studios with no audience it has since its release been regarded as a live recording. Additional studio sessions which included Rory Gallagher were added before the album's release.

== Track listing ==
1. "Atlantic Bridge" (Davy Spillane) – 5:25
2. "River of Gems" (Spillane) – 6:40
3. "Daire's Dream" (Spillane) – 4:07
4. "The Storm" (Dónal Lunny, Spillane) – 5:55
5. "Mystic Seacliffs" (Bill Whelan, Spillane) – 3:50
6. "The Road to Ballyalla" (Spillane) – 8:38
7. "Litton Lane" (Delaney, Drennan, Molloy, Moran, Spillane) – 5:16
8. "One for Phil" (Rory Gallagher, Spillane) – 2:28

== Personnel ==
- Davy Spillane - uilleann pipes, low whistle
- Anthony Drennan - guitar
- Rory Gallagher - guitar
- James Delaney - keyboards
- Tony Molloy - bass
- Paul Moran - drums
