= List of number-one singles of 1968 (Ireland) =

This is a list of singles which topped the Irish Singles Chart in 1968.

Prior to 1992, the Irish singles chart was compiled from trade shipments from the labels to record stores, rather than on consumer sales. The chart release day changed from Thursday to Saturday at the beginning of February.

Issue date	Song	Artist	Ref.
4 January	"Treat Me Daughter Kindly"	Pat Lynch	
11 January	"Daydream Believer"	The Monkees	
18 January	"Daydream Believer"	The Monkees	
25 January	"Am I That Easy to Forget"	Engelbert Humperdinck	
3 February	"Am I That Easy to Forget"	Engelbert Humperdinck	
10 February	"Am I That Easy to Forget"	Engelbert Humperdinck	
17 February	"Mighty Quinn"	Manfred Mann	
24 February	"Mary From Dungloe"	Emmet Spiceland	
3 March	"Mighty Quinn"	Manfred Mann	
10 March	"Mighty Quinn"	Manfred Mann	
17 March	"Nora"	Johnny McEvoy	
24 March	"The Legend of Xanadu"	Dave Dee, Dozy, Beaky, Mick & Tich	
31 March	"Delilah"	Tom Jones	
6 April	"Delilah"	Tom Jones	
13 April	"Delilah"	Tom Jones	
20 April	"Chance Of A Lifetime"	Pat McGeegan	
27 April	"Congratulations"	Cliff Richard	
4 May	"Congratulations"	Cliff Richard	
11 May	"Simon Says"	Dickie Rock	
18 May	"A Man Without Love"	Engelbert Humperdinck	
25 May	"A Man Without Love"	Engelbert Humperdinck	
1 June	"Young Girl"	Gary Puckett & The Union Gap	
8 June	"Young Girl"	Gary Puckett & The Union Gap	
15 June	"Honey"	Bobby Goldsboro	
22 June	"Honey"	Bobby Goldsboro	
29 June	"Honey"	Bobby Goldsboro	
6 July	"Honey"	Bobby Goldsboro	
13 July	"Blue Eyes"	Don Partridge	
20 July	"Blue Eyes"	Don Partridge	
27 July	"Blue Eyes"	Don Partridge	
3 August	"I Pretend"	Des O'Connor	
10 August	"I Pretend"	Des O'Connor	
17 August	"Help Yourself"	Tom Jones	
24 August	"Help Yourself"	Tom Jones	
31 August	"Help Yourself"	Tom Jones	
7 September	"Little Arrows"	Brendan O'Brien and The Dixies	
14 September	"Hey Jude"	The Beatles	
21 September	"I've Gotta Get a Message to You"	The Bee Gees	
28 September	"Hey Jude"	The Beatles	
5 October	"Hey Jude"	The Beatles	
12 October	"Those Were the Days"	Mary Hopkin	
19 October	"Those Were the Days"	Mary Hopkin	
26 October	"Those Were the Days"	Mary Hopkin	
2 November	"Those Were the Days"	Mary Hopkin	
9 November	"My Little Lady"	The Tremeloes	
16 November	"My Little Lady"	The Tremeloes	
23 November	"The Good, the Bad and the Ugly"	Hugo Montenegro	
30 November	"The Good, the Bad and the Ugly"	Hugo Montenegro	
7 December	"The Good, the Bad and the Ugly"	Hugo Montenegro	
14 December	"The Good, the Bad and the Ugly"	Hugo Montenegro	
21 December	"Lily the Pink"	The Scaffold	
28 December	"Lily the Pink"	The Scaffold	

== See also ==
- 1968 in music
- Irish Singles Chart
- List of artists who reached number one in Ireland
