= No Frontiers (song) =

Single by Mary Black

from the album No Frontiers
- B-side: "I Just Want to Dance with You/Goin' Back"
- Released: 1989
- Recorded: April–June 1989
- Studio: Windmill Lane Studios
- Genre: Celtic folk
- Length: 4:01
- Label: Dara
- Songwriter: Jimmy MacCarthy
- Producer: Declan Sinnott

Mary Black singles chronology
"Past the Point of Rescue" (1988)	"No Frontiers" (1989)	"Columbus" (1989)

"No Frontiers" is a 1989 Celtic folk song performed by Irish singer Mary Black.

== Song history ==
The song was written by Jimmy MacCarthy.

A bilingual English–Irish version was released during the 2020 COVID-19 pandemic, with vocals by Nell Ní Chróinín.

It was released by Evelyn Kallansee and Declan Sinnott in 2025, as "Evelyn and Dec."

== Personnel ==
- Mary Black - vocals
- Declan Sinnott - guitars, harmony vocals, producer
- Pat Crowley - accordion, keyboards, harmony vocals
- Garvan Gallagher - double bass, harmony vocals
- Noel Bridgeman - percussion, harmony vocals
- Carl Geraghty - saxophone
- Dónal Lunny - synthesizer

Technical

- DanDan FitzGerald - recording and mixing engineer

== Reception ==
In The Echo, Colette Sheridan said that "No Frontiers" was "iconic for so many women in Ireland. It has a theme of hope and inner strength, an apt message for the current climate."
