= Mary from Dungloe =

Mary from Dungloe may refer to:

- Mary from Dungloe (festival), an Irish music festival in Dungloe, County Donegal
- "Mary from Dungloe" (song), an Irish song by Donegal stonemason Pádraig Mac Cumhaill in 1936
