= Atlantic Bridge (album) =

Studio album by Davy Spillane
- Released: 1987 (re-released in 1988)
- Recorded: Lansdowne and Windmill Lane Studios, Dublin
- Genre: Celtic; Celtic rock; Celtic fusion; folk rock; worldbeat
- Length: 43:46
- Label: Tara Music label
- Producer: P.J. Curtis

Davy Spillane chronology
Atlantic Bridge (1987)	Out of the Air (1988)

Professional ratings
Review scores
Source	Rating
AllMusic	4.5/5 stars

Atlantic Bridge was the Irish uilleann pipes player Davy Spillane's first solo album after the break-up of Moving Hearts. Together with producer P.J. Curtis he assembled a stellar cast of musicians from both sides of the Atlantic including, Albert Lee, Béla Fleck, Jerry Douglas, Christy Moore and many more to produce a fine blend of traditional and contemporary music. Curtis observed the album's fusion of Irish traditional, contemporary, bluegrass and country rock, merging "happily to find new dimensions in music which resulted form those meetings."

The album was originally released on Tara Music in 1987. AllMusic awards the album with 4.5 stars.

There is a short acoustic hidden track at index point 11.

== Track listing ==
1. "Davy's Reels" (Davy Spillane) – 3:36
2. "Atlantic Bridge" (Spillane) – 5:22
3. "Daire's Dream" (Spillane) – 3:34
4. "Tribute to Johnny Doran" (Trad.) – 3:06
5. "O'Neills's Statement" (O'Neill) – 3:50
6. "By the River of Gems" (Spillane) – 7:41
7. "Sliverish" (Béla Fleck) – 2:58
8. "The Pigeon on the Gate" (O'Neill, Spillane) – 2:43
9. "In My Life" (John Lennon, Paul McCartney) – 2:45
10. "Lansdowne Blues" (Boland, Donnelly, Lee, O'Neill, Spillane) – 5:49
11. Untitled (unknown) – 0:12

== Personnel ==
- Davy Spillane – Uilleann pipes, Low Whistles, Hammer Dulcimer
- Albert Lee – Electric and Acoustic Guitar, Piano
- Béla Fleck – Banjo, Acoustic Guitar
- Jerry Douglas – Dobro
- Greg Boland – Guitars
- Eoghan O'Neill – Bass, Acoustic Guitars, Backing Vocals
- Christy Moore – Bodhrán
- Noel Eccles – Percussion
- John Donnelly – Drums
