= A Couple More Years =

Live album by Ronnie Drew and Eleanor Shanley
- Released: 2000
- Genre: Folk
- Label: Pinorrekk

Ronnie Drew chronology
The Humour Is on Me Now (1999)	A Couple More Years (2000)	An Evening with Ronnie Drew (2004)

A Couple More Years is an album by Ronnie Drew and Eleanor Shanley, released in 2000.

Eleanor Shanley was a member of De Danann, who had recorded Bob Dylan's "Boots of Spanish Leather" with The Dubliners on their 30 Years A-Greying album. Also featured are Mike Hanrahan and Bill Shanley as backup guitarists. A video of this show was also released.

"A Couple More Years" was written by Shel Silverstein and Dennis Locorriere and has been recorded by artists including Dr Hook (Locorriere's band) and Willie Nelson.

== Track listing ==
Source: iTunes

No.	Title	Length
1.	"A Couple More Years"	4:50
2.	"Johnny Lovely Johnny"	3:31
3.	"Ronnie Story 1"	2:11
4.	"Boots of Spanish Leather"	4:53
5.	"Ronnie Story 2"	2:58
6.	"What Will We Tell the Children"	3:52
7.	"Dreaming My Dreams"	3:34
8.	"Journey's End"	3:00
9.	"Hard Times"	4:10
10.	"Ronnie Story 3"	1:04
11.	"Viva La Quinta Brigada"	4:40
12.	"Ronnie Story 4"	0:23
13.	"The Young Man Who Used to Be"	3:21
14.	"Ronnie Story 5"	0:45
15.	"Brian Og and Mollie Ban"	3:06
16.	"Restless Farewell/Parting Glass"	6:20
17.	"Ronnie Story 6"	0:54
18.	"We Had It All"	4:14
