= Moving Hearts (album) =

Studio album by Moving Hearts
- Released: 1981
- Recorded: Ireland
- Studio: Keystone Studios, Dublin; Windmill Lane Studios, Dublin
- Genre: Irish folk, Rock music
- Length: 37.19
- Label: Warner Music Group
- Producer: Dónal Lunny

Moving Hearts chronology
Moving Hearts (1981)	Dark End of the Street (1982)

Moving Hearts is the debut studio album recorded by Irish Celtic rock band Moving Hearts. The album features folk singer Christy Moore on vocals.

== Track listing ==
1. "Hiroshima Nagasaki Russian Roulette" (Jim Page) – 4:22
2. "Irish Ways and Irish Laws" (John Gibbs) – 3:47
3. "McBrides" (Declan Sinnott, Dónal Lunny) – 3:05
4. "Before the Deluge" (Jackson Browne) – 5:40
5. "Landlord" (Jim Page) – 2:41
6. "Category" (Declan Sinnott, Dónal Lunny) – 2:55
7. "Faithful Departed" (Philip Chevron) – 4:44
8. "Lake of Shadows" (Declan Sinnott, Dónal Lunny, Eoghan O'Neill) – 4:45
9. "No Time for Love" (Jack Warshaw) – 7:20

== Personnel ==
Moving Hearts

- Christy Moore - vocals, guitar, bodhrán
- Dónal Lunny - vocals, bouzouki, synthesiser
- Declan Sinnott - lead guitar, acoustic, vocals
- Tony Davis - backing vocals
- Eoghan O'Neill - bass guitar, vocals
- Brian Calnan - drums, percussion
- Davy Spillane - Uilleann pipes, low whistle
- Keith Donald - tenor and soprano saxophone
- Nollaig Casey (credited as Nollaig Ni Cathasaigh) - violin
