= Dark End of the Street (Moving Hearts album) =

1982 album by Moving Hearts

- Cover of the studio album (vinyl LP)

Studio album by Moving Hearts
- Released: 1982
- Recorded: Ridge Farm Studio
- Genre: folk rock
- Length: 36:33
- Label: WEA
- Producer: Dónal Lunny

Moving Hearts chronology
Moving Hearts (1981)	Dark End of the Street (1982)	Live Hearts (1983)

Dark End of the Street is the second studio album recorded by Irish Celtic rock band Moving Hearts. The album features folk singer Christy Moore on most of the songs, except "Let Somebody Know", written and sung by Declan Sinnott.

Two versions of Dark End of the Street, with identical front covers, were released simultaneously as vinyl LPs in 1982: one was a studio album and the other was released in some countries as a compilation album, with a different track listing. The original studio album was re-released on CD in 1995.

== Studio album ==
The studio album was released as a vinyl LP in 1982.

=== Track listing ===
Side one
No.	Title	Writer(s)	Length
1.	"Remember The Brave Ones"	Barry Moore	4:34
2.	"Dark End Of The Street"	Chips Moman, Dan Penn	4:59
3.	"All I Remember"	Mick Hanly	4:00
4.	"Let Somebody Know"	Declan Sinnott	6:01

Side two
No.	Title	Writer(s)	Length
5.	"What Will You Do About Me"	Jesse Oris Farrow	5:53
6.	"Downtown"	Davy Spillane	2:30
7.	"Allende"	Don Lange	3:29
8.	"Half-Moon"	Eoghan O'Neill	5:07

== Compilation album ==
Dark End of the Street
- Cover of the compilation album (vinyl LP)

Compilation album by Moving Hearts
- Released: 1982
- Recorded: Keystone Studios, Dublin; Windmill Lane Studios, Dublin; Ridge Farm Studio, England
- Genre: Irish folk
- Length: 52:05
- Label: WEA
- Producer: Dónal Lunny

Moving Hearts chronology
Moving Hearts (1981)	Dark End of the Street (1982)	Live Hearts (1983)

In some countries (US and Canada), a vinyl LP was also released in 1982 with the same title and front cover, but a different track listing, as a compilation of tracks selected from the following studio albums:

- Moving Hearts (1981) – (tracks: 1, 2, 4, 6, 9)
- Dark End of the Street (1982) – (tracks: 3, 5, 7, 8, 10).

The catalogue number for this compilation album was: 'WEA 1802' in the US and 'WEA MH15' in Canada.

=== Track listing ===
Side one
No.	Title	Writer(s)	Length
1.	"Hiroshima Nagasaki Russian Roulette"		4:25
2.	"Before the Deluge"		5:40
3.	"Let Somebody Know"	Declan Sinnott	5:54
4.	"McBrides"		3:10
5.	"What Will You Do About Me"	Jesse Oris Farrow	5:07

Side two
No.	Title	Writer(s)	Length
6.	"No Time for Love"		7:20
7.	"Downtown"	Davy Spillane	2:25
8.	"Dark End of the Street"	Moman-Penn	4:53
9.	"Half-Moon"	Eoghan O'Neill	5:02
10.	"Remember the Brave Ones"	Barry Moore	4:27

== Re-release of the studio album on CD ==
Dark End of the Street
- Cover of the re-released studio album (CD)

Studio album by Moving Hearts
- Released: 1995
- Recorded: Ridge Farm Studio
- Genre: Irish folk
- Length: 36:33
- Label: WEA
- Producer: Dónal Lunny

Moving Hearts chronology
Moving Hearts (1981)	Dark End of the Street (1995)	Live Hearts (1983)

The studio album was re-released on CD in 1995, with the original track list.

=== Track listing ===
No.	Title	Writer(s)	Length
1.	"Remember The Brave Ones"	Barry Moore	4:34
2.	"Dark End Of The Street"	Moman-Penn	4:59
3.	"All I Remember"	Mick Hanly	4:00
4.	"Let Somebody Know"	Declan Sinnott	6:01
5.	"What Will You Do About Me"	Jesse Oris Farrow	5:53
6.	"Downtown"	Davy Spillane	2:30
7.	"Allende"	Don Lange	3:29
8.	"Half-Moon"	Eoghan O'Neill	5:07

== Personnel ==
The two versions of the 1982 album featured the following musicians:

- Christy Moore – vocals, guitar, bodhrán
- Dónal Lunny – vocals, bouzouki, synthesiser
- Declan Sinnott – lead guitar, acoustic, vocals
- Tony Davis – backing vocals
- Eoghan O'Neill – bass guitar, vocals
- Matt Kellaghan – drums
- Brian Calnan – drums, percussion
- Davy Spillane – Uilleann pipes, low whistle
- Keith Donald – Tenor and Soprano saxophone
- Nollaig Casey (credited as Nollaig Ni Cathasaigh) – violin
