= Emmet Spiceland =

Irish folk band

- Origin: Ireland and Sheffield
- Genres: folk; Irish traditional
- Years active: 1967–70; 1973; 2017
- Labels: Page One; Gael-Linn; Inset
- Spinoff of: The Emmet Folk Group; Spiceland Folk
- Past members: Brian Byrne; Michael Byrne; Dónal Lunny; Brian Bolger; Mick Moloney

Emmet Spiceland was an Irish folk band formed when brothers Brian Byrne and Michael Byrne of the Spiceland Folk Group joined forces with Dónal Lunny, Brian Bolger and Mick Moloney's Emmet Folk Group.

Emmet Spiceland hold a special place in Irish music history as the first of their kind, bringing what was, at the time, a modern sound, to the previously stiff and conservative national airwaves. They were known for beautiful harmonies, pin-up good looks, Mod style and previously unheard of contemporary arrangements of Irish classics.

== History ==
In the mid-1960s, both folk groups were enjoying their own successes. The Emmet Folk Group, including Mick Moloney, came in second in the 1966 Wexford Ballad Contest, losing out to The Johnstons. Meanwhile, The Spicelanders were a popular attraction in folk clubs in Dublin. The two had already been billed in concerts together, and when Moloney left for The Johnstons, the two groups merged in 1967.

The band enjoyed screaming Beatlemania-style scenes at public appearances after a number of chart successes, with the single "Mary from Dungloe" hitting number one. The single was taken from their album, The First which featured arrangements of eleven traditional songs and one by Shay Healy, with orchestral arrangements by Phil Coulter. (Christy Moore praised the band in a documentary of his life, accompanied by footage of a performance at the All Ireland final at Croke Park in Dublin.)

The band's management employed marketing and poster campaigns said to be ahead of their time, with band members in glamorous settings not common to the day. The success of their song "Mary from Dungloe" inspired the creation of the Mary From Dungloe International Festival which is still going strong today.

In July 2017, they reformed for one evening only, in celebration of the 50th anniversary of the Mary from Dungloe festival.

== Aftermath ==
Brian Byrne went on to further fame in London's West End with Jesus Christ Superstar and Joseph, amongst other successes. Michael's interests took him toward the visual arts, following up an unfulfilled desire to attend art school in his teens. Dónal Lunny moved on to now-legendary projects such as Planxty, The Bothy Band and Moving Hearts. He's produced, played and arranged for the likes of Kate Bush, Paul Brady, Elvis Costello, Rod Stewart, Indigo Girls, Clannad, The Waterboys, and Baaba Maal.

== Family ==
Michael and Brian Byrne are from a family of musical and performing talent; their father, Tommy Byrne won the Feis Ceoil three years in a row in the 1930s. He was a celebrated Irish famous boy soprano at the age of thirteen and trod the boards of such intimidating venues as the Dublin Theatre Royal and on Irish radio. In 1967, Michael and Brian Byrne had won the Wexford Ballad Contest, in which Emmet Spiceland had taken second place the year before. Relations Clannad have credited the brothers' success with inspiring their interest in performing.

In addition, among other children of the Byrnes and of Donal Lunny who became professional musicians, sons of two of the band members (Oisin Lunny and MC Hollis Michael Byrne) were founder members of the politically-radical 1990s Anglo-Irish hip-hop group Marxman.

Four sisters of the Byrnes also formed the 1980s singing quartet Jeep, which was popular on the UK variety scene. One of the Byrne sisters, Anne, is mother to singer Tulisa, formerly of N-Dubz and ex-X-Factor judge.
