= Dirty Rotten Shame =

Studio album by Ronnie Drew
- Released: 1995
- Studio: Windmill Lane Studios, Dublin
- Label: Columbia
- Producer: Keith Donald

Ronnie Drew chronology
Guaranteed (1978)	Dirty Rotten Shame (1995)	The Humour Is on Me Now (1999)

Dirty Rotten Shame is an album by Ronnie Drew, released in 1995.

Drew left The Dubliners in 1995, after recording this album due to its high chart success in the Irish Charts. It has more of a rock music feel than his previous solo albums and features Aslan on backing vocals.

It was produced by Keith Donald, formerly of Moving Hearts and contains songs by Elvis Costello, Christy Moore and U2's Bono.

== Track listing ==
1. "Gardiner Street Blues" (Donal McDonald) - 5:16
2. "Eurolations" (Donal McDonald) - 3:56
3. "Do You Want My Job" (Ry Cooder) - 5:43
4. "The Dunes" (Shane MacGowan)
5. "One Last Cold Kiss" (Felix Pappalardi, Gail Collins) - 3:18
6. "Dirty Rotten Shame" (Elvis Costello) - 3:44
7. "Drinkin' in the Day" (Bono, Simon Carmody) - 4:46
8. "Viva La Quinte Brigada" (Christy Moore) - 4:33
9. "Happy As a Baby" (Mick Hanly) - 3:52
10. "Far Off Fields" (Keith Donald) - 2:45
11. "True Ron Ron" (Keith Donald) - 2:44
12. "Brothers in Arms" (Mark Knopfler) - 4:40

== Personnel ==
- Ronnie Drew - guitar, vocals
- Anthony Drennan - acoustic and electric guitar, Spanish guitar
- Eoghan O'Neill - bass, 6-string bass, acoustic guitar
- Keith Donald - saxophone, bass clarinet, soprano recorder
- Máirtín O'Connor - button key accordion
- Declan Masterson - Uilleann bagpipes, bouzouki, low whistle
- Myles Drennan - drums, keyboards
- Noel Eccles - percussion
- Mick Nolan - trumpet, piccolo trumpet, flugelhorn
- Aslan, Jenny Newman, Karen Hamill - backing vocals
- Luke Slott - boy soprano
