= No Frontiers =

Studio album by Mary Black
- Released: 1989
- Recorded: April–June 1989
- Studio: Windmill Lane Studios, Dublin, Ireland
- Genre: Celtic
- Label: Dara Records
- Producer: Declan Sinnott

Mary Black chronology
By the Time it Gets Dark (1987)	No Frontiers (1989)	Babes in the Wood (1991)

Professional ratings
Review scores
Source	Rating
AllMusic	3/5 stars

No Frontiers is an album by Irish singer Mary Black. The album was one of Ireland's best selling albums of 1989 and introduced her to audiences elsewhere in Europe and in the United States and Japan. The album spent 56 weeks in the Irish Top 30.

== Track listing ==
1. "No Frontiers" (Jimmy MacCarthy) – 3:57
2. "Past the Point of Rescue" (Mick Hanly) – 6:45
3. "The Shadow" (Donagh Long) – 5:46
4. "Carolina Rua" (Thom Moore) – 5:04
5. "Shuffle of the Buckled" (MacCarthy) – 4:17
6. "Columbus" (Noel Brazil) – 4:10
7. "Another Day" (MacCarthy) – 4:34
8. "Fat Valley of Pain" (Brazil) – 6:20
9. "I Say a Little Prayer" (Burt Bacharach, Hal David) – 5:34
10. "Vanities" (Brazil) – 4:38
11. "The Fog in Monterey" (Moore) – 4:02

== Personnel ==
- Mary Black - vocals
- Declan Sinnott - guitars, harmony vocals, producer
- Pat Crowley - accordion, keyboards, harmony vocals
- Garvan Gallagher - double bass, harmony vocals
- Noel Bridgeman - percussion, harmony vocals
- Carl Geraghty - saxophone
- Dónal Lunny - synthesizer (tracks 1, 3, 6, 7)
- Caroline Lavelle - cello (tracks 3, 6)
- Mandy Murphy - backing vocals (tracks 2, 4, 5, 7, 8, 9, 11)
- Tony Davis - backing vocals (tracks 2, 9)

Technical

- DanDan FitzGerald - recording and mixing engineer
