= Anthony Drennan =

Irish guitarist

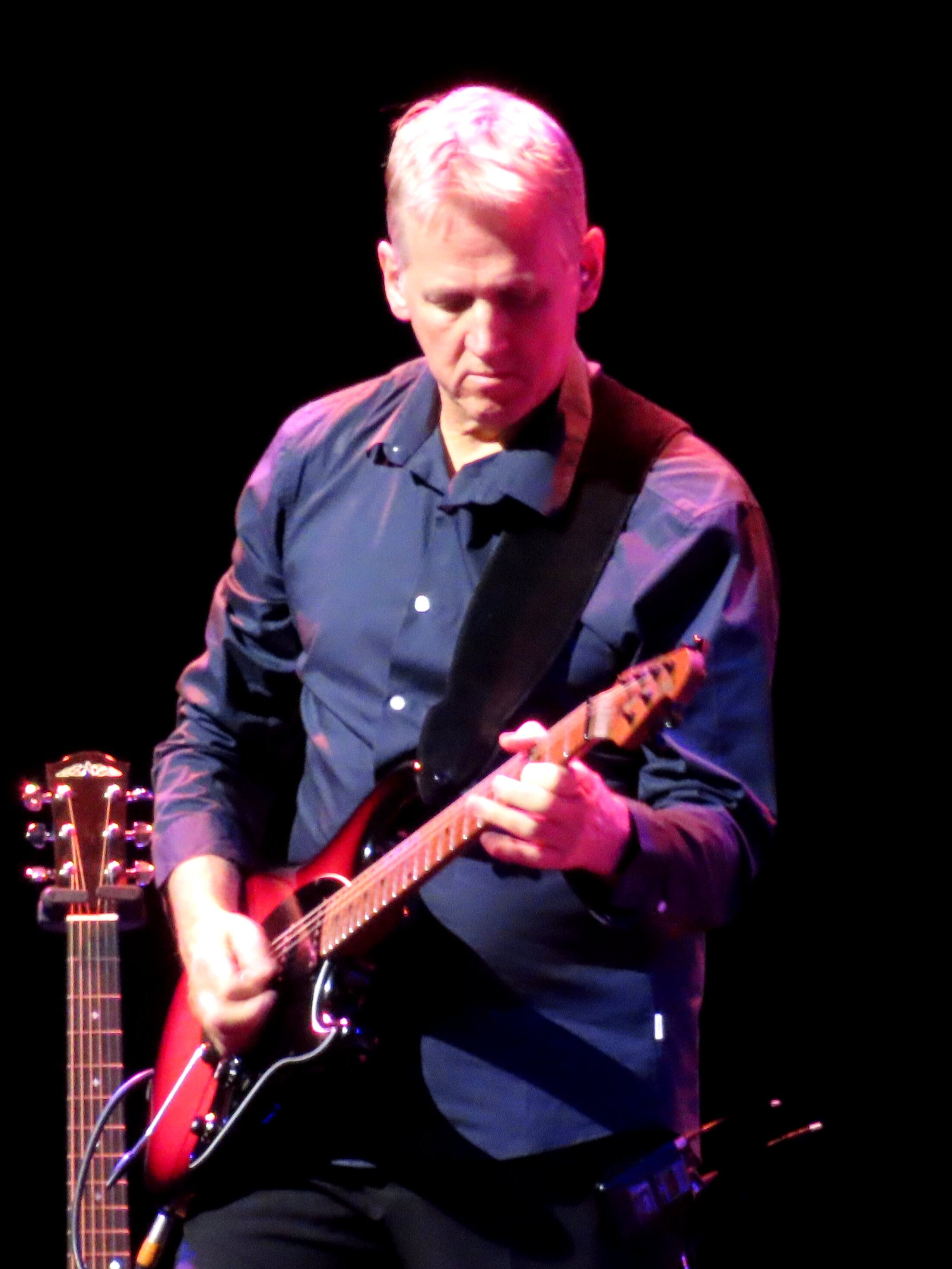
- Drennan performing with The Corrs in 2024

Background information
- Also known as: Anto
- Origin: Dublin, Ireland
- Genres: Progressive rock; folk rock; pop rock; soft rock; celtic rock
- Occupation: Musician
- Instruments: Guitar; bass
- Years active: 1985–present
- Member of: The Corrs; Mike and the Mechanics
- Formerly of: Genesis

Anthony "Anto" Drennan is an Irish guitarist and bassist noted for his involvement with the Corrs, Moya Brennan, Genesis and Mike + the Mechanics.

Drennan is from a musical Irish family; he and his family moved to Ireland while he was at a young age. He grew up in County Dublin and attended Kilmacud National School.

Drennan became a touring lead guitarist for the Corrs from late 1995 and onwards. He was chosen as the touring second lead guitarist/bassist for Genesis on their 1998 Calling All Stations tour (replacing long-time live band member Daryl Stuermer). In 2010, he was hired as the lead guitarist and secondary bassist of the revived Mike + the Mechanics. He has also played with Clannad, Paul Brady, Moving Hearts, Chris Rea, Davy Spillane, the Liffey Light Orchestra, and the Ronnie Drew Band.

== Discography ==
- 1985 : Clannad : Macalla
- 1986 : Zerra One : The Domino Effect
- 1988 : Davy Spillane Band : Out in the air
- 1989 : Stano : Only - Plays on 2 songs
- 1989 : Terence Trent D'Arby : Neither Fish Nor Flesh: A Soundtrack Of Love, Faith, Hope And Destruction
- 1989 : Clannad : Past Present - Plays on In a lifetime with Mel Collins & Bono from U2
- 1990 : Clannad : Anam
- 1990 : Republic Of Ireland Football Squad : Put'em Under Pressure - Maxi single
- 1990 : Davy Spillane : Shadow Hunter
- 1991 : Chris Rea : Auberge
- 1991 : Davy Spillane : Pipedreams
- 1992 : Andy Irvine & Davy Spillane : East Wind
- 1993 : Clannad : Banba
- 1994 : Máire Brennan : Misty eyed adventure
- 1994 : Paul Harrington & Charlie McGettigan : Rock 'N' Roll Kids - Anthony plays electric guitar & bass
- 1995 : Paul Brady : Spirits Colliding - Plays on 1 song
- 1995 : Various Artists : Celtic Christmas - Plays acoustic guitar on 1 song
- 1995 : Ronnie Drew : Dirty Rotten Shame - Plays electric, acoustic & Spanish guitars
- 1995 : Clannad : Lore
- 1997 : Ronan Hardiman : Solas - Plays Nylon Guitar on 1 song
- 1997 : Bill Whelan : The Roots Of Riverdance - Plays on 2 songs
- 1997 : The Corrs : Talk On Corners - Plays on 3 songs
- 1997 : The Corrs : Live
- 1997 : The Corrs : Closer - Plays on 2 songs
- 1997 : Clannad : Landmarks - Plays on 7 songs, also with Mel Collins
- 1998 : Máire Brennan : Perfect time
- 1998 : Various Artists : Med Et Z Præsenterer [Radiohitz] - Live & Unplugged - Plays on Congo by Genesis
- 1998 : Kieran Goss : Worse Than Pride - Plays on 3 songs
- 1999 : The Corrs : Unplugged
- 1999 : Máire Brennan : Whisper To The Wild Water
- 1999 : Daniel O'Donnell : Greatest Hits
- 2000 : The Corrs : In Blue
- 2000 : The Corrs : Live At Lansdowne Road
- 2001 : The Corrs : Live in London
- 2001 : Five : Kingsize - Plays on 1 song
- 2002 : The Corrs : VH1 Presents The Corrs Live In Dublin - With Ron Wood & Bono
- 2002 : Will Young : From Now On - Plays on 2 songs
- 2002 : Blazin' Squad : In The Beginning: Special Edition
- 2002 : Clannad : A Magical Gathering - The Clannad Anthology - Plays on 9 songs
- 2003 : Moya Brennan : Two Horizons
- 2003 : The Idols : The XMas Factor - Plays on 1 song
- 2004 : The Corrs : Borrowed Heaven - Additional guitar on 1 song
- 2004 : John Hughes : Wild Ocean - With The Corrs & The Chieftains
- 2004 : Gabrielle : Play to win - Plays on 5 songs, also Dylan Howe on drums
- 2005 : The Corrs : Home - Plays on 10 songs
- 2005 : Moya Brennan : An Irish Christmas
- 2006 : The Corrs : Dreams (The Ultimate Corrs Collection) - Featuring Bono, The Chieftains, Laurent Voulzy & Ron Wood
- 2006 : Various Artists : Rogue's Gallery (Pirate Ballads, Sea Songs, & Chanteys) - Plays on 2 songs
- 2007 : Eivør : Mannabarn - Plays on 6 songs
- 2007 : Genesis : 1983 - 1998 - Plays on 3 songs
- 2007 : Moving Hearts : Live in Dublin
- 2009 : Genesis : Live in Poland - 2 CD
- 2010 : Sharon Corr : Dream of you
- 2011 : Liffey Light Orchestra : Filaments
- 2011 : Gavin Friday : Catholic - Plays on 8 songs
- 2011 : Mike + The Mechanics: The Road
- 2014 : Mike + The Mechanics : The Singles 1985 - 2014
- 2014 : Sharon Corr : The Same Sun - Plays classical guitar on 1 song
- 2015 : The Corrs : White light - Plays on 1 song
- 2017 : Liffey Light Orchestra : Le French Album
- 2017 : Mike + The Mechanics : Let Me Fly
- 2017 : The Corrs: Jupiter Calling
- 2019 : Mike + The Mechanics: Out of the Blue
- 2020 : Liffey Light Orchestra: Lekeila
- 2025 : Mike + The Mechanics: Living the Years
- 2025 : Liffey Light Orchestra: Jigs and Other Stories

== Filmography ==
- 1999 : The Corrs: Les live de Solidays
- 2000 : Unplugged - Various Artists
- 2000 : The Corrs at Christmas
- 2000 : The Corrs: Live at Lansdowne Road
- 2002 : The Corrs Live in Dublin
- 2005 : The Corrs Live in Geneva
- 2008 : Moving Hearts Live in Dublin (Recorded 2007)
- 2009 : Genesis Live in Poland - 2 DVD
- 2011 : Living with the tiger - Documentary Music by John Califra & Anthony Drennan
