= The Humour Is on Me Now =

Studio album by Ronnie Drew
- Released: 1999
- Recorded: April 1999
- Studio: The Works, Dublin
- Label: Dolphin Records
- Producer: Mike Hanrahan

Ronnie Drew chronology
Dirty Rotten Shame (1995)	The Humour Is on Me Now (1999)	A Couple More Years (2000)

The Humour Is on Me Now is an album by Ronnie Drew, released in 1999.

This album was produced by Mike Hanrahan in 1999 and features a number of traditional musicians, including John Sheahan. Also featured are Ronnie Drew's recordings of two songs by Patrick Kavanagh – "on Raglan Road" and "If Ever You Go To Dublin Town".

Hot Press described it as "a welcome return to form for Mr. Drew and a fine album to boot. Well worth a listen."

== Track listing ==
1. "The Humour Is On Me Now"
2. "Always Remember"
3. "Since Maggie Went Away"
4. "Red Roses for Me"
5. "Limerick Rake"
6. "Clearing a Space"
7. "Raglan Road"
8. "If Ever You Go to Dublin Town"
9. "Courtin' In the Kitchen"
10. "Two Island Swans"
11. "The Dunes"
12. "The Black Velvet Band"
13. "The Dingle Puck Goat"
14. "We Had It All"
