= Aisling Friel =

Scottish model

- Born: c. 1983
- Occupation(s): Model, beauty pageant titleholder
- Known for: Representing Scotland at Miss World 2005
- Title: Miss Scotland 2005

Aisling Friel (born c. 1983) is a Scottish model and beauty pageant titleholder. She was Mary from Dungloe in 2003 and was crowned Miss Scotland 2005 and represented her country at the Miss World 2005 competition where she was unplaced. She married football player Stephen Pearson in 2010, but in 2012 the couple separated. She is now married to Glasgow restaurateur Ryan Barrie.
