= The Storm (Moving Hearts album) =

Studio album by Moving Hearts
- Released: 1985
- Recorded: Dublin
- Genre: Celtic rock
- Label: Tara Music label
- Producer: Dónal Lunny

Moving Hearts chronology
Live Hearts (1983)	The Storm (1985)	Live in Dublin (2007)

The Storm is the third studio album by Irish folk-rock group Moving Hearts, recorded as an entirely instrumental album. When the band re-formed in 2007, they concentrated on performing this material.

== Track listing ==
1. The Lark:
  - "The Lark in the Morning" (Trad. Arr. Spillane, Lunny, O'Neill)
  - "Earl the Breakfast Boiler" (Arr. Lunny, O'Neill)
  - "O'Brion's Flightcase" (Arr. Lunny, O'Neill)
  - "In the Mountains of Holland" (Arr. Lunny, O'Neill)
  - "Oh Hag You've Killed Me" (Arr. Lunny, O'Neill)
  - "Peter O'Byrne's Fancy"
  - "Langstrom's Pony"
2. The Titanic:
  - "An Irishman in Brittany" (O'Neill)
  - "A Breton in Paris" (Lunny)
3. The Storm:
  - "The Storm in the Teashirt" (Spillane)
  - "The Staff in the Baggot" (Lunny)
4. "Finore" (Spillane)
5. "Tribute To Peadar O'Donnell" (Lunny)
6. "May Morning Dew" (Trad. Arr. Spillane, Lunny, O'Neill)

== Personnel ==
- Dónal Lunny - bouzouki, synthesiser & bodhran
- Keith Donald - soprano and alto saxophones & bass clarinet
- Davy Spillane - uilleann pipes & low whistle
- Declan Masterson - uilleann pipes
- Greg Boland - guitar
- Eoghan O'Neill - bass
- Noel Eccles - percussion
- Matt Kelleghan - drums
