= Live Hearts =

- Live Hearts LP cover

Live album by Moving Hearts
- Released: 1983
- Recorded: 28 February 1983
- Venue: Dominion Theatre, London
- Genre: Folk rock
- Label: WEA
- Producer: Steve Turner

Moving Hearts chronology
Dark End of the Street (1982)	Live Hearts (1983)	The Storm (1985)

Alternative cover
- Live Hearts CD cover

Live Hearts is the first live album by the Irish folk rock band Moving Hearts, recorded on 28 February 1983 at the Dominion Theatre London by the Rolling Stones Mobile Unit. Steve Turner produced and engineered the album.

== Track listing ==
=== Side one ===
1. "McBrides" (Dónal Lunny, Declan Sinnott, Eoghan O'Neill)
2. "2–1 Freddie" (Mick Hanly, Lunny, Sinnott)
3. "Downtown" (Davy Spillane)
4. "All I Remember" (Hanly)
5. "Open Those Gates" (Hanly, Lunny, Sinnott)

=== Side two ===
1. "Strain of the Dance" (J. McCarthy)
2. "What Will You Do About Me" (Jesse Oris Farrow)
3. "Let Somebody Know" (Sinnott)
4. "Lake of Shadows" (Lunny, Sinnott, O'Neill)

== Personnel ==
- Dónal Lunny – bouzouki, synthesiser, vocals
- Mick Hanly – vocals, guitar,
- Eoghan O'Neill – bass, vocals
- Declan Sinnott – guitar, vocals
- Davy Spillane – uilleann pipes, low whistle
- Keith Donald – soprano & tenor saxophones
- Matt Kelleghan – drums, percussion
