= Blue Eyes (Don Partridge song) =

Single by Don Partridge
- B-side: "I've Got Something For You"
- Released: 1968
- Genre: pop
- Length: 2:28
- Label: Columbia
- Songwriters: Richard Kerr and Joan Maitland

Don Partridge singles chronology
"Rosie" (1968)	"Blue Eyes" (1968)	"Top Man" (1968)

"Blue Eyes" is a 1968 pop song by Don Partridge, written by Richard Kerr and Joan Maitland.

== Song history ==
"Blue Eyes" was released in 1968, reaching number one in the Irish Singles Chart in July 1968. It peaked at number 14 on the New Zealand Listener chart.

== See also ==
- List of number-one singles of 1968 (Ireland)
