= Moving Hearts =

Irish Celtic rock band

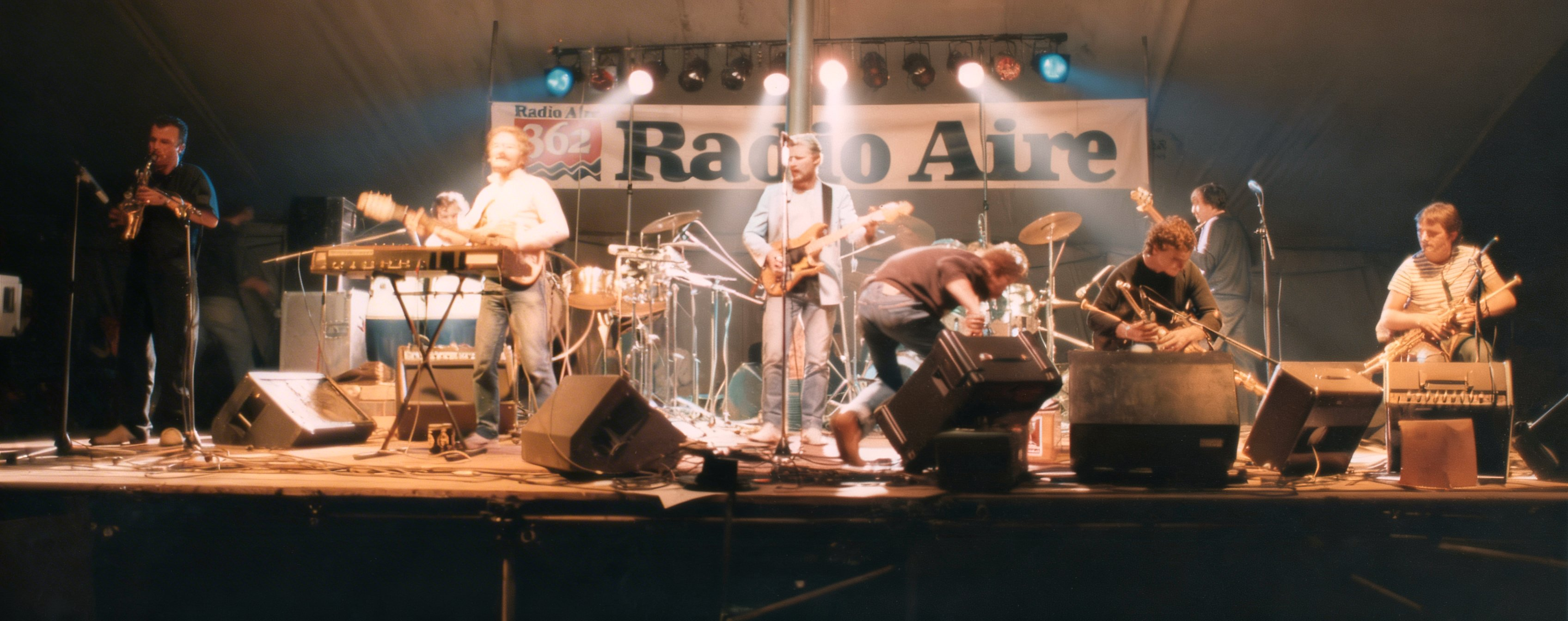
- Moving Hearts on stage at the Leeds Folk Festival, 1983

Background information
- Origin: Dublin, Ireland
- Genres: Celtic rock, folk rock
- Years active: 1981 to 1985; 2007; Intermittently later
- Members: Davy Spillane; Eoghan O'Neill; Keith Donald; Noel Eccles; Anton Drennan; Graham Henderson; Liam Bradley
- Past members: Dónal Lunny (Died 2026); Christy Moore; Declan Sinnott; Mick Hanly; Brian Calnan; Declan Masterson; Greg Boland; Kevin Glackin; Matt Kellaghan; Flo McSweeney; Jimmy Smyth; James Delaney
- Website: movingheartsmusic.com

Moving Hearts is an Irish Celtic rock band formed in 1981. They followed in the footsteps of Horslips in combining Irish traditional music with rock and roll, and also added elements of jazz to their sound.

== Career ==
The group was formed in 1981 when Dónal Lunny (bouzouki) and Christy Moore (vocals, guitar and bodhrán), of Planxty, wanted to explore the possibilities of linking contemporary music to Irish traditional music. They initially intended to form a trio with guitarist Declan Sinnott, but then expanded the group to include established Irish musicians Keith Donald (alto sax), Eoghan O'Neill (bass), Brian Calnan (drums), and Davy Spillane (uilleann pipes). In their first year together, Moving Hearts performed to packed audiences during their three-night-a-week residency at the Baggot Inn on Baggot Street in Dublin.

This laid the basis for a powerful, new Irish sound, which was coupled on the band's first two albums, Moving Hearts and The Dark End of the Street, with songs of explicit political engagement, often concerning the situation in Northern Ireland. The band was organised as a cooperative effort, with all profits and costs borne by the seven band members and three members of the road crew.

Calnan was replaced for the group's second album by Matt Kelleghan, and, in 1982, Moore left to pursue his solo career and was replaced by Mick Hanly.

Moving Hearts played many prestigious gigs including the Montreux Jazz Festival, The Bottom Line in New York and the Lorient Festival in Brittany, and the line-up with Hanly was recorded on the 1983 album Live Hearts. They also played on two tracks on Van Morrison's 1983 album A Sense of Wonder.

For a period after Hanly's departure, Flo McSweeney and Anthony Drennan came in on vocals and lead guitar. The following year the group performed as an instrumental group, recording the album The Storm. At this point the line-up consisted of Spillane and Declan Masterson on uilleann pipes, Lunny on bouzouki, synthesiser & bodhrán, Donald on sax, Noel Eccles on percussion, Matt Kelleghan on drums, O'Neill on bass and Greg Boland on guitar.

The group ceased touring in 1984, appearing only at occasional festivals such as the Preseli Folk Festival–now the Fishguard Folk Festival–in 1986. In 1990, the band performed at Dublin's Point Theatre for a sold out farewell concert, with McSweeney on vocals.

Moving Hearts re-formed in 2007, announcing concerts in Dublin and at the Hebridean Celtic Festival in Stornoway. The new line-up was: Lunny, Spillane, O'Neill, Donald, Kellaghan, Eccles, Drennan, Kevin Glackin and Graham Henderson.

They continue to reunite for occasional concerts every few years. The 2022 line up is Lunny, Spillane, Donald, O'Neill, Eccles, Drennan, Bradley and Henderson.

== Discography ==
=== Studio albums ===
- Moving Hearts (1981)
- Dark End of the Street (1982)
- The Storm (1985)

=== Live albums ===
- Live Hearts (1983)
- Live in Dublin (Recorded 2007, released 2008)
- Live in Dublin Vinyl Double Album (Recorded 2007, released 2020)

=== Compilation albums ===
- Anthology (1981) – Vinyl LP with 9 tracks from two studio albums (Moving Hearts & Dark End of the Street)
- Dark End of the Street (1981) – Musicassette with two entire studio albums (Moving Hearts & Dark End of the Street)
- Dark End of the Street (1982) – Vinyl LP with 10 tracks from two studio albums (Moving Hearts & Dark End of the Street)
- Dónal Lunny's Definitive Moving Hearts (2003) – CD with 13 tracks
- The Platinum Collection (2007) – CD with 14 tracks

== Filmography ==
- Live in Dublin (Recorded 2007, released 2008) – DVD
