= Don Partridge =

English singer-songwriter (1941–2010)

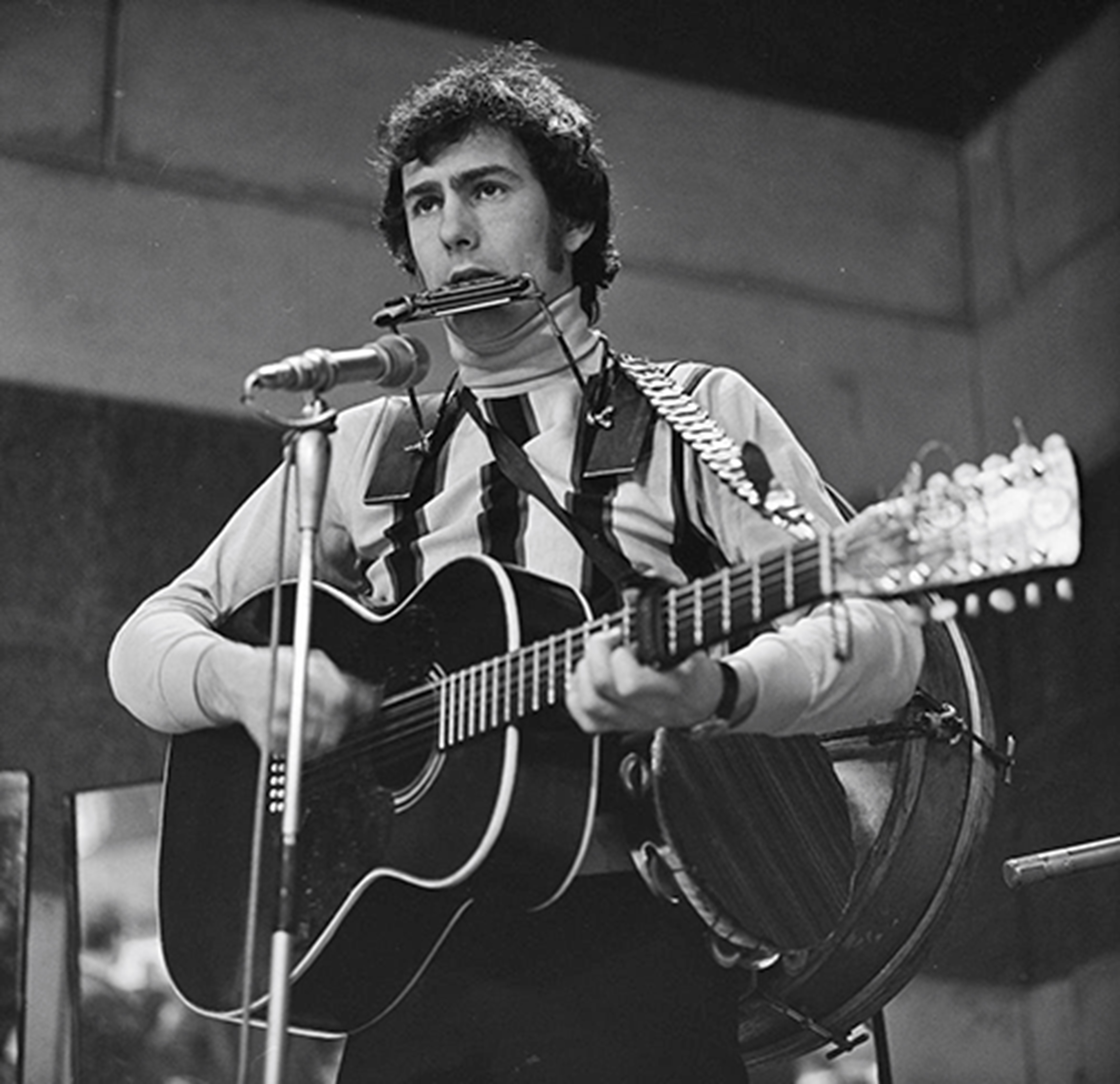
- Don Partridge (1968)

Background information
- Born: Donald Eric Partridge; 27 October 1941; Bournemouth, England
- Died: 21 September 2010 (aged 68) Peacehaven, East Sussex, England
- Genres: Pop, folk, folk rock, blues
- Occupations: Singer-songwriter, busker, one-man band, multi-instrumentalist
- Instruments: Vocals, guitar, harmonica, kazoo, drums, cymbals, tambourine, vibes, foot-base
- Years active: Early 1960s–2010
- Labels: Columbia, Capitol, Regal Zonophone, LongMan Records

Donald Eric Partridge (27 October 1941 – 21 September 2010) was an English singer-songwriter, known as the "king of the buskers". He performed from the early 1960s, first as a folk singer and later as a busker and one-man band, and achieved unexpected commercial success in the UK and Europe in the late 1960s with the songs "Rosie", "Blue Eyes" and "Breakfast on Pluto". He later was a founder of the group Accolade, which released two albums. He continued writing music, playing, busking and recording, mainly as a solo artist, until 2008.

== Early life ==
Partridge was born on 27 October 1941, in Bournemouth, England. When he was six, his family moved to Earl's Court in West London. His father, Eric, was a jazz guitarist and gave Don a ukulele as a child, which he mostly learned George Formby songs on.

By his own account, he left home at age 15 and became a burglar, before working at some 45 different jobs. In July 1963, he was reported in the national newspapers when he jumped off Hammersmith Bridge, London, equipped with home-made wings, trying to fly.

== Career ==
=== Busking ===
In the early 1960s, he developed his busking and performing skills firstly in London and Continental Europe, later in 1963 busking around the coastal towns of South West England with fellow guitarist Alan Young and also playing at British and Irish folk clubs, initially singing British, Irish and American folk songs and blues with a guitar. In 1964, he and his friend Alan Young were described in the Evening Standard as the first young street musicians to be seen in London since World War II. Later, inspired by American singer Jesse Fuller, he constructed his first one-man band and started writing some of his own compositions. In London in 1966, together with fellow busker Pat Keene as "The Brotherhood", he recorded his first album entitled Singin' 'n' Sole-in.

Soon afterwards, he found that he gained more attention by performing as a one-man band, playing guitar, kazoo or harmonica (both held on a harness), bass drum (on his back), cymbals and tambourine at the same time. He was frequently arrested and fined, but gained a local following and made TV appearances on several shows, including the Eamonn Andrews Show.

=== Professional ===
Record company executive Don Paul, previously of rock and roll group The Viscounts, then won him a recording contract with Columbia Records. His debut recording of his own song, "Rosie", reached No. 4 in the UK Singles Chart in March 1968. Following its success, Partridge quit busking for a more orthodox professional singing career. On 5 April 1968, Partridge appeared alongside Amen Corner, Gene Pitney, Status Quo and Simon Dupree and the Big Sound at The Odeon Theatre, Lewisham, London, on the opening night of a twice nightly UK tour covering 27 venues in 32 days. Later in May 1968, he performed at the NME Musical Awards Show at Empire Pool, Wembley, to a crowd of 10,000 alongside multiple artists including the Rolling Stones. His second hit quickly followed when "Blue Eyes" reached No. 3 in June 1968, and he was featured on the front cover of the pop weekly Disc. He also released a self-titled LP, which included folk and blues songs by Lead Belly, Big Bill Broonzy and Oscar Brand along with versions of Otis Redding's "(Sittin' On) The Dock of the Bay" and Robin Williamson's "First Girl I Loved", and several of his own compositions. He spent the summer of 1968 performing nightly shows at Blackpool Pier, alongside Solomon King, Les Dawson and others. His third single "Top Man", however, failed to make the UK chart.

Intending a farewell to his street musician friends, he hired the Royal Albert Hall in January 1969 and put on a "Buskers Concert" before an audience of 3,700, featuring buskers (including Dave Brock, later of Hawkwind), who would all share the profits equally. A concert album, The Buskers, was released in 1969, and Partridge's single "Breakfast on Pluto" reached No. 26 on the UK chart. Partridge later assembled a Buskers' Tour, including Dave Brock and guitarist Gordon Giltrap, which travelled to concert venues around the UK in an old London Transport red double-decker bus, delivering buskers concerts at ten different venues, including sell-outs in Oxford and Newcastle – until the bus finally died on the M6 near Preston, and the buskers had to hitch-hike to reach the next concert venue in Glasgow. In July 1969, Partridge starred with Love Affair, Status Quo, Alan Price, Yes, Grapefruit and Jimmy James & The Vagabonds in an Oxfam charity concert held at Wembley Stadium. He also journeyed to the US to promote the Tom Courtenay movie Otley, which featured his song "Homeless Bones" as the opening theme.

By autumn 1969, together with Gordon Giltrap and other members, he had founded the group Accolade. This was an acoustic band, who developed a style of folk/jazz fusion. They recorded two albums (the second after Giltrap had left) and one single, before finally splitting up in 1971. Partridge returned to busking and, after journeying throughout England and Wales in a gypsy caravan, later moved to Sweden where, in 1974, he recorded the album Don Partridge and Friends. He continued to write music based on his relationships, travels and experiences, then formed a new group in Sweden called Slim Volume which toured the country giving concerts based on original songs.

In 1976, he travelled as a busker throughout Canada, and played at the Montreal Olympic Games. He later toured much of Western Europe busking, spending prolonged periods in Gothenburg, Copenhagen, Munich and Amsterdam before returning to Sweden. In 1982, the album Street Harvest was recorded and released in Stockholm, based mainly on his own compositions with acoustic guitar arrangements. Don later returned to England, living first in Barwell, Leicestershire then on a canal barge in Barrow Upon Soar, followed by Brixham, Devon, before finally settling in Seaford, Sussex, in 1990.

In 2001, he recorded the album The Highwayman, with accompaniment by Herbie Flowers, Nick Pynn and Richard Durrant. The album contained tracks inspired by Partridge's experiences of life on the road, including the autobiographical song "The Night I Met Elton John" and a treatment of Alfred Noyes’ poem "The Highwayman". In 2005, Partridge returned to public attention when his song "Breakfast on Pluto" was included in the soundtrack to the film Breakfast on Pluto. Partridge joined indie pop/trip hop duo Lemon Jelly on tour in the UK the same year. He also made two appearances on the BBC Television comedy music quiz show, Never Mind The Buzzcocks.

== Personal life and death ==
Partridge was married three times, and had four daughters and two sons. His third wife, Pam, died a year before him in 2009.

Partridge died of a heart attack while out on a walk on 21 September 2010, aged 68, in Peacehaven. At the time of his death, he lived on Downland Avenue, in Peacehaven. His wake was held in Seaford and lasted seven hours.

Bus 940 in Brighton and Hove was named after him in April 2015, until March 2024, when the name was moved to bus 709.

== Discography ==
=== Singles ===
Year	A-side	Songwriters	B-side	Songwriters	UK
1968	"Rosie"	Don Partridge	"Going Back to London"	Don Partridge	4
1968	"Blue Eyes"	Richard Kerr and Joan Maitland	"I've Got Something For You"	Don Partridge	3
1968	"Top Man"	Richard Kerr and Joan Maitland	"We Have Ways of Making You Laugh"	Don Partridge	
1969	"Homeless Bones"	Stanley Myers and Don Partridge	"We Have Ways of Making You Laugh"	Don Partridge	
1969	"Breakfast on Pluto"	Don Partridge and Alan Young	"Stealin'	Traditionally arranged by Don Partridge	26
1969	"Going To Germany"	Traditionally arranged by Don Partridge	"Ask Me Why"	Don Partridge	
1969	"Colour My World"	Jonathan Peel and Richard Kerr	"Homeless Bones"	Stanley Myers and Don Partridge	
1970	"We're All Happy Together"	Don Partridge	"Following Your Fancy"	Don Partridge	
1970	"Natural Day"	Don Partridge	"Prelude to a Dawn"	Brian Cresswell	
1982	"Grand Slam Boogie"	Don Partridge	"Barb Wire"	Don Partridge	

=== EPs ===
Year	Title	Tracks
1965	"Singing Soho Style"	1. "The False Bride"; 2. "Raggle Taggle Gypsies"; 3. "The Minstrel Boy"; 4. "Jerusalem"

=== Albums ===
Year	Label	Title	Tracks	Notes
1968	Columbia Records	Don Partridge	1. "Following Your Fancy" (Don Partridge); 2. "Keep Your Hands Off Her" (Lead Belly); 3. "7 Days Chokey" (R. Kerr / J. Maitland); 4. "The Wayward Boy" (Oscar Brand); 5. "St. James Infirmary" (Joe Primrose); 6. "I'm A Goin' Away" (Don Partridge); 7. "Blue Eyes" (R. Kerr / J. Maitland); 8. "(Sittin' On) The Dock of the Bay" (S. Cropper / O. Redding); 9. "Old Joe Clark" (Trad. arr. Don Partridge); 10. "First Girl I Loved" (Robin Williamson); 11. "Candy Man" (Arr. and adapt. Donovan); 12. "Black, Brown & White Blues" (Bill Broonzy); 13. "Mona's Song" (Don Partridge); 14. "Rosie" (Don Partridge)	
1973	Sonogram Records	Don Partridge and Friends	1. "Happy Birthday Ruthy Baby" (B. Gallagher / G. Lyle); 2. "Bring It On Home" (Sonny Boy Williamson); 3. "Honey Pie" (J. Lennon / P. McCartney); 4. "Hey Baby" (M. Cobb / B. Channel); 5. "Blue Suede Shoes" (Carl Perkins); 6. "Midnight Special" (Trad. arr Partridge); 7. "I Am The Master of the Revels (sung as: Rebels)" (P. Atkin / C. James); 8. "Gorillas" (Don Partridge); 9. "Honky Tonk Women" (M. Jagger / K. Richard); 10. "Creases in My Jeans" (Don Partridge); 11. "She Left Me" (Don Partridge); 12. "Thank You For Being A Stranger" (Don Partridge); 13. "Your Disguises" (Don Partridge)	
1982	Europa Film Records	Street Harvest	1. "Grand Slam Boogie" (Don Partridge); 2. "Trans Canadian Highway" (Don Partridge); 3. "Whipsnade Zoo" (Don Partridge); 4. "Your Disguises" (Don Partridge); 5. "Elizabeth" (Don Partridge); 6. "Trans World Blues" (Don Partridge); 7. "Copenhagen Summer Nights" (Don Partridge); 8. "Barb Wire" (Don Partridge); 9. "Pakalolo Lady" (Don Partridge)	
2004	LongMan Records	The Highwayman	1. "Jenny" (Don Partridge); 2. "Buskers' Greens" (Don Partridge); 3. "Surrender" (Don Partridge); 4. "The Highwayman" (Don Partridge); 5. "Copenhagen Summer Nights" (Don Partridge); 6. "Eclipse" (Don Partridge); 7. "Sector 5,9" (Don Partridge); 8. "Elderberry Wine" (Don Partridge); 9. "Trans Canadian Highway" (Don Partridge); 10. "Pakalolo Lady" (Don Partridge); 11. "The Night I Met Elton John" (Don Partridge)	
2005		Uncreased		A privately produced album (on CD-R) produced by Bob Evans who also named it.; Uncreased contained some of his old hits and also new material.; It was recorded over a six-month period and featured some local talent from the Seaford area.; It was Partridge's last recording.

=== Soundtracks and compilations ===
- Singin' 'n Sole-in – (1966) - The Brotherhood, duo comprising Don Partridge & Pat Keene; arrangements of US blues, folk & gospel, plus British folk songs (Fontana Records TL 5390)
- Popdown – (1967) – (film soundtrack – Partridge appeared as himself in the movie, alongside Julie Driscoll, Zoot Money, Andy Summers, Brenton Wood and Tony Hicks)
- Otley – (1968) – (film soundtrack opens with the song "Homeless Bones" – co-composed and sung by Partridge)
- The Buskers – (1969) – live recording of Royal Albert Hall "Buskers Concert" – (Columbia Records)
- The Kerbside Entertainers – (1971) - includes four folk songs/hymns with vocals & acoustic guitar by Partridge (President Records / Jay Boy JSX 2009)
  - "I Once Loved a Lass" (Trad. arr. Partridge - also known as "The False Bride")
  - "The Minstrel Boy" (Thomas Moore)
  - "Raggle Taggle Gypsies" (Trad. Scottish, arr. Partridge)
  - "Jerusalem" (W. Blake / H. Parry)
- Rosie and Other Hits – (1995) – (compilation of first solo album and single releases) – (Oxford Records)
- Breakfast on Pluto – (2005) – (film soundtrack includes Partridge's hit song "Breakfast on Pluto", after which the book and its later film were named)

=== Accolade albums ===
Year	Label	Title	Tracks
1970	Capitol Records / Columbia Records	Accolade	1. "Maiden Flight Eliza" (Gordon Giltrap); 2. "Starting All Over" (Gordon Giltrap); 3. "Prelude to a Dawn" (Brian Cresswell); 4. "Never Ending Solitude" (Gordon Giltrap); 5. "Nature Boy" (Eden Ahbez); 6. "Calico" (Don Partridge); 7. "Ulysses" (Don Partridge); 8. "Go on Home" (Don Partridge)
1971	Regal Zonophone Records	Accolade 2	1. "Transworld Blues" (Don Partridge); 2. "The Spider to The Spy" (Don Partridge); 3. "Baby Take Your Rags Off" (Don Partridge); 4. "Cross Continental Pandemonium Theatre Company" (Don Partridge, arr. Hoyle / Pool / Cresswell); 5. "Snakes in a Hole" (Wadnius/Borgudd); 6. "The Time I've Wasted" (Don Partridge); 7. "Sector Five Nine" (Don Partridge); 8. "If Only I'd Known" (Wizz Jones); 9. "William Taplin" (Gordon Giltrap); 10. "Long Way To Go" (Don Partridge)

=== Accolade singles ===
Year	Label	A-side	Songwriters	B-side	Songwriters
1970	Columbia Records	"Natural Day"	Don Partridge	"Prelude to A Dawn"	Brian Cresswell
