= Mike Hanrahan =

American singer-songwriter and guitarist

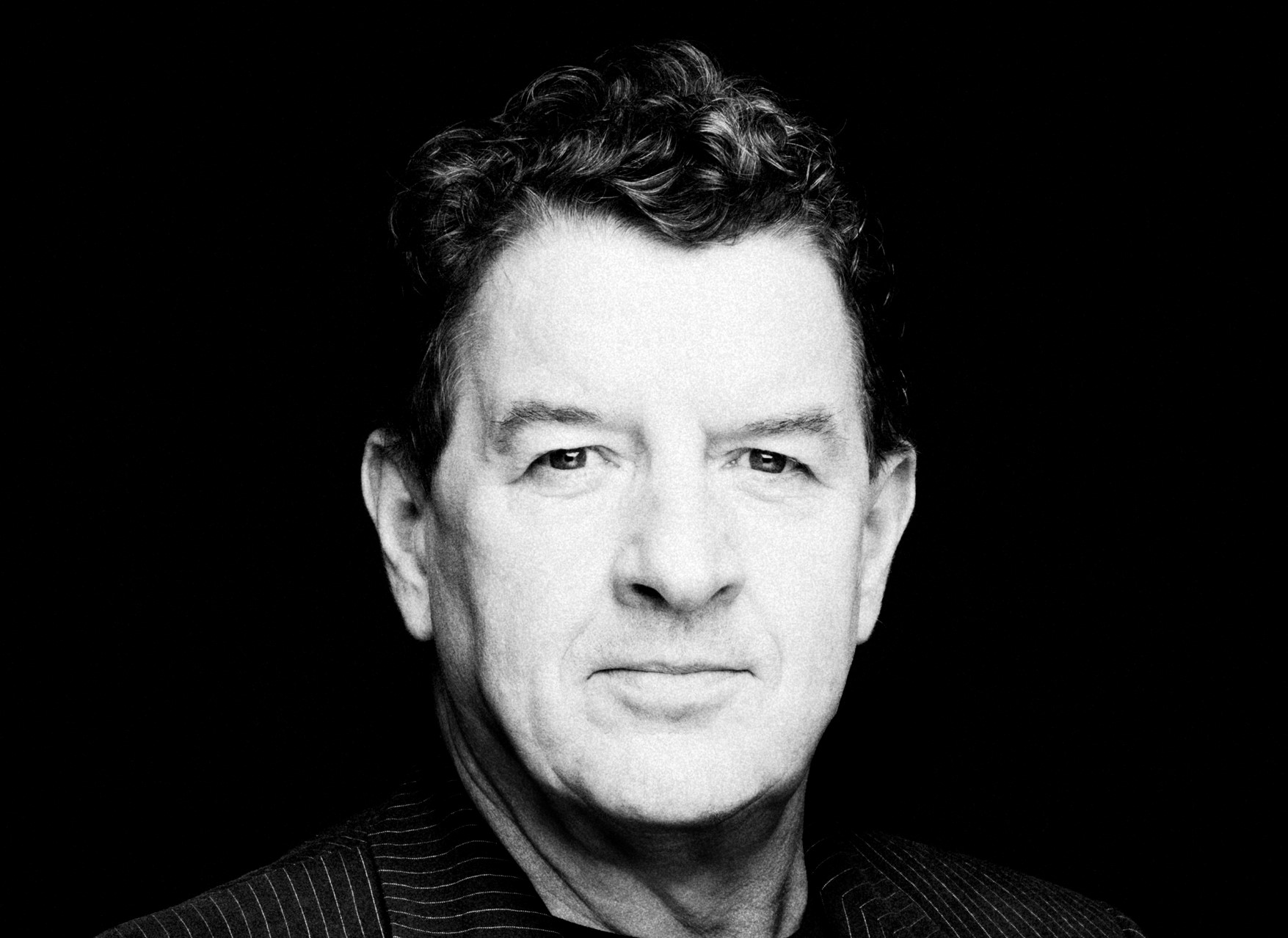
Mike Hanrahan

Mike Hanrahan is a singer-songwriter and guitarist born in Ennis, County Clare, in September 1958.

Mike spent fifteen years with Stockton's Wing as songwriter, guitarist and singer, and ten years with Ronnie Drew as guitarist, writer and producer.

12 years on the board of IMRO Irish Music Rights Organisation, from 1994 to 2006. Three of those years he served as Deputy Chairman of IMRO, and six years as chairman.2000 to 2006

BOOK 2019 A memoir [Beautiful affair a journey in Music, Food and Friendship] Published by Harper Collins

FILM 2021 The ballad of the crimson warrior, inspired by the Irish Cultural Revolution 1890/1922 written and created by Mike Hanrahan and Aldoc with contributions from Irish artist Mick O Dea

2023 Fellow at Global Brain Health Institute (GBHI) TRINITY COLLEGE DUBLIN

== Career ==
In 1977, began his professional career with Maura O'Connell in a duo called Tumbleweed. In 1979, Mike Hanrahan replaced Tony Callanan in Stockton's Wing and recorded Take a Chance. In 1980 Hanrahan recorded A Light in the Western Sky with Stockton's Wing, which featured six of Hanrahan's songs, including hit singles Beautiful Affair and Walkaway. In 1994, He left Stockton's Wing after 15 years and several albums to tour with Finbar Furey as guitarist and recorded two albums.

He released a solo album, Someone Like You, 1994, with Wundertutte Germany. Released in Ireland on Crashed Music 1997.

WITH RONNIE DREW 1997 to 2008. In 1997 Ronnie Drew theatre show [Ronnie I Hardly Knew Ya] Mike produced Ronnie solo album The Humour Is on Me Now, 1999. An Evening with Ronnie Drew and Mike Hanrahan.2004. Toured extensively with Ronnie.

He produced and performed on the Ronnie Drew and Eleanor Shanley Live album 2001 and the studio album "El Amore de mi Vida" (2004).

In 2011 Stockton's Wing, reunion concerts. 2012, live shows with Leslie Dowdall from In Tua Nua.

In 2016, created a theatre show Dublin Burning with Brendan Begley, commemorating the music and songs of 1916.Stocktons Wing returned in 2017 and 2018 to celebrate their 40th anniversary.Beautiful Affair, a recollective released by Universal Ireland / Tara. Reached number one Vinyl / CD

A song [A river rolls on] recorded with Dementia inclusive choir [The Forgetmenots choir]2021 A live album Stocktons Wing Hometown released 2022.

A series of new songs from Songs from the box room project with Gavin Glass released 2022/23.

Film and soundtrack [The ballad of the crimson warrior] released 2023.

He is a trained cook and teacher from Ballymaloe Organic farm and Cookery school.

His book Beautiful Affair, a journey in music.food and friendship was shortlisted 2019 National Irish Book Awards.

2023 studying at Trinity College Dublin with Global Brain Health Institute.
