= Mary from Dungloe (festival) =

Irish music festival in Dungloe, County Donegal

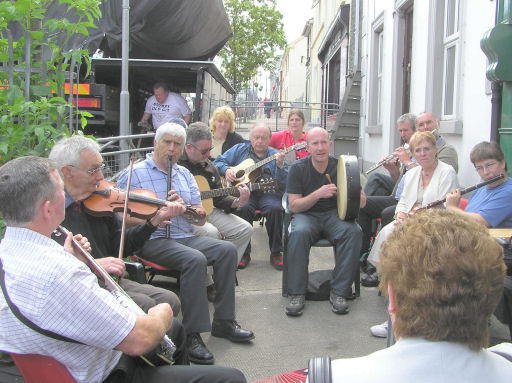
A typical scene at the Mary From Dungloe Festival, 2005.

The Mary From Dungloe International Festival is an Irish music festival held annually, usually at the end of July in the small town of Dungloe, County Donegal. The festival is centred on a pageant to find out which contestant has the spirit of the festival, who is then crowned "Mary From Dungloe". The winner of the contest holds this title for a year and acts as an ambassador for the festival. Irish emigrant communities from around the world, as well as some Irish counties and towns, participate by nominating a young woman, endearingly titled a "Mary", to represent their community at the contest. The festival has grown in popularity over the years and now regularly attracts tens of thousands of visitors to the area. The festival is inspired by the song "Mary from Dungloe" as the Rose of Tralee festival is by "The Rose of Tralee". In 2019, the festival celebrated its 52nd anniversary, with Roisin Maher from New York becoming Mary From Dungloe 2019.

== Participating communities ==
Many communities around the world with links to County Donegal have their own local contests to pick their community's "Mary" who subsequently is nominated to travel to Dungloe to compete in the Mary From Dungloe contest. Irish communities who have entered contestants include:

- Antrim
- Armagh
- Bayonne, New Jersey
- Belfast
- Birmingham
- Cavan
- Chicago
- Connacht
- Cork
- Kildare
- Derry
- Donegal
- Down
- Dubai
- Dungloe
- Dublin
- Edinburgh
- Fermanagh
- France
- An Ghaeltacht
- Galway
- Glasgow
- India
- Limerick
- London
- Louth
- Manchester
- Mayo
- Meath
- Melbourne
- Miami
- Midlands (Ireland)
- Midlands (UK)
- Monaghan
- North East England
- Tipperary
- New York
- Washington DC
- Philadelphia
- Roscommon
- San Francisco
- Spain
- Sydney
- Tyrone
- Waterford
- Wicklow
- Wild Atlantic Way
- Wilkes-Barre, Pennsylvania

== Traditional festival events ==
There are a number of traditional events which are run every year as part of the festival. Here are just a few examples:

Event	Traditional Location
Opening Ceremony	Main St.
Introduction of MFD Contestants	Main St.
Country Sunday	Main St.
Lá Gaelach	Main St.
Open Air Music	Main St.
Art Exhibition	Sharkey's Service Station / Ionad Teampaill Chróine
McGurk's Fun Fair	The Cope Car Park, Quay Road
Childrens Sports Day	CLG An Clochán Liath/Dungloe GAA Grounds
Men's Golf Open	Cruit Island Golf Club
Ladies Golf Open	Cruit Island Golf Club
Treasure Hunt	Main St. starting point
Annual 5K Road Race	Main St. & surrounds
Fly Fishing Competition	Dungloe Marina
Little Miss Mary Competition	Parochial Hall/ CDP na Rosann
Table Quiz	Maghery Community Centre/ Midway Bar & Restaurant
Junior Table Quiz	Ionad Teampall Cróine
Social Evening with the Marys	Various
Historic Tour of the Rosses	Departs Main St.
Walk the Rosses	Dungloe area, Leitir/Lettermacaward, Maghery, Rann na Feirste, Loch an Iúir, Burtonport
Interviewing of the MFD Contestants	Carrickfinn Airport / Rosses Community School
Bonny Baby Show	Parochial Hall
Daniel O'Donnell in Concert	Festival Dome
Carnival Parade	Main St.
Band Competition	Main St.
MFD Contest Final	Festival Dome / Ionad Spóirt na Rosann
Gala Ball	Waterfront Hotel
Closing Ceremony	Main St.

== 2026 Contestants ==
The 2026 'Marys' for the festival were:

- Katie McClafferty – Connacht
- Rhiana Wasson – Donegal
- Caoimhe Bermingham – Dublin
- Shauna McDonagh – Dungloe
- Cara Molloy – Edinburgh
- Jamie-Mai Nic Giolla Easbuic – Gaeltacht
- Maria Neely – Glasgow
- Maria Boner – Liverpool
- Eva O’Sullivan – London
- Clodagh Doughty – Midlands
- Nellie Fitzpatrick – New York
- Molly Russell – North East England
- Kylie Brogan – Philadelphia
- Katie Sweeney – Ulster
- Gracie Trimble – Wild Atlantic Way

Eva O'Sullivan, the London Mary, was crowned the 2026 Mary from Dungloe on 2 August 2025.

== Contest winners ==
Below is a complete list of contest winners from 1968 to 2024.

Year	Winner	Represented	Originally From	Age
1968	Celine Powell	Dublin	Galway	
1969	Marie McGlinchey	Donegal		
1970	Monina Hughes	Armagh		
1971	Gloria O'Boyle	Donegal	Bunbeg, Gweedore	
1972	Carole Mary Carr	Limerick		
1973	Nora Boyle	Donegal	Burndennet, County Tyrone	
1974	Maribel Lopez Del Hoya	Spain		
1975	Maureen Temple	Londonderry		
1976	Anne Marie McDaid	Derry		
1977	Sheila T Boyle	Bayonne		
1978	Bernice McElroy	Down	Warrenpoint, County Down	18
1979	Ann O'Callaghan	Louth		
1980	Marie Coyle	Glasgow		
1981	Noreen Galligan	An Ghaeltacht		
1982	Debbie O'Brien	Manchester		17
1983	Máire McCole	Dungloe		
1984	Anne Marie Moloney	New York	Jackson Heights	18
1985	Sheila Hughes	Mayo		
1986	Linda Farrell	Louth		22
1987	Maria McGovern	Dublin	Dublin	
1988	Maureen Connelly	Wilkes-Barre, Pennsylvania	New York	24
1989	Carmel Kelly	Donegal	Donegal	
1990	Anne Marie Downes	Louth		
1991	Pamela Sheridan	Meath		
1992	Paula O'Reilly	Monaghan		
1993	Samantha Pairman	North East England		
1994	Sarah Mulholland	Dungloe	Kincasslagh	21
1995	Kathleen McMahon	New York	New York	20
1996	Siobhan Bignell	Melbourne	London, England	24
1997	Heather Stewart	Edinburgh		
1998	Brighid Williams	Sydney		
1999	Ciara Diver	Derry	Portstewart, County Londonderry	
2000	Shirley McGlynn	Manchester	Dublin	21
2001	Fiona Mwaka Callan	Wicklow	Zambia / Arklow	19
2002	Jolene McMonagle	An Ghealtacht	Falcarragh	22
2003	Aisling Friel	Glasgow	Glasgow	21
2004	Lisa Mc Kelvey	Dungloe	Dungloe	20
2005	Katie Armstrong	Philadelphia	Philadelphia	25
2006	Jennifer Halton	Kildare	Kildare	22
2007	Kerry Sweeney	Edinburgh	Edinburgh	21
2008	Una Rooney	Armagh	Armagh	24
2009	Kate Ferguson	Derry	Derry	25
2010	Jemma Ferry	Edinburgh	Edinburgh	22
2011	Debbie Rodgers	Dungloe	Burtonport	21
2012	Meghan Davis	Philadelphia	Wilkes-Barre, PA	26
2013	Grace Sweeney	Glasgow	Glasgow	27
2014	Kate Linsay	Sydney	Sydney	19
2015	Siobhan Dunn	Edinburgh	Edinburgh	28
2016	Eva Ní Dhoibhlinn	Gaeltacht	Gweedore	20
2017	Alisha Medford	Glasgow	Glasgow	20
2018	Caroline O'Donnell	Dungloe	Leffin	25
2019–2022	Róisín Maher	New York	Carlow	27
2021 Virtual Mary	Alannagh Nic Fhloinn	Pleanáil Teanga (Gaeltacht)	Sheskinarone	22
2022	Caitlin Finn	London	Ballybofey / London / Letterkenny	21
2023	Adele Morgan	Dubai	Glasgow	28
2024	Clare O’Donnell	Donegal	Letterkenny	26
2025	Ellie Ward	Dungloe	Dungloe	19
2026	Eva O'Sullivan	London	London	21

== Entertainers and musicians ==
Many Irish and international acts have performed at the festival over the years. The traditional annual crowd puller, however, continues to be internationally renowned folk singer Daniel O'Donnell, who made his festival debut in 1985.

- Daniel O'Donnell, Boyzone, Brian Kennedy, Donal Lunny, Altan, The Hothouse Flowers, Goats Don't Shave, Nathan Carter, Christy Moore, The Sawdoctors, Paul Brady, Shane McGowan.
- Barry Sinclair, Jimmy Buckley, Hugo Duncan, Mad Dog Macrea, Louise DaCosta, Riverdance, Jake Carter and many more.

== Famous comperes ==
The Mary From Dungloe contest final has been compered by a number of famous faces.

- Gay Byrne
- Daniel O'Donnell
- Marty Whelan
- Pat Kenny
- Thelma Mansfield
- Gerry Kelly
- Noel Cunningham
- Dave O'Connor
