= Midnight Well =

- Origin: Ireland
- Genres: Folk
- Years active: 1976–present
- Members: Thom Moore, Janie Cribbs, Gerry O'Beirne and Mairtín Ó Connor

Midnight Well are a foursome consisting of Thom Moore, Janie Cribbs, Gerry O'Beirne and Mairtín Ó Connor. They were formed in the mid-seventies and issued one, self-titled, album in 1977. Prior to the Sligo Live Festival appearance in October 2008 they had not performed together for 27 years.

According to the festival program -

Janie Cribbs is still performing as a singer and songwriter in the US; Gerry O'Beirne (Patrick Street, Sharon Shannon, Waterboys, etc.) has had lots of success as a guitarist, singer, producer and songwriter; and of course Mairtín Ó Connor (Boys of the Lough, Skylark, De Dannan) is one of our most famous accordionists.

Thom Moore was an American-born singer-songwriter with strong Irish connections. Among the songs he composed were "Saw You Running", "Still Believing", "Cavan Girl", "The Scholar" (aka "Train to Sligo") and "Carolina Rua". His songs have been recorded by Mary Black, The Dubliners, Rita Connolly, Danny Doyle, Barleycorn, Paddy Reilly, Mary Coughlan, Clannad and Maura O'Connell among others.

Thom Moore died in March 2018, at age 74.

== Podcasts ==
You can hear an Interview with Thom Moore and exclusive recordings of "Cavan Girl", The Scholar", "Carolina Rua" and "Bright Spots" at http://www.podcasts.ie/featured-musicians/thom-moore/
