= Eat the Peach =

1986 Irish film by Peter Ormrod

- Directed by: Peter Ormrod
- Written by: Peter Ormrod; John Kelleher
- Produced by: John Kelleher
- Starring: Stephen Brennan; Eamon Morissey; Catherine Byrne; Joe Lynch; Tony Doyle; Takashi Kawahara; Victoria Armstrong; Niall Toibin
- Cinematography: Arthur Wooster
- Edited by: J. Patrick Duffner
- Music by: Donal Lunny
- Production companies: Bórd Scannán na hÉireann/Irish Film Board; Channel 4 Films
- Distributed by: United International Pictures (UK/Ireland)
- Release date: 14 March 1986 (Ireland)
- Country: Ireland
- Language: English
- Budget: IR£1,390,000

Eat the Peach is a 1986 Irish comedy film, directed by Peter Ormrod. The title derives from the T. S. Eliot poem "The Love Song of J. Alfred Prufrock." It was written by Peter Ormrod with John Kelleher.

== Filming ==
Eat The Peach was filmed on location in the Bog of Allen, County Kildare, and in Counties Dublin, Meath and Wicklow, Ireland. The site in Dublin was at Newcastle, County Dublin. Motorcycle stunts were performed by riders from Messhams Wall Of Death.

== Plot ==
County Kildare, the 1980s. When a Japanese company pulls out of Ireland, leaving several local men redundant, two of them take inspiration from the film Roustabout and build their own wall of death on the Bog of Allen. They begin smuggling goods across the Irish border in order to finance it, and try and receive television coverage and public support.

== Soundtrack ==
The music was written by Dónal Lunny and centres around the song co-written with Paul Brady - "Eat The Peach" from his solo album Primitive Dance. Paul Brady performs the song as the credits roll. The soundtrack also includes uilleann pipes throughout the film. These were likely provided by Davy Spillane, who played on the album track.
