= Dónal Lunny =

Irish folk musician and producer (1947–2026)

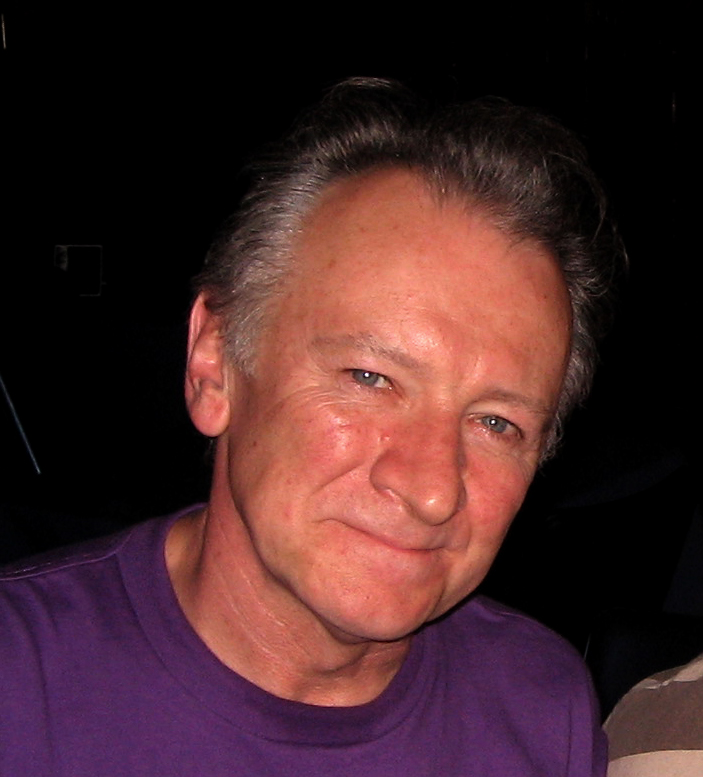
- Lunny in 2006

Background information
- Born: 10 March 1947; Tullamore, County Offaly, Ireland
- Died: 23 October 2026 (aged 79) Dublin, Ireland
- Genres: Irish traditional music; Celtic; folk; rock
- Occupations: Musician; songwriter; record producer
- Instruments: Vocals; guitar; bouzouki; keyboards; bodhrán
- Years active: 1966–2026
- Formerly of: Emmet Spiceland; Planxty; The Bothy Band; Mozaik; Moving Hearts; Usher's Island
- Website: donallunny.com

Dónal Lunny (10 March 1947 – 23 October 2026) was an Irish folk musician and producer. He played guitar and bouzouki, as well as keyboards and bodhrán. As a founding member of popular bands Planxty, The Bothy Band, Moving Hearts, Coolfin, Mozaik, LAPD, and Usher's Island, he was at the forefront of the renaissance of Irish traditional music for over five decades. In 2025, he was the recipient of the RTÉ Radio 1 Folk Awards Lifetime Achievement Award.

== Early life and education ==
Lunny was born in Tullamore on 10 March 1947. His father Frank was from Enniskillen in County Fermanagh and his mother, Mary Rogers, came from Ranafast in The Rosses in County Donegal; they raised four boys and five girls. The family moved to Newbridge in County Kildare when Dónal was five years old.

He attended secondary school at Newbridge College and in 1963 joined the Patrician Brothers' school for the Intermediate Certificate year. As a teenager, Lunny joined an occasional trio called Rakes of Kildare with his elder brother Frank and Christy Moore. They played mostly in pubs and were also booked for a couple of gigs, one at Hugh Neeson's pub in Newbridge for Easter Monday 1966.

In 1965, Lunny enrolled at Dublin's National College of Art & Design where he studied Basic Design and Graphic Design. He also developed an interest in metalwork leading him to become a skilled gold- and silversmith, although he only practised the craft for a short time before devoting his energies fully to music. During his time in Dublin, he played in a band called The Parnell Folk, with Mick Moloney, Sean Corcoran, Johnny Morrissey and Dan Maher.

== Performing career ==
=== Emmet Spiceland ===
Later he formed the group Emmet Folk, which also included Mick Moloney and Brian Bolger, and they started a club at 95 Harcourt Street called The 95 Club. "At that time, we'd reached the stage where we had our own repertoire and ... developing [our] own identity rather than just singing everybody's songs. We were taken quite seriously."

Eventually, Lunny and Bolger joined forces with brothers Brian and Mick Byrne from Spiceland Folk to form Emmet Spiceland, which continued as a trio after Bolger resigned. Their debut album, The First, was released in 1968. As a vocal harmony group, they had a number 1 hit in Ireland with the single Mary from Dungloe, which had earlier been popularised in Dublin's folk clubs by Lunny and his Emmet Folk group partner Mick Moloney.

=== Duo with Andy Irvine ===
The place was always packed, and the atmosphere was amazing. I think one of the reasons it all felt so exciting was that you couldn't but be aware that they really were breaking new ground, even before Planxty formed. Something very powerful was germinating. The intricacy and the rhythmic complexity of their arrangements were something really fresh and unheard of – they were literally blowing the dust and cobwebs off some of that material and giving it this sparkling, dancing new life. It was exhilarating to witness – no other word.

— Clodagh Simonds, The Humours of Planxty by Leagues O'Toole.

In 1970, Lunny formed a musical partnership with Andy Irvine—who had returned from his travels in Eastern Europe—after an initial gig at a party for the Irish-Soviet Union Friendship conference organised by Seán Mac Réamoinn. They created their own club night downstairs at Slattery's pub in Capel Street, Dublin, which they called 'The Mug's Gig'. This featured Irvine and Lunny, and guest performers such as Ronnie Drew, Mellow Candle and the group Supply, Demand & Curve.

=== Planxty ===
In 1971, Lunny and Irvine, plus Liam O'Flynn, played on Moore's second album, Prosperous, which led them to form Planxty. Their first professional performance took place in Slattery's in early 1972. The band became a leading proponent of Irish traditional instrumental music.

=== Celtic Folkweave ===
In 1974, Lunny produced and performed on the album Celtic Folkweave by Mick Hanly and Mícheál Ó Domhnaill, who had been supporting Planxty on tour. Hanly, Ó Domhnaill, and Lunny were supported in the studio by O'Flynn on uilleann pipes and whistle, Matt Molloy on flute, Tommy Peoples on fiddle, and Tríona Ní Dhomhnaill on harpsichord. These were players who would join Lunny in forming The Bothy Band.

=== The Bothy Band ===
Lunny left Planxty to form The Bothy Band in 1974, playing guitar and bouzouki. The Bothy Band quickly became one of the prominent bands performing Irish traditional music. Their enthusiasm and musical virtuosity had a significant influence on the Irish traditional music movement that continued well after they disbanded in 1979.

=== Moving Hearts ===
After the Bothy Band disbanded, Lunny became a session musician on various projects, including Davey and Morris, the first album to feature Shaun Davey. In 1981, Lunny reunited with Moore to form Moving Hearts, along with a young uilleann piper, Davy Spillane. Following the example of the group Horslips, Moving Hearts combined Irish traditional music with rock and roll, and also added elements of jazz to their sound. The group disbanded in 1985. In February 2007, Moving Hearts reunited for a concert in Dublin. In 2008 and 2009, the group performed again in several concerts in Ireland and the United States.

=== Coolfin ===
In 1987, Lunny recorded a solo album titled Dónal Lunny (Gael-Linn 1987), which included many guest musicians playing his music and arrangements. In 1998, he produced a similar group project album titled Coolfin.

=== Mozaik ===
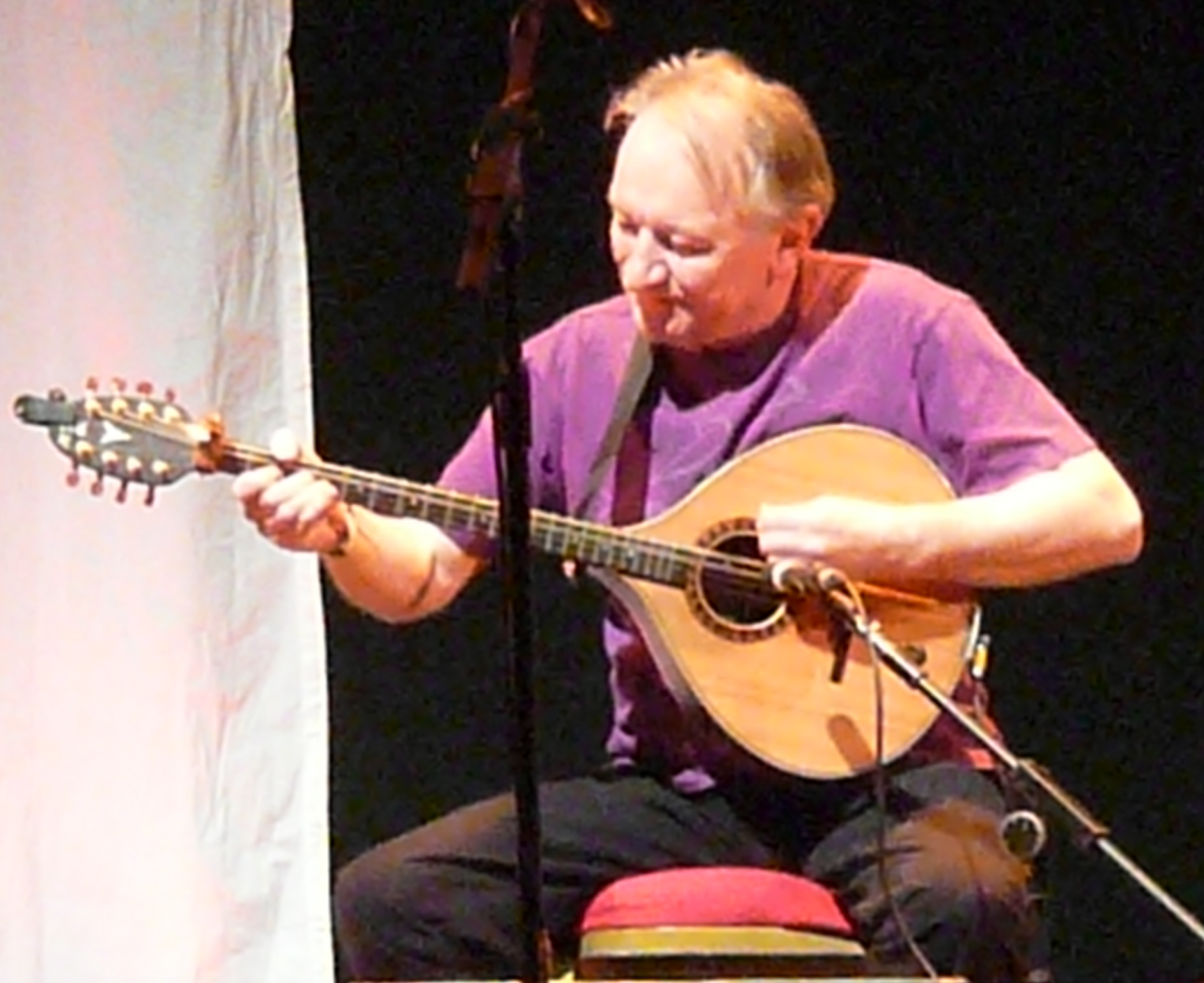
Lunny playing the bouzouki, 2012

From 2002 onwards, Lunny and Andy Irvine founded a multicultural band called Mozaik, with Bruce Molsky, Nikola Parov and Rens van der Zalm. Mozaik have performed worldwide and recorded two albums to date.

=== LAPD ===
On 20 January 2012, Lunny appeared on stage with LAPD, the latest grouping of players from Planxty; the moniker 'LAPD' is made up from the first name initials of Liam O'Flynn, Andy Irvine, Paddy Glackin and Dónal Lunny. After a series of occasional concerts, LAPD disbanded, their last gig taking place on Saturday 26 October 2013.

=== Usher's Island ===
On 27 January 2015, Lunny's latest musical association performed at Celtic Connections 2015 in Glasgow. Called Usher's Island (a reference to the Dublin quay where James Joyce's story "The Dead" is set), it morphed from LAPD and comprised Lunny, Irvine and Glackin, plus Michael McGoldrick (uilleann pipes, flute and whistle) and John Doyle (guitar).

=== Trio with Zoë Conway & Máirtín O'Connor ===
Lunny contributed to contemporary music in Ireland: as well as touring with many musicians (including Andy Irvine, Paddy Glackin, Michael McGoldrick, Paul Brady and Kevin Burke). In September 2016 he formed a trio with Zoë Conway and Máirtín O'Connor. One of his last performances before his death was with this trio at the Electric Picnic festival in August 2026.

== Production career ==
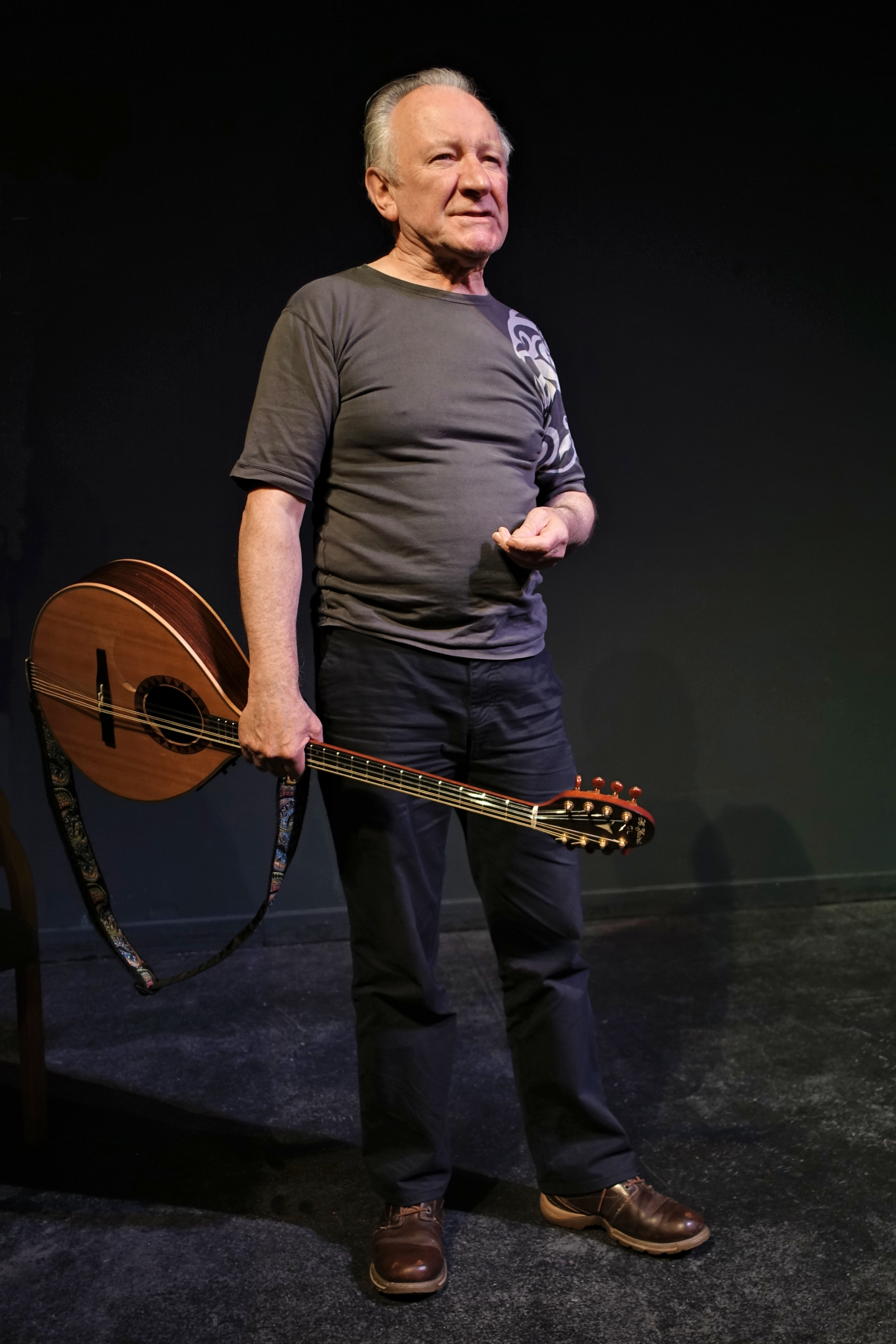
Dónal Lunny at the Craiceann Bodhrán Festival 2016, Inis Oirr

When Moving Hearts broke up in 1985, Lunny diversified and became a producer. He had already produced Clannad's second album, a 45 rpm single for Skid Row (featuring 17-year-old Gary Moore) and, in 1974, the album A Silk Purse for electric folk band Spud, managed by Paul McGuinness.

Lunny was closely involved in the establishment of a new Irish record label, Mulligan Records and produced and played on many of its early releases. In 2008 Compass Records acquired Mulligan's catalogue and began releasing records on their behalf.

He played on several Christy Moore albums and was a producer and session musician on Kate Bush albums. He played bouzouki and bodhrán on Shaun Davey's Granuaile, and fiddle on Midnight Well's Saw you Running. He composed the soundtracks for the Turkish film, Teardrops, and the Irish film Eat the Peach. He also played on the soundtracks of the film This Is My Father and the TV programme The River of Sound. In 1989 he contributed synthesizer on Mary Black's breakthrough album No Frontiers.

He was the producer and music director of the soundtrack of Bringing It All Back Home, a BBC television documentary series charting the influence of Irish music throughout the world. He played on, arranged and/or produced albums for Spud, Kate Bush, Mary Black, Elvis Costello, Indigo Girls, Sinéad O’Connor, Clannad, Paul Brady, Baaba Maal, The Waterboys, Fairground Attraction, Eddi Reader, Mark Knopfler, Eivør Pálsdóttir and Jimmy MacCarthy. He played on compilation albums The Gathering (1981) and Common Ground (1996). In 1994 he produced Irish Australian singer/songwriter Maireid Sullivan's first recording, Dancer.

Lunny pushed new boundaries with his band Coolfin (1998) and the Donal Lunny Band which included the work of uilleann piper John McSherry. In 2001 Lunny collaborated with Frank Harte on the album My Name is Napoleon Bonaparte. He produced the album Human Child (2007) by Faeroese Eivør Pálsdóttir, which was published in two versions, one English and one Faeroese.

He also produced Jimmy MacCarthy's album entitled Hey-Ho Believe, which was released on 12 November 2010.

== Influence ==
Dónal Lunny could claim popularising the bouzouki in the Irish music sphere after being given an instrument by Andy Irvine, who was himself introduced to the instrument by Johnny Moynihan in the early days of Sweeney's Men. Lunny ordered a custom-built bouzouki from English luthier Peter Abnett, with a flat back instead of a traditional Greek rounded back.

He also invented an acoustic drum kit designed to fill the need for a bass/percussion instrument in Irish traditional music. The process of building and developing the instrument was featured on his 2010–2011 RTÉ series Lorg Lunny.

== Personal life and death ==
Lunny was the brother of musician and producer Manus Lunny. His son Oisín Lunny was part of the hip-hop group Marxman and his daughter Cora Venus Lunny is a violin player, composer, singer and actor. His granddaughter Phoebe Lunny is the lead vocalist and guitarist for punk rock group Lambrini Girls. He had a son, Shane, with singer-songwriter Sinéad O'Connor; Lunny’s son Shane died by suicide at the age of 17 on 7 January 2022.

Lunny died in Dublin from pneumonia related to lung cancer, according to his son Oisín, on 23 October 2026, at the age of 79.

== Discography ==
=== Solo albums ===
- Dónal Lunny (1987), Gael-Linn, CEFCD133
- Coolfin (1998)
- Journey: The Best of Dónal Lunny (2001)

=== With Christy Moore ===
- Prosperous (1972)
- Christy Moore (1976)
- Whatever Tickles Your Fancy (1976)
- Live in Dublin (1978)
- AntiNuclear (1979), on "People Will Die" and "Trip to Carnsore"
- H-Block (1980)
- Christy Moore and Friends (1981)
- The Time Has Come (1983)
- Ride On (1984)
- The Spirit of Freedom (1985)
- Ordinary Man (1985)
- Unfinished Revolution (1987)
- Voyage (1989)

=== With Planxty ===
- Planxty (album) (1973)
- The Well Below the Valley (1973)
- Cold Blow and the Rainy Night (1974)
- After The Break (1979, 1992)
- The Woman I Loved So Well (1980, 1992)
- "Timedance" (1981), 12-inch single
- Words & Music (1983)
- Arís! (1984)
- Live 2004 CD/DVD (2004)
- Between the Jigs and the Reels: A Retrospective CD/DVD (2016)

=== With Andy Irvine and Paul Brady ===
- Andy Irvine/Paul Brady (1976)
- Welcome Here Kind Stranger (1978)
- Andy Irvine/70th Birthday Concert at Vicar St 2012 (2014)

=== With Mozaik ===
- Live from the Powerhouse (2004)
- Changing Trains (2007)
- The Long And The Short Of It (2019)

=== With Usher's Island ===
- Usher's Island (2017)

=== With the Bothy Band ===
- 1975 (1975)
- Old Hag You Have Killed Me (1976)
- Out of the Wind, Into the Sun (1977, 1985)
- Afterhours (Live in Paris) (1978, 1984)
- Live in Concert (1994)

=== With Moving Hearts ===
- Moving Hearts (1982)
- Dark End of the Street (1982)
- Live Hearts (1984)
- The Storm (1985)
- Live in Dublin (2008)

=== With other artists ===
- Live at the Embankment by James Keane
- Celtic Folkweave by Mick Hanly and Mícheál Ó Domhnaill (1974)
- Matt Molloy with Donal Lunny by Matt Molloy (1976) (Green Linnet, GLCD3008)
- Patrick Street by Patrick Street (1986) (Green Linnet, GLCD1071)
- Altan by Frankie Kennedy and Mairéad Ní Mhaonaigh (1987) (Green Linnet, GLCD 1078)
- The Rough Guide to Irish Music (1996)
- Idir an Dá Sholas by Maighread & Tríona Ní Dhomhnaill (1999)
- Marginal Moon by Soul Flower Union (1999) (Japanese release)
- Hey-Ho Believe by Jimmy MacCarthy

=== Guest appearances ===
- Midnight Well by Midnight Well (1976), Mulligan
- "Night of the Swallow" by Kate Bush (1981)
- No Frontiers by Mary Black (1989), Dara
- Golden Heart by Mark Knopfler (1996)
- Sean-Nós Nua by Sinéad O'Connor (2002), Hummingbird Records
- Tráthnona Beag Areir by Albert Fry (2008), Gael Linn
- Imeall by Mairéad Ní Mhaonaigh (2008), Moon
- Ceol Cheann Dubhrann by various artists (2009)

== Filmography ==
References:

- Sult le Dónal Lunny (two seasons: 1996 and 1997), Hummingbird Productions for Teilifís na Gaeilge
- Planxty Live 2004 (2004), DVD
- The Transatlantic Sessions Series 3 (2007), DVD
- Moving Hearts Live in Dublin (2008), DVD
- Andy Irvine 70th Birthday Concert at Vicar St 2012 (2014), DVD
- Mozaik on Tour 2014 (2014), YouTube video
