= Mary from Dungloe (song) =

Irish song

"Mary from Dungloe" is an Irish song originally penned by a County Donegal stonemason Pádraig Mac Cumhaill in 1936, telling a tragic story of love and heartbreak. A modified version of the song was re-released by The Emmet Spiceland Ballad Group and reached number 1 in the Irish singles music chart on 24 February 1968. This success prompted the creation of the Mary From Dungloe International Festival, an Irish music festival held in Dungloe, in northwest Ireland. There exists two versions of the song, the original long version by Pádraig MacCumhaill and a shorter version by Colm O'Laughlin, the latter version is the most popular today.

== Story of the song ==
"Mary From Dungloe" (1988)
Daniel O'Donnell's version of "Mary from Dungloe".

The original 'Mary' in question is said to be a Mary Gallagher, a native of Dungloe, she was courted by a man (from the Gweedore area) who had just returned from the United States but her parents refused to let them marry and he left to return to the US. On 13 July 1876 she emigrated to New Zealand to join her relatives there. On the boat she met Daniel Egan and they were married in New Zealand on 30 September 1877. She gave birth to a baby but died shortly after (15 December 1878) aged 19. The baby named Owen died at six months.

== Lyrics ==
=== Original Pádraig MacCumhaill Lyrics ===
Oh, then fare ye well, sweet Donegal, the Rosses and Gweedore.
I'm crossing the main ocean, where the foaming billows roar,
it breaks my heart from you to part, where I spent many happy days.
Farewell to kind relations for I'm bound for Amerikay.

Ah, then Mary, you're my heart's delight, my pride and only care,
it was your cruel father would not let me stay there.
But absence makes the heart grow fond and when I'm o'er the main,
may the Lord protect my darling girl till I return again.

And I wished I was in sweet Dungloe and seated on the grass.
And by my side a bottle of wine and on my knee a lass.
I'd call for liquor of the best and I'd pay before I go
and I'd roll my Mary in my arms in the town of sweet Dungloe.

O me maid is tall and beautiful and her age is scarce eighteen
She far exceeds all other fair maid as she trips o'er the green
Her lovely neck and shoulders are fairer than the snow
Til the day I die, I'll ne'r deny O me Mary from Dungloe.

=== Colm Ó Lochlainn Lyrics ===
Oh then fare thee well sweet Donegal, the Rosses and Gweedore,
I'm crossing the main ocean
where the foaming billows roar,
It breaks my heart from you to part where I spent many happy days.
Farewell to kind relations, I am bound for Amerikay.

Oh then Mary you're my heart's delight, my pride and only care,
It was your cruel father
would not let me to stay here,
But absence makes the heart grow fond, and when I am over the main,
May the Lord protect my darling girl, 'till I return again.

And I wish I was in sweet Dungloe
and seated on the grass,
And by my side a bottle of wine,
and on my knee a lass,
I'd call for liquor of the best,
and I'd pay before I'd go,
And I'd roll my Mary in my arms,
in the town of sweet Dungloe.

=== James Gallagher Lyrics ===
Oh then fare thee well sweet Donegal, the Rosses and Gweedore,
I'm crossing back main ocean
where the stormy billows grow,
And it breaks my heart from you to part where I spent many happy days.
Farewell to kind relations, I am bound for Amerikay.

Oh now Mary you're my heart's delight, your my pride, my only care,
And it was your cruel father
That would not let me stray there,
But absence makes the heart grow fond, and when I'm over the main,
May the Lord protect my darling girl, until I return again.

Oh I wish I was in sweet Dungloe
and seated on the ground,
And by my side a bottle of wine,
and on my knee a lass,
I'd call for liquor of the best,
I'd pay before I would go,
And I'd roll my Mary in my arms,
in the town of sweet Dungloe.

== Covers ==
The song has become a traditional Irish staple and it has been covered by an array of artists, most notably by Emmet Spiceland, Daniel O'Donnell, Show of Hands, The Irish Tenors, Phil Coulter, Paddy Reilly, Christy Moore, Tommy Fleming, Foster & Allen, The Johnstons, James Gallagher, Screaming Orphans, and Patrick Clifford.

== See also ==
- List of Irish ballads
