= Davy Spillane =

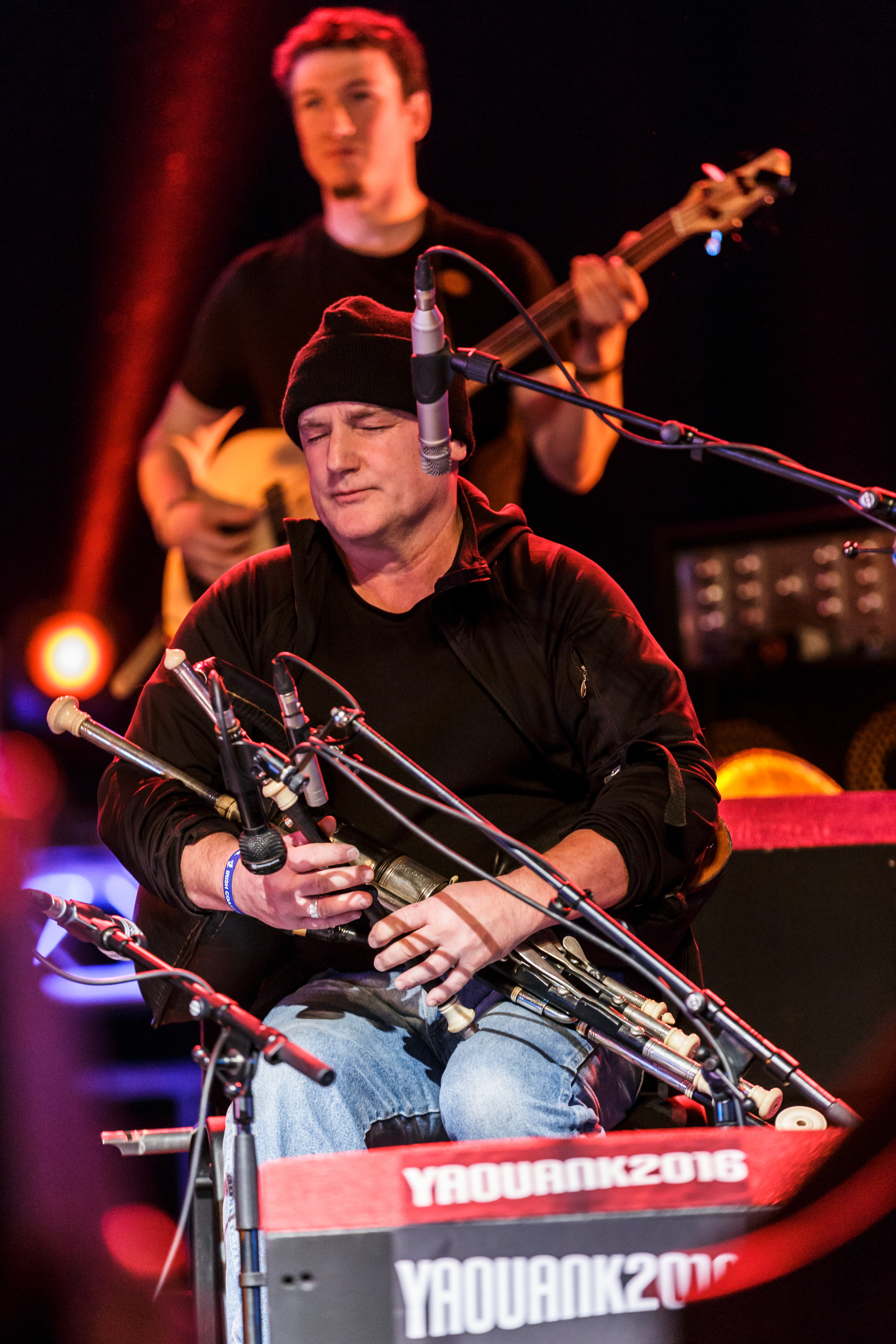
- Davy Spillane at Festival Yaouank in 2016

Background information
- Born: 1959 (age 66–67); Dublin, Ireland
- Genres: Celtic rock Folk rock Rock
- Occupations: Musician, composer
- Instruments: Uilleann pipes, low whistle
- Years active: 1970 – present
- Label: Burrenstone music
- Member of: Moving Hearts
- Website: Official Website

Davy Spillane (born 1959 in Dublin, Ireland) is an Irish musician, songwriter and a player of uilleann pipes and low whistle.

== Biography ==
=== Irish music ===
At the age of 12, Spillane started playing the uilleann pipes. His father encouraged him and inspired him with his love of all music genres. For the next three years he played at sessions and met many prominent Irish musicians. At the age of 16, he played in Ireland, the United Kingdom and Europe. In 1978, he began to write his own music. He starred as a gypsy in Joe Comerford's 1981 film Traveller.

=== Moving Hearts and solo albums ===
He is a founding member of Moving Hearts, along with Christy Moore and Donal Lunny in 1981. Although each member had a strong pedigree of Irish folk music, the band played mostly original compositions, sometimes with a political edge and a folk-rock sound. Their final album The Storm (1985) was purely instrumental and had several slower pieces written by Spillane. He then made the surprise move of joining up with American musician Béla Fleck, the Englishman Albert Lee, Jerry Douglas, and others to record a Davy Spillane debut album of his new compositions and bluegrass and original blues, Atlantic Bridge. There was a promotional touring band which also recorded Out of the Air in 1988, essentially a live version of Atlantic Bridge. Spillane then gathered together a new set of musicians, including Rory Gallagher and Kevin Glackin to record Shadow Hunter, an album of various rock and folk styles. This was followed by Pipedreams in 1991.

=== Collaborations ===
Spillane played as special guest soloist in orchestral work in 1992 called "The Seville Suite", describing events in 1601 in Irish-Spanish history. Bill Whelan then worked for Spillane and Andy Irvine on the album, EastWind. In 1993, Spillane collaborated with Canadian musicians such as Bryan Adams, and Daniel Weaver on his album Weeds plus Celine Dion's My Heart Will go On. In 1994, Spillane was a special guest soloist in Riverdance. Spillane also collaborated with Rory Gallagher on the tracks "The Road to Ballyalla", "Litton Lane" and "One For Phil" as well as with Enya on her 1988 Watermark tracks "Exile" and "Na Laetha Geal M'Óige".

=== Film music ===
In 1992, Spillane composed music for Peter Kosminsky's film Emily Brontë's Wuthering Heights and, in 1995, reached a larger audience with the film Rob Roy. Other compositions and guesting includes Kate Bush's Sensual World (1989), Mike Oldfield's Voyager (1996), Bryan Adams' MTV Unplugged, Van Morrison and Elvis Costello. Other films include Eat the Peach and The Disappearance of Finbar. Paul Winter's album Journey with the Sun (2002). Spillane earned a Grammy Award and also nominated for second one.

Spillane served his apprenticeship with pipe-makers Dan Dowd and Johnny Burke and now makes all his own instruments. In 2000, he recorded his only album of traditional tunes with Kevin Glackin, entitled Forgotten Days.

== Discography ==
=== Moving Hearts ===
- Moving Hearts (1981)
- Dark End of the Street (1982)
- The Storm (1985)
- Live Hearts (1986) (recorded 1983)
- Live in Dublin (2008)

=== Solo albums ===
- Atlantic Bridge (1987)
- Out of the Air (1988)
- Shadow Hunter (1990)
- Pipedreams (1991)
- A Place Among The Stones (1994) (Note: The title track, "A Place Among The Stones", is featured on solo albums by both Moya Brennan and Davy Spillane. The song is most commonly credited Máire Brennan featuring Davy Spillane and appears on Moya (Máire) Brennan's Misty Eyed Adventures album. The only difference between the two tracks is that Spillane's has an extra second of silence.)
- The Sea of Dreams (1998)
- Deep Blue Sea (2004)
- Between Longing & Belonging (2016)

=== Collaborations ===
- EastWind (1992) – with Andy Irvine
- Calman The Dove (1998) – with Savourna Stevenson
- Forgotten Days (2001) – with Kevin Glackin

=== Contributions ===
- The Piper's Rock - A Compilation of Young Pipers, Various Artists (?) - Uilleann pipes
- The Heritage Tapes: Songs and Stories from Old Tiger Bay, Various Artists (?)
- Irish Festival, Various Artists (1980) - Uilleann pipes on The Old Bush/Rakish Paddy
- My Very Favourite Nursery Rhyme Record, Tim Hart (1981) - Uilleann pipes
- The Drunken Sailor and other Kids Favorites, Tim Hart (1983) - Uilleann pipes
- Inarticulate Speech of the Heart, Van Morrison (1983) - Uilleann pipes & Low Whistle
- Getting to the Border, Alistair Russell (1984) - Uilleann pipes & Low Whistle
- Now and Then, The Sands Family (1986) - Low Whistle on When the Music Starts to Play
- Classic Irish Ballads, Diarmuid O'Leary & The Bards (1986) - Uilleann pipes & Low Whistle
- Dancing with Strangers, Chris Rea (1987) - Uilleann pipes, Low Whistle & Guitar
- Under the Influence, Mary Coughlan (1987) - Uilleann pipes
- Goreuon, Best of (Featuring Donal Lunny/Davy Spillane), Jim O'Rourke, Uilleann pipes & Low Whistle
- Watermark, Enya (1988) - Uilleann pipes & Low Whistle
- North and South, Gerry Rafferty (1988) - Uilleann pipes & Low Whistle
- Dublin Millenium Song (Single), Various Artists (1988) - Uilleann pipes
- We've Come A Long Way, Liam Clancy/Tommy Makem (1989) - Uilleann pipes & Low Whistle
- The Sensual World, Kate Bush (1989) - Uilleann pipes & Low Whistle
- All I Remember, Mick Hanly (1989) - Uilleann pipes & Low Whistle
- Ogam, Ogam (1989) - Fearless composed by Davy Spillane
- Winds of Change, Oisin - Geraldine MacGowan & Anne Conroy (1989) - Uilleann pipes & Low Whistle
- Spike, Elvis Costello (1989) - Uilleann pipes & Low Whistle
- Elio samaga hukapan kariyana turu, Elio E Le Storie Tese (1989) - Uilleann pipes
- Brand New Dance, Emmylou Harris (1990) - Uilleann pipes
- This Rhythm, T. T. Oksala (1990) - Uilleann pipes
- Hopes and Bodies, The Senators (1990) - Uilleann pipes
- The Sweet Keeper, Tanita Tikaram (1990) - Low Whistle on It All Came Back Today
- Sojourner's Song, Buddy Greene (1990) - Uilleann pipes & Low Whistle
- Vigil in a Wilderness of Mirrors, Fish (1990) - Uilleann pipes & Low Whistle on Vigil
- Put 'Em Under Pressure (single), Republic of Ireland Football Squad (1990)
- Two Rooms: Celebrating the Songs of Elton John & Bernie Taupin (1991) - Uilleann pipes on Kate Bush, Rocket Man
- Mighty Like a Rose, Elvis Costello (1991) - Uilleann pipes
- Mission Street, Kieran Halpin (1991) - Uilleann pipes & Low Whistle
- Rude Awakening, Andy Irvine (1991)
- Smoke and Strong Whiskey, Christy Moore (1991) - Low Whistle
- The Ways of the World, Mary Custy & Eoin O'Neill (1991) - Uilleann pipes
- Lam Toro, Baaba Maal (1992) - Uilleann pipes
- High on the Happy Side, Wet Wet Wet (1992) - Low Whistle on Put The Light On
- Soul Inspiration, Simon Climie (1992) - Low Whistle
- Rita Connolly, Rita Connolly (1992) - Low Whistle
- Something Special In The Air (Single) for Impact 92, Derry City Council (1992) - Uilleann pipes & Low Whistle
- Sentimental Killer, Mary Coughlan (1992) - Uilleann pipes
- Endless Emotion, Johnny Logan (1992) - Uilleann pipes
- Harmony, Londonbeat (1992) - Low Whistle on Harmony and The Sea of Tranquility
- Bajo El Signo de Cain, Miguel Bose (1993) - Uilleann pipes & Low Whistle
- Again, Alan Stivell (1993) - Uilleann pipes
- Before & After, Tim Finn (1993) - Uilleann pipes on Many's The Time
- Solid Ground, Dolores Keane (1993) - Uilleann pipes
- Espresso Logic, Chris Rea (1993) - Uilleann pipes
- Far from Home, Traffic (1994) - Uilleann pipes on Holy Ground
- Traditional Music In Support Of Doolin Coast And Cliff Rescue Service, Various Artists (1994) - Uilleann pipes
- 33 Revolutions Per Minute, Marxman (1994) - Whistles
- Daniel Weaver, Daniel Weaver (1994) - Uilleann pipes & Low Whistle
- Cumplicidodes, Luis Represas (1994) - Uilleann pipes & Low Whistle
- The Sound of Stone - Artists for Mullaghmore, Various Artists (1994) - Low Whistle
- Celtic Themes, Various Artists (1994) - Uilleann pipes
- A River Of Sound: The Changing Course Of Irish Music, BBC/RTE programme (1995) - Uilleann pipes & Low Whistle
- Seville Suite, Bill Whelan (1995) - Uilleann pipes & Low Whistle
- Folk Music Ensemble, Dan Foyle (1995) - Uilleann pipes & Low Whistle
- Cry of a Dreamer, Sean Tyrell (1995) - Uilleann pipes & Low Whistle
- Little Bruises, Gary Kemp (1995) - Uilleann pipes & Low Whistle
- Misty Eyed Adventures, Moya Brennan (1995) - Low Whistle see above
- Transatlantic Sessions - Series 1, Various Artists (1995) - Uilleann pipes & Low Whistle
- Arabesque, Mike Batt (1995) - Uilleann pipes & Low Whistle
- Riverdance: Music from the Show, Bill Whelan (1995) - Uilleann pipes & Low Whistle
- Songs From A Secret Garden, Secret Garden (1996) - Uilleann pipes & Low Whistle
- Volume 1: Sound Magic, Afro Celt Sound System (1996) - Uilleann pipes & Low Whistle
- Voyager, Mike Oldfield (1996) - Uilleann pipes & Low Whistle
- Hammer, Zoe (1996) -Uilleann pipes on The Lion Roars
- Ao Vivo No CCB, Luis Represas (1996) - Uilleann pipes & Low Whistle
- Common Ground, Various Artists (1996) - Low Whistle on Whistling Low/Errigal, Mary of the South Seas & On Raglan Road
- White Stones, Secret Garden (1997) - Uilleann pipes
- Kilim, Nikola Parov (1997) - Uilleann pipes
- What Did He Say?, Victor Wooten (1997) - Uilleann pipes
- Illumination, Richard Souther, Hildegard von Bingen (1997) - Uilleann pipes & Low Whistle
- Gospel Oak, Sinead O'Connor (1997) - Low & High Whistle
- Amara, Island Currents, Joe Boske (1997) - Low Whistle on The Delphi Air
- Laberinto Volume 2, Miguel Bose (1997) - Uilleann pipes & Low Whistle
- Ar Galon Digorr (single), Annie Ebrel (1997) on Fest Vraz Musique Bretonnes - Uilleann pipes & Low Whistle
- Unplugged, Bryan Adams (1997) - Uilleann pipes & Low Whistle
- Sun and the Moon and the Stars, Spirit of Eden (1998) - Uilleann pipes
- The Peace Within, BMC Band (1998) - Uilleann pipes & Low Whistle
- Wandering Home, David Lynch (1998) - Uilleann pipes & Low Whistle
- Piece of Cake, Lubos Malina (1999) - Uilleann pipes & Low Whistle
- Celtic Solstice, Paul Winter (1999) - Uilleann pipes & Low Whistle
- New Freedom Bell, Druka Trava (1999) - Low Whistle
- The Orchard, Sean Tyrell (1999) - Uilleann pipes & Low Whistle (Album recorded at Burrenstone Studios)
- Streams, Various Artists (1999) - Uilleann pipes & Low Whistle
- Live at Slane Castle (DVD), Bryan Adams (2000) - Low Whistle
- Journey with the Sun, Paul Winter (2000) - Uilleann pipes & Low Whistle
- Irvi, Denez Prigent (2000) - Uilleann pipes
- Behind the Mist: Music from Conamaras' Bog and Sea Weeks (2000) - Uilleann pipes & Low Whistle
- Dreamcatcher, Secret Garden (2001) - Uilleann pipes & Low Whistle
- Adiemus Vol 4, Karl Jenkins (2001) - Uilleann pipes on The Eternal Knot
- Girls Won't Leave the Boys Alone, Cherish the Ladies (2001) - Uilleann pipes
- The Best Of Mary Black 1991-2001, Mary Black (2001) - Uilleann pipes
- Unearthed, Posthumus (2001) - Uilleann pipes & Low Whistle
- 12 Vox - The Way To be Ourselves, Taro Iwashiro (2001) - Uilleann pipes & Low Whistle
- Ceol Tacsi, Various Artists (2003) - Uilleann pipes & Low Whistle on Muladach Is Mi Air M'aineol with Karen Matheson
- Spiorad, The Lismorahaun Singers (2003) - Uilleann pipes
- The River Returning, Johnny Duhan (2003) - Uilleann pipes & Low Whistle
- Sexual Healing (single B-side), Kate Bush (2005) - Uilleann pipes
- Grief Never Grows Old - (single), One World Project (2005) - Uilleann pipes & Low Whistle
- Silver Solstice, Paul Winter Consort & Friends (2005) - Uilleann pipes
- Human Child/Mannabarn - Eivor (2007) - Uilleann pipes & Low Whistle
- To The Moon, Capercaillie (2008) Tracks from Rob Roy - Uilleann pipes & Low Whistle
- Art of Chill 5, Bent (2008) - Uilleann pipes on Pipegroove
- Distant Shore, Orla Fallon (2009) - Low Whistle
- This Is What I Live For, Richard Anthony Jay (2009) - Uilleann pipes & Low Whistle on Gone But Not Forgotten
- A Different Hat, Paul Carrack (2010) - Uilleann pipes & Low Whistle
- Dream of You, Sharon Corr (2010) - Low Whistle on Cooley's Reel
- Director's Cut, Kate Bush (2011) - Uilleann pipes & Low Whistle on Flower of the Mountain
- Lament, Various Artists (2012) - Low Whistle on Lament For the Dead of the North
- The Peacemakers, Karl Jenkins (2012) - Uilleann pipes
- Transparent Music 2, B. J. Cole (2012) - Low Whistle
- Papitwo, Miguel Bose (2012) - Uilleann pipes & Low Whistle
- Goodbye (single), Mary Jane Riemann (2013) - Uilleann pipes
- Man on the Rocks, Mike Oldfield (2014) - Low Whistle on Moonshine
- Whisky Lullabies/Suantraí Meisciúil - (single), Janet Devlin (2015) - Low Whistle on Suantraí Meisciúil
- Drowning (single), Simone Kaye (date unknown) - Uilleann pipes & Low Whistle
- Creation, Johnny Duhan (2016) - Low Whistle on The Three Temptations.
- Source, Afro Celt Sound System (2016) - Uilleann pipes & Low Whistle
- The Ashgrove Sessions, Ashgrove (2016) - Uilleann pipes & Low Whistle
- Confessional, Janet Devlin (2020) - Low Whistle
- A Long Time Coming, Bocle Brothers (2024) - Uilleann pipes

=== Soundtracks ===
- Lamb (1985)
- Eat the Peach (1986)
- Reefer and the Model (1988)
- The Ballad of the Sad Café (1991) – Low Whistle
- Wuthering Heights (1992)
- Rob Roy (1995) – Uilleann pipes & Low Whistle
- Michael Collins (1996) – Uilleann pipes & Low Whistle
- The Disappearance of Finbar (1996)
- Xenogears (with Yasunori Mitsuda) (1998) – Low Whistle
- Creid (with Yasunori Mitsuda) (1998) – Uilleann pipes & Low Whistle
- Dancing at Lughnasa (1998) – Uilleann pipes & Low Whistle
- Excalibur, La légende des Celtes, Various Artists (1999)
- Aoi ~ Tokugawa Sandai, Taro Iwashiro (2000) - Uilleann pipes & Low Whistle
- Xenosaga (2002) – Uilleann pipes & Low Whistle
- Gangs of New York (2002) - Uilleann pipes & Low Whistle
- Graal, Catherine Lara (2005) - Uilleann pipes & Low Whistle
