= Keith Donald =

Canadian rower

Personal information
- Nationality: Canadian
- Born: 23 September 1940 (age 84); Vancouver, British Columbia, Canada

Sport
- Sport: Rowing

Keith Donald (born 23 September 1940) is a Canadian rower. He competed in the men's coxless pair event at the 1960 Summer Olympics.
