= Fishguard Folk Festival =

Music festival in Pembrokeshire, Wales

Since 1999, the seaport town of Fishguard in Wales has hosted a traditional music festival, held over the late May Spring Bank Holiday weekend.

A feature of the festival is the blur between audience and performers, creating an opportunity to meet the artists, engage in the workshops and master-classes, and soak up the atmosphere.

International interest in Celtic roots has seen the festival introduce, and attract, Breton, Cornish and Scottish artists alongside the now regular Welsh, Irish and English groups.

Organised by volunteers from the Tuesday night Fishguard Folk session, the festival is non-profit making, financed mainly by grants, ticket sales and donations.
