= Low whistle =

Music instrument

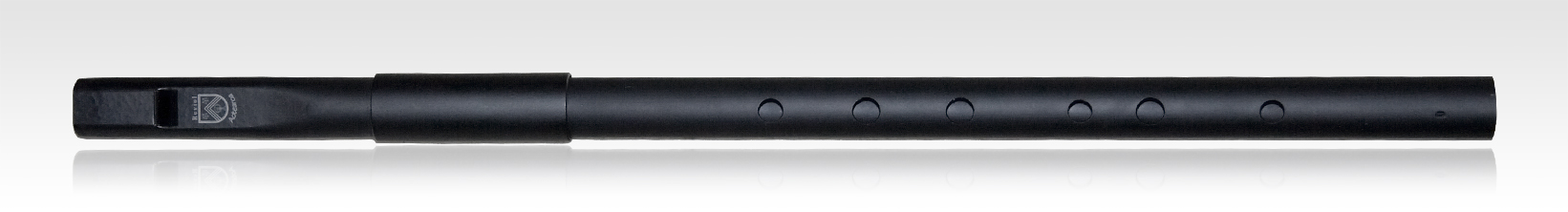
- Other names: Concert Whistle, Alto/Tenor/Bass Whistle
- Classification: Woodwind; Wind; Aerophone

Playing range
- Two octaves, typically D_{4} to D_{6}

Related instruments
- Simple-system flute; Pipe and tabor; The sound of the low whistle in D

The low whistle, or concert whistle, is a variation of the traditional tin whistle/pennywhistle, distinguished by its lower pitch and larger size. It is most closely associated with the performances of British and Irish artists such as Tommy Makem, Finbar Furey and his son Martin Furey, Old Blind Dogs, Michael McGoldrick, Riverdance, Lunasa, Donie Keyes, Chris Conway, and Davy Spillane, and is increasingly accepted as a feature of Celtic music.

The low whistle is often used for the playing of airs and slow melodies due to its softer and more mellow tone compared to the high whistles, as well as being quieter. However, it is also becoming used more often for the playing of jigs, reels and hornpipes from the Irish, Scottish, Manx, Welsh, and English traditions. A reason put forward for this being, it's easier to produce some ornamentation on the whistle, due to the size of the finger holes.

The most common low whistle is the "Low D", pitched one octave below the traditional D whistle. A whistle is generally classed as a low whistle if its lowest note is the G above middle C or lower. Whistles higher than this are termed "soprano" or "high" whistles when a distinction is necessary. Low whistles operate on the same principles, and are generally fingered in the same way as traditional pennywhistles although for many, a "piper's grip" may be required due to the distance between the holes. They belong to the same woodwind instrument family of end-blown fipple flutes.

Though the tone of this instrument varies subtly among makers, low whistles are generally characterized by a more breathy, flute-like sound than traditional tin whistles.

== Early history ==
While the precise history of the low whistle is often debated, it is known that various kinds of vertical fipple flutes have existed in antiquity. The fipple flutes developed during the 16th century were the ancestors of today's low whistle, carrying through from early transverse flutes the six-holed design tradition and conical bore shape. They were originally of wooden construction, but the late 17th century saw more extensive use of metals such as brass and nickel. The metal was usually rolled and soldered, and further developments included the use of a tuning slide. These metal vertical flutes were found throughout Ireland, Britain, the Scandinavian peninsula, Canada, and Flanders.

== The modern low whistle ==
English flute maker and jazz musician Bernard Overton (1930–2008) is credited with producing the first modern low whistle in late 1971, which he made with Finbar Furey after Furey's prized Indian bamboo whistle was destroyed while on tour. Unable to repair it, Overton attempted to produce a metal replica and Finbar and himself spent many hours in the shed at the back of Bernard's house in Rugby, designing, testing and ultimately perfecting the flute. The first few were named the Furey/Overton flute but when Bernard gave up his job to hand make them full-time, they decided to market them as The Overton Flute. The first resulting instrument was essentially an oversized tin whistle made of copper pipe with a wooden plug but was quickly replaced by the aluminium one. While Overton was unsatisfied with its performance, he subsequently refined the design with an all-aluminium construction, producing a whistle in A. Impressed, Finbar requested a G version for his trademark Lonesome Boatman performances. Later, according to Overton,

"He then asked for a whistle in low D, the same pitch as for the concert flute; this I called a "Tenor D Flageolet", but most musicians came to call it the "Low D". He took them on tour and used them extensively. I was soon getting calls from England, Ireland, Scotland, Europe and the USA, asking for the instruments, so I started to make them to order."

Hence, the expression "Irish low whistle" is not denoting an Irish origin, but just an intensive use of this instrument in Ireland and, because of cultural similarity, in the whole British archipelago. While before long several notable instrument makers (Note: Including, among others, Brian Howard, Phil Hardy, Colin Goldie, Dave Shaw (who pursued a rolled conical design), and Jon Swayne (a tunable wooden design)) were producing low whistles, it is usually the Riverdance tour of the 1990s that is credited with giving the low whistle commercial exposure and recognition outside traditional music circles. Of particular note is Davy Spillane, whose work in fusing the sound of traditional instruments such as the low whistle with modern jazz or RnB, for example, has done much for the instrument's visibility. Some of the most famous low whistle players are: Michael McGoldrick, Kevin Crawford, Phil Hardy from England, Davy Spillane, Paddy Keenan, John McSherry (musician) from Ireland, Brian Finnegan from Northern Ireland, Fred Morrison, Rory Campbell (musician), Tony Hinnigan, and Ross Ainslie from Scotland. In rock music, the multi-instrumentalist Troy Donockley occasionally plays a low whistle with the symphonic metal band Nightwish, and wind instrumentalist Jeroen Goossens has played low whistle with Arjen Lucassen's Ayreon project.

=== In British and Irish culture and traditional music ===
Unlike the regular pennywhistle, the low whistle is a relative newcomer to folk music, and some criticise it for attempting to fill a musical role already well served by the tin whistle and Irish flute. To others it is viewed as a "transition instrument" for players seeking to eventually learn the seemingly more prestigious (and expensive) flute or uilleann pipes. While it is true that many skills learnt on the low whistle carry over to these instruments, "some of the greatest players of traditional music have been associated with the low whistle" and have helped foster its reputation as a highly versatile and respected instrument in its own right, with a unique and evocative sound. Much like the Irish flat-backed bouzouki, the low whistle can be seen as a product of a period when experiments in instrumentation were commonplace in traditional music, and musicians sought diverse and innovative means of expression.
