= Declan Sinnott =

Irish musician and record producer (born 1950)

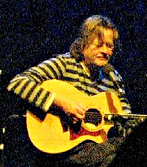
Declan Sinnott at Vicar Street, 2007.

Declan Sinnott (born 29 July 1950) is an Irish musician and record producer.

== Life ==
Originally from Wexford town, where his father was an optician and jeweller on Main Street, he came to Dublin in the late 1960s.

Around 1970, he was a member of the poetry-and-music group Tara Telephone, in which he composed, sang, and played guitar. He and poet/percussionist Eamon Carr left Tara Telephone to form the Celtic Rock band Horslips, which Sinnott left in 1972, before the recording of Horslips' first album that year.

In the 1980s, he was a member of Moving Hearts. He then devoted himself to production work with both Mary Black and her sister Frances Black. During a 13-year and six-album association, he toured all over the world with Mary Black.

He has been working with Christy Moore for over 30 years, and appeared on Moore's Ride On album in 1984. He continues to play and tour with Moore. At concerts, Sinnott has performed "Corrina, Corrina" as well as "St. Louis Blues" and "Lord Franklin". He played to a full house in Wexford's Arts Centre on his homecoming gig in July 2012, one night after his sell out show with Christy Moore in Galway. This was his last gig prior to the release of his first solo album of original works.

He recorded primarily original songs with Owen O'Brien, I Love The Noise It Makes, released on 7 September 2012 in Ireland, and on 10 and 11 September in the UK and US respectively. The first single was "Sunshine In". This was followed up in 2015 with the album, Window On The World.

== Reception ==
I Love The Noise It Makes and Window On The World have received a favourable reception in both Ireland and abroad.

== Personal life ==
Sinnott married Kathy Sinnott (née Kelly) when he was twenty two. They had nine children together, but later separated. One of their children, Kevin Sinnott, accidentally drowned while swimming at university in Georgia, US on 21 September 2009.
