= Cup =

Small container for drinks

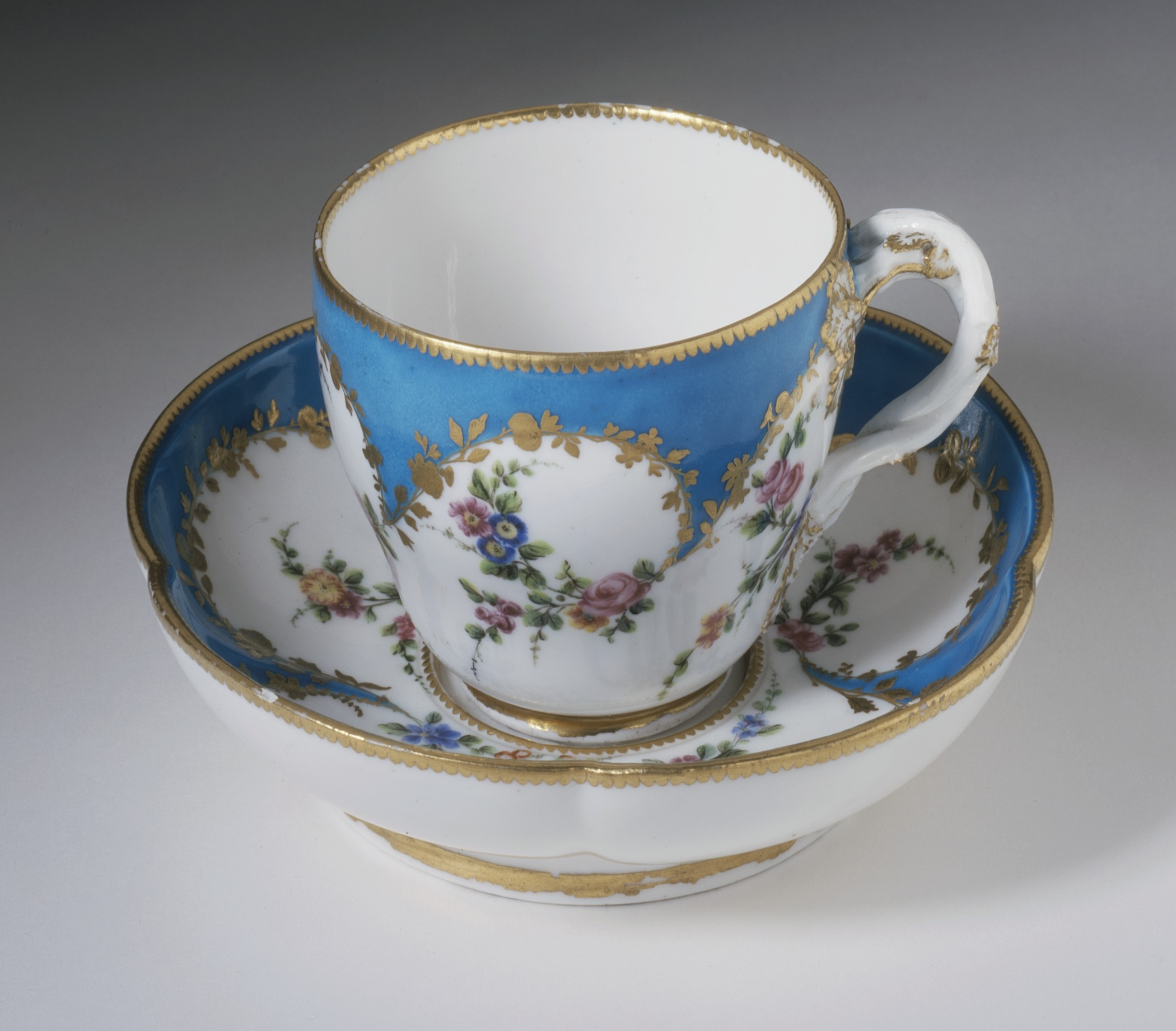
Rococo cup with saucer, circa 1753, soft-paste porcelain with overglaze enamelling, Vincennes porcelain

A cup is a small container used to hold liquids for drinking, typically with a flattened hemispherical shape and an open "mouth", and often with a capacity of about 6–16 US fluid ounces (177–473 ml). Cups may be made of pottery (including porcelain), glass, metal, wood, stone, polystyrene, plastic, lacquerware, or other materials. Normally, a cup is brought in contact with the mouth for drinking, distinguishing it from other tableware and drinkware forms such as jugs; however, a straw and/or lid may also be used. They also often have handles, though many do not, including beakers which have no handle or stem, or small bowl shapes which are very common in Asia.

There are many specific terms for different types of cups in different cultures, many depending on the type of drink they are mostly used for, and the material they are made of; in particular, cups made of glass are mostly called a "glass" in contemporary English. Cups of different styles may be used for different types of liquids or other foodstuffs (e.g, teacups and measuring cups), in different situations (e.g, at water stations or in ceremonies and rituals), or for decoration.

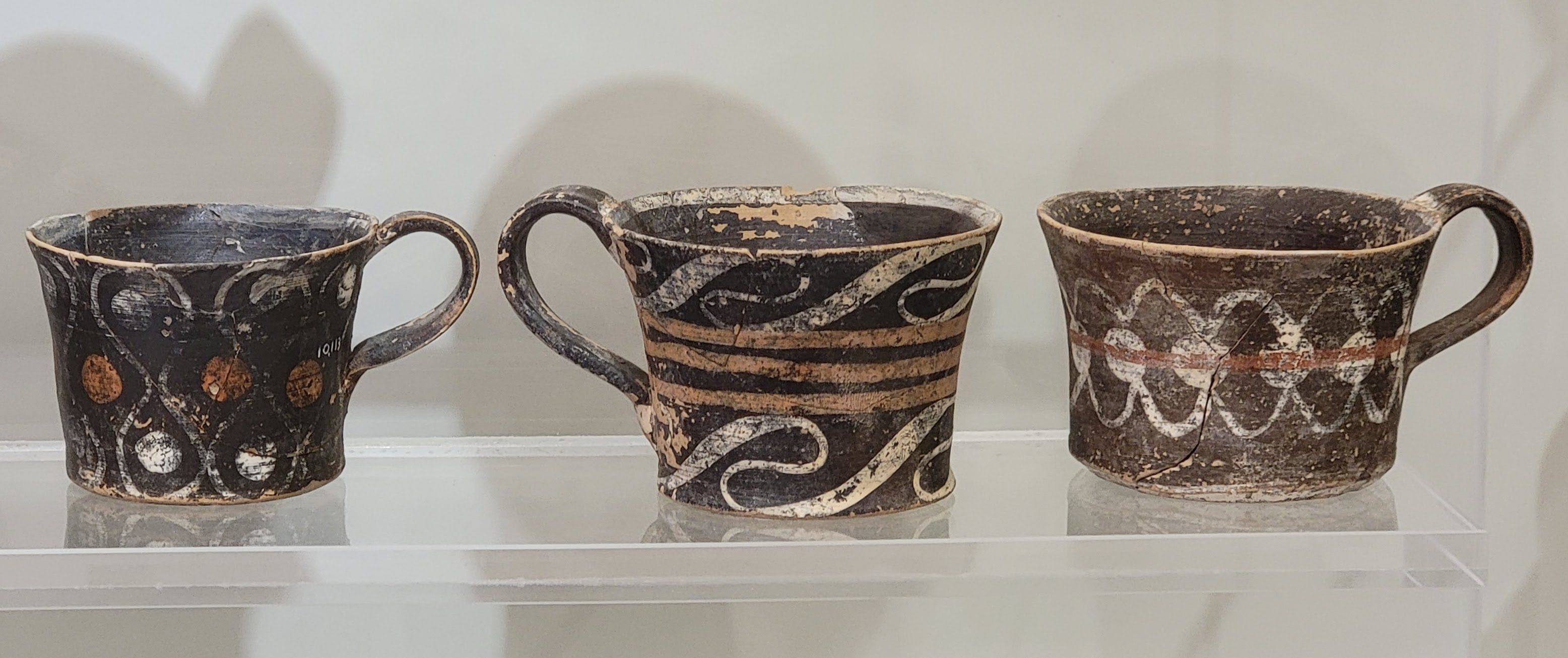
Minoan pottery cups 1800–1700 BC, Kamares ware

The history of cups goes back well into prehistory, initially mostly as handleless beakers or bowls, and they have been found in most cultures across the world in a variety of shapes and materials. While simple cups have been widely spread across societies, high-status cups in expensive materials have been very important status symbols since at least the Bronze Age, and many have been found in burials.

Modern household shapes of cups generally lack a stem, but this was not always the case. The large metal standing cup or covered cup with a base, stem and usually a cover, was an important prestige piece in medieval houses that could afford them, and often used as a "welcome cup" or for toasts. The form survives in modern sporting trophies, and in the chalices of church liturgy. The 15th-century silver Lacock Cup is a rare English secular survival. These were the sort of cups offered by cup-bearers, historically often an important office in courts.

== Definitions ==
The English word "cup" has meant a drinking vessel since at least 1000 AD. The definition of a cup is fluid, and is likely to be wider in specialist areas such as archaeology than in modern common speech. As an example, Anna Wierzbicka (1984) notes that in the 1970s the "older generation" expected a cup to be made of porcelain and have both a handle and a saucer, so that the plastic cup with neither a handle, nor a saucer, was not a "real cup", while the "younger generation" made no such distinction, and used "coffee cup" or "teacup" to indicate the traditional cups. Twelve-year-olds had two different shapes of a cup in mind, one for hot liquids, one for juices.

Names for different types of cups vary regionally and may overlap (in American English "cups" include "mugs"). Any transparent cup, regardless of actual composition, is more likely to be called a "glass"; therefore, while a flat-bottomed cup made of paper is a "paper cup", a transparent one of very similar shape, is likely to be called a "tumbler", or one of many terms for glasses, instead. Penelope Stock, a lexicographer, found that cups, mugs and glasses are "near-synonyms", although "sufficient differences" can be found that divide them into different groups.

Wierzbicka and Keith Allan (in his work "On Cup", 2020) compare definitions of the cup:

Cup definitions
| Trait | William Labov | Jerrold J. Katz | OED | Cliff Goddard | Webster's 2nd ed. |
|---|---|---|---|---|---|
| Shape | Tapering, circular | Vertically oriented, "upwardly concave" | Hemispherical | Thin round sides, smooth top edge, flat bottom | Open, bowl-shaped |
| Proportions | Similar width and depth | Height close to the top diameter that is greater than the bottom one | Small | Not big, bottom narrower than top | Small |
| Function | Drinking hot liquids | Drinking | Drinking | Drinking hot liquids with one hand | "Chiefly" drinking, commonly used for hot liquids |
| Material | Opaque "vitreous" | | | Hard and smooth | |
| Handle | One | | Optional | One, in "many things" | Optional, one or more |
| Saucer | Present | | | Present | Common |
| Stem | | | Uncommon (usually found in the chalice) | | Optional |
| Lid | | | Uncommon, not part of the "cup" itself | | Optional |

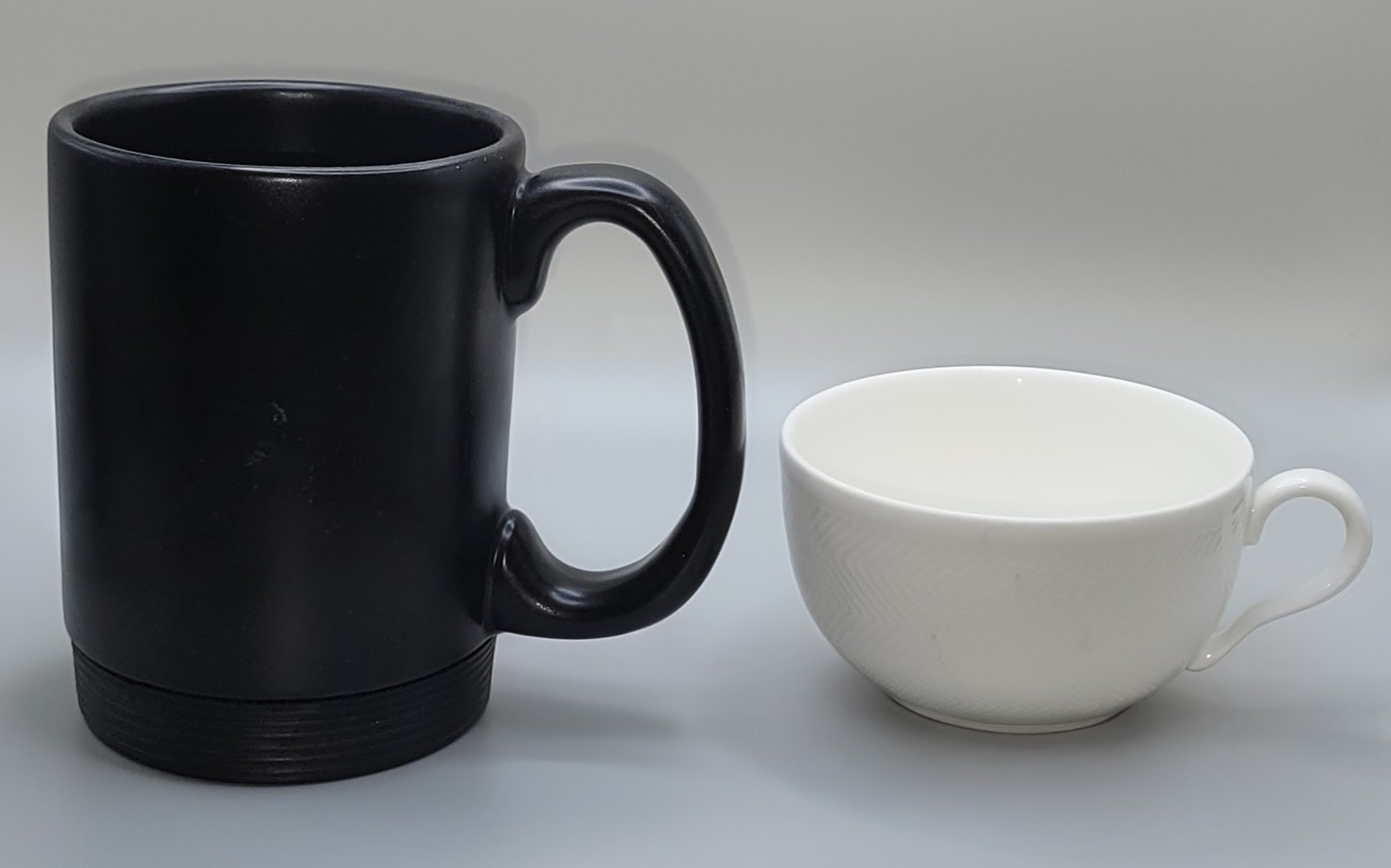
A mug and a cup side-by-side

Many languages − including English, French, Italian, Polish, Russian, German − use two separate words for mugs and cups. Wierzbicka suggests that this situation is due to a slightly different functionality: the traditional cups are designed for drinking while sitting down at the table, while the mug is supposed to be used anywhere. This, in her opinion, explains all the specific features:

- the saucer of the cup helps to protect the table surface, but is an inconvenience away from the table;
- the tapered shape of the cup accommodates the saucer, the cylindrical design of the mug is due to the absence of the saucer;
- larger handle of a mug allows carrying the mug around when putting it down is not an option;
- thicker walls of a mug allow cupping it with a second hand for convenience and reduce the chance of the mug being broken during long periods of handling;
- sitting at the table implies a more formal occasion, so cups are made to be more elegant, and sold in sets (like a tea set or a coffee service); mugs are informal and usually sold individually.
- a mug holds more liquid than the cup, as the latter is used in a close proximity of a teapot anyhow. Since limiting the area of the exposed surface of the liquid helps keeping the temperature, this increase in volume is achieved through mug being taller, while tapered cups are lower for stability.

== History ==
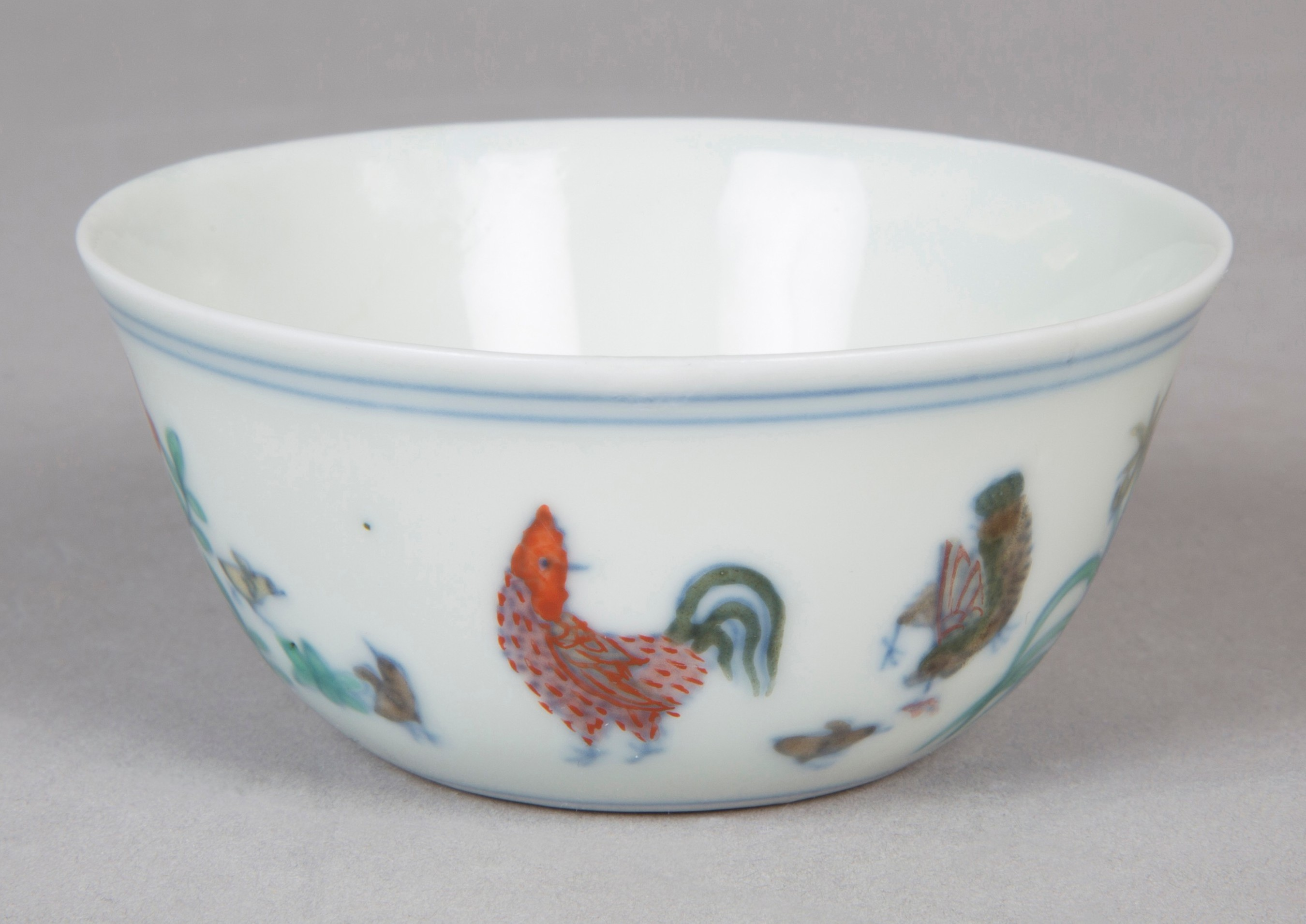
Imperial "Chicken Cup", used by the Chenghua Emperor (d. 1487) and his consort for both tea and wine; some 3 inches across, these are now the most expensive cups in the world.

Cups have been used since the Stone Age and have been found at archeological sites throughout the world. A large number of the earliest cups are excavated from burials, and may have held offerings or supplies for the afterlife. Cups do not feature strongly in the earliest pottery found in most areas; the wares were thick and heavy, as were the carved stone vessels found in several early cultures. Probably cups in organic materials that have now decomposed, such as wood, bamboo and dried gourds were widely used. Large shells and birds' eggs have been used in some areas almost up to the present. Very simple single-use kulhar cups in unglazed terracotta, and sometimes unfired clay, are still used in South Asia, now mainly at tea stalls, and are very similar to those found at sites of the Bronze Age Indus Valley Civilization.

The Bell Beaker culture, is an important archaeological culture named after the distinctive inverted-bell pottery beaker cups it used, marking the beginning of the European Bronze Age from around 2800 BC. The Ringlemere Cup is a solid gold cup, with handle, from around 1600 BC, with the Rillaton Gold Cup one of two such cups known from England, with a handful of other locations and materials (such as the Hove amber cup) making up the "unstable" (round-bottomed) cups in precious materials from the Bronze Age.

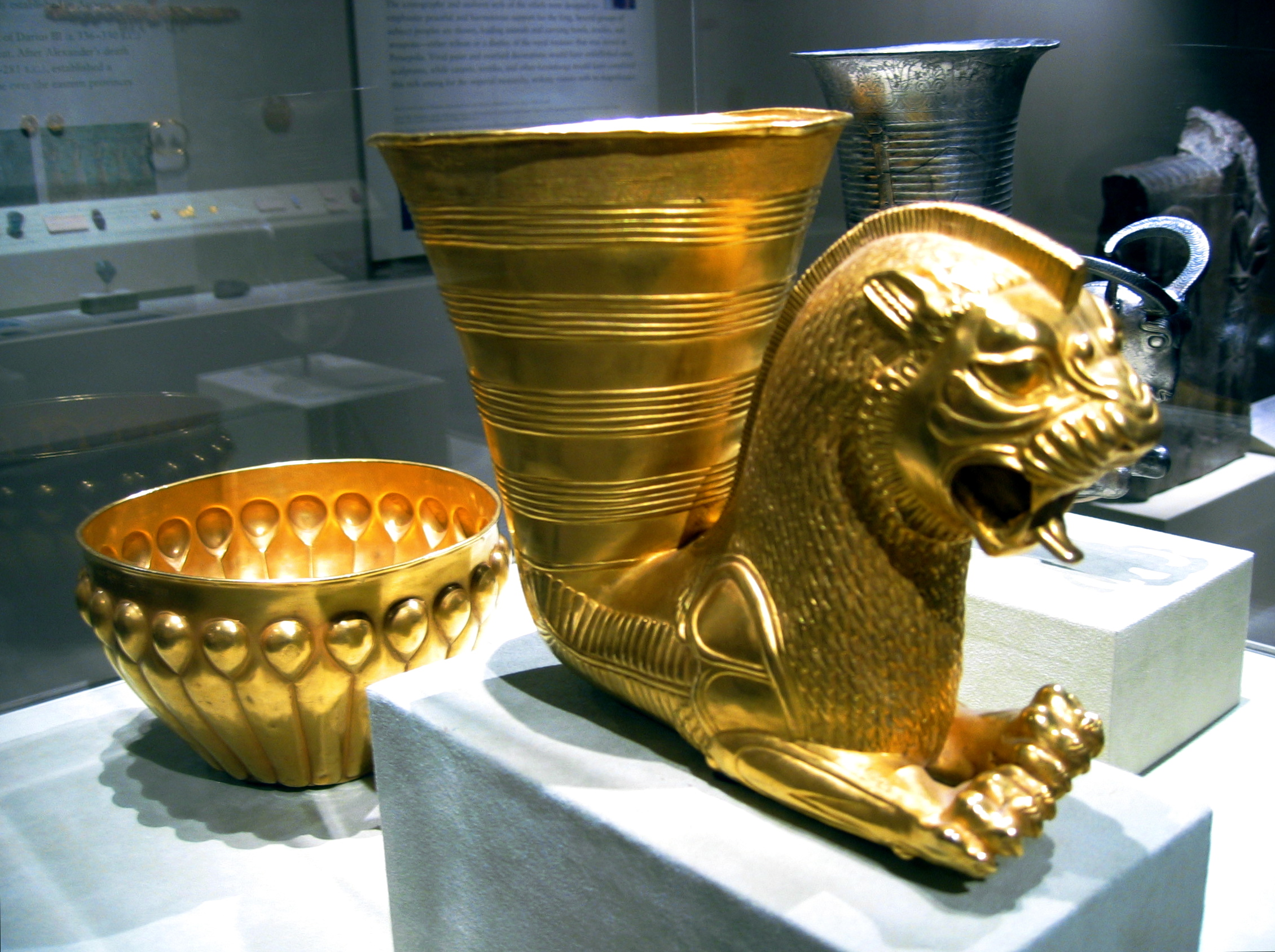
Achaemenid Persian Lion Rhyton in gold, c. 500 BC

Animal horns must often have been used as cups from very early on, and the rhyton is a cup that imitates their shape, to a greater or lesser degree, in metal or pottery. It was the general elite type of cup throughout the Mediterranean in the Iron Age, from Greece to Ancient Persia and beyond. Only some had feet or bases that allowed them to be rested on a flat surface. Large numbers were decorated with animal heads, or included the figure of an animal.

Other than the rhyton, ancient Greek drinking cup shapes had mostly very wide and shallow bowls, usually on short stems and with two handles, generally oriented horizontally, along the same plane as the mouth of the cup, rather than at 90 degrees to it, as in modern teacups. Survivals in ancient Greek pottery are numerous, and often brilliantly painted. The most important shapes are the kylix, kantharos, skyphos, lip cup, and the breast-shaped mastos with no base.

The Roman Empire used cups throughout Europe, with "goblet"-type shapes with shortish stems, or none, which was preferred for luxury cups in silver, like the Warren Cup, or Roman glass, such as the Lycurgus Cup in color-changing glass, or the spectacular carved-glass cage cups. By the 2nd century AD even the wealthy tended to prefer drinking from glass, as it added no taste to the drink.

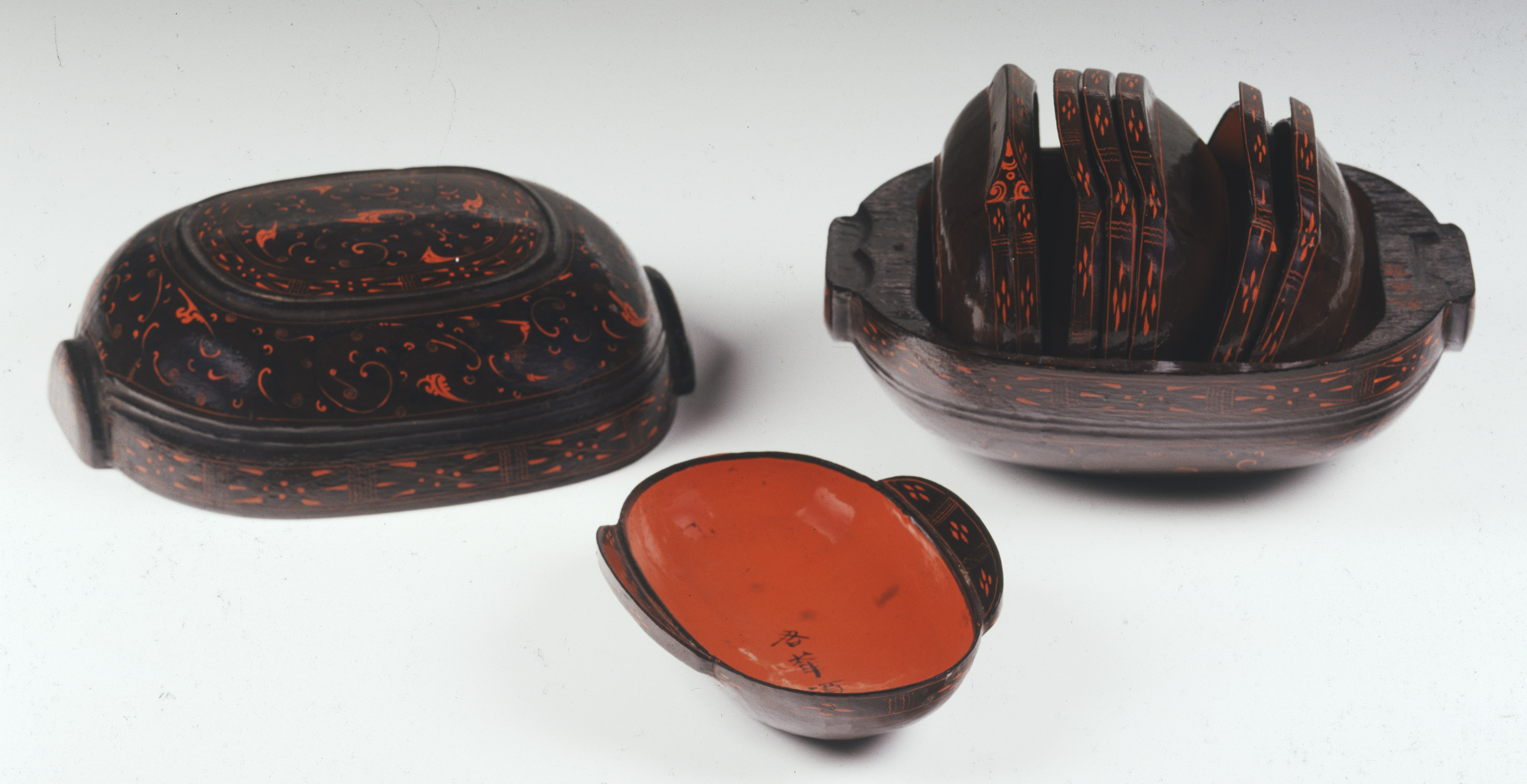
Box with set of six flanged cups in lacquer, Western Han

An ancient shape of a cup used in various parts of Eurasia was the "flanged cup" with either one or two flat horizontal strips attached to part of the top of the cup, acting as handles. These are found as grave goods in elite burials from around the Warring States Period (c. 475 to 221 BC), in Chinese lacquerware (wood coated with resin from a tree) with two flanges at the sides of an ovoid cup. These are also called "eared cups" (耳杯) and "winged goblets". A form with a flange on only one side appears in ancient Persian silver, and then later in Chinese porcelain, apparently gradually developing into a shape for brush-washers on the calligrapher's desk.

Most ancient types of cup from the Americas were pottery, but around the Gulf of Mexico, Native American societies used the shells of the Horse conch for drinking cups, among other purposes. The tall, decorated and slightly waisted qiru or keru of Andean civilizations first appears in the Early Intermediate Period (100–600 AD). They seem to have been high-status objects. Maya elites drank from elaborately painted pottery beakers such as the Fenton Vase and Princeton Maya Vase with God L.

In what is now the south-eastern US, traces of Yaupon tea containing caffeine have been found in pottery cups of an unusual shape: straight-sided, with a single thick spike as a handle near the top, opposite a slight pouring lip.

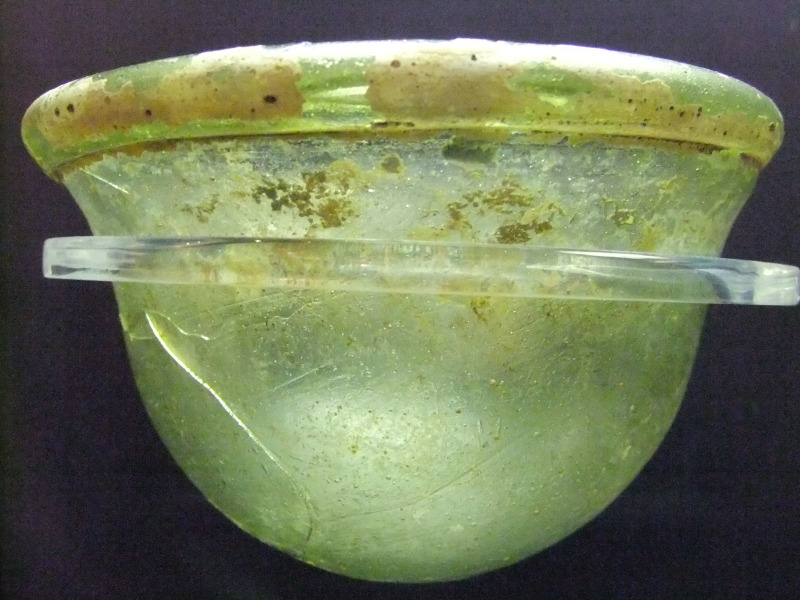
"unstable" palm cup in Anglo-Saxon glass

In the Early Middle Ages glass remained in production in northern Europe, especially Germany, probably as a luxury material. Anglo-Saxon glass had several types of cup, most shared with continental areas, including "palm cups" with no flat bottom, claw beakers, glass horns, and different types of beaker.

In the European Middle Ages the shapes of most ordinary cups were closer to mugs, tankards, and goblets rather than modern cups, in wood, pottery, or sometimes boiled leather. But the elite preferred cups with stems, and often covers, in metal, with glass a less common alternative. Large "ceremonial" or feasting cups, sometimes called grace cups or "welcome cups", and drinking horns, including ivory, with metal mounts, were important prestige pieces, typically too large to drink from all evening, so passed around or drunk from once. The name for the very wide ancient Greek wine-cup kylix ended up via Latin as chalice, typically a handle-less goblet in metal, used in the Catholic mass, but also a secular shape. Many individual examples have served both secular and liturgical uses over their history.

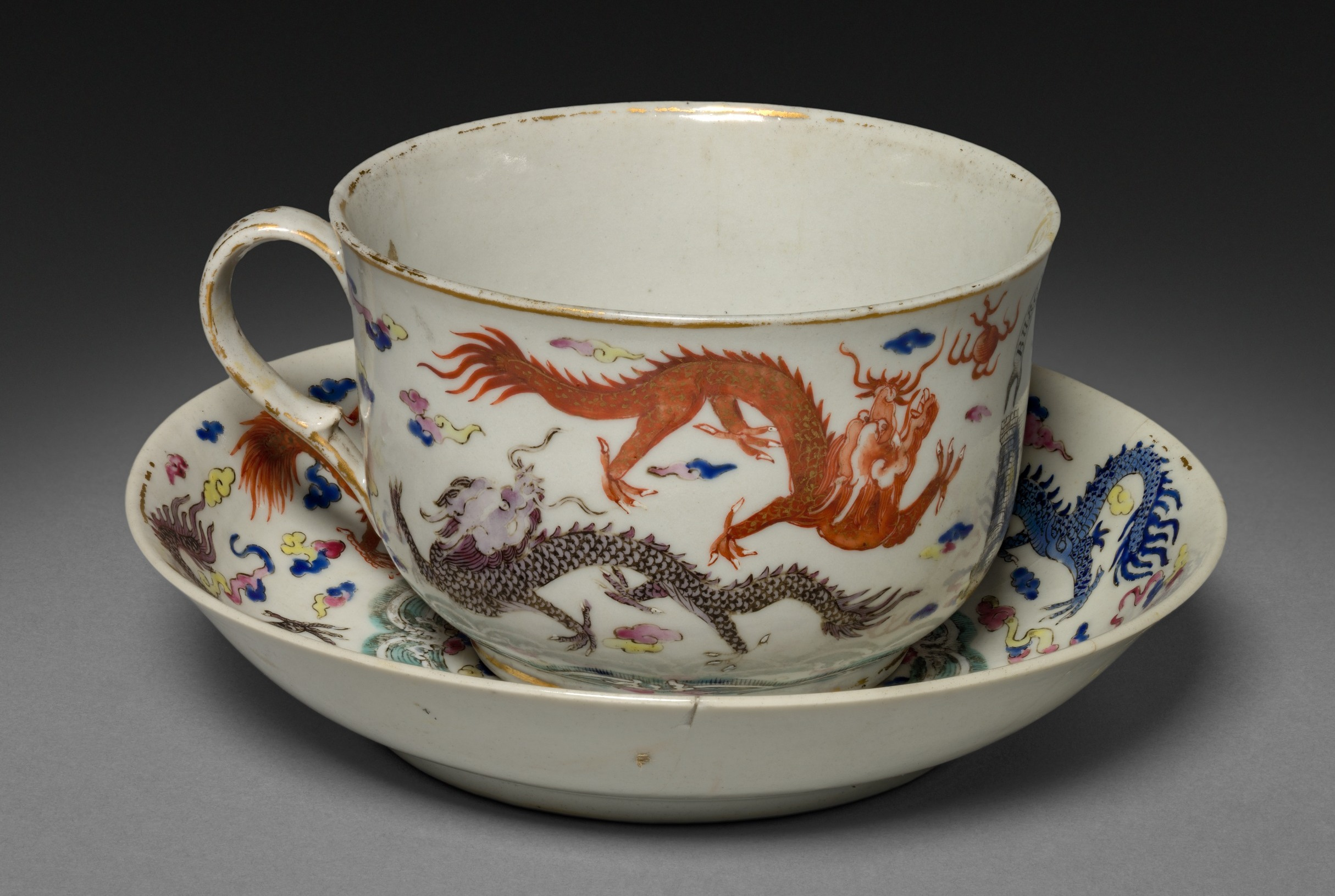
Chinese export porcelain tea cup and saucer in the Western style with handle; 1745; diameter: 10.2 cm. The deep saucer is typical of the period

By the end of the Middle Ages glass was becoming a much cheaper material, and over the Early Modern Period it replaced pottery and other materials as the norm for cups intended for cold drinks, especially wine and beer. The "wine cup" that had been a major prestige category since classical antiquity was largely replaced by the wineglass, and cups for beer went the same way. Timothy Schroder places this change in England around the end of the 17th century, though others put it nearer the beginning The OED records the first dated use in English of "glass" as a term for a vessel, rather than just the material, in 1393-4. A new wave of hot drinks came to dominate the range of cups.

Chinese and Japanese cups have been shaped as small, rather wide, bowls for some 2,000 years, with smaller versions of the shape used for eating and serving food. As well as the Chinese porcelain that very gradually overtook it, lacquer is a prestige material. The same shapes are typically used in East Asia for both tea and wine or sake, and when they appeared in Europe in the 16th century, this shape was initially used for locally made cups for the new drinks of tea and coffee.

By the early 18th century, the European taste for handles on cups, strongly evident from antiquity, reasserted itself and a single vertical handle was added to a slightly more upright Chinese-style bowl to create both the very similar forms of the Western teacup and coffee cup, as well as a saucer. This was initially rather deeper than modern saucers, as it was considered usual to pour the hot liquid into the saucer to cool it slightly before drinking. Apart from a more shallow saucer the essential elements of these two forms in many contemporary examples have changed little since the mid-18th century. European porcelain manufacturers encouraged the development of different sizes of cups, and shapes of pots, for tea and coffee services.

The 20th century brought the plastic cup, in both disposable and permanent washable forms, and the paper cup, normally disposable. Materials such as processed bamboo have also come into use.

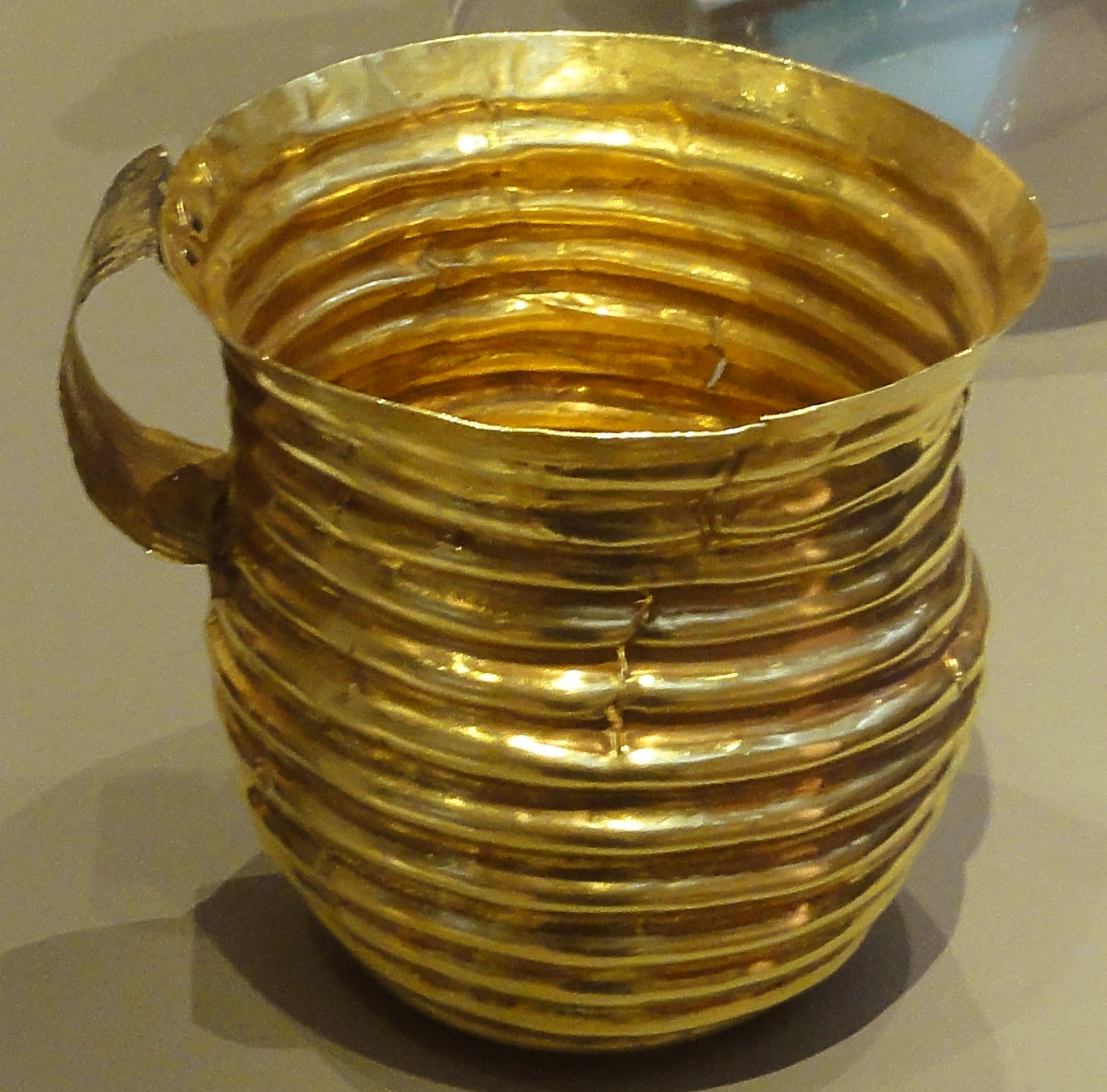
The Rillaton gold cup, Cornwall, perhaps c. 1700 BC. British Museum

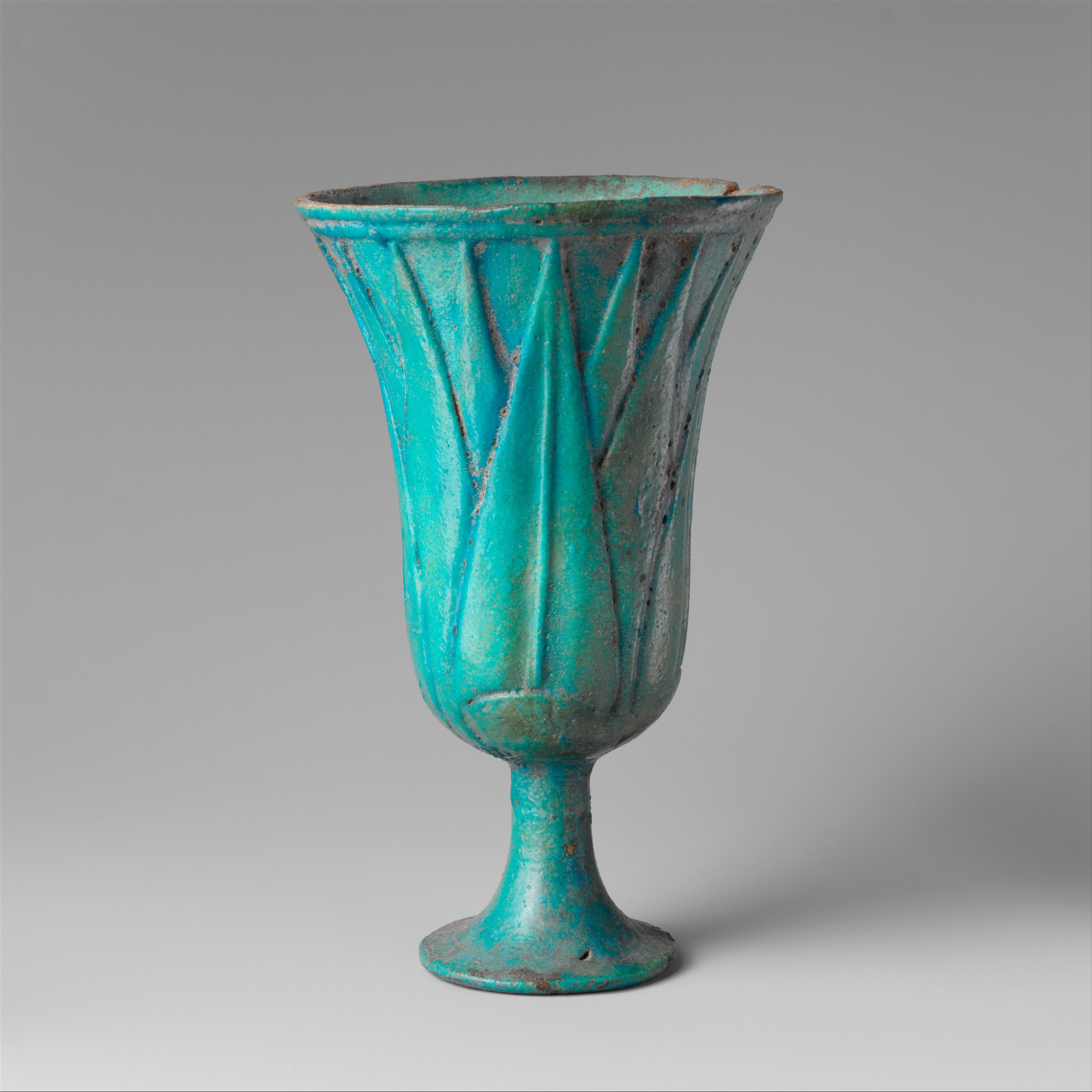
Ancient Egyptian lotiform cup; 1295-1185 BC; faience; height: 15 cm, diameter: 9.1 cm

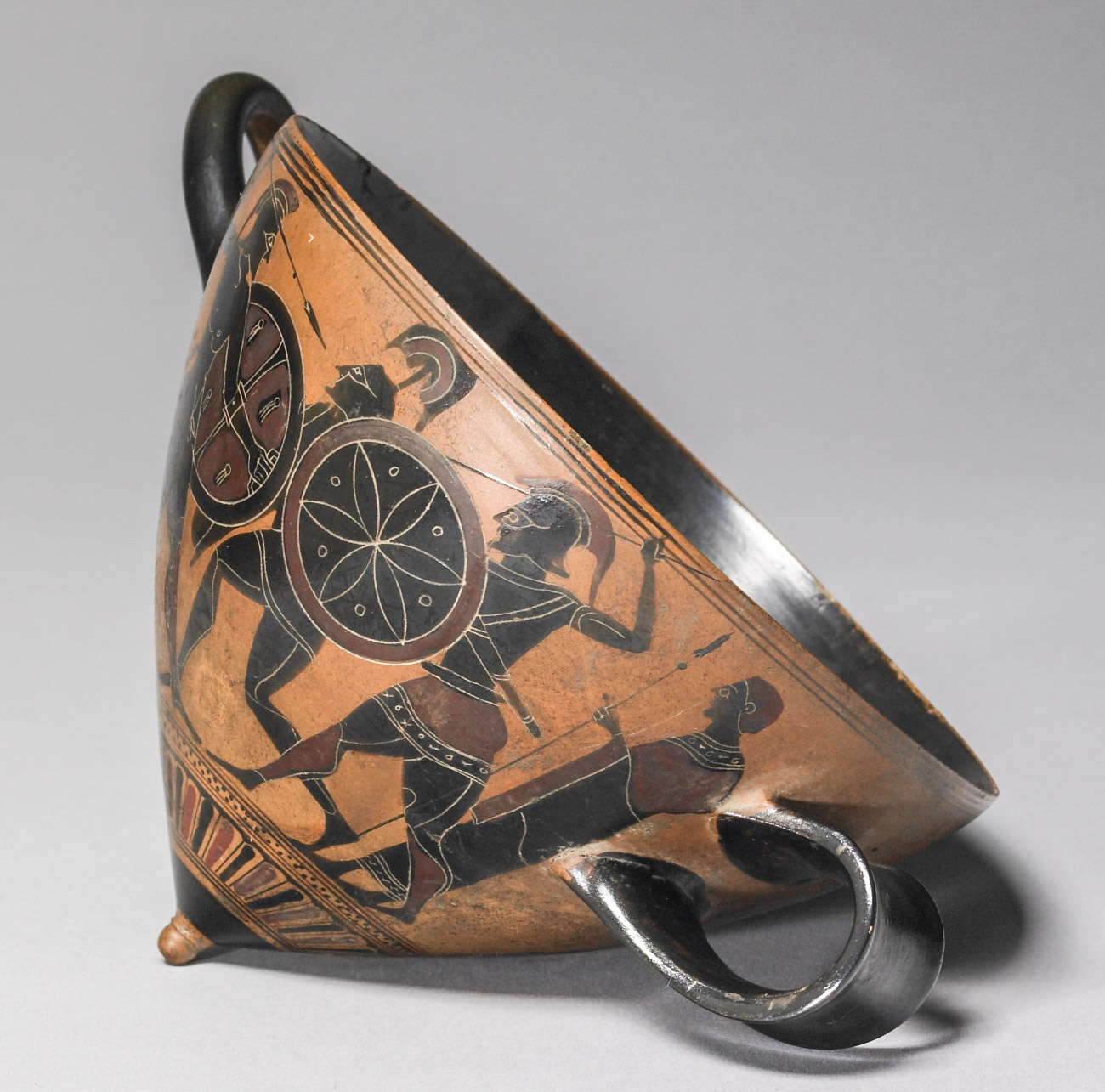
Greek black-figure mastos, ca. 530 BC, with combat scenes, a form of "unstable cup" named and modelled after a female breast

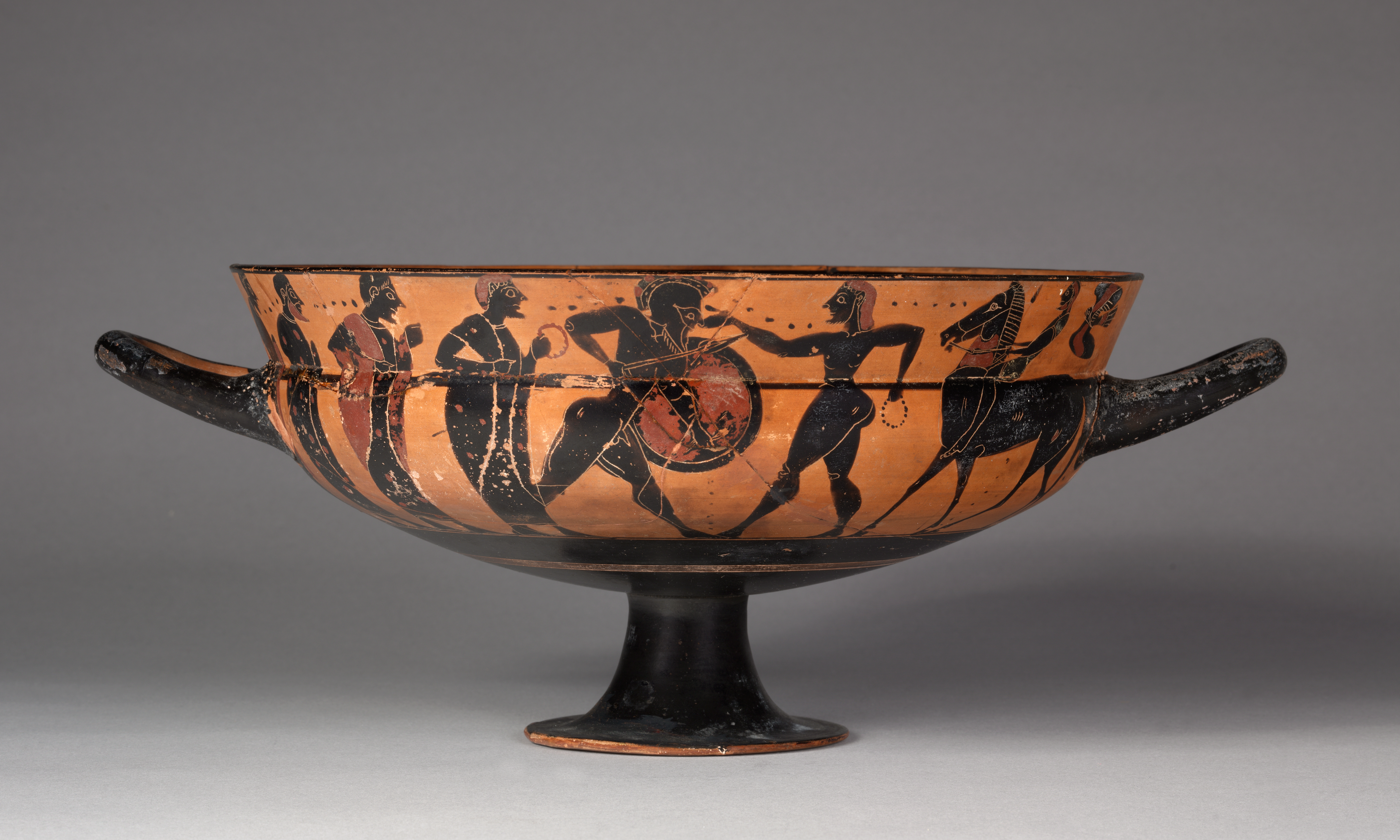
Ancient Greek kylix; 575-550 BC; black-figure; diameter: 26.8 cm, overall: 14.1 cm

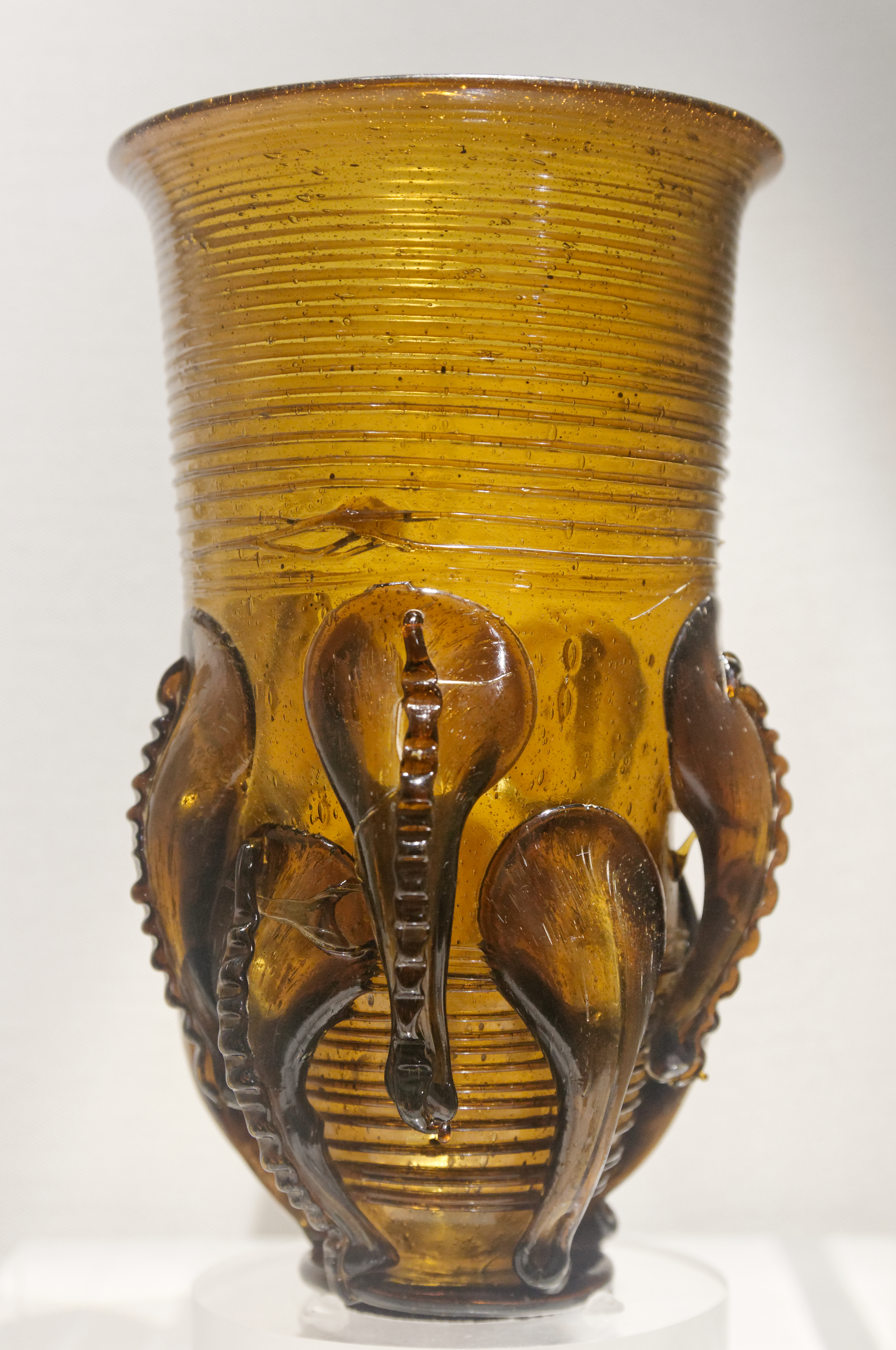
Claw beaker in Anglo-Saxon glass from the Ringlemere barrow, c. 400 to 600 AD

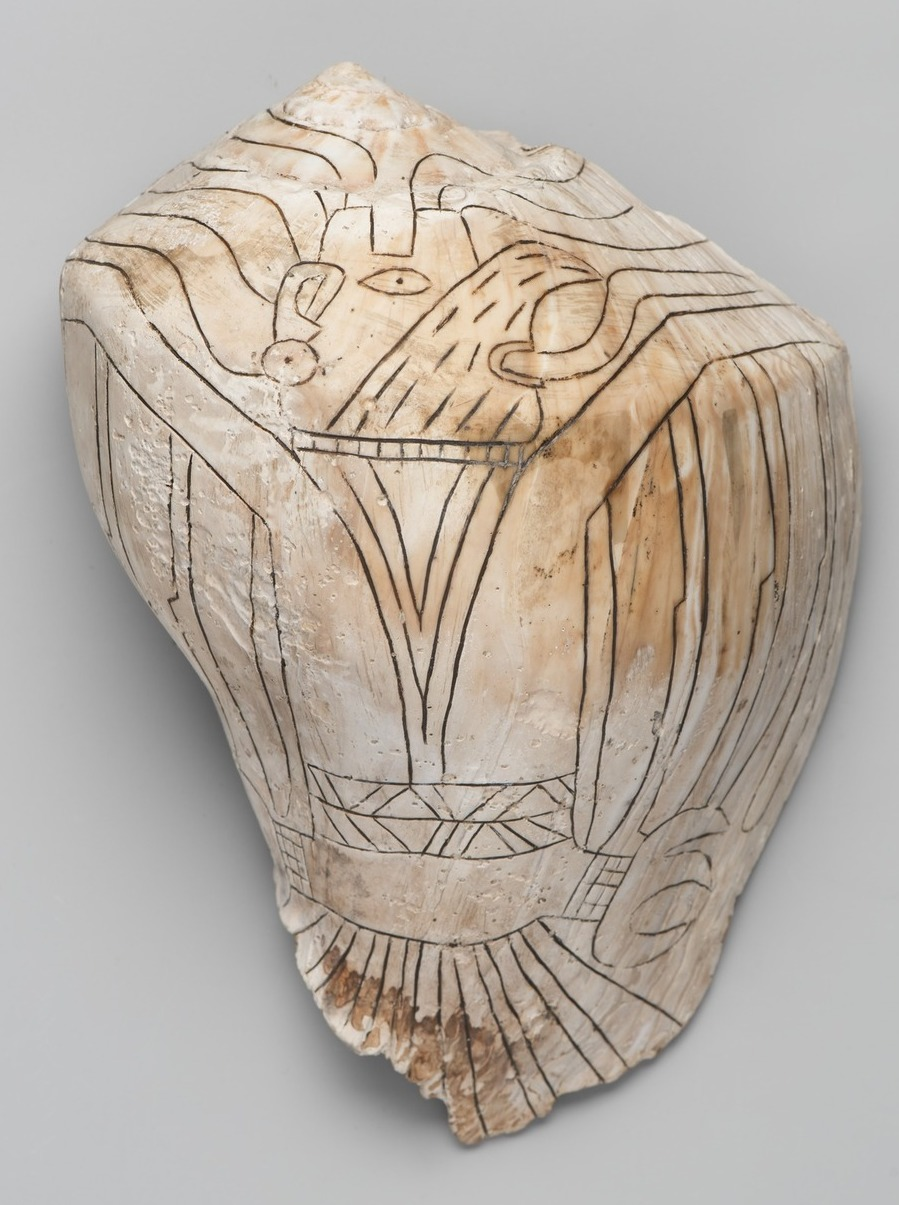
"Falcon warrior" shell cup, from the Spiro Mounds, eastern Oklahoma, 1200-1500

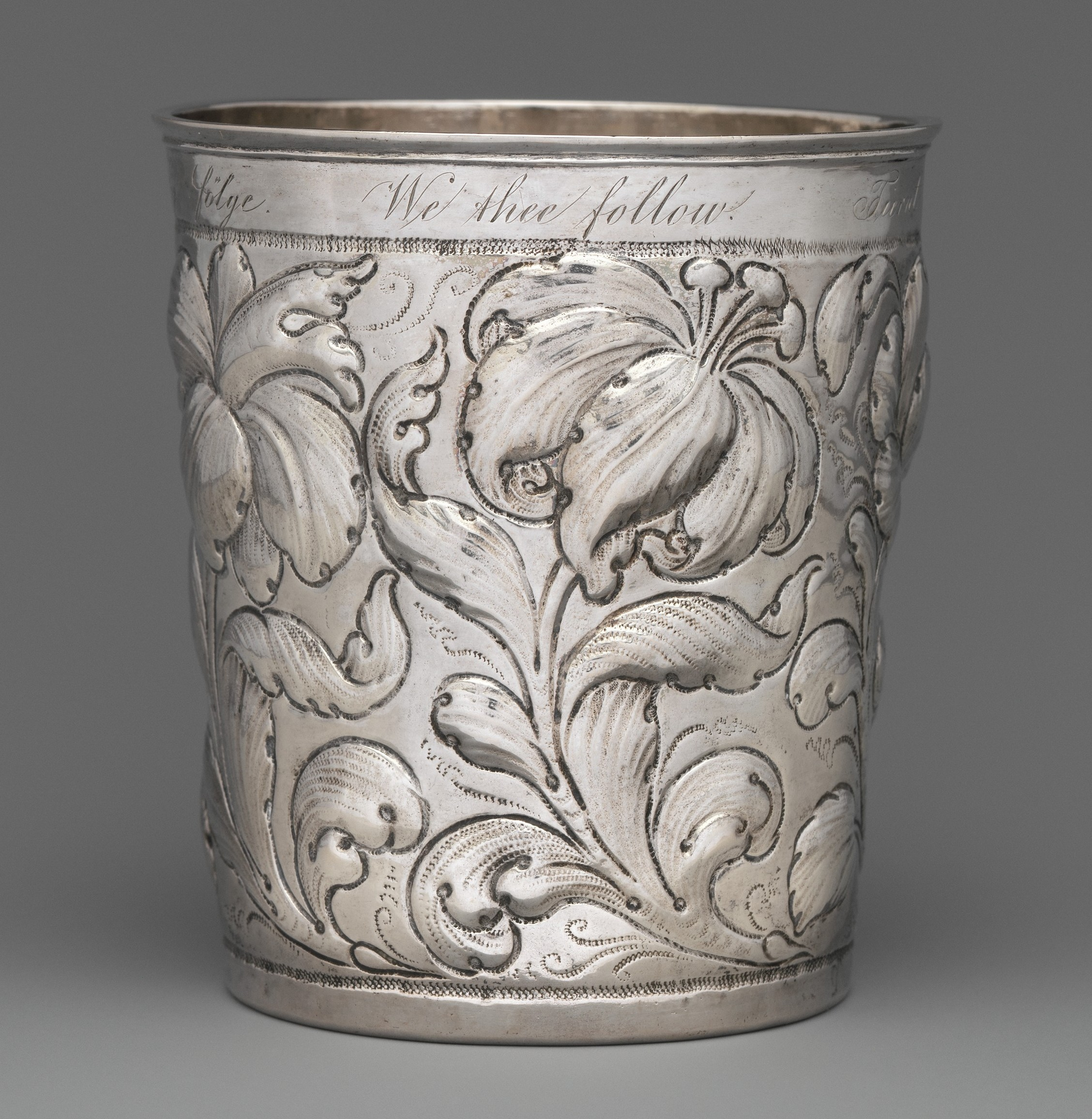
Silver beaker, possibly Norwegian, second half of the 17th century, silver, overall: 9.2 × 8.3 cm

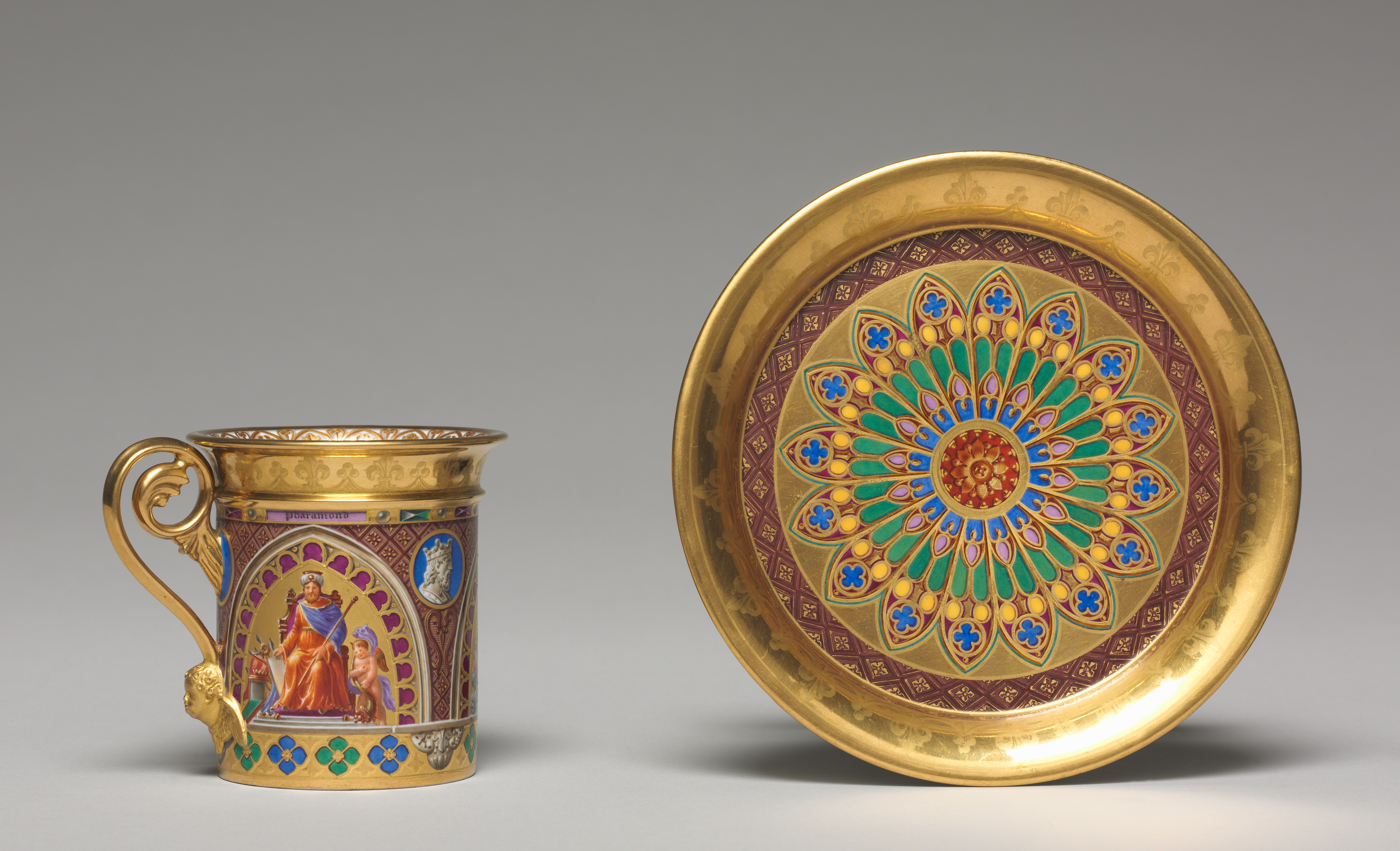
Sèvres cabinet cup and saucer, decorated with Gothic Revival ornament; 1827; porcelain; overall: 8.2 x 10 cm

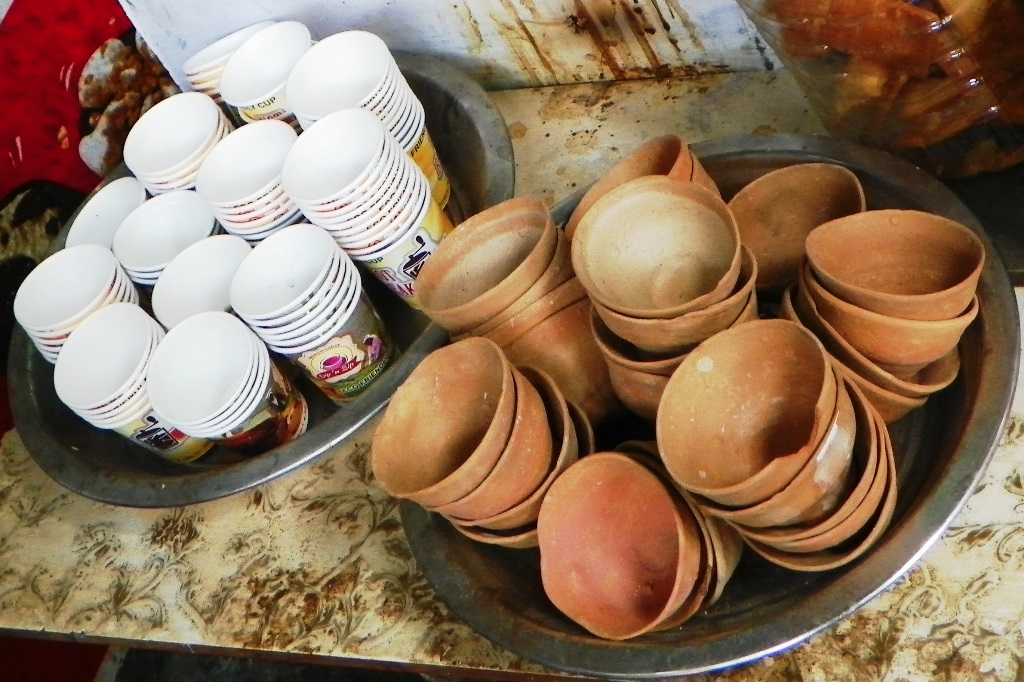
Old kulhar and new paper cups at a "tea stand" in Kolkata, India in 2015

== Cultural significance and use ==
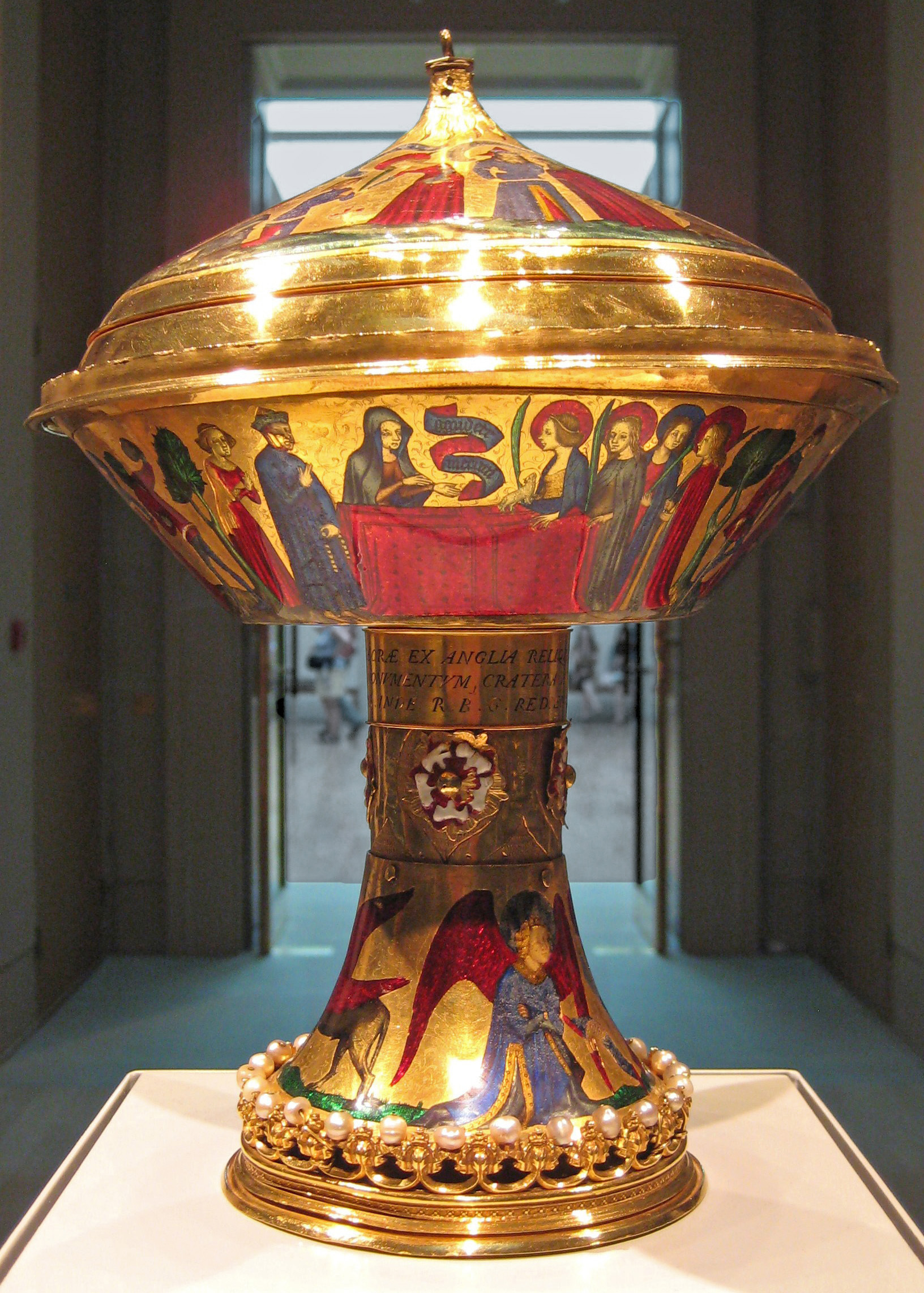
The Royal Gold Cup, before 1391, 23.6 cm high, 17.8 cm across at its widest point; weight 1.935 kg, British Museum. Saint Agnes appears to her friends in a vision.

Since cups have been an integral part of dining since time immemorial, they have become a valued part of human culture. Cups are used by a wide range of cultures and social classes.

=== Court culture ===
Historically, monarchs have been concerned about assassination via poisoning. To avoid this fate, they often used dedicated cups, with cup-bearers to guard them. A "divining cup" was supposed to be able to detect poison. In the Bible, Joseph interpreted a dream for Pharaoh's cup-bearer, and a silver divining cup played a key role in his reconciliation with his brothers.

The Royal Gold Cup is an exceptionally rare survival, made before 1391 for John, Duke of Berry, a French prince, who gave it to his uncle, Charles VI of France. It is in gold, decorated with jewels and scenes in enamel, with a cover and a boiled leather carrying case. It once had a triangular stand which has been lost. It weighs 1.935 kilos, so was perhaps used ceremonially rather than throughout meals.

=== Religion ===
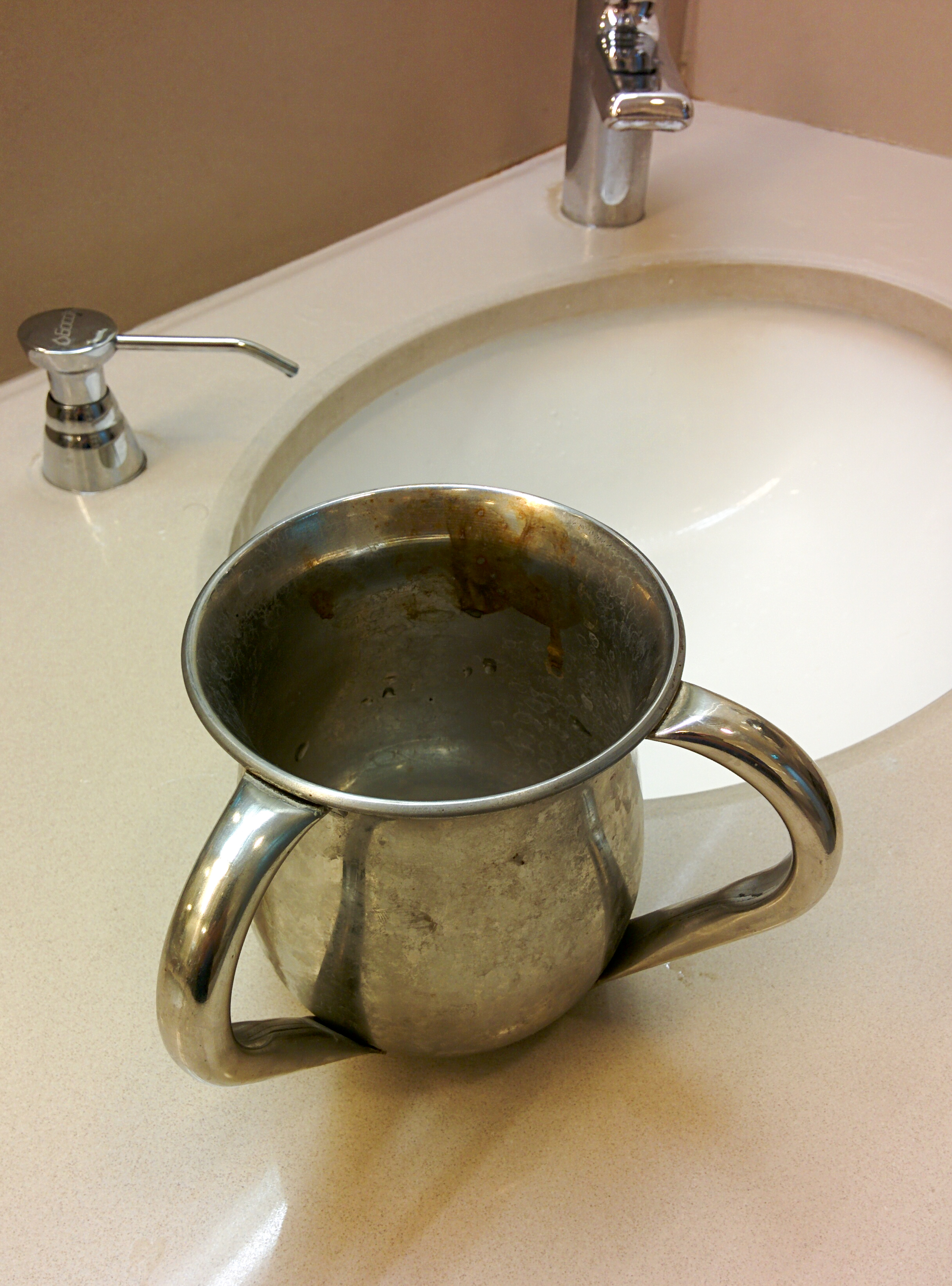
A two-handled Natla (נַטְלָה) cup used for ritual washing in Judaism

Practices in many religions in the world, including the Ancient Greek and Roman religions, included libations, the pouring of a small amount of liquid onto an altar, image or just onto the ground. Some shapes of cup, such as the wide and shallow Greek phiale (Roman patera, more a dish than a cup) seem mainly to have been used for this, while others were used for both this and drinking. The rhyton, especially the types with a hole in the bottom, was one of many cup shapes used for libations. Libations were common at the start of informal social occasions involving drinking, where normal cups were presumably often used.

The most traditional Chinese ritual bronze vessel for libations, the jue, has a large pouring lip, and may be regarded as a type of jug rather than a cup.

In the Christian ritual of Communion, adherents drink from a cup of wine (or a wine substitute) to commemorate the Last Supper of Jesus. A chalice is often used for this purpose. Chalices are usually handleless metal cups on stems; originally such shapes were standard secular elite drinking cups, and many examples such as the Royal Gold Cup have been used for both religious and secular purposes over their history.

=== Cuisine ===
The word "cup" is also used as a unit of capacity: the capacity of a "typical" cup, varying slightly from place to place is mostly used in recipes. The measuring cup, an adaptation of a simple cup, is an accessory used in cooking that has been in use since at least Roman times.

Apart from serving as drinking vessels, cups can be used as an alternative to bowls as a receptacle, especially, for soup. Recipes have been published for cooking various dishes in cups in the microwave. Although mainly used for drinking, cups can also be used to store solids for pouring (e.g., sugar, flour, grains, salt).

=== Medicine ===
Cupping therapy uses heated cups applied to the body to raise the skin, for which a variety of health benefits are claimed. In the Western world, this is regarded as alternative medicine. Antimonial cups were made of antimony. If wine was kept in them for some hours, and then drunk, there was an emetic or laxative effect.

Coconut cups, in Europe, are typically expensive standing cups with silver mounts, and were long believed to have a range of medical benefits, including (like the rarer rhinoceros horn cups), the ability to detect or neutralize poisoned drinks.

Spa cups are special cups that are used to drink mineral or thermal water directly from a spring, developed in north-west Bohemia during the 17th century and are now part of Czech folklore.

=== Heraldry ===
Chalices are sometimes used in heraldry, especially ecclesiastical heraldry. A Kronkåsa is a type of elaborate wooden cup which was used by the Swedish nobility during the Renaissance.

=== Children ===
Drinking from a cup is a significant step in a baby's path to becoming a toddler; it is recommended that children switch from bottles to cups between six months and one year of age. Sippy cups are typically used for this transition. Like other cups for children, these are normally plastic cups. Special cups for infants seem to date back to the Neolithic age, some shaped like animals, apparently just to engage the child.

=== Sports ===
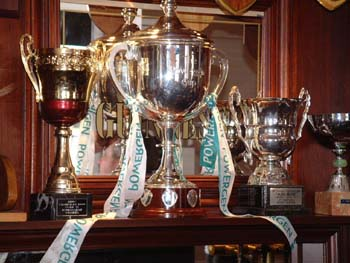
Many trophies take the form of a cup. In sports, competitions themselves often take on the name of the cup-shaped trophy awarded.

Many trophies take the form of a decorated cup, generally in metal. In cases such as the FIFA World Cup and the Stanley Cup, the competition itself may grow to take on the name of the trophy that is awarded to the winner. Owing to the common usage of cup-shaped trophies as prizes for the winners, a large number of national and international competitions are called "cups".

For large examples, the two-handled form based on the ancient kantharos is very often used. The size of many means that "vase" would be a more appropriate name, but "cup" has become established. Early trophies, mostly for horse-racing, were generally more simple goblet shapes.

=== Games ===
In Tarot divination, the suit of cups is associated with the element of water and is regarded as symbolizing emotion, intuition, and the soul. Cards that feature cups are often associated with love, relationships, fears, and desires.

Various cups have been designed so that drinking out of them without spilling is a challenge. These are called puzzle cups.

- Pythagorean cup
- Fuddling cup
- Puzzle jug

The cup game involves rhythmically striking plastic cups.

=== Promotion ===
In the developed world, cups are often distributed for promotional purposes. For example, a corporation might distribute cups with their logo at events, or a city might give out cups with slogans. There are companies that provide the service of printing slogans on cups.

=== Hot beverages ===
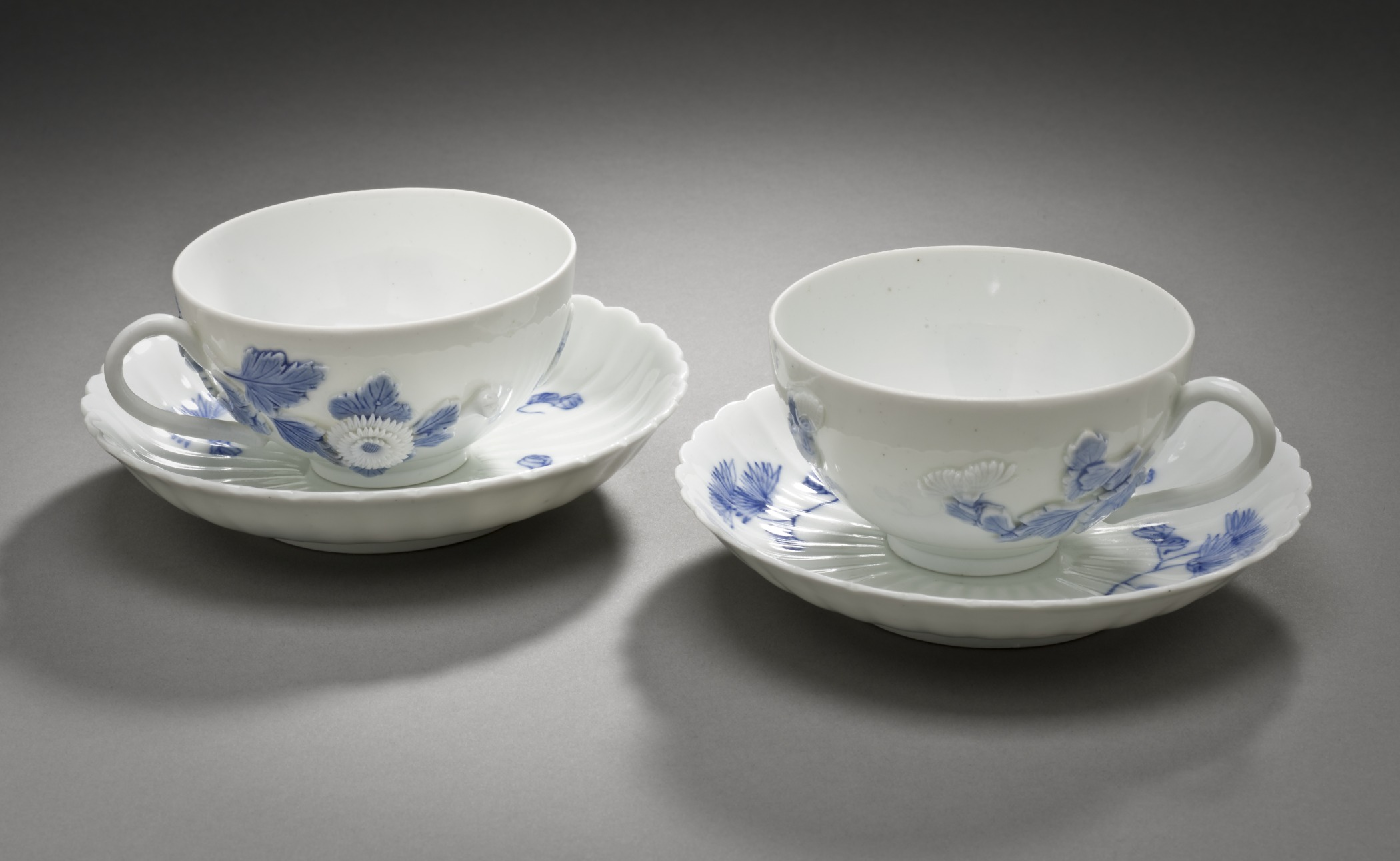
Teacups on saucers, Japanese export porcelain, 19th century

While in theory, most cups are well suited to hold drinkable liquids, hot drinks like tea are generally served in either insulated cups or porcelain teacups.

- Coffee cup
- Mazagran
- Mug
- Teacup
- Thermos
- Travel mug
- Moustache cup

Metal and glass cups can use a double wall construction with a vacuum-sealed space in-between to reduce the loss of heat and keep outside surfaces cooler.

=== Disposable ===
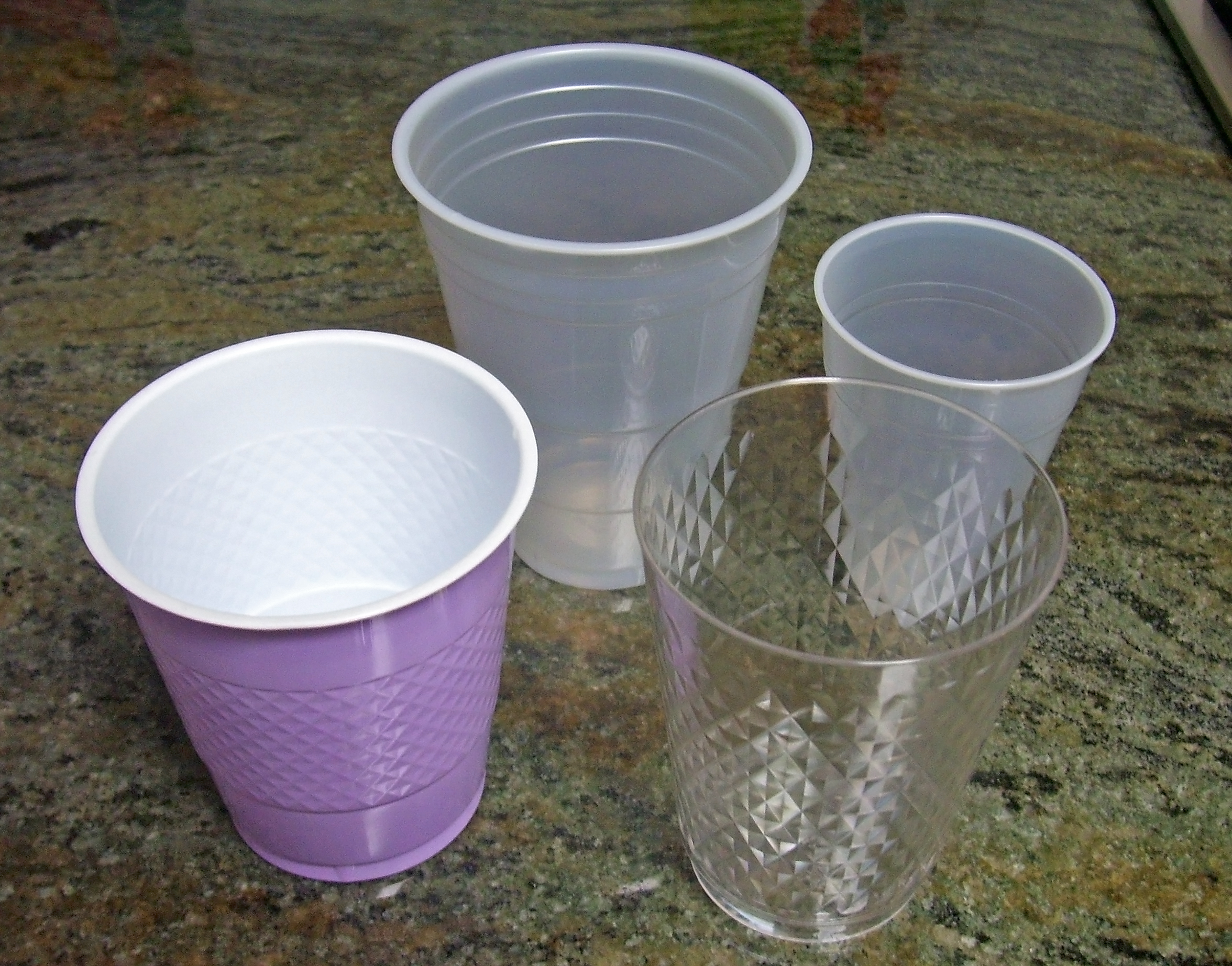
Assorted plastic cups, commonly used for informal dining.

Disposable cups are intended to be used only once. They are often used by fast-food restaurants and coffee shops to serve beverages. Institutions that provide drinking water, such as offices and hospitals, may also use disposable cups.

- Paper cup
- Plastic cup
- Glass cup
- Foam cup

=== For alcoholic beverages ===
Some styles of cups are used primarily for alcoholic beverages such as beer, wine, cocktail, and liquor. There are over a dozen distinct styles of cups for drinking beer, depending on the precise variety of beer. The idea that certain beer should be served in a cup of a certain shape may have been promulgated for marketing purposes, but there may be some basis in fact behind it. Wine glasses also come in different shapes, depending on the color and style of wine that is intended to be served in them.

- Beer stein
- Pint glass
- Old Fashioned glass
- Quaich
- Sake cup (ochoko)
- Shot glass
- Tankard
- Wine glass
- Goblet

=== For measurement, suction and breasts ===
- Measuring cup
- Suction cup
- Bra cup

== Gallery ==
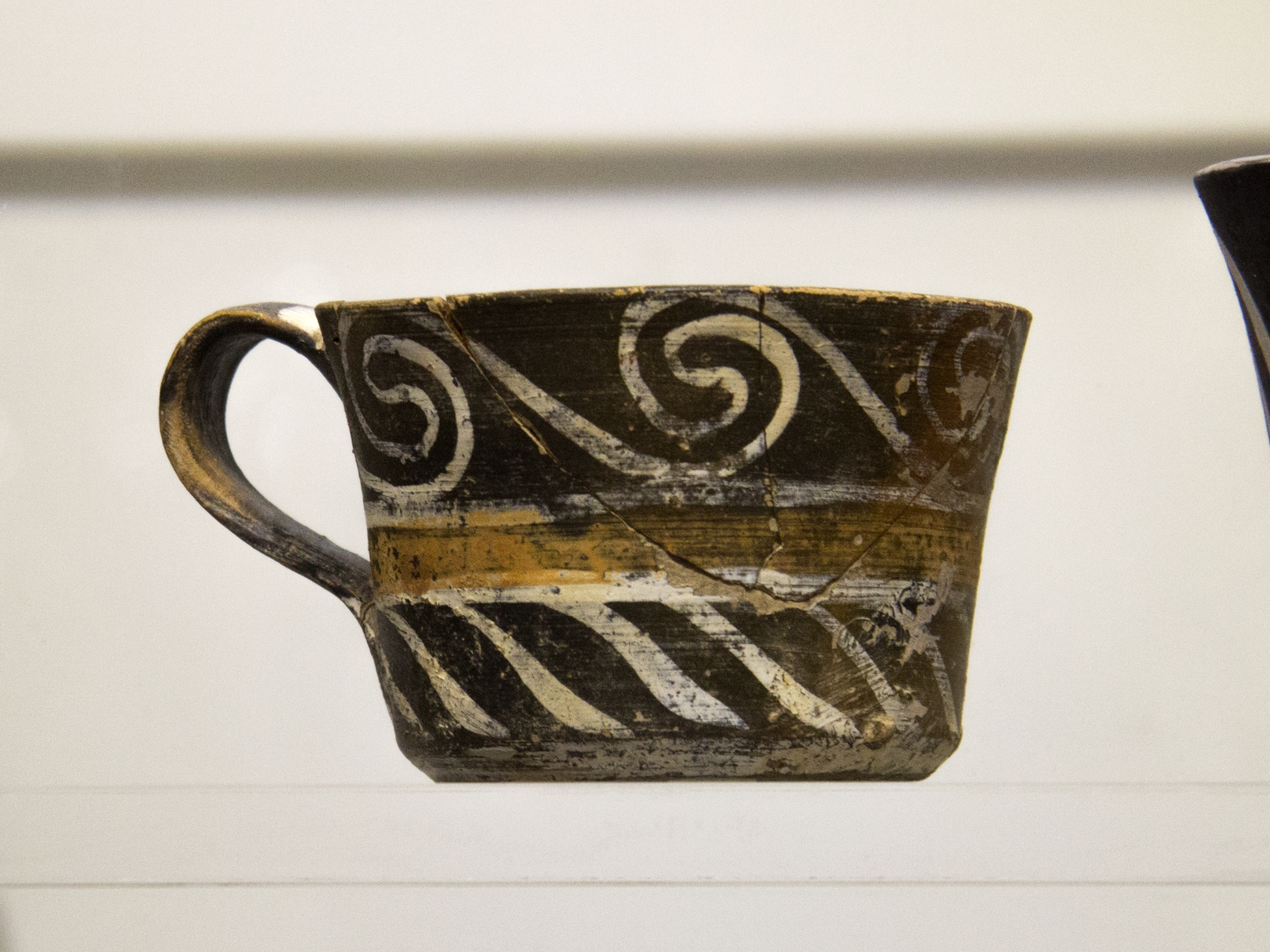
Minoan Kamares ware; 1800-1700 BC; from Phaistos (Crete); Archaeological Museum of Heraklion (Heraklion, Crete, Greece)

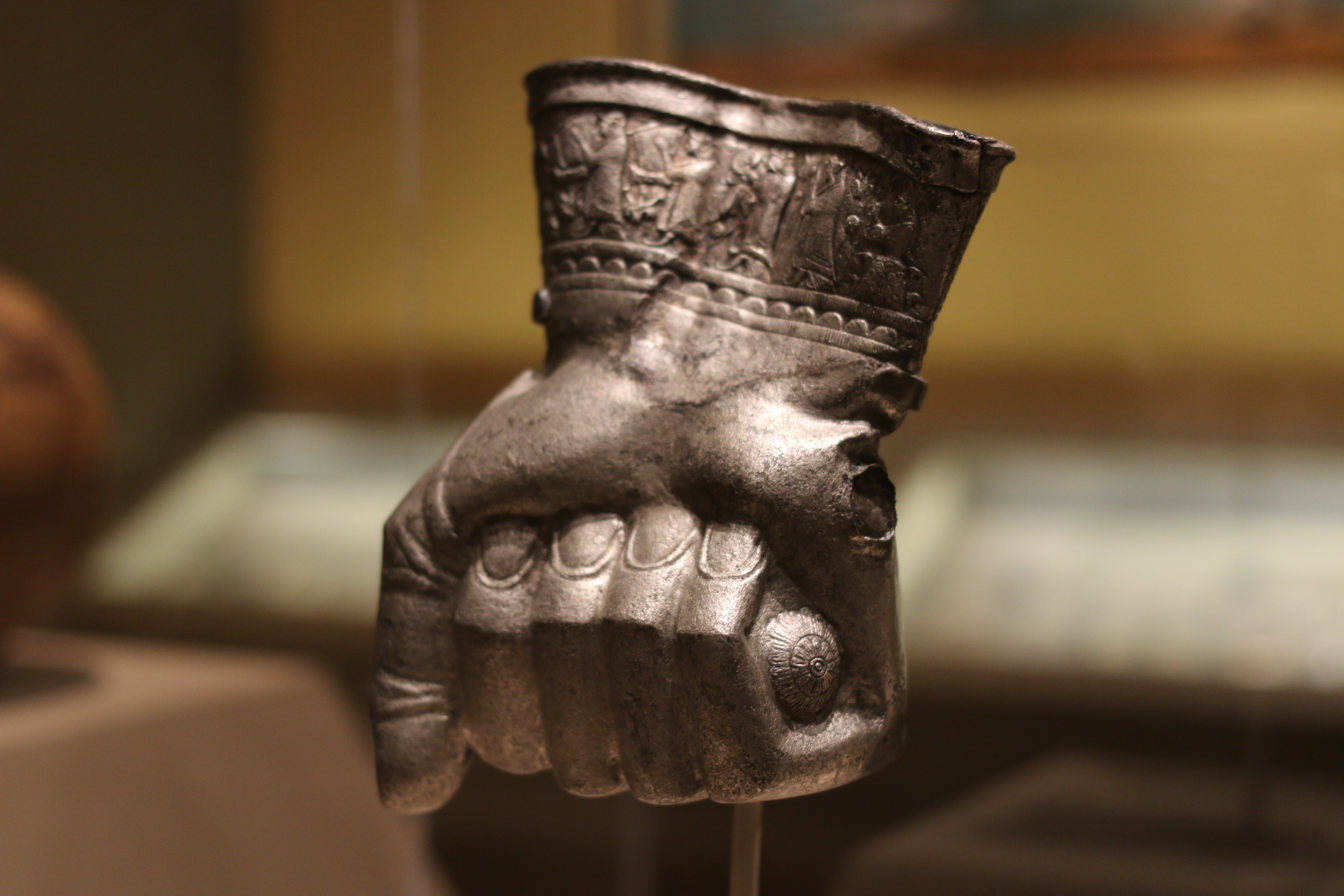
Hittite drinking cup in the shape of a fist; 1400-1380 BC; silver; from Central Turkey; Museum of Fine Arts (Boston, USA)

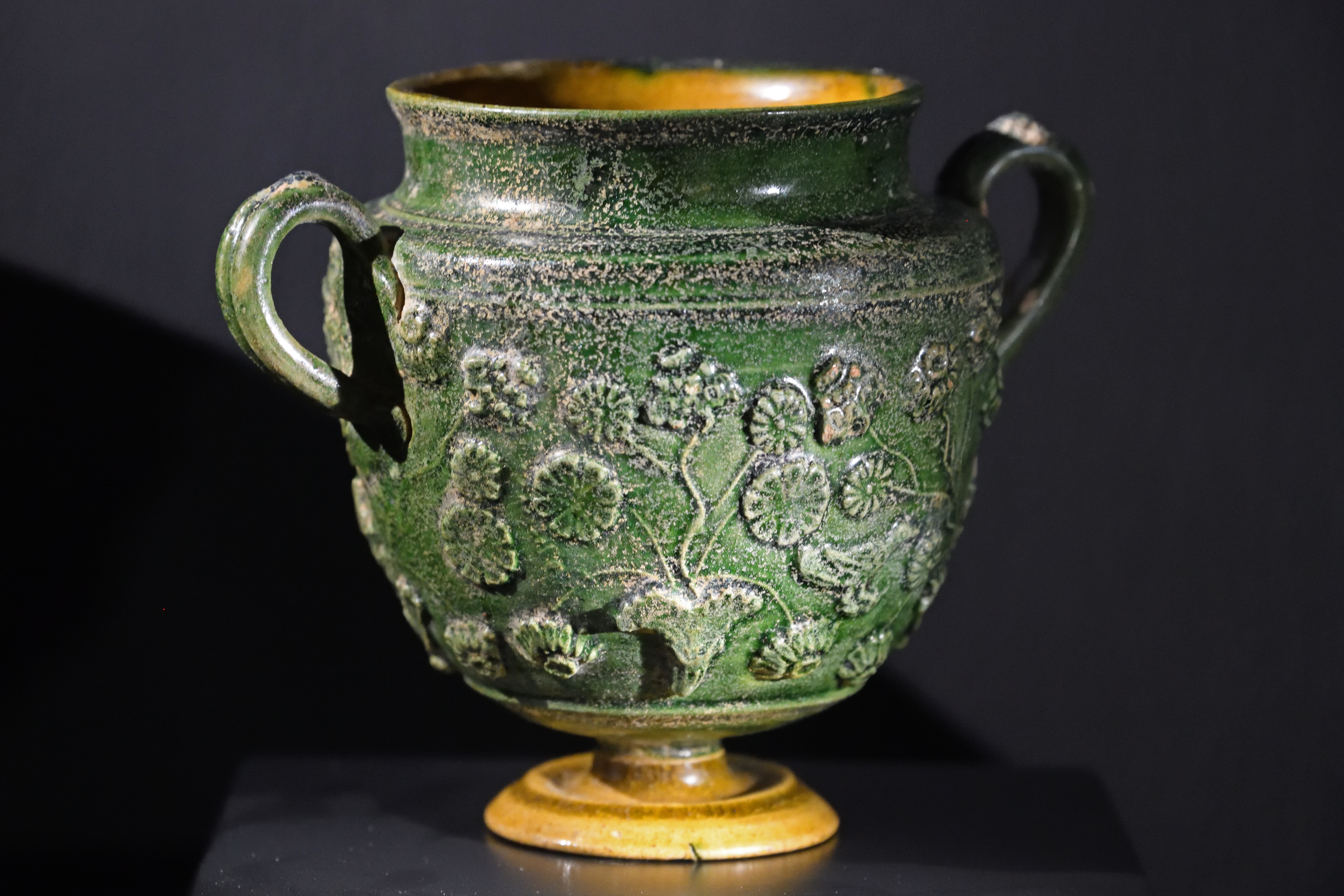
Roman two-handled glazed cup; 1st century BC-4th Century AD; glazed terracotta; Erimtan Archaeology and Arts Museum (Ankara, Turkey)

Rectangular wine cup (Zun) with a dragon; 1700s; grayish-white jade; overall: 14 cm; Cleveland Museum of Art

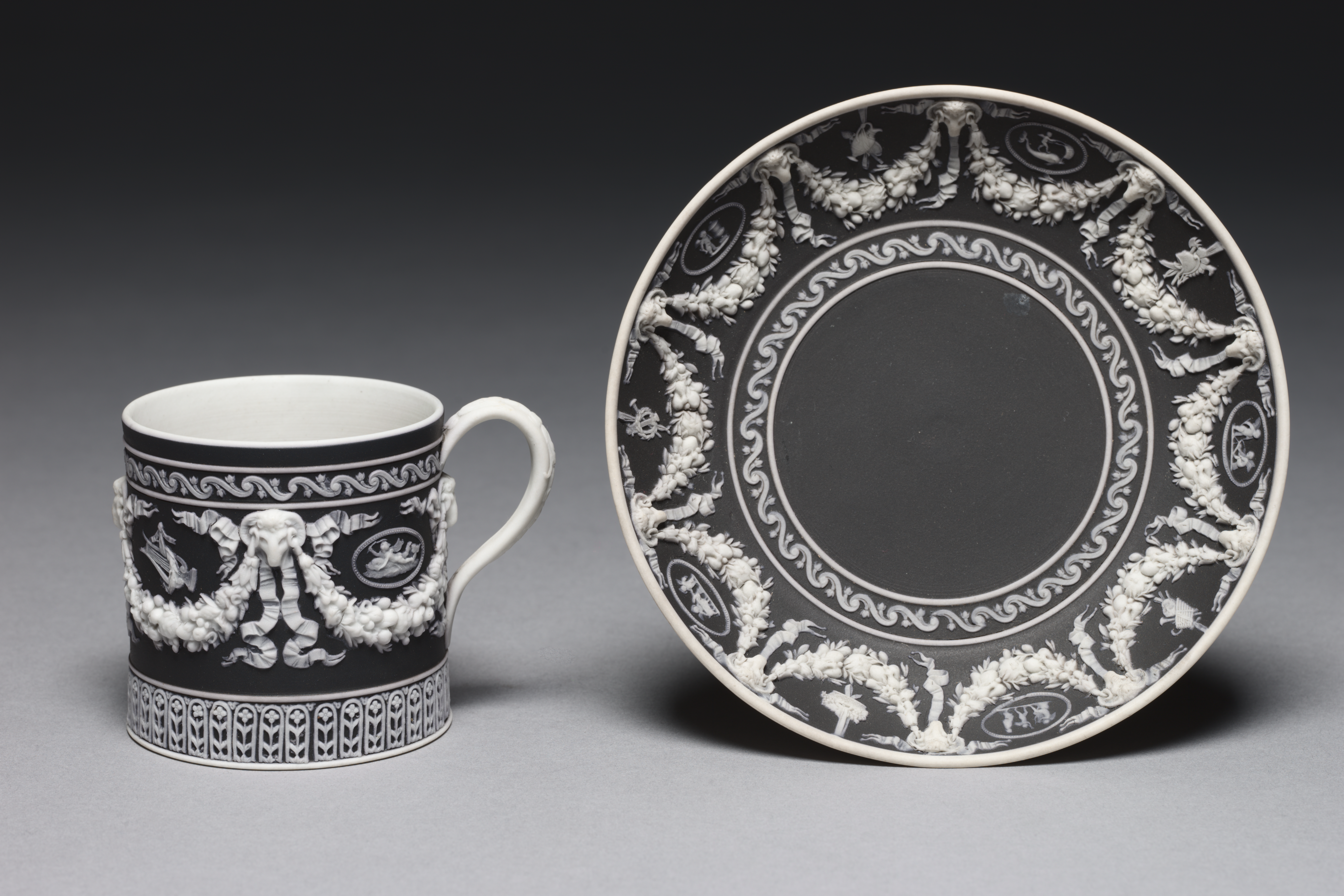
Neoclassical coffee cup with saucer; circa 1790; jasper ware with relief decoration; diameter: 13.6 cm; by the Wedgwood Factory (England); Cleveland Museum of Art

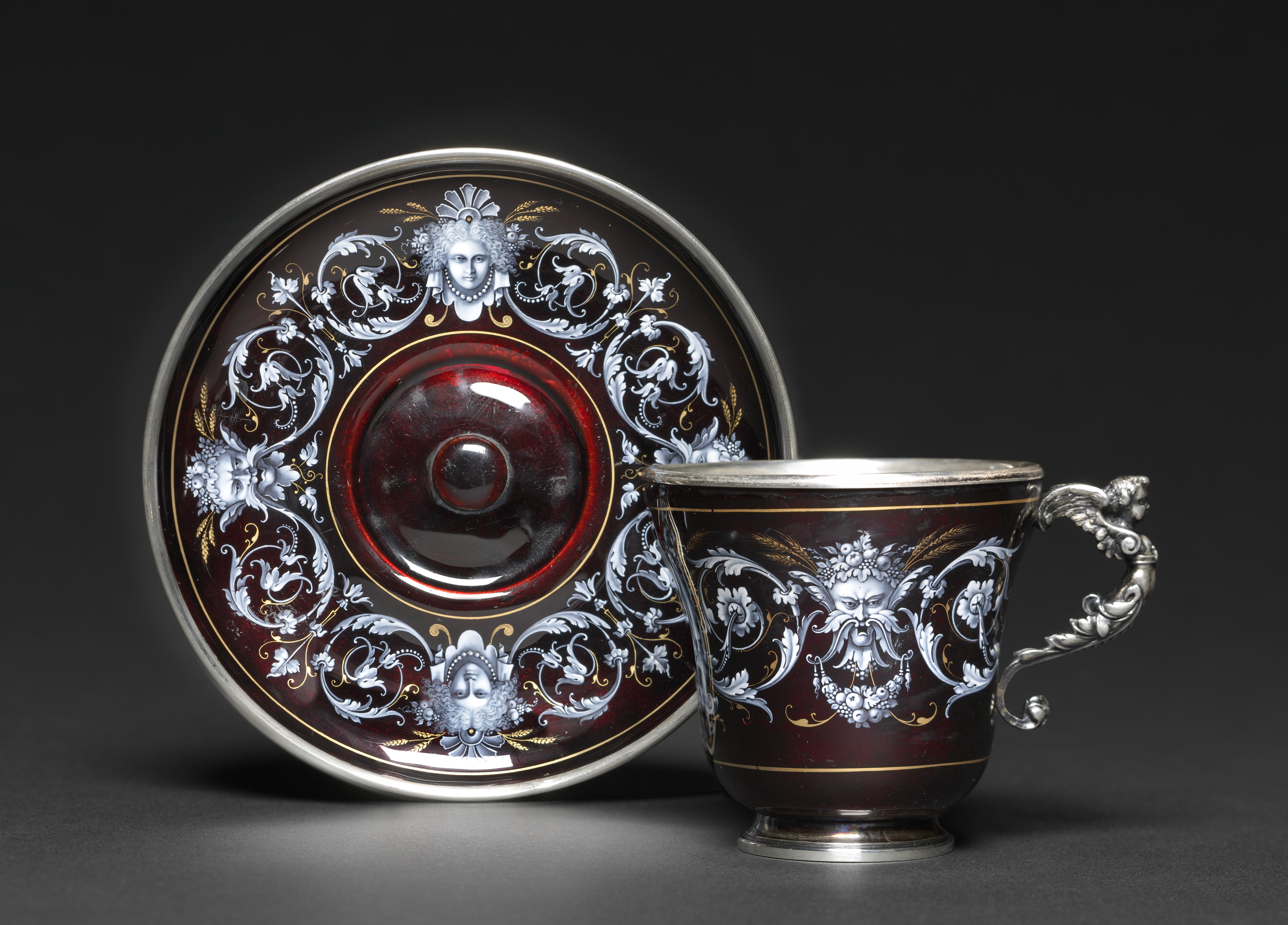
French cup and saucer, decorated with Renaissance ornaments; 1880–1900; enamel and silver; overall: 6.5 x 8.5 x 6.5 cm; Cleveland Museum of Art

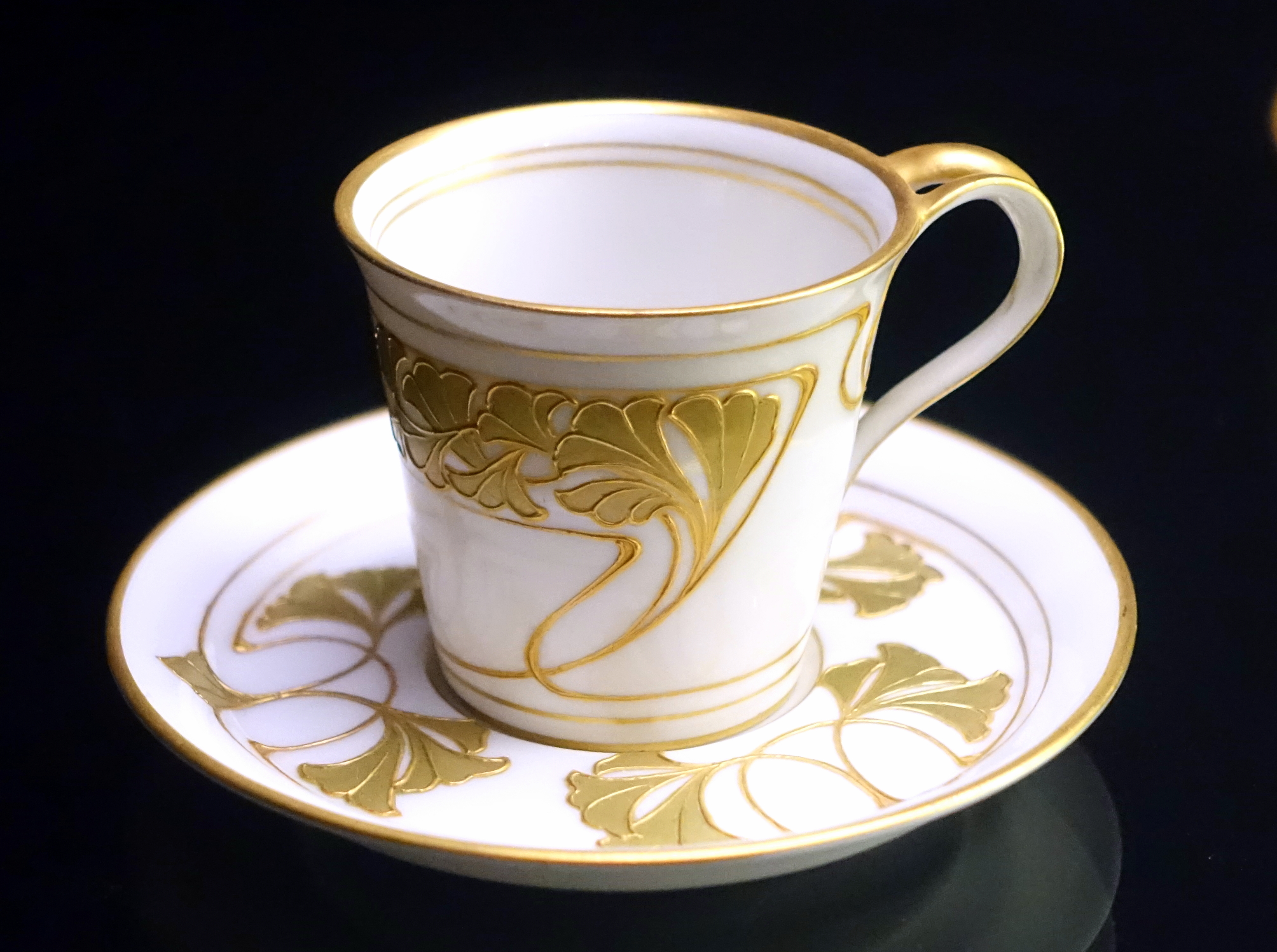
Art Nouveau cup; designed by Adolf Flad; 1902; porcelain; Bröhan Museum (Berlin, Germany)

== Sources ==
- Allan, Keith (2020). "On Cups". Dynamics of Language Changes. Singapore: Springer Singapore. pp. 125–137. doi:10.1007/978-981-15-6430-7_8. ISBN 978-981-15-6429-1.
- Burn, Lucilla, The British Museum Book of Greek and Roman Art, 1991, British Museum Press, ISBN 0714112976
- Hillier, Bevis, Pottery and Porcelain 1700-1914: England, Europe and North America (series The Social History of the Decorative Arts), 1968, Weidenfeld & Nicolson, ISBN 0297176684
- Kronenfeld, D. (1996). Plastic Glasses and Church Fathers: Semantic Extension From the Ethnoscience Tradition. Oxford Studies in Anthropological Linguistics. Oxford University Press. ISBN 978-0-19-535749-3.
- Rigby, Stephen Henry (2003). A Companion to Britain in the Later Middle Ages (Illustrated ed.). Wiley-Blackwell. ISBN 978-0-631-21785-5.
- Stock, Penelope F (January 24, 2008). "Polysemy" (PDF). Practical Lexicography. Oxford University Press. pp. 153–160. doi:10.1093/oso/9780199292332.003.0010. ISBN 978-0-19-929233-2.
- Wierzbicka, Anna (1984). "Cups and mugs: Lexicography and conceptual analysis". Australian Journal of Linguistics. 4 (2). Informa UK Limited: 205–255. doi:10.1080/07268608408599326. ISSN 0726-8602.
