= Kronkåsa =

Swedish drinking cup

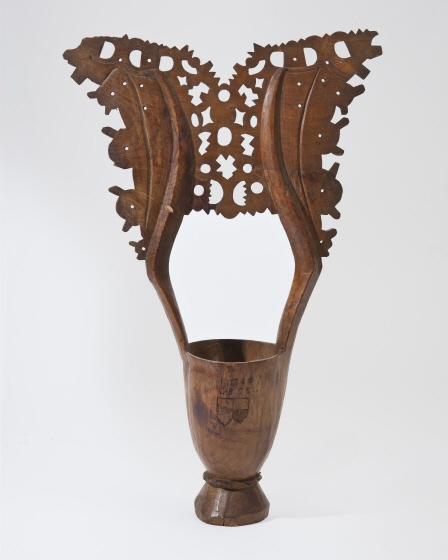
A kronkåsa that belonged to Gustaf Banér and Christina Sture (1589)

A kronkåsa (Swedish: crown cup, plural kronkåsor) is a form of elaborate drinking cup that was used during the Renaissance in Sweden.

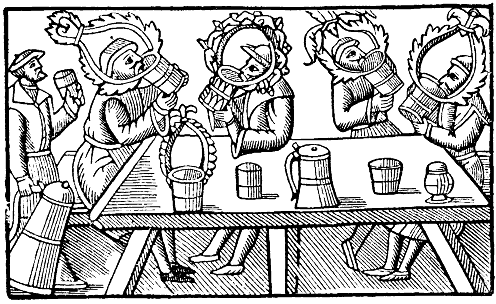
Depiction of drinking using kronkåsor, from the Historia de Gentibus Septentrionalibus by Olaus Magnus

A kronkåsa is a drinking vessel where the handles are exaggeratedly long and elaborate, thus forming a kind of crown above the cup, hence the name. The crown cups made during the Renaissance were carved from a single root of spruce trees. Later copies from the 19th century were made using other types of wood.

The drinking cups were probably used on special occasions where it was considered important to maintain significance of the family and its history.

== History ==
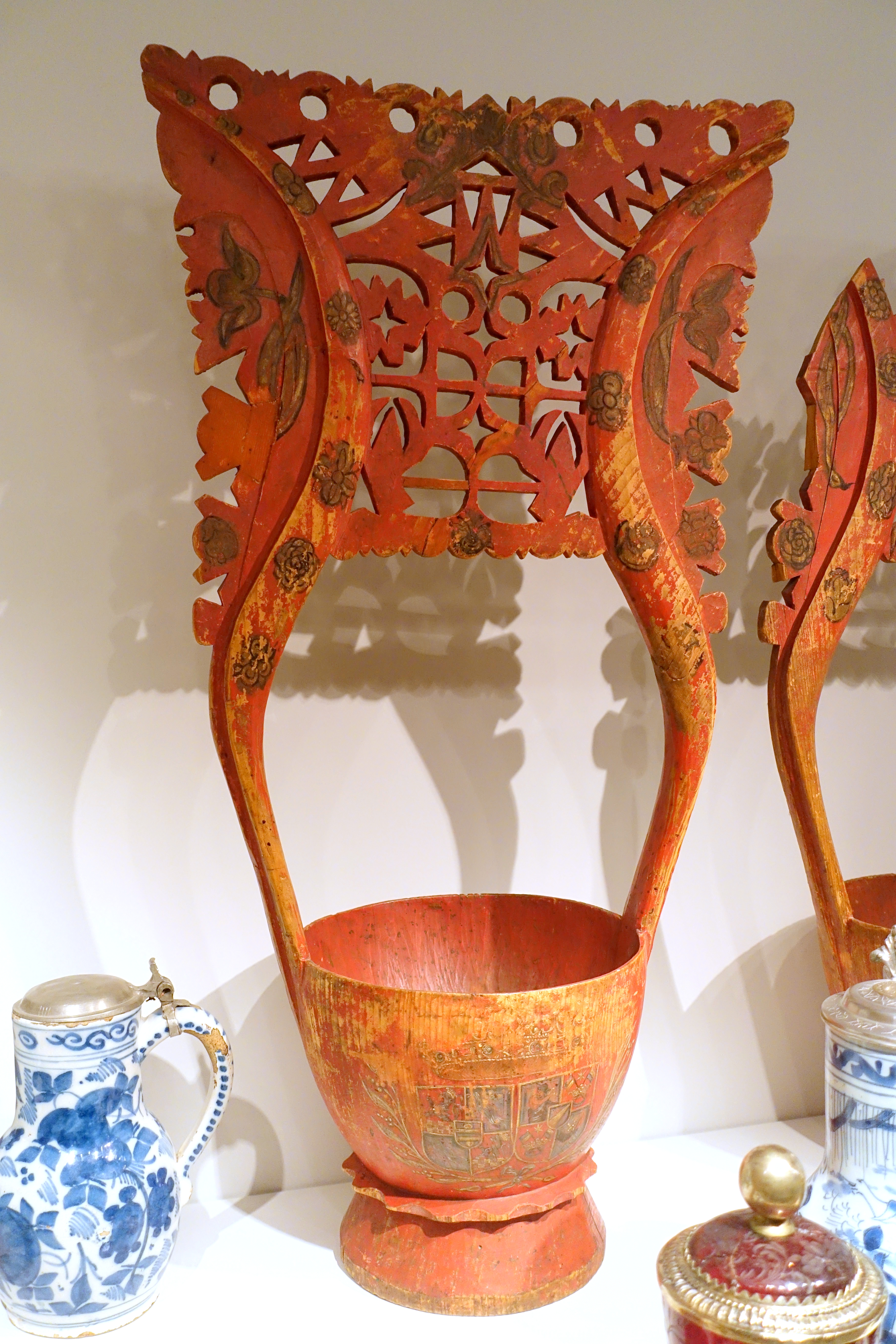
Example in spruce, for a Swedish wedding in 1681

Kronkåsor were used in Sweden during the Renaissance as a form of elaborate drinking vessel among the Swedish nobility. Although little is known of their origin, it has been suggested that they reflect an old tradition of elaborately carved wooden drinking vessels popular in Northern and Eastern Europe. The popularity of kronkåsor during the 16th century coincides with a breakthrough in the quality and popularity of wood carving as an art in general in Sweden. Magnificent kronkåsor have been commissioned during the reign of Gustav Vasa.

In Olaus Magnus's A Description of the Northern Peoples, he calls them "Finnish caps" and describes their use as a typically Finnish custom. Anna Hogenskild, who made several cups and gave them to close relatives, owned a family estate in Nynäs which was in the eastern part of the Swedish realm, in an area north of Åbo (Turku). Scandinavian map by Olaus Magnus depicts a kronkåsa precisely in this area.

About 20 kronkåsor survive to this day, most of them preserved in museums. A number of boxes of this type are preserved in Swedish museums and largely originate from noble families. The oldest dated one is in Museum of Gothenburg and is from 1526. Many of them are intimately connected to the Bielke family who played a big role in making new cups. When the Swedish National Heritage Board was created in 1630, its objective was to preserve ancient monuments and cultural heritage, including kronkåsor.

During the Romantic Nationalism period, copies of these cups were popular, often with leaf-sawed decorations.
