= Lotiform vessels (Metropolitan Museum of Art) =

Item collection

Lotiform Vessels
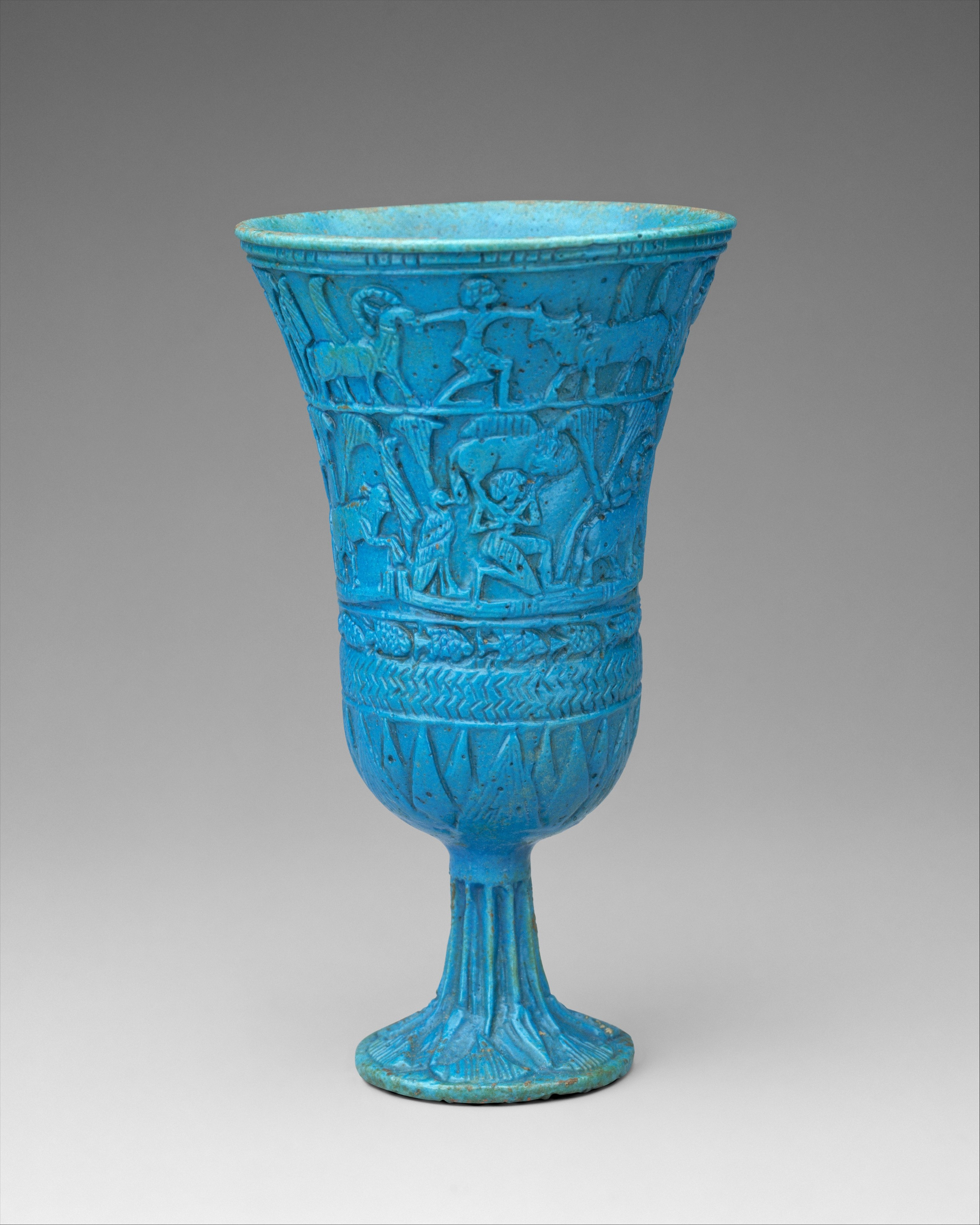
- The Lotiform Chalice, Metropolitan Museum of Art
- Year: c. B.C 1069 – 664
- Medium: Quartz and calcite lime based glaze on earthenware
- Location: Metropolitan Museum of Art

The Metropolitan Museum of Art has a number of blue faience vases and chalices from Ancient Egypt in its collection. The vessels, which range in condition from full works to fragments, are dated to the Third Intermediate Period of Egypt.

== Description ==
Egyptian faience pottery (as opposed to modern faience) was made from fired earthenware colored with a glaze. The art style was popular in the Third Intermediate Period (c. 1069 BC – c. 664 BC) of Egyptian history. Blue-green, the most popular color used on the earthenware, was achieved through the use of a quartz and calcite lime-based glaze. Egyptian potters crafted relief vases, chalices, and bowls. Many items depicted reeds, lotuses, rivers, aquatic animals, and people, likely due to the glaze's blue-green coloration being associated with water.

=== Lotiform Chalice ===
The Lotiform Chalice (c. 945–664 B.C.) is faience relief chalice. Images carved into the chalice depict fish, papyrus clumps, and lotus blooms. The vessel's images possibly portray legends surrounding the flooding of the Nile, an event that was of significant economic and spiritual importance to the ancient Egyptians.

=== Reconstructed lotiform chalice ===
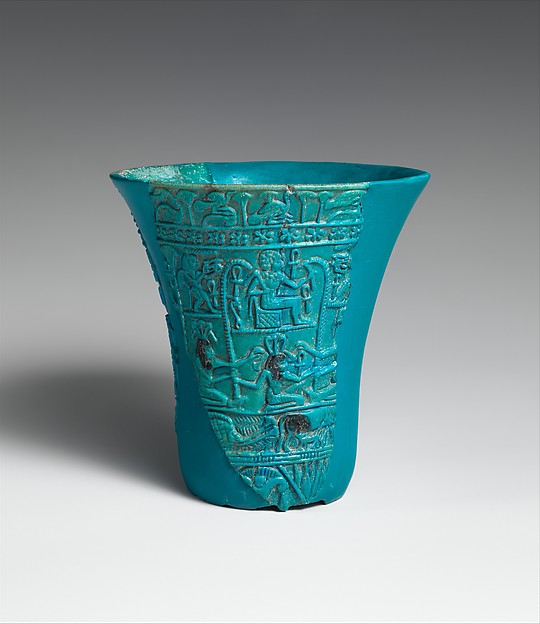
A lotiform chalice reconstructed from fragments of pottery

Pieced together with pottery fragments, a second lotiform chalice in the Metropolitan Museum of Art's collection depicts a scene in which the god Hapi presents a ruler of Egypt with palm ribs and a scepter. The gifts (which take the shape of ankhs) are intended to bestow good fortune and long life upon the recipient.

=== Fragments ===
The Metropolitan Museum of Art also maintains several fragments of Egyptian faience pottery dated between 945 and 712 B.C.

== Gallery ==
Various lotiform vessels in the collection of the Metropolitan Museum of Art

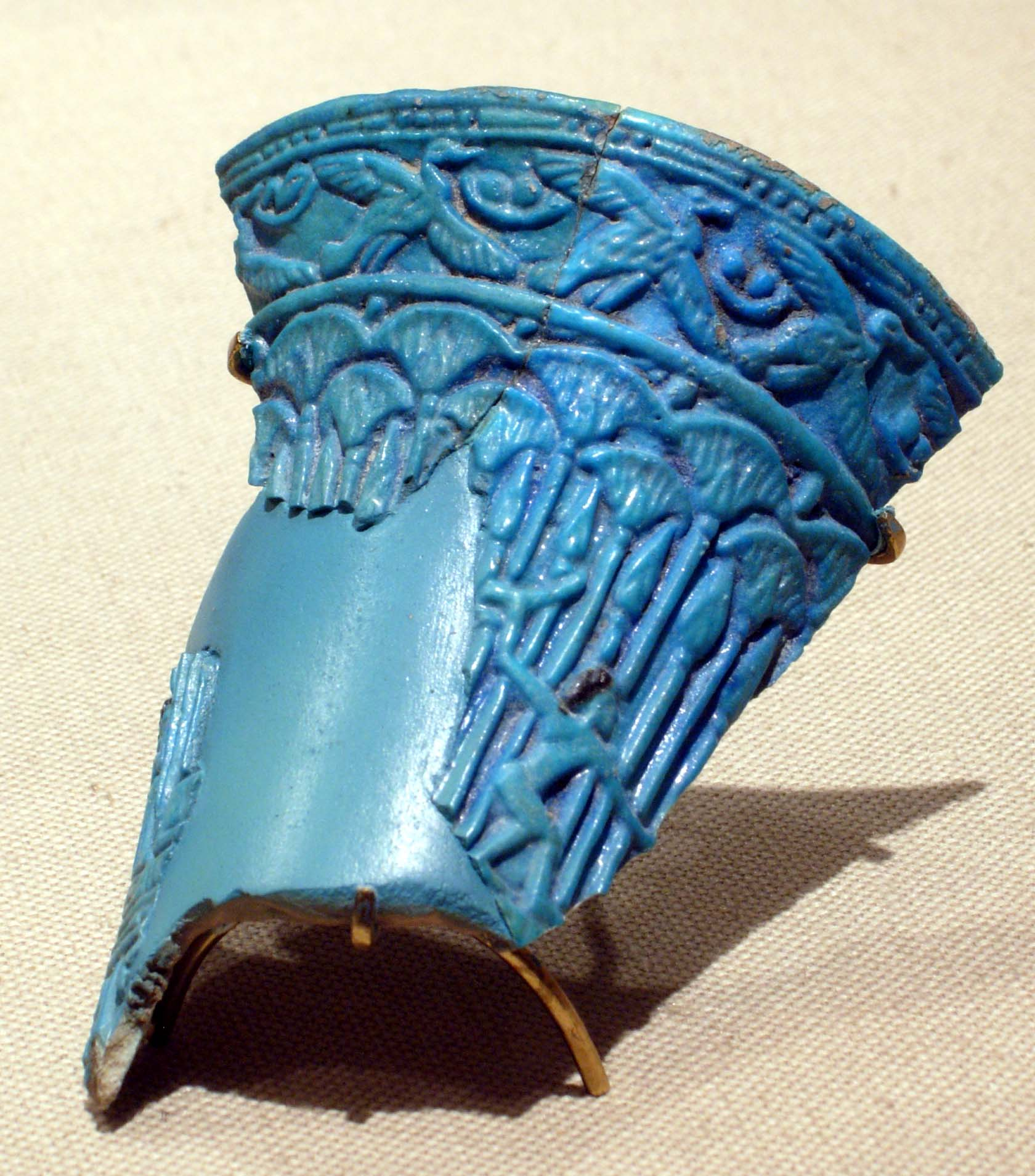
Chalice fragment, circa 1070–664 B.C.

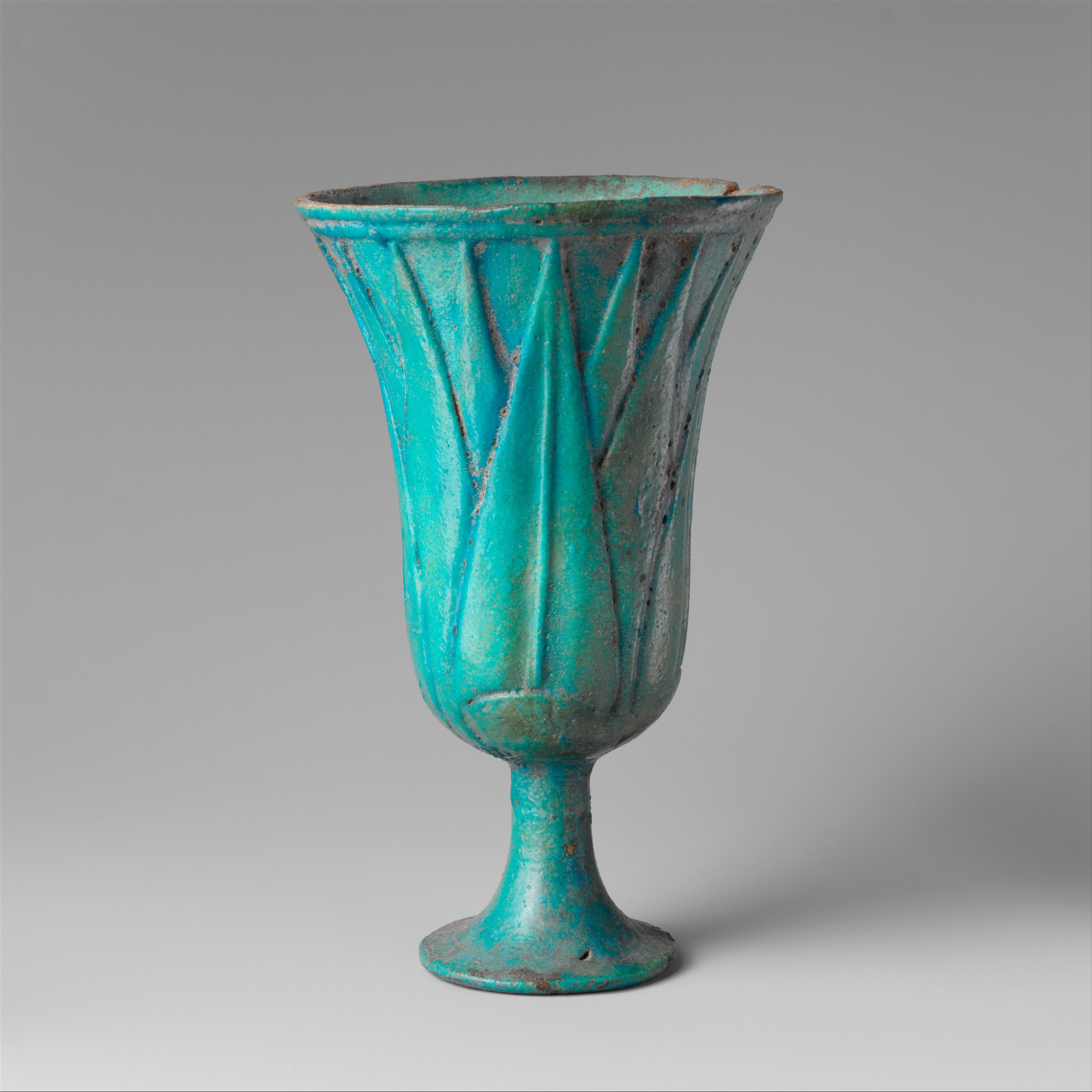
Cup, circa 1295–1185 B.C.

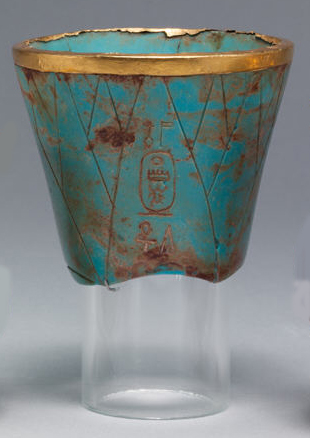
Cup, circa 1479–1425 B.C.

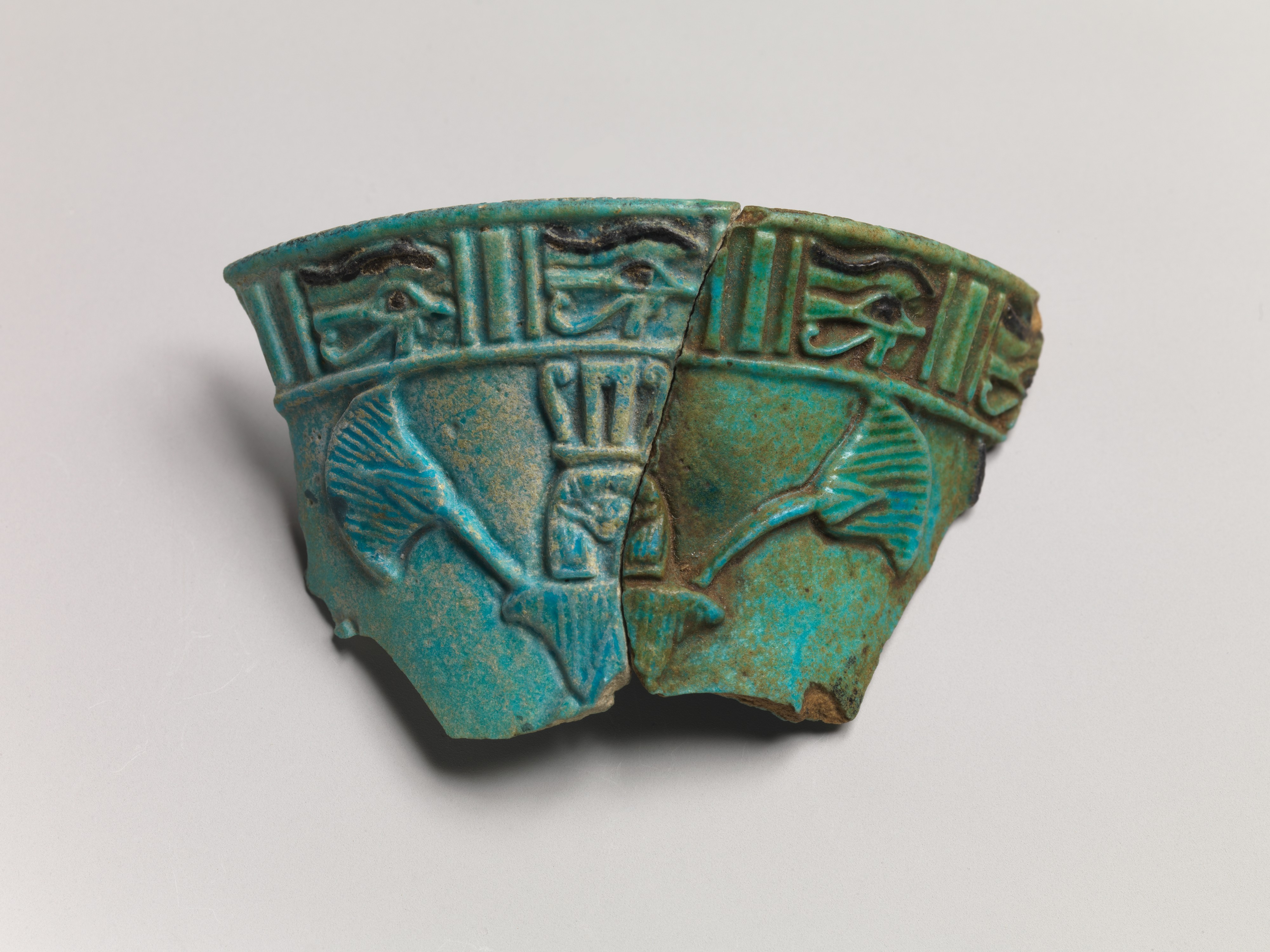
Relief chalice fragment, circa 1070–712 B.C.

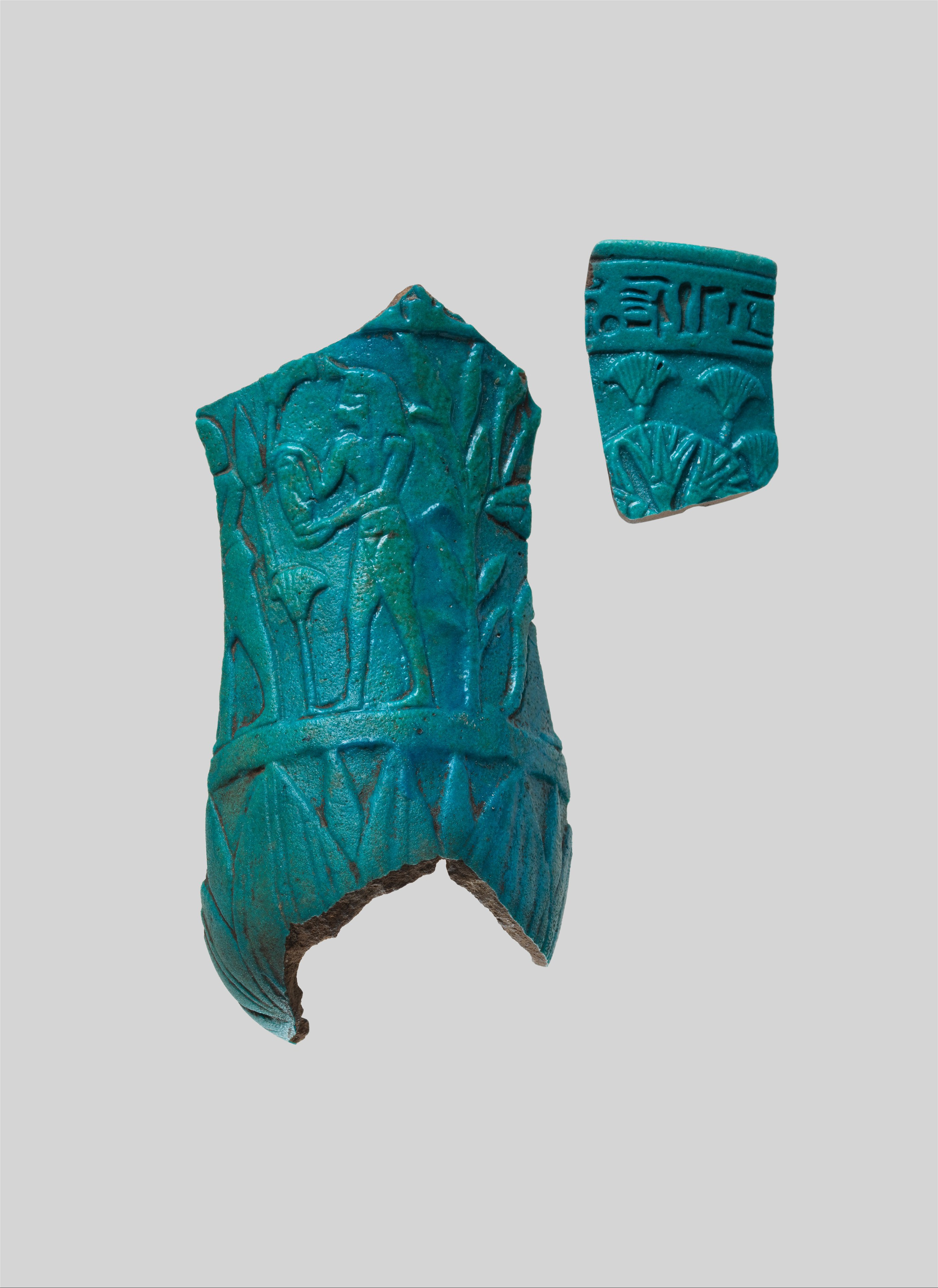
Relief chalice with inscription, circa 945–712 BC
