= Spa cup =

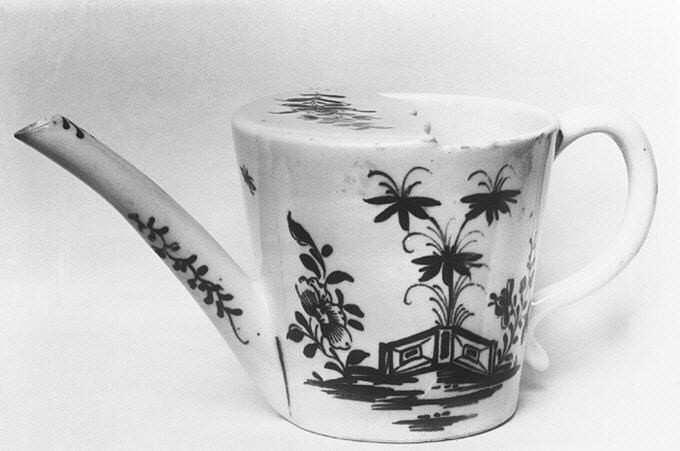
Spa cup form, with strainer at top, in Lowestoft porcelain, 1760s

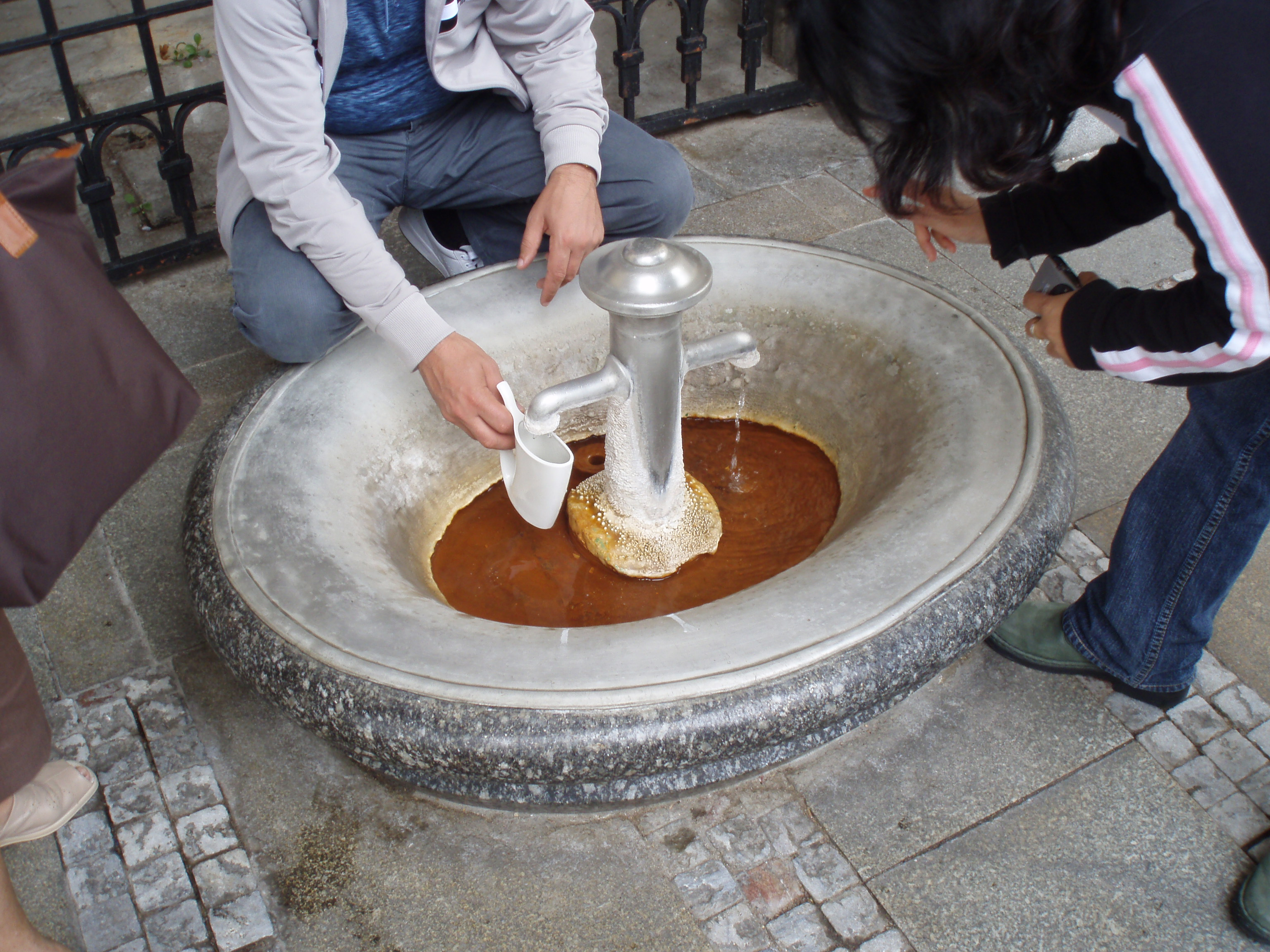
A man taking water with white porcelain cup, Skalní pramen, Karlovy Vary

Spa cup (in Czech: Lázeňský pohárek) is a special shape of porcelain cup, with a spout leading from low down in the body, so that the vessel looks like a cross between a cup and a teapot. They are used to drink mineral or thermal water directly from the spring. Typically, spa-goers put the spout to their mouths and drink from it.

According to the Czechs, spa cups were developed in north-west Bohemia in the spa region around the well known spas such as Karlovy Vary, Mariánské Lázně and Jáchymov. Originally people drank spa water using glasses. The development of spa cups started in the 17th century and went through a variety of materials, shapes and decorations. Many spa-cups look like tall teacups, with or without handles.

The shape is also suitable for infusions and tisanes with floating pieces, and may originate with such uses.
