= Compendium: The Best of Patrick Street =

Greatest hits album by Patrick Street
- Released: 2000
- Recorded: Landsdowne Studios (1986); Homestead Studios (1988); Windmill Lane Studios (1990); Windmill Lane Studios (1993); Mt. Hollywood Studios (1996); Soundmasters, Cork (1997); Live in Britain & Ireland (1998)
- Genre: Irish folk music
- Length: 1:04:40
- Label: Green Linnet Records
- Producer: Dónal Lunny; Gerry O'Beirne; Bill Whelan; Patrick Street

Patrick Street chronology
Live from Patrick Street (1999)	Compendium: The Best of Patrick Street (2000)	Street Life (2002)

Compendium: The Best of Patrick Street is the second compilation album by the Irish folk band Patrick Street, released in 2000 on the Green Linnet label.

== Recording ==
All but two tracks are re-releases from the following albums:

- Patrick Street (1986) – (three tracks: 3, 9, 13)
- No. 2 Patrick Street (1988) – (two tracks: 2, 8)
- Irish Times (1990) – (one track: 10)
- All in Good Time (1993) – (two tracks: 1, 12)
- Cornerboys (1996) – (one track: 4)
- Made in Cork (1997) – (one track: 6)
- Live from Patrick Street (1999) – (two tracks: 5, 14).

Two previously unreleased tracks were recorded live in Britain and Ireland, during November 1998 (tracks 7, 11).

Andy Irvine sings all seven songs compiled on this album.

== Track listing ==
1. "Walsh's Polkas" (Trad. Arr. Patrick Street) – (From the album All In Good Time, 1993) – 3:29
2. "Jenny Picking Cockles/An Gabhrán/Jack Keane's Reel" (Trad. Arr. Patrick Street) – (From the album No 2 Patrick Street, 1988) – 3:33
3. "The Dream" (Andy Irvine) / "Indiana" (song) (Andy Mitchell) – (From the album Patrick Street, 1986) – 6:58
4. "The White Pettycoat/The Kerry Jig/Katy is Waiting" (Trad. Arr. Patrick Street) – (From the album Cornerboys, 1996) – 4:37
5. "Stewball and the Monaghan Grey Mare" (song) (Trad. / Music & New lyrics: Andy Irvine) – (From the album Live from Patrick Street, 1999) – 4:20
6. "Rainbow 'Mid the Willows" (song) (Andy Irvine) Published by Andy Irvine – (From the album Made in Cork, 1997) – 5:33
7. "The Newmarket Polkas" (Trad. Arr. Patrick Street) – (Previously unreleased, 1998) – 3:38
8. "William Taylor" (song) (Trad. Arr. Patrick Street and Bill Whelan) – (From the album No 2 Patrick Street, 1988) – 3:05
9. "The Set"/"La Cardeuse" (Trad. Arr. Patrick Street) – (From the album Patrick Street, 1986) – 3:11
10. "Brackagh Hill" (song) (Andy Irvine) Published by Andy Irvine – (From the album Irish Times, 1990) – 5:47
11. "Killanin's Fancy/The Dash to Portobello/Anna Maculeen" (Trad. Arr. Patrick Street) – (A live version from 1998, first recorded on the album Cornerboys, 1996) – 5:11
12. "Lintheads:" – (From the album All In Good Time, 1993) – 7:41
  1. "The Pride Of The Springfield Road" (song) (Trad. Arr. Andy Irvine)
  2. "Lawrence Common" (instrumental) (Andy Irvine)
  3. "Goodbye Monday Blues" (song) (Andy Irvine and Si Kahn)
13. "Loftus Jones" (Trad. Arr. Patrick Street) – (From the album Patrick Street, 1986) – 3:31
14. "Music For A Found Harmonium" (Simon Jeffes/Penguin Café Ltd) – (From the album Live from Patrick Street, 1999) – 4:06

== Personnel ==
- Andy Irvine - vocals, mandolin, bouzouki, harmonica
- Kevin Burke - fiddle
- Jackie Daly - accordion
- Arty McGlynn - guitar
- Gerry O'Beirne - guitar
- Ged Foley - guitar
- James Kelly - fiddle
- Bill Whelan - keyboards
- Declan Masterson - uilleann pipes
