= The Best of Patrick Street =

Greatest hits album by Patrick Street
- Released: 16 June 1995
- Recorded: Landsdowne Studios (1986); Homestead Studios (1988); Windmill Lane Studios (1990/1993)
- Genre: Irish folk music.
- Length: 1:16:17
- Label: NECTAR / All tracks licensed courtesy of Topic Records Ltd.
- Producer: Dónal Lunny, Bill Whelan

Patrick Street chronology
All in Good Time (1993)	The Best of Patrick Street (1995)	Cornerboys (1996)

The Best of Patrick Street is the first compilation album by Patrick Street, released in 1995 on the NECTAR label.

All tracks are re-releases from the following albums:

- Patrick Street (1986) – (four tracks: 1, 5, 11, 15),
- No. 2 Patrick Street (1988) – (five tracks: 3, 7, 12, 14, 18),
- Irish Times (1990) – (four tracks: 4, 8, 10, 16) and
- All in Good Time (1993) – (five tracks: 2, 6, 9, 13, 17).

Andy Irvine sings all of the eight songs compiled on this album.

== Track listing ==
1. "Patrick Street"/"The Carraroe Jig" (Trad. Arr. Patrick Street) – (From the album Patrick Street, 1986) – 4:07
2. "Dennis Murphy's Reel"/"The Bag of Spuds"/"MacFarley's Reel" (Trad. Arr. Patrick Street and Bill Whelan) – (From the album All In Good Time, 1993) – 4:35
3. "Facing The Chair" (song) (Andy Irvine) Published by Andy Irvine – (From the album No 2 Patrick Street, 1988) – 5:16
4. "Brian O'Lynn"/"The Woods of Old Limerick" (Trad. Arr. Patrick Street) – (From the album Irish Times, 1990) – 3:19
5. "The Shores Of Lough Gowna"/"Contentment Is Wealth"/"Have A Drink On Me" (Trad. Arr. Patrick Street) – (From the album Patrick Street, 1986) – 5:02
6. "A Prince Among Men (Only A Miner)" (song) (Andy Irvine) Published by Andy Irvine – (From the album All In Good Time, 1993) – 4:26
7. "Carherlistrane Jig"/"Gallowglass Jig"/"Kanturk Jig" (Jackie Daly) Copyright Control – (From the album No 2 Patrick Street, 1988) – 3:32
8. "Forgotten Hero" (song) (Andy Irvine) Published by Andy Irvine – (From the album Irish Times, 1990) – 6:10
9. "Frank Quinn's Reel"/"Lad O'Beirne's"/"Murphy's Reel" (Trad. Arr. Patrick Street and Bill Whelan) – (From the album All In Good Time, 1993) – 4:06
10. "Music For A Found Harmonium" (S Jeffes) Published by Penguin Records – (From the album Irish Times, 1990) – 2:44
11. "The Holy Ground" (song) (Gerry O'Beirne) Published by Gerry O'Beirne – (From the album Patrick Street, 1986) – 5:39
12. "Hard By Seifin" (Roche Collection of Traditional Irish Music) / "Woodcock Hill" (Trad. Arr. Patrick Street) – (From the album No 2 Patrick Street, 1988) – 3:27
13. "The Mouth of the Tobique"/"Billy Wilson" (Trad. Arr. Patrick Street and Bill Whelan) – (From the album All In Good Time, 1993) – 3:02
14. "William Taylor" (song) (Trad. Arr. Patrick Street and Bill Whelan) – (From the album No 2 Patrick Street, 1988) – 3:08
15. "Mrs O'Sullivan's Jig"/"Caliope House" (Dave Richardson) Copyright Control – (From the album Patrick Street, 1986) – 3:33
16. "The Newmarket Polkas" ("Walshe's Polka"/"Dan Mac's Polka"/"Terry Teahan's Polka") (Trad. Arr. Patrick Street) – (From the album Irish Times, 1990) – 3:36
17. "Lintheads:" – (From the album All In Good Time, 1993) – 7:43
  1. "The Pride Of The Springfield Road" (song) (Trad. Arr. Andy Irvine)
  2. "Lawrence Common" (instrumental) (Andy Irvine)
  3. "Goodbye Monday Blues" (song) (Andy Irvine and Si Kahn)
18. "Sweeney's Reel" (Jackie Daly) Copyright Control – (From the album No 2 Patrick Street, 1988) – 2:52

== Personnel ==
- Andy Irvine - vocals, mandolin, bouzouki
- Kevin Burke - fiddle
- Jackie Daly - accordion
- Arty McGlynn - guitar
- James Kelly - fiddle
- Bill Whelan - keyboards
- Declan Masterson - uilleann pipes
- Gerry O'Beirne - guitar
