= Live from Patrick Street =

Live album by Patrick Street
- Released: 1999
- Recorded: November 1998, while on tour in Britain & Ireland
- Genre: Irish folk music
- Length: 50:52
- Label: Green Linnet Records
- Producer: Patrick Street

Patrick Street chronology
Made in Cork (1997)	Live from Patrick Street (1999)	Compendium: The Best of Patrick Street (2000)

Professional ratings
Review scores
Source	Rating
Allmusic	4/5 stars
Discogs	4.5/5 stars

Live from Patrick Street is the seventh album–recorded live–by the Irish folk band Patrick Street, released in 1999 on Green Linnet Records.

== Recording ==
It was recorded in November 1998 while on tour in Britain and Ireland. It was produced by the band, engineered by Steve Rusby, Andy Seward and Ray Williams, and mixed by Ged Foley and Bernie Nau at Athens Music Lab in Athens, Ohio.

Seven of the twelve tracks were never recorded before by Patrick Street; the remaining five tracks were first recorded for the following studio albums:

- Patrick Street (1986) – (track 11),
- No. 2 Patrick Street (1988) – (tracks 1 and 3),
- Irish Times (1990) – (track 10),
- Made in Cork (1997) – (track 5).

== Track listing ==
1. "McKenna's Jigs" (Traditional; arranged by Patrick Street) – 3:33
2. "The Raheen Medley" (Traditional; arranged by Patrick Street) – 4:32
3. "Braes of Moneymore" (song) (words: Traditional; music: Patrick Street, new lyrics: Andy Irvine) – 4:00
4. "My Son In Amerikay" (song) (Traditional; arranged by Patrick Street) – 3:09
5. "Bring Back The Child"/"Páidín O'Rafferty" (double jigs) (Traditional; arranged by Patrick Street) – 3:43
6. "Wild Rover No More" (song) (Traditional; arranged by Patrick Street) – 5:08
7. "Unnamed Slide"/"Johnny O'Leary's Slide"/"Micho Russell's Slide" (Traditional; arranged by Patrick Street) – 3:38
8. "Jack The Bridge"/"Cul Aodh Polka"/"The Salmon Tailing Up The River" (Traditional; arranged by Patrick Street) – 3:37
9. "Stewball and the Monaghan Grey Mare" (song) (Traditional; music & new lyrics: Andy Irvine) – 4:09
10. "Music For A Found Harmonium" (Simon Jeffes) – 3:52
11. "The Holy Ground" (song) (Gerry O'Beirne) – 6:09
12. "McDermott's Reel"/"The Plough And The Stars"/"Miss McLeod's Reel" (Traditional; arranged by Patrick Street) – 5:22

== Personnel ==
- Andy Irvine - vocals, mandolin, bouzouki, harmonica, hurdy-gurdy
- Kevin Burke - fiddle
- Jackie Daly - accordion
- Ged Foley - guitar, fiddle
