= Paddy Fahey =

Irish musician (1916–2019)

Paddy Fahey (or Fahy, 17 August 1916 – 31 May 2019) was an Irish composer and fiddler who was considered one of the finest living composers of tunes that are in the style of traditional Irish music.

Fahey was born 17 August 1916 in Kilconnell East Galway to John (Jack) Fahey and Julia Fahey (née Wolly). His genre is often referred to as "Draíocht". His music has been recorded by many of the finest traditional Irish musicians including Martin Hayes, Planxty, John Carty and Kevin Burke. In recent years, a few recordings featured Fahey's music prominently including recordings by Liz and Yvonne Kane and Breda Keville.

Fahey did not make a song book nor a commercial recording. There are some privately made recordings of Fahey which have been distributed among musicians since the 1970s. Transcriptions of his tunes are found in many tune collections and on Internet resources such as www.thesession.org.

Fahey never gave his music names. They tend to be simply named "Paddy Fahey's Reel No.1", "Paddy Fahey's Jig No.2", etc. His known compositions number around 60 tunes, all of which are either jigs, reels or hornpipes.

In 2001 Fahey was named Composer of The Year by Irish Language TV station TG4 at their annual award ceremony 'Gradam Ceoil TG4'. This broadcast had a live concert appearing alongside fellow fiddler Paddy Canny, harpist Máire Ní Chathasaigh, the band Altan and others.

He died in May 2019 at the age of 102.

== See also ==
- Vallely, Fintan (ed.), The Companion to Traditional Irish Music. Cork University Press, Cork, 1999
- Holohan, Maria. The Tune Compositions of Paddy Fahey. MA Thesis, University of Limerick, 1995
