= Compendium (disambiguation) =

Compendium may refer to:

- Compendium, a Wikipedia article defining the word 'compendium'.
- Compendium Books, a London bookstore specialising in experimental literary and theoretical publications.
- Compendium of Chemical Terminology, a book published by the International Union of Pure and Applied Chemistry (IUPAC).
- Compendium Maleficarum, a witch-hunter's manual written in Latin by Francesco Maria Guazzo, and published in Milan, Italy in 1608.
- Compendium of Materia Medica, a Chinese medical book written by Li Shizhen during the Ming Dynasty.
- Compendium of postage stamp issuers (F), a collection of entries about stamp issuers beginning with the letter 'F'.
- Compendium of postage stamp issuers (J), a collection of entries about stamp issuers beginning with the letter 'J'.
- Compendium of the Catechism of the Catholic Church, a catechism promulgated for the Catholic Church by Pope John Paul II in 1992.
- Compendium (software), a computer program and social science tool that facilitates the mapping and management of ideas and arguments.
- Compendium: The Best of Patrick Street, a year 2000 compilation album by the Irish folk band Patrick Street.
