= Zoë Conway =

- Born: 1981 (age 44–45); Dundalk, Ireland
- Genre: Traditional Irish music
- Occupation: Musician
- Instrument: Fiddle
- Website: https://zoeconway.com/

Zoë Conway is an Irish violinist, trained in both classical music and traditional fiddle-playing. She is married to fellow Irish traditional musician John McIntyre.

== Early life ==
Born in Dundalk in 1981, attended St Louis Secondary School, Dundalk, where she served as the leader of the Cross Border Orchestra of Ireland.

She received a Diploma in Music Theory from the Dublin Conservatory of Music and Drama and Performance Diploma in 2003 from the ABSRM.

== Career ==
She has performed with the RTE Concert Orchestra, the Irish Chamber Orchestra and as a member of Bill Whelan's "Riverdance".

Alongside traditional musicians Donal Lunny and Mairtin O'Connor, she is a member of the group ZoDoMo.

Conway has released 2 solo albums and 2 albums with her husband John with whom she also organises the Féile na Tána traditional music festival.

In 2019 she was awarded the Best Folk Instrumentalist prize at the RTÉ Radio 1 Folk Awards.

== Discography ==
- Zoë Conway (2002)
- The Horses Tail (2006)
- Go Mairir I Bhfad (2012)
- Zoë Conway and John McIntyre Live In Concert (2017)

=== Allt ===
- Allt (2018 - with Éamon Doorley, Julie Fowlis and John McIntyre)
- Allt: Volume II Cuimhne (2024 - with Éamon Doorley, Julie Fowlis and John McIntyre)
