= James W. Flannery =

Academic and theatrical producer (born 1936)

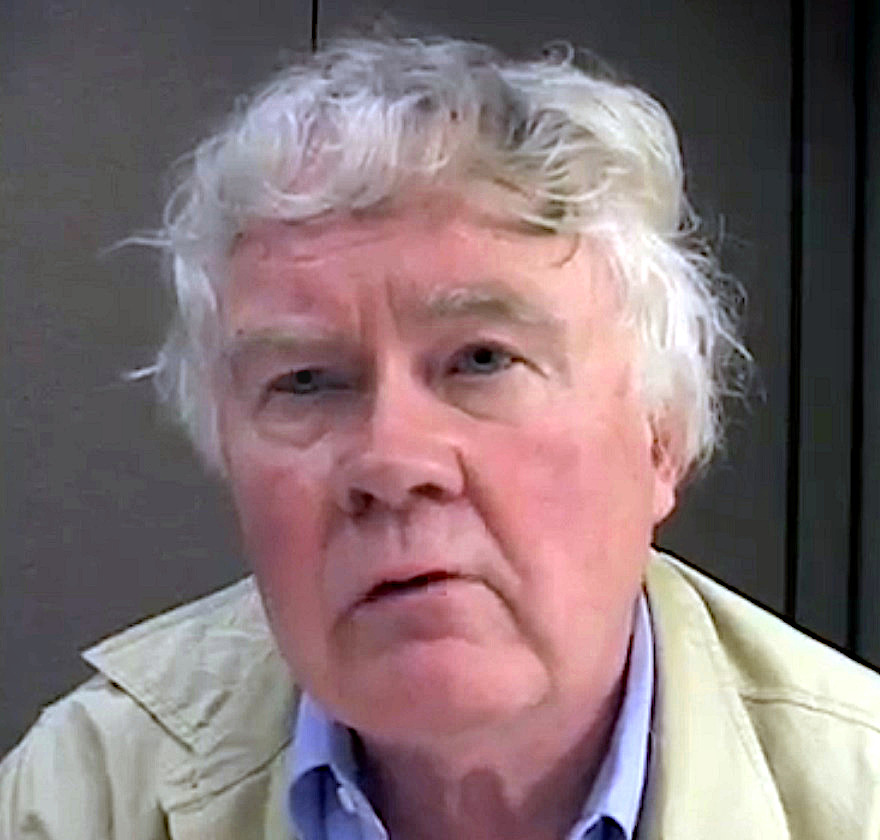
James Flannery 2004

James W. Flannery (born Nov 8, 1936 in Hartford, CT) is a producer, stage director, singer, scholar, critic and Professor Emeritus at Emory College of Arts and Sciences in Atlanta. He is a specialist in the dramatic work of W.B. Yeats and is one of the leading interpreters of the art songs of Thomas Moore.

== Early life ==
In 1958 Flannery completed his undergraduate studies in music and English at Trinity College located in Hartford, CT, graduating Phi Beta Kappa. He pursued a Master of Fine Arts in acting and directing at the Yale School of Drama, graduating in 1961. He then obtained a Doctorate in English and Anglo-Irish Literature from Trinity College Dublin in 1970.

== Career ==
Between 1989 and 1993, Flannery held the position of executive director at the famous Abbey Theatre in Dublin, where he organized the Yeats International Theatre Festival. During each of the five years, he produced three plays by Yeats, accompanied by original music composed by Bill Whelan, who later achieved success as the composer of Riverdance. In his 2022 autobiography, The Road To Riverdance, Whelan mentions that "some members of the company found Flannery's directorial style curious, but nobody could deny his deep knowledge (and zeal) for Yeats as a playwright."

In 1988 Flannery founded the W.B. Yeats Foundation at Emory University. He has garnered critical acclaim for his staging and directing of the plays of Yeats in America, Canada and Ireland.

Flannery maintains that Yeats' plays sought to inspire people to live "creative and abundant lives".

He is a talented tenor and is one of the foremost interpreters of the art songs of Thomas Moore and in 1997 published a book and recording titled, Dear Harp of My Country: The Irish Melodies of Thomas Moore.

He was a visiting professor at the University of Ulster, Northern Ireland in 2000 and 2001.

In 2010 he was named an International Associate Artist at the Abbey Theatre.

== Personal life ==
He married Ildiko Elizabeth Pokoly in 1964.

== Honors ==
He has been Winship Professor Emeritus of the Arts and Humanities at Emory University Emeritus College since 2016. He received honorary doctorates from Trinity College (Hartford) in 1991 and from the University of Ulster (Derry) in 2001. In 2010 he was honored as a visiting professor at the University College, Dublin.

In 2012 he won the Southeastern Emmy Award for Outstanding Achievement in Arts and Entertainment for his film A Southern Celtic Christmas Concert on PBS. It has since been broadcast regularly as a Christmas special on PBS stations across the country. In the same year, for his many contributions to the Irish-American community, he was named the “Irishman of the Year” by the Hibernian Benevolent Society in Atlanta.

In 2020 he got a 2020 Presidential Distinguished Service Awards from the Global Irish Network.

Irish America Magazine has listed him among the one hundred most distinguished Irish-Americans five times.

== Books ==
- 1997: Dear Harp of My Country: The Irish Melodies of Thomas Moore [book and recording]
- 1976: W. B. Yeats and the Idea of a Theatre: The Early Abbey Theatre in Theory and in Practice
- 1970: Miss Horniman and the Abbey Theatre
