= On the Fly (album) =

Studio album by Patrick Street
- Released: October 2007
- Recorded: Scalp, County Clare, Ireland; Weir Hall, Larkin Abbot, Surrey, England
- Genre: Irish folk music
- Length: 46:51
- Label: Loftus Music
- Producers: Ged Foley & Patrick Street

Patrick Street chronology
Street Life (2002)	On the Fly (2007)

On the Fly is the ninth album (eighth studio) by the Irish folk band Patrick Street, released in 2007 on Loftus Music.

The regular band members (Andy Irvine, Kevin Burke, Jackie Daly, Ged Foley) were joined by new member John Carty (fiddle, flute, banjo), and by guest musician Brendan Hearty (harmonium). Daly left the band after this recording.

== Recording and production ==
The album was arranged by Patrick Street, produced by Ged Foley and Patrick Street, engineered by Brendan Hearty and Ged Foley, and recorded at the following studios:

- Scalp, County Clare, Ireland;
- Weir Hall, Larkin Abbot Surrey, England;
- Mixed by Paul Gurney at Real World Studios, Clonrollagh, Longford, Ireland.

== Critical reception ==
Professional ratings
Review scores
Source	Rating
Allmusic	4/5 stars
Amazon	5/5 stars
Discogs	4/5 stars

On the Fly received positive reviews from folk music critics.

In his review for fRoots (Jan/Feb 2008), Colin Irwin stated:

- "It's over two decades since Patrick Street first sauntered among us, liberally dispensing virtuosity, taste and exquisite tunes and it's gratifying to report that they're still at it – and this latest foray into the sunlight finds them as immaculate as ever."
- "All the vocal tracks slot in neatly around jigs, reels, polkas and hornpipes that blend immaculately together with the help of a relaxed production that creates the impression of a bunch of mates sitting around in the kitchen making sweet, sweet music."

In Journal of Music (1 March 2008), Rory McCabe said:

- "‘On the fly’ usually denotes hurriedness, a quick-fix in a situation where time is limited. However, this On the Fly does not betray anything of moves made in-flight or constrained by time. On this, the eighth studio album from Patrick Street, the music is measured out in a space which flows around, above and in-between the 47 minutes it takes to play through the twelve tracks."
- "Overall, the production creates a live feel. The studio is absent in that you only ever hear four musicians, albeit in an ideally balanced setting: it is a document of things as they are rather than a fiction created in the studio or on stage."
- "Within Patrick Street is the present place of Irish traditional music as it is in the flesh; this music could happen in your house."

In Irish Music Review (5 March 2008), Geoff Wallis added:

- "There’s a wide mix of various dance tunes (three sets of reels, (…), plus hornpipes, jigs and slip jigs, as well as a set of polkas with Jackie Daly’s box to the fore)."
- "Indeed there can have been no more joyous sound on a recent recording than the sheer swing and sway of the twin fiddles on Martin Wynne’s."
- "As has become a matter of course, but really needs reiteration, there are few singers in the English-speaking world able to tap so fundamentally into the wellsprings of a song than Andy."
- "Ever enthralling, On the Fly is an essential purchase."

In his review for Allmusic, Chris Nickson concluded:

- "Patrick Street albums don't come along every day, or even every year. The musicians are certainly the cream of the crop, with a long pedigree between them, as well as great skill and knowledge of the tradition."
- "The vast majority of the music is from the deep tradition, plus one each by John Carty and Kevin Burke, and the playing, as should be expected, is majestic throughout. The band gives a stately quality to Irish music, rather than the raucous session-type feel injected by so many groups, and with it comes a strong dignity."
- "As always, this Patrick Street album is worth the wait."

== Track listing ==
1. "Na Ceannabháin Bhána" ("The Little Fair Canavans")/"Páidin O Raifeartaigh" (slip jigs)
  (Trad., Arr. Patrick Street) – 2:21
2. "Martin Wynne's"/"Jackie Coleman's"/"Malynn's Fancy" (reels) (Trad., Arr. Patrick Street) – 3:04
3. "Sergeant Small" (song) (Words: Terry Boylan/Music: Tex Morton/Arr.: Brad Tate, Andy Irvine) – 4:12
4. "Happy to Meet Sorry to Part"/"Old Apples in Winter"/"Cherish the Ladies" (jigs) (Trad., Arr. Patrick Street) – 3:41
5. "Seanamhac Tube Station" (air/jig) (John Carty) – 4:47
6. "The Rich Irish Lady" (song) (Trad., Arr. Andy Irvine) – 5:07
7. "Down the Broom"/"The Gatehouse Maid"/"Mulvihill's" (reels) (Trad., Arr. Patrick Street) – 3:29
8. "The Galway Shawl" (song) (Trad., Arr. Ged Foley) – 4:59
9. "The Long Acre" (Kevin Burke)/"Cuz Teahan's" (Terence Teahan) (hornpipes) – 4:28
10. "Erin Go Bragh" (song) (Trad., Arr. Andy Irvine) – 4:08
11. "The Return of Spring"/"The Mountain Path" (polkas) (Trad. Arr. Patrick Street) – 2:58
12. "The Boys of Malin"/"John Stenson's Nos 1 & 2" (Trad./John Stenson/Arr. Patrick Street) (reels) – 3:37

== Personnel ==
- Andy Irvine - vocals, mandolin, bouzouki, harmonica
- Kevin Burke - fiddle
- Jackie Daly - accordion – tracks 11 and 12
- Ged Foley - vocals, guitar
- John Carty - fiddle, flute, banjo
- Brendan Hearty - harmonium – track 11
