= Hernon =

Hernon is a surname of Irish origin. Notable people with the surname include:

- Jimmy Hernon (1924–2009), Scottish footballer
- Marcus Hernon (born 1959), Irish flute player
- Tom Hernon (1866–1902), American baseball player

== See also ==
- Herron (name)
