= Street Life (Patrick Street album) =

Studio album by Patrick Street
- Released: 2002
- Recorded: Peach Fork Studios, Pomeroy, OH; Éiníní Studio, Naas, County Kildare; Navessa Studios, Saugerties, NY; Cal Scott Music, Tigard, OR
- Genre: Irish folk music
- Length: 45:36
- Label: Green Linnet / Topic Records
- Producers: Ged Foley & Patrick Street

Patrick Street chronology
Live from Patrick Street (1999)	Street Life (2002)	On the Fly (2007)

Street Life is the eighth album by the Irish folk band Patrick Street, released in 2002 on Green Linnet.

== Recording and production ==
It was produced by Ged Foley and Patrick Street, and recorded at the following studios:

- Peach Fork Studios, Pomeroy, Ohio – engineered by Bernie Nau;
- Éiníní Studio, Naas, County Kildare – engineered by Steve Cooney;
- Navessa Studios, Saugerties, New York – engineered by Chris Anderson;
- Cal Scott Music, Tigard, Oregon – engineered by Cal Scott.

The regular band members (Andy Irvine, Kevin Burke, Jackie Daly, Ged Foley) were joined by Steve Cooney (percussion), Gay Dalzell (harmony vocals), Matt McElroy (banjo), Bruce Molsky (fiddle), Bernie Nau (piano) and Cal Scott (alto horn & cornet). The album was arranged by Patrick Street, except for brass arrangements by Cal Scott.

== Critical reception ==
Professional ratings
Review scores
Source	Rating
Allmusic	3/5 stars
Amazon	5/5 stars
Discogs	4/5 stars

Street Life received positive reviews from folk music critics.

In Green Man Review, Pat Simmonds said the following:

- "A cursory glance through the running order reveals a list of tunes common enough to the tradition, yet typically for Patrick Street the versions are lesser known and arranged with a beautiful easygoing feel which gives them both a sense of familiarity and a new breath of life."
- "This album seems almost irrelevant given the modern Celticisms of the brave new wave but these old hands weave through a variety of styles with assurity and utter authority."
- "The individual maturity of each player shines through clearly as does the sophistication of the arrangements. Ultimately, nothing gets in the way of the music. There isn't a note out of place and the pacing of the tunes comes like a breath of fresh air."
- "The production qualities give a warm and personal feel to the music which result in a very satisfying listening experience."

In a review for Roots World, Jamie O'Brien stated:

- "The 10 tracks are evenly split between songs and instrumentals; and the mix in material - traditional and contemporary, well-known and lesser-heard - is also well-balanced."
- "Patrick Street provides an instrumental cross-section of rhythms. From the opening set of jigs, through a set of reels, then later, hornpipes until the band hits a set of Kerry slides and polkas before ending the album with a jig and pair of reels."
- "The arrangements have a diversity that allows the individual musicianship to come through, yet still maintain a distinctive group sound. The production, while clean and crisp, is warm and mellow."
- "On the one hand, there is no album by Patrick Street that I don't like. On the other, I tend to play the earlier ones much more frequently than the later releases. Street Life heralds a change. Time will tell, but I think they've possibly released a classic with this one."

In his review for Rambles, Nicky Rossiter added that:

- "The wide appeal of the group may be gathered from their travels. This particular CD was recorded in Ohio, Kildare, New York and Oregon. It opens with a set of traditional jigs that will set you in the mood for the album."
- "They return to the Irish landscape and the traditional for "Green Grow the Laurels." The vocals are beautiful on this song of loss and longing with a quiet delivery that seems so sincere. Alongside these vocal offerings you get hornpipes, jigs, reels, slides and polkas on this excellent album."
- "The lyrics are included and there are nice liner notes on the origins of the songs or how the band members found them."
- "This is a very valuable addition to any Irish music collection."

In a review for Allmusic, Gregory McIntosh concluded:

- "As always, the musicianship between the four members of Patrick Street is impeccable, the songs are well-recorded, and the occasional contemporary songs fit in nicely with the central traditional material."
- "Overall, Street Life is a nice extension to the Patrick Street catalog, but necessary only to collectors, as the album breaks little new ground for the band."

== Track listing ==
1. "Saddle the Pony"/"The Boys of the Town"/"The Frost is All Over" (jigs) (Traditional; arranged by Patrick Street) – 3:37
2. "Barna Hill" (song) (words: Traditional, music: Andy Irvine) – 4:27
3. "The Old Reel"/"Drowsy Maggie"/"Kay Girroir" (reels) (Traditional; arranged by Patrick Street) – 4:11
4. "If We Had Built a Wall" (song) (Dominic Madden, Burke & Foley) – 3:53
5. "Down in Matewan"/"Lost Indian" (song) (Andy Irvine, Traditional) – 4:27
6. "Down By The Old Fairy Fort"/"The Whistler and His Dog" (hornpipes) (Traditional; arranged by Patrick Street) – 4:03
7. "The Diamantina Drover" (song) (Hugh MacDonald) – 5:32
8. "Art O'Keefe's"/"Forget Your Troubles"/"Joe Bane's"/"Kiskeam" (slides & polkas) (Traditional; arranged by Patrick Street) – 5:22
9. "Green Grows the Laurel" (song) (Traditional, Andy Irvine) – 4:19
10. "King of the Pipers"/"Free and Easy"/"The House on the Hill"/"O'Keefe's" (Traditional/Traditional/Joe Thomas/Traditional)
  (jigs & reels) – 5:45

== Personnel ==
- Andy Irvine - vocals, mandolin, bouzouki, harmonica
- Kevin Burke - fiddle
- Jackie Daly - accordion
- Ged Foley - vocals, guitar
- Steve Cooney - percussion – track 3
- Gay Dalzell - harmony vocals – tracks 4, 7 and 9
- Matt McElroy - banjo – track 5
- Bruce Molsky - fiddle – track 5
- Bernie Nau - piano – track 3
- Cal Scott - alto horn, cornet – tracks 4, 6 and 9
