= Riverdance (song) =

1994 single by Bill Whelan

Single by Bill Whelan

from the album Riverdance: Music from the Show
- B-side: "Caraçena"
- Released: 1994
- Recorded: March 1993
- Studio: Windmill Lane (Ringsend, Dublin)
- Genre: Celtic
- Length: 5:48 (full version); 4:01 (radio edit)
- Label: Son; RTÉ
- Songwriter: Bill Whelan
- Producer: Bill Whelan

Audio
- "Riverdance" on YouTube

"Riverdance" is a song by Irish musician Bill Whelan, originally recorded in March 1993 and first performed as the interval act for the Eurovision Song Contest 1994. "Riverdance" is a mostly instrumental composition performed by the RTÉ Concert Orchestra, with an introduction sung by choral ensemble Anúna. The act received such a positive response that Son Records and Raidió Teilifís Éireann (RTÉ) decided to release "Riverdance" as a single.

In Ireland, the song spent a record-breaking 18 weeks at number one on the Irish Singles Chart and is the country's second-best-selling single of all time. "Riverdance" also became a top-10 hit in the United Kingdom, where it reached number nine on the UK Singles Chart. The song's success inspired Whelan to use "Riverdance" as a springboard to conceive an album of similar material and the theatrical show of the same name, which would open in February 1995.

== Background and Eurovision performance ==
"Riverdance" was composed by Bill Whelan and was first recorded at Windmill Lane Studios in Dublin, Ireland, in March 1993. The song's inspiration came from the Eurovision Song Contest 1981, when Ireland, as the competition's hosting country, organised an interval act called "Timedance", a Baroque-influenced ballet composed by Whelan and Dónal Lunny and performed by Planxty. More than 10 years later, in both 1992 and 1993, Ireland won the Eurovision Song Contest, allowing the country to host the contest for its sixth time in 1994, which they would win once more. Whelan, wanting to create an act that illustrated Ireland's cultural history, produced the full score with accompaniment from traditional Irish dancing. Anúna and the RTÉ Concert Orchestra were then selected to perform the song, and the dance routine was choreographed by Michael Flatley, who acted as the lead dancer alongside Jean Butler.

The Eurovision Song Contest 1994 took place on 30 April 1994 at the Point Theatre in Dublin. Commissioned by Moya Doherty, the seven-minute interval performance of "Riverdance" was watched by 300 million people. When the act ended, the theatre's audience gave a standing ovation. Days after the contest ended, worldwide praise of the performance continued to arrive, and the interval act's popularity eventually overshadowed Ireland's third consecutive winning entry, "Rock 'n' Roll Kids". The widespread success of "Riverdance" would lead to the creation of the theatrical show of the same name, which would debut in February 1995 with an expanded score and more choreography from Flatley. The song was later included on the show's official album, Riverdance: Music from the Show (1995).

== Release and chart performance ==
Son Records and RTÉ released "Riverdance" as a single in Ireland shortly after the contest's conclusion. It was issued across three formats: a CD single, a cassette single, and a VHS single titled "Riverdance for Rwanda", which includes a music video that was created to help raise money for relief efforts in the Rwandan Civil War. The song debuted atop the Irish Singles Chart on 5 May 1994, marking the second time that a Eurovision interval act helped propel a musical act to international stardom, after Hothouse Flowers in 1988. After its debut, "Riverdance" held the number-one position on the Irish chart for a record-setting 18 weeks, eventually dropping to number two in early September. The song spent 38 weeks in the Irish top 30 and went on to sell over 90,000 copies in Ireland by September, with at least 20,000 of these sales coming from the VHS single. As of 2010, "Riverdance" was Ireland's second-best-selling single of all time, behind Elton John's "Candle in the Wind 1997" / "Something About the Way You Look Tonight".

Following its Irish success, the "Riverdance" single was rush-released in the United Kingdom through Son Records, going on sale on 23 May 1994 to high expectations. On 30 May, the song debuted at number 95 on the UK Singles Chart but dropped out of the top 100 the following week. The song continued to make sporadic appearances in the top 100 throughout the rest of the year, eventually entering the top 75 for the first time on 11 December 1994 following an appearance on the Royal Variety Performance, during which the act received another standing ovation. The song then climbed the chart, entering the top 20 on Christmas Day and rising to its peak of number nine on 29 January 1995. In total, the song spent 25 non-consecutive weeks in the UK top 100 and ended 1995 as the country's 77th-highest-selling single. In February 1995, the British Phonographic Industry (BPI) awarded the song a silver disc for shipping over 200,000 copies. On the Eurochart Hot 100, the song originally reached number 66 during its Irish chart run, then subsequently peaked at number 32 after its UK success.

== Track listings ==
Irish and UK CD and cassette single

1. "Riverdance" (radio edit)
2. "Caraçena"
3. "Riverdance" (full version)

Irish VHS single

1. "Riverdance" (by Bill Whelan featuring Anúna and the RTÉ Concert Orchestra)
2. "Riverdance" (by Bill Whelan featuring Anúna and the RTÉ Concert Orchestra—repeat)
3. "Riverrun" (Eurovision opening sequence by Macnas)

European CD single

1. "Riverdance" (radio edit)
2. "Marta's Dance / The Russian Dervish"
3. "Riverdance" (album version)

== Credits and personnel ==
Credits are taken from the Irish CD single liner notes.

Studios

- Recorded in March 1993 at Windmill Lane Studios (Ringsend, Dublin, Ireland)
- Mastered at Trend Studios (Dublin, Ireland)

Personnel

- Bill Whelan – music, production
- Anúna – vocals
- Michael McGlynn – Anúna directing and conducting
- RTÉ Concert Orchestra – orchestra
- Michael D'Arcy – orchestra leader
- Noel Kelehan – orchestra conductor
- Kenneth Edge – soprano saxophone
- Máire Breatnach – fiddle
- Cormac Breatnach – Susato whistle
- Ronan Browne – uilleann pipes
- Tommy Hayes – bodhrán, percussion
- Desi Reynolds – tom-toms
- Andrew Boland – engineering
- Alastair McMillan – engineering assistance
- Paul Waldron – mastering
- Works Associates – artwork design
- Robbie Jones – photography

== Charts ==
=== Weekly charts ===
| Chart (1994–1995) | Peak position |
|---|---|
| Europe (Eurochart Hot 100) | 32 |
| Ireland (IRMA) | 1 |
| Scottish Singles Sales (Official Charts) | 12 |
| UK Singles (Official Charts) | 9 |

=== Year-end charts ===
| Chart (1994) | Position |
|---|---|
| UK Singles (OCC) | 160 |

| Chart (1995) | Position |
|---|---|
| UK Singles (OCC) | 77 |

=== All-time charts ===
| Chart | Position |
|---|---|
| Ireland (IRMA) | 2 |

== Certifications and sales ==
| Region | Certification | Certified units/sales |
|---|---|---|
| Ireland | — | 90,000 |
| United Kingdom (BPI) | Silver | 200,000^{^} |
^{^} Shipments figures based on certification alone.
