= Music of Brooklyn (film) =

Soundtracks to the 2015 film Brooklyn

Two soundtrack albums were released for the 2015 historical romance film Brooklyn: an original soundtrack and an original score. Lakeshore Records published both the film score and soundtrack albums. The score for the film's incidental music is composed by Michael Brook, whose 24 tracks – which also includes a song performed by Iarla Ó Lionáird – were published into the score album, and was released on October 30, 2015. Prior to the release, four tracks from the film score, were released exclusively as singles on October 27, 2015, along with a full album preview revealed by IndieWire magazine.

The soundtrack album featured a compilation of Irish classical recordings, performed by several recording artists, released only through Amazon and iTunes on November 20, but was physically released on December 11. A two-disc vinyl, containing both the score and soundtrack, that was released on January 1, 2016.

== Development ==
"We wanted to heighten the emotions in many scenes or portray the internals, and at the same time avoid trying to push the emotions. John was extremely sensitive to that. There was a lot of fine tuning of pushing — or not pushing — that side of things. That was one of the main goals of the score."

— Michael Brook on scoring Brooklyn in an interview to Entertainment Weekly

Michael Brook joined the film as composer in December 2014 and recorded the score later that month. He added that the goal that John had while scoring for the film, was to underscore the emotions and the internal state of Eilis' (Saoirse Ronan) mind so that "it could not be very cheesy". The balancing act of the process was to make the score, "emotional" as well as "slightly unpredictable".

Regarding the instrumentation, Brook said that he wanted to give "a sense of place between Ireland and America, but in a subtle way". He did not agree to prefer standard Irish or Gershwin type tunes, however used mandolin in minor parts in the Irish sections and clarinet and upright bass in the American segments. Since, he worked in Real World Records with Irish singer and music producer Iarla Ó Lionáird, in the late-1990s, he was insisted by Lionáird to visit Ireland and meet the traditional performers. In the process, Brook took a week-long crash course to familiarise and study Irish music.

Brook said that the approach to create the film score is "very sculpted" and the conversations with the director John Crowley helped him to create it as "a product of both our involvements to a large degree". The score was recorded at the Abbey Road Studios, with a larger string section for the film. He intended to use a sampled piano for the score, but later went on with a manual piano, which he felt was "shocking" and "probably a naive one".

Speaking to Entertainment Weekly, Brook recalled that scoring for the scene where Eilis receives a marriage proposal from Tony (Emory Cohen). He said "“I wanted to sort of switch from focusing on Tony’s mission to Eilis gradually being won over and embracing the idea and her happiness about it. At first I didn’t quite get it, at first,” Brook admits of what Crowley was trying to attempt. “But I started to realize John had a very precise map of when things would emerge and when things would change. It was pretty genius when you look at it. Down in the trenches, you’re wrestling with the moment to moment stuff. But his emotional blueprint for the scene and the film as a whole, he had that worked out to an unusual degree."

== Reception ==
The score was positively received from critics and audiences, which was considered as "the highlights of the film". Mfiles critic Sean Wilson wrote "Michael Brook's score for Brooklyn is impressive in a number of ways. In terms of mirroring the emotional journey of Saoirse Ronan's character in the movie, the score is perfect, moving from heartache to harmony to disharmony and back to normality again. Yet where the score really impresses is in its tact: never schmaltzy but always sincere, Brook manages that incredibly difficult trick of jerking the tears without ever seemingly overly manipulative. It's perhaps easy to assume that writing a score for a film like Brooklyn is easy; the real challenge comes in the subtle shadings and the feeling that any emotion has been properly earned. Brooklyn succeeds in all of these areas and then some." Variety's Peter Debruge and The Hollywood Reporter's Todd McCarthy called the score as "beautiful" and "evocative".

Mark Kermode, writing for The Guardian opined that music plays a key storytelling role, and "the new verses and old choruses of Eilis’s life rehearsed amid contrasting dancehall scenes". He added "in one sublime sequence that echoes the poetry of the Pogues’ Fairytale of New York, Eilis serves a communal Christmas dinner to the downtrodden men who 'built the tunnels and bridges', one of whom (played by angel-voiced Iarla Ó Lionáird) stands to sing the traditional Irish love song Casadh an tSúgáin. Wisely, Crowley allows Ó Lionáird’s voice to ring unaccompanied before Michael Brook’s orchestration appears (wonderful to hear a score that is lyrical without recourse to the ladle), a montage of silent faces offering fleeting portraits of homes left and loves lost."

== Track listing ==
Brooklyn (Original Score)

Film score by Michael Brook
- Released: October 30, 2015
- Recorded: 2014–2015
- Genres: Classical; orchestral
- Length: 39:24
- Label: Lakeshore
- Producer: Michael Brook

Michael Brook chronology
Aloft (2015)	Brooklyn (2015)	Tallulah (2016)

Brooklyn (Original Score)
No.	Title	Length
1.	"Opening Titles"	2:00
2.	"Packing For The Voyage"	2:02
3.	"Seasick"	0:50
4.	"Deck Discussion"	1:32
5.	"Arriving In America"	1:54
6.	"Eilis Starts Work"	0:41
7.	"Homesick"	1:01
8.	"Letter from Home"	1:35
9.	"Bookkeeping Class"	1:04
10.	"Casadh An Tsúgáin/Frankie's Song" (performed by Iarla Ó Lionáird)	1:57
11.	"Tony Asks Eilis Out"	0:36
12.	"Letter to Home"	1:09
13.	"Things Are Looking Up"	0:51
14.	"Rose Dies"	2:16
15.	"Mourning"	2:07
16.	"Proposal"	2:42
17.	"Getting Married"	0:43
18.	"Rose's Grave"	1:43
19.	"The Pull of Home"	1:24
20.	"Tony's Letter"	1:22
21.	"Eilis Wavers"	1:02
22.	"Confrontation"	1:22
23.	"Goodbye Eilis"	5:08
24.	"End Credits"	2:09
Total length:		39:24

Brooklyn (Original Motion Picture Soundtrack)

Film score by Michael Brook
- Released: November 20, 2015
- Genres: Classical; pop; R&B
- Length: 33:59
- Label: Lakeshore

Brooklyn (Original Motion Picture Soundtrack)
No.	Title	Performer(s)	Length
1.	"Be Cool aka Keep Cool"	Johnny Moore's Three Blazers	2:46
2.	"Boolavogue"	John Carty; James Blennerhassett; Paul Gurney; Jim Higgins	2:23
3.	"The Yellow Rose Of Texas"	Carty; Blennerhassett; Seamus O'Donnell; Higgins	2:16
4.	"What's It to You Jack"	Linda Hayes	2:16
5.	"The Stack Of Barley"	Carty; Blennerhassett; Gurney; Higgins	2:26
6.	"Castle Finn"	Caoimhín Ó Raghallaigh; Fiachna Ó Mongáin	2:40
7.	"Dynaflow"	Carty; Blennerhassett; O'Donnell; Higgins	1:53
8.	"Zing a Little Zong"	Bing Crosby; Rosemary Clooney	2:18
9.	"Five, Ten, Fifteen Hours"	Ruth Brown	3:09
10.	"A Garden In The Rain"	Carty; Blennerhassett; O'Donnell; Higgins	2:42
11.	"My Wild Irish Rose"	Carty; Blennerhassett; Gurney; O'Donnell; Higgins	3:00
12.	"Casadh An Tsúgáin"	Iarla Ó Lionáird	6:20
Total length:			33:59

== Chart listings ==
Chart (2015–16)	Peak position
UK Soundtrack Albums (OCC)	43
US Top Soundtracks (Billboard)	21

== Accolades ==
Awards	Date of ceremony	Category	Recipient(s)	Result	Ref(s)
Canadian Screen Awards	13 March 2016	Best Original Score	Michael Brook	Won	
Washington D.C. Area Film Critics Association	7 December 2015	Best Original Score	Michael Brook	Nominated	
