= Cornerboys =

Studio album by Patrick Street
- Released: 1996
- Recorded: Mt Hollywood Studios, Vermont, United States
- Genre: Irish folk music
- Length: 51:41
- Label: Green Linnet Records
- Producer: Patrick Street

Patrick Street chronology
| All in Good Time (1993) | Cornerboys (1996) | Made in Cork (1997) |

Cornerboys is the fifth studio album by the Irish folk band Patrick Street, released in 1996 on Green Linnet Records.

It was recorded at Mt Hollywood Studios Vermont, United States, produced by the band and engineered by Rod Ferrell.

The founding members Andy Irvine, Kevin Burke, Jackie Daly were joined by Ged Foley (guitar and Northumbrian pipes), who replaced Arty McGlynn.

== Track listing ==
1. "The White Pettycoat"/"The Kerry Jig"/"Katy is Waiting" (jigs) (Traditional; arranged by Irvine, Burke, Daly and Foley) – 4:34
2. "Sweet Lisbweemore" (song) (Traditional; arranged by Irvine, Burke, Daly and Foley)) – 5:22
3. "Mike McDougall's"/"Paddy Canny's"/"Jim Keefe's" (slides) (Traditional; arranged by Irvine, Burke, Daly and Foley) – 3:41
4. "Devanney's Goat"/"The Leitrim Rover" (Joe Liddy)/"Michael Ryan's" (reels)
  (Traditional; arranged by Irvine, Burke, Daly and Foley) – 4:33
5. "Moorlough Shore" (song) (Traditional; arranged by Irvine, Burke, Daly and Foley) – 5:18
6. "The Kanturk Polka"/"Joe Burke's" (polkas) (Jackie Daly) – 2:47
7. "Portarlington Jig"/"Billy McCormick's"/"Munster Buttermilk" (jigs) (Traditional; arranged by Irvine, Burke, Daly and Foley) – 4:07
8. Pity the Poor Hare – 9:54
  1. "On Yonder Hill" (song) (Traditional; arranged by Andy Irvine)
  2. "Merrily Tripping O'er The Plain" (jig) (Andy Irvine)
  3. "The Kilgrain Hare" (song) (words: Traditional; music: Andy Irvine)
  4. "Pity the Poor Hare" (slow air) (Andy Irvine)
9. "The Lighthouse"/"Neilie Boyle's" (reels) (Traditional; arranged by Irvine, Burke, Daly and Foley) – 2:09
10. "Down By Greer's Grove" (Andy Irvine) – 3:35
11. "Killanan's Fancy"/"The Dash to Portobello" (Sean Ryan)/"Anna Maculeen" (reels)
  (Traditional; arranged by Irvine, Burke, Daly and Foley) – 4:41

== Personnel ==
- Andy Irvine - vocals, mandolin, bouzouki, harmonica
- Kevin Burke - fiddle
- Jackie Daly - accordion
- Ged Foley - guitar, Northumbrian pipes
