= John Carty (musician) =

Irish traditional musician

John Carty is an Irish musician. Considered among Ireland’s best traditional musicians, Carty plays fiddle, tenor banjo, tenor guitar and occasionally the flute. He is very interested in the North Connacht traditional music style.

Carty was born in London and now lives in Boyle, County Roscommon.

His first fiddle album, Last Night's Fun, which released on Shanachie Records in 1996 has been described as a milestone in recorded fiddle music.

In 2003, he was awarded Traditional Musician of the Year by the Irish Television station TG4. The award placed him in the company of previous winners, such as Matt Molloy and Paddy Keenan.

He has played with the bands At the Racket and Patrick Street and has collaborated with poet, Ann Joyce and musicians including Alec Finn, Matt Molloy, Arty McGlynn, Séamus Begley, Dónal Lunny, Marcus Hernon and Michael McGoldrick.

Carty has also featured as a musician in the films Jimmy's Hall (2014), Brooklyn (2015), and Banshees of Inisherin (2022).

== Discography ==
=== Solo ===
- Last Night's Fun (1996)
- Yeh That's All It Is (2001)
- At It Again (2003)
- I Will If I Can (2005)

=== with At the Racket ===
- At the Racket (1998)
- Mirth Making Heroes (2002)
- It's Not Racket Science (2008)

=== with Patrick Street ===
- On the Fly (2007)

=== Guest appearances ===
- Brooklyn (Original Motion Picture Soundtrack) (2015)
- Hiding Daylight in Dark Corners, James Carty (2017)

=== Other collaborations ===
- The Cat that Ate the Candle, John Carty & Brian McGrath (1994)
- Pathway To the Well, Matt Molloy & John Carty with Arty McGlynn (2007)
- Live At The Ulster Folk And Transport Museum December 16th 2004, Matt Molloy & John Carty with Arty McGlynn (2009)
- Meadbh (The Crimson Path), Ann Joyce & John Carty (2010)
- At Complete Ease, John Carty & Brian Rooney (2011)
- Leitrim Equation 3, John Carty, Séamus Begley and Dónal Lunny (2013)
- The Good Mixer - Traditional Irish Music recorded live in London - 1989, John Carty, Henry Benagh, Marcus Hernon & Noel O'Grady (2015)
- Settle out of Court, John & Maggie Carty with Shane McGowan & Dónal Lunny (2016)
- Out of the Ashes, John Carty & Matt Molloy with Arty McGlynn, Brian McGrath & Noel O’Grady (2016)
- The Wavy Bow Collection, John & James Carty (2020)
- At Our Leisure, John Carty & Michael McGoldrick (2022)
