= Riverdance: Music from the Show =

1995 soundtrack album by Bill Whelan

Riverdance: Music From the Show

Studio album by Riverdance
- Released: 1995
- Recorded: Windmill Lane Studios
- Genre: Irish folk
- Length: 1:03:13
- Label: Celtic Heartbeat/Atlantic
- Producer: Bill Whelan

Riverdance: Music from the Show is an album of the music composed by Bill Whelan for the Riverdance theatrical show, and performed by the show's own musicians and singers.

== Background ==
The recording was engineered and mixed at Windmill Lane Studios in 1995.

In February 1995, The Irish Times reported that ANÚNA would not appear on the forthcoming soundtrack album despite continuing to perform in the show. Bill Whelan said that ANÚNA had not been available on the terms offered, that only one track would have involved the group, and that Seolta had been used on the recording instead; in a separate report published the same day, Michael McGlynn disputed that account, stating that ANÚNA would have appeared on three or more tracks and that he could only conclude that Whelan wanted a different sound. The initial 1995 issue of Riverdance: Music from Riverdance the Show credited Seolta on the relevant tracks. A revised 1996 issue, Riverdance: Music from the Show, featured Anúna and was released internationally; the album won the Grammy Award for Best Musical Show Album at the 39th Annual Grammy Awards in 1997.

The album was released five times: in 1995, 1997, 2003, 2005 and 2020, each time with a different cover, sometimes different versions or mixes of the songs, and a slightly different track list. Notably, the "Cloudsong" and "Riverdance" segments are placed under one track going by the name of the latter.

== Track listing ==
Track listing from the original release in 1995:

1. "Reel Around the Sun" (Bill Whelan) – 8:40
2. "The Heart's Cry" (Bill Whelan) – 2:26
3. "The Countess Cathleen/Women of the Sidhe" (Bill Whelan) – 5:42
4. "Firedance" (Bill Whelan) – 6:02
5. "Caoineadh Cú Chulainn" (Lament) (Bill Whelan) – 4:09
6. "Slip into Spring" (Bill Whelan) – 3:44
7. "Riverdance" (Bill Whelan) – 5:42
8. "Lift the Wings" (Bill Whelan) – 4:58
9. "Freedom" (Bill Whelan) – 3:40
10. "Andalucía" (Bill Whelan) – 4:19
11. "Macedonian Morning" (Bill Whelan) – 2:56
12. "Marta's Dance"/"The Russian Dervish" (Bill Whelan) – 6:03
13. "Hope To The Suffering" (Bill Whelan) – 4:52

== Re-releases ==
The album was re-released four times, with a different cover and a slightly different track list each time.

=== 1996 release ===
Riverdance: Music From the Show

Studio album by Riverdance
- Released: 1996
- Recorded: Windmill Lane Studios
- Genre: Irish folk
- Length: 1:12:16
- Label: Celtic Heartbeat/Decca
- Producer: Bill Whelan

Track listing from the second release, available in the United States by 1996:

1. "Reel Around the Sun" (Bill Whelan) – 8:40
2. "The Heart's Cry" (Bill Whelan) – 2:26
3. "The Countess Cathleen/Women of the Sidhe" (Bill Whelan) – 5:42
4. "Caoineadh Cú Chulainn" (Lament) (Bill Whelan) – 4:09
5. "Shivna" (Bill Whelan) – 3:38
6. "Firedance" (Bill Whelan) – 6:02
7. "Slip into Spring" (Bill Whelan) – 3:44
8. "Riverdance" (Bill Whelan) – 5:42
9. "American Wake" (The Nova Scotia Set) (Bill Whelan) – 3:07
10. "Lift the Wings" (Bill Whelan) – 4:58
11. "Macedonian Morning" (Bill Whelan) – 2:56
12. "Marta's Dance"/"The Russian Dervish" (Bill Whelan) – 6:03
13. "Andalucía" (Bill Whelan) – 4:19
14. "Home and the Heartland" (Bill Whelan) – 3:25
15. "The Harvest" (Bill Whelan) – 3:38
16. "Riverdance" (Reprise) (Bill Whelan) – 3:47

=== 2003 release ===
Riverdance: Music From the Show

Studio album by Riverdance
- Released: 2003
- Recorded: Windmill Lane Studios
- Genre: Irish folk
- Length: 1:20:43
- Label: Celtic Heartbeat/Universal
- Producer: Bill Whelan

Track listing from the third release, in 2003, which was the Japanese version and included two bonus tracks:

1. "Reel Around the Sun" (Bill Whelan) – 8:40
2. "The Heart's Cry" (Bill Whelan) – 2:26
3. "The Countess Cathleen/Women of the Sidhe" (Bill Whelan) – 5:42
4. "Caoineadh Cú Chulainn" (Lament) (Bill Whelan) – 4:09
5. "Shivna" (Bill Whelan) – 3:38
6. "Firedance" (Bill Whelan) – 6:02
7. "Slip into Spring" (Bill Whelan) – 3:44
8. "Riverdance" (Bill Whelan) – 5:42
9. "American Wake" (The Nova Scotia Set) (Bill Whelan) – 3:07
10. "Lift the Wings" (Bill Whelan) – 4:58
11. "Macedonian Morning" (Bill Whelan) – 2:56
12. "Marta's Dance"/"The Russian Dervish" (Bill Whelan) – 6:03
13. "Andalucía" (Bill Whelan) – 4:19
14. "Home and the Heartland" (Bill Whelan) – 3:25
15. "The Harvest" (Bill Whelan) – 3:38
16. "Riverdance" (Reprise) (Bill Whelan) – 3:47
17. "I Will Set You Free" (Bill Whelan) – 3:45
18. "Endless Journey" (Bill Whelan) – 4:42

=== 2005 release ===
Riverdance: Music From the Show

Studio album by Riverdance
- Released: 2005
- Recorded: Windmill Lane Studios
- Genre: Irish folk
- Length: 1:12:25
- Label: Celtic Heartbeat/Universal
- Producer: Bill Whelan

Track listing from the fourth release, in 2005, labelled as "10th Anniversary Edition, with newly recorded music":

1. "Reel Around the Sun" (Bill Whelan) – 8:42
2. "The Heart's Cry" (Bill Whelan) – 2:26
3. "The Countess Cathleen/Women of the Sidhe" (Bill Whelan) – 5:44
4. "Caoineadh Cú Chulainn" (Lament) (Bill Whelan) – 4:11
5. "Shivna" (Bill Whelan) – 4:05
6. "Firedance" (Bill Whelan) – 6:04
7. "Slip into Spring"/"The Harvest" (Bill Whelan) – 5:01
8. "Riverdance" (Bill Whelan) – 5:45
9. "American Wake" (The Nova Scotia Set) (Bill Whelan) – 3:07
10. "Lift the Wings" (Bill Whelan) – 3:00
11. "Heal Their Hearts"/"Freedom" (Bill Whelan) – 6:26
12. "Macedonian Morning" (Bill Whelan) – 2:56
13. "Marta's Dance"/"The Russian Dervish" (Bill Whelan) – 6:04
14. "Andalucía" (Bill Whelan) – 4:22
15. "Riverdance" (Reprise) (Bill Whelan) – 4:32

== Personnel ==
The recording included the following performers and production team:

=== Musicians ===
- Cormac Breatnach – tin whistle
- Máire Breatnach – fiddle
- Ronan Browne – uilleann pipes
- Robbie Casserly – bass, drums
- Áine Uí Cheallaigh – vocals
- Anthony Drennan – guitar
- Noel Eccles – percussion
- Kenneth Edge – soprano sax
- Juan Reina Gonzalez – cantor
- Robbie Harris – bodhrán
- David Hayes – keyboards
- Tom Hayes – bodhrán, spoons
- Eileen Ivers – fiddle
- Declan Masterson – low whistle
- Michael McGlynn – conductor
- Des Moore – acoustic guitar
- Máirtín O'Connor – accordion
- Prionsias O'Duinn – conductor
- Eoghan O'Neill – bass guitar
- Nikola Parov – gadulka, kaval
- Desi Reynolds – drums, tom-tom
- Rafael Riqueni – guitar
- Davy Spillane – uilleann pipes, tin whistle

=== Singers ===
- Anúna
- Brian Dunphy
- Lynn Hilary
- Michael Samuels
- The Riverdance Singers

=== Irish dancers ===
- Jean Butler (tracks 3 and 16)
- Michael Flatley (tracks 1, 3 and 16)
- Riverdance Irish Dance Troupe (tracks 1, 3 and 16)

=== Production ===
- Andrew Boland – engineer, mixing, remixing
- Ciaran Cahill – assistant engineer
- Conan Doyle – assistant engineer
- Nick Ingman – orchestration
- Rob Kirwan – assistant engineer
- Bob Ludwig – mastering
- Willie Mannion – assistant engineer
- Conal Markey – assistant engineer
- Alastair McMillian – assistant engineer
- Bill Whelan – arranger, composer, orchestration, producer, remixing

== Charts ==
Chart performance for Riverdance: Music from the Show
Chart (1995–1999)	Peak position
Australian Albums (ARIA)	4
Austrian Albums (Ö3 Austria)	23
Belgian Albums (Ultratop Flanders)	24
Belgian Albums (Ultratop Wallonia)	35
Dutch Albums (Album Top 100)	20
Finnish Albums (Suomen virallinen lista)	8
German Albums (Offizielle Top 100)	39
New Zealand Albums (RMNZ)	15
Norwegian Albums (VG-lista)	3
Swedish Albums (Sverigetopplistan)	4
Swiss Albums (Schweizer Hitparade)	23
UK Albums (Official Charts)	31

== Certifications ==
Certifications for Riverdance: Music from the Show
Region	Certification	Certified units/sales
Australia (ARIA)	2× Platinum	140,000^{^}
United Kingdom (BPI)	Gold	100,000^{*}
United States (RIAA)	Platinum	1,000,000^{^}
^{*} Sales figures based on certification alone.^{^} Shipments figures based on certification alone.
