= Jackie Daly =

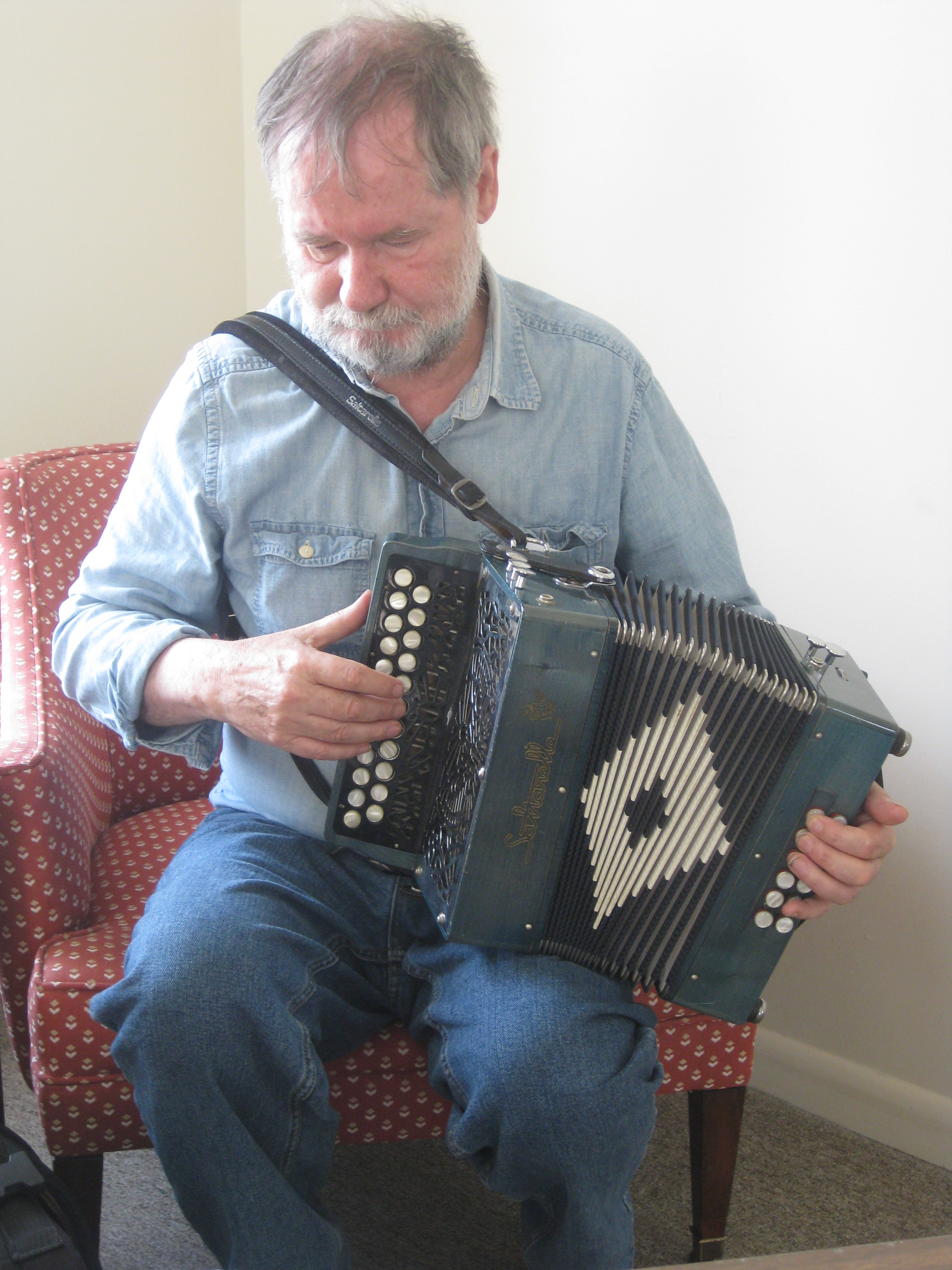
- Jackie Daly, 2012

Background information
- Born: 22 June 1945 (age 80); Kanturk, County Cork, Ireland
- Genres: Irish
- Occupation: Musician
- Instruments: Button accordion, Concertina
- Years active: 1974–present

Jackie Daly (born 22 June 1945, Kanturk, North Cork, Ireland) is an Irish button accordion and concertina player. He has been a member of a number of prominent Irish traditional-music bands, including De Dannan, Patrick Street, Arcady, and Buttons & Bows.

== Music career ==
Born and raised in the area known as Sliabh Luachra, Jackie Daly is one of the foremost living exponents of the distinctive music of that region. Among his early musical influences were his father, a melodeon (one-row accordion) player, and local fiddler Jim Keeffe, under whose tutelage he began playing at "crossroads dances".

After working in the Dutch merchant navy for several years, Daly decided to become a professional musician on returning to Ireland in the early 1970s. In 1974 he won the All-Ireland Accordion Competition in Listowel, County Kerry. To qualify, he was obliged to play a B/C instrument, at the time the only system sanctioned by the competition organizers, but immediately afterwards returned to his chosen C#/D system. In 1977, his first solo recording was released by Topic Records of London as volume 6 of their Music from Sliabh Luachra series.

Daly's musical career is notable for partnerships with several fiddlers, beginning with Séamus Creagh. Their 1977 album, Jackie Daly agus Séamus Creagh, brought Sliabh Luachra music to a wider audience and, with its tight unison playing, set the standard for future accordion and fiddle recordings.

Another influential partnership has been with Kevin Burke, on whose 1978 recording If the Cap Fits he made a guest appearance, and with whom he made another highly regarded fiddle-accordion duet album, Eavesdropper (1981).

Daly was the first of a series of accordionists with De Dannan, appearing on four of their albums between 1980 and 1985. It was his work with this band that is thought by many to have paved the way for the accordion to become a concert-stage, rather than principally a dance-band, instrument in Irish music.

In 1986, Daly joined Patrick Street, a band that Burke was forming with Andy Irvine and Arty McGlynn, and with whom Daly played until 2007.

Between 1984 and 2015 Daly recorded four albums with fiddlers Séamus and Manus McGuire, as Buttons & Bows. He also collaborated with fiddler Máire O'Keeffe, notably on the album Re-Joyce: Tunes and Songs from the Joyce Collection (2003).

In 2005, Daly was named Ceoltóir na Bliana (Musician of the Year) in the Gradam Ceoil awards of the Irish-language television station TG4.

In 2009, Topic Records included in their 70-year anniversary boxed set Three Score and Ten, "The Rising Sun" / "The Pope's Toe" from Jackie Daly - Music from Sliabh Luachra Vol. 6 as track one of the third CD.

In 2010, Daly and fiddler Matt Cranitch released The Living Stream, a recording of chiefly Sliabh Luachra music, followed by Rolling On in 2014.

== Legacy ==
Since the mid-1970s, Daly has been an influential figure in traditional music, widely credited with having rehabilitated the image of the accordion and establishing it as an acceptable instrument for inclusion in the line-up of concert groups.

He launched the move away from the musette tuning of the 1950s and 1960s towards a sweeter sound with lighter tremolo. He has also fostered a significant upswing in the popularity of the C#/D accordion, which is played in the older "press and draw" style — in contrast to the B/C accordion, the predominant tuning system among Irish traditional accordionists, which is played "on the draw".

== Discography ==
Solo

- Jackie Daly: Music From Sliabh Luachra, Volume 6 (1977)
- Many's a Wild Night (1995)
  (With Maire O'Keeffe, Paul de Grae & Garry O'Briain.)

Duets

- Jackie Daly & Séamus Creagh (1977)
- Eavesdropper (Kevin Burke & Jackie Daly) (1981)
- The Living Stream (Matt Cranitch & Jackie Daly) (2010)
- Rolling On (Matt Cranitch & Jackie Daly) (2014)

With De Dannan

- Mist-Covered Mountain (1980)
- The Star-Spangled Molly (1981)
- Song for Ireland (1983)
- Anthem (1985)

With Buttons & Bows

- Buttons & Bows (1984) (as Jackie Daly, Séamus & Manus McGuire)
- The First Month of Summer (1987)
- Grace Notes (1991)
- The Return of Spring (2015)

With Arcady

- After the Ball (1991)

With Patrick Street

- Patrick Street (1986)
- No. 2 Patrick Street (1988)
- Irish Times (album) (1990)
- All in Good Time (1993)
- Cornerboys (1996)
- Made in Cork (1997)
- Live from Patrick Street (1999)
- Street Life (2002)
- On the Fly (2007)

Other

- The 3rd Irish Folk Festival in Concert (1976)
  (Live, with Séamus Creagh and other artistes)
- Sail Og Rua (1983)
  (With Dolores Keane & John Faulkner)
- An Bodhrán/The Irish Drum (1996)
  (Colm Murphy, featuring Jackie Daly, Mairtin O'Connor and Aidan Coffey)
- Re-Joyce, Tunes & Songs from the Joyce Collection (2003)
  (with various other musicians)
