= Tomás Ó Canainn =

Irish musician (1930–2013)

Tomás Ó Canainn (1930 – 15 September 2013) was an Irish Uilleann piper, accordion player, singer, composer, researcher, writer and lecturer in both electrical engineering (principally control engineering) and music. He was a founder of the group Na Filí with fiddler Matt Cranitch and whistle player Tom Barry in the late 1960s and 1970s. They gained considerable popularity and released five albums.

== Life ==
Ó Canainn was born in Pennyburn, Northern Ireland outside Derry but later moved to Cork where he became Dean of Engineering at the University College Cork (UCC). He took over the Irish music lectures from Seán Ó Riada at the college after the latter's death in 1971 and taught music at the Cork School of music. Ó Canainn's daughters also play, violin, viola and cello and all three appear with him on his last solo release. Tomás died in The Mercy Hospital in Cork City on 15 September 2013. He was 82 years old.

== Discography ==
With "Na Filí"

- 1969: An Ghaoth Aniar/The West Wind. Tomás Ó Canainn (spoken commentary and pipes), Matt Cranitch (fiddle), Réamonn Ó Sé (tin whistle). Mercier IRL 9.
- 1971: Farewell To Connacht. Traditional Music of Ireland. Tomás Ó Canainn (uilleann pipes, accordion, and vocal), Matt Cranitch (fiddle), Tom Barry (whistle). LP (Outlet 1010). Later reissued on CD (Outlet PTICD 1010).
- 1972: 3. Tomas O'Canainn, Tom Barry, and Matt Cranitch: fiddle, uilleann pipes, voice, and whistle. LP and cassette (Outlet 1017) formats, then later reissued on CD (Outlet PTICD 1017).
- 1974: A Kindly Welcome. Tomás Ó Canainn (uilleann pipes, vocals), Tom Barry (whistle), Matt Cranitch (fiddle). Dolphin DOL 1008, 1974.
- 1977: Chanter's Tune. Tomás Ó Canainn (uilleann pipes, vocals), Tom Barry (whistles, flute), Matt Cranitch (fiddle). Transatlantic TRA 353, 1977. Later reissued in cassette format as Pickwick Records HPC 650, 1981. Track listing of 1981 reissue at www.irishtune.info.
- 1978: One Day For Recreation. Na Filí [Tomás Ó Canainn (uilleann pipes, vocals), Tom Barry (whistles, flute), Matt Cranitch (fiddle)] and Seán O'Sé With Peadar Mercier. Circa Records, CIRCA 003

Other or solo

- 1979: Aifreann Cholmcille (Religious Mass sung in Irish, recorded in Cork) Cassette only
- 1980: With Pipe and Song (Outlet; OAS 3035)
- 1982: Beal Na Tra (with Nuala O'Canainn) (Outlet; OAS 3040)
- 1998: The Pennyburn Piper Presents Uilleann Pipes (Outlet; PTICD 1093)

== Bibliography ==
- Traditional Music of Ireland, Routledge & Kegan Paul, 1978
- Songs of Cork (Gilbert Dalton, Ltd. 1978)
- New Tunes For Old, 50 original Irish dance tunes by Tomas O'Canainn (Ossian Publications. Book/Cassette. 1985)
- Melos a book of Tomás' poetry in English. (Clog; First Edition 1 January 1987)
- A Lifetime of Notes Tomás' own autobiography. (Collins Press. 1 January 1996)
- Traditional Music in Ireland (Music Sales Corporation. January 1997)
- Tomás' Tunebook (Ossian. 31 December 1997)
- Home to Derry (Appletree Press (IE) January 2004)
- Seán Ó Riada: His Life and Work (Collins Pr. 30 June 2004)
- Traditional Slow Airs of Ireland(Ossian. 31 July 2005)

== Awards ==
Tomás Ó Canainn won the All-Ireland solo piping title and is known as "The Pennyburn Piper". Hence the title of his album recorded in 1998 with Neil Martin, The Pennyburn piper presents: Uilleann Pipes, on which he also sang.

== See also ==
- List of bagpipers
- Uilleann Pipes
- Matt Cranitch

== Sources ==
- Tomás Ó Canainn. A Lifetime of Notes. Collins Press. 1996
