= Patrick Street =

Band

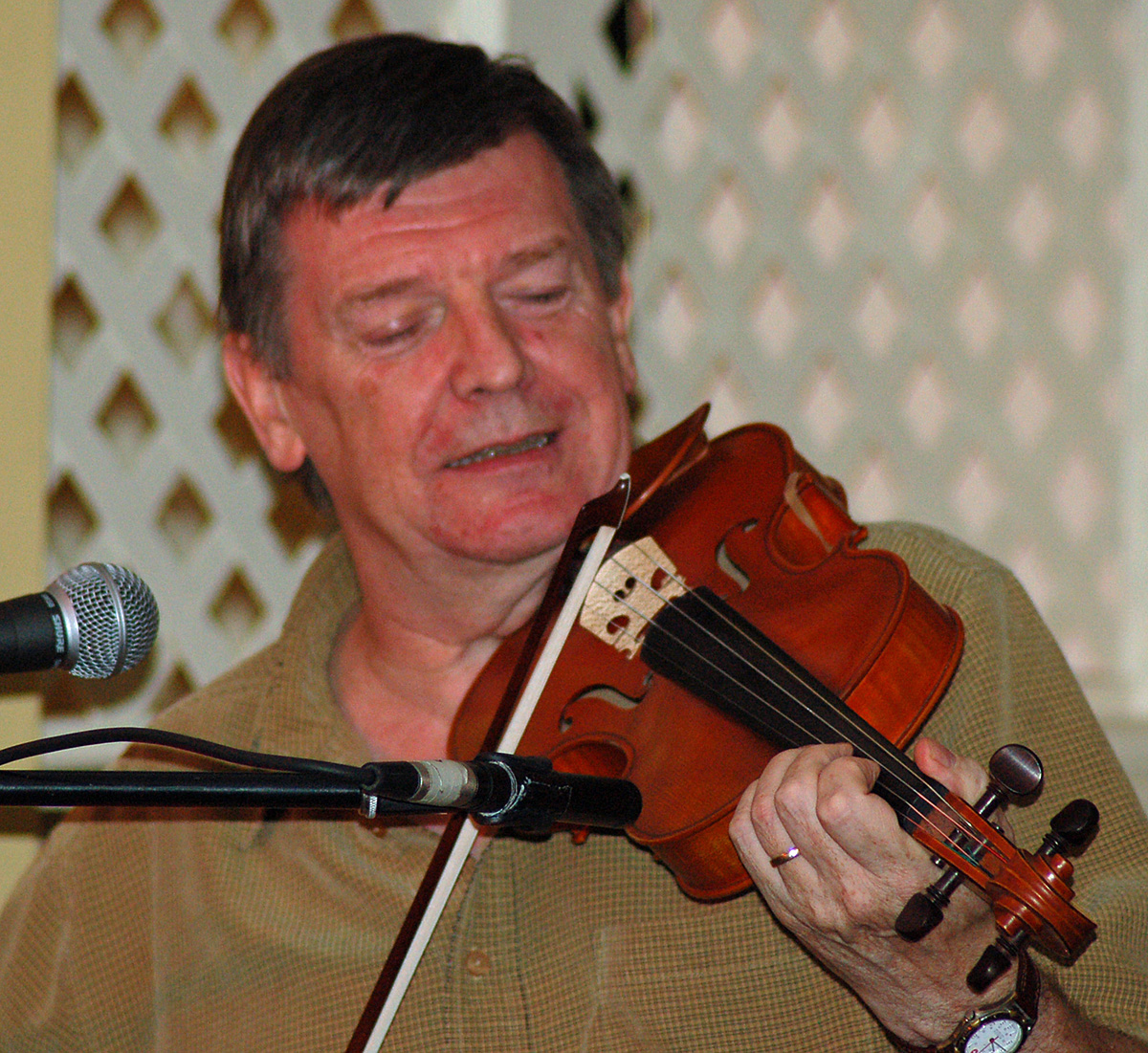
- Kevin Burke of Patrick Street in 2007

Background information
- Origin: Dublin, Ireland
- Genres: Irish folk, folk
- Years active: 1986–2014
- Past members: Mícheál Ó Domhnaill; Gerry O'Beirne; Dónal Lunny; Bill Whelan; Declan Masterson; James Kelly; Brendan Hearty; Kevin Burke; Andy Irvine; John Carty; Jackie Daly; Ged Foley; Arty McGlynn

Patrick Street was an Irish folk group founded by Kevin Burke (formerly of The Bothy Band) on fiddle, Andy Irvine (Sweeney's Men, Planxty) on mandolin, bouzouki, harmonica and vocals, Jackie Daly (De Dannan) on button accordion, and Arty McGlynn (Van Morrison) on guitar.

Other members were added at various times: Ged Foley (The House Band, Battlefield Band) who held the tenure on guitar for many years, Bill Whelan on keyboards, Declan Masterson on uilleann pipes and keyboards, James Kelly on fiddle, Brendan Hearty on harmonium, John Carty on fiddle, flute and banjo, and Enda Walsh on keyboards.

Dónal Lunny, Whelan, and Walsh joined as producers on some albums.

== History ==
In 1985, Andy Irvine joined up with fiddler Kevin Burke and guitarist Mícheál Ó Domhnaill (who had been gigging together around America for some time) and toured as a trio in the USA; when Ó Domhnaill wasn't available for some of the dates, guitarist/vocalist Gerry O'Beirne stepped in.

"This tour was such fun and so successful that we decided to expand the outfit into a four-piece by adding Jackie Daly", Irvine wrote.

Originally billed on a 1986 American tour as "The Legends of Irish Music", they soon chose to call themselves Patrick Street. The line-up for the band underwent several changes, but always included Burke, Irvine and Daly.

The guitar role, however, passed:

- from O'Beirne to Arty McGlynn – before the recording of their first album, Patrick Street, which began in August 1986;
- from McGlynn to Ged Foley – after the band recorded their fourth album, All in Good Time, released in 1993;
- back to McGlynn – when they resumed touring after the completion of their ninth album, On the Fly, released in 2007.

After Daly retired from Patrick Street, John Carty joined on fiddle, flute and tenor banjo in time to record On the Fly.

Patrick Street was originally conceived as a part-time band, nevertheless they have recorded nine studio albums and one live album.

== Music for a Found Harmonium ==
The song was included on the Green Linnet 20th Anniversary, 2-CD collection of various artists, issued in 1996.

The song can be heard in the second episode of Ric Burn's PBS series New York: A Documentary Film, 1999.

In 2004, Patrick Street's rendition of "Music for a Found Harmonium" (originally composed by Simon Jeffes from The Penguin Cafe Orchestra), was used near the end of the film Napoleon Dynamite. It was also used in the 1991 film Hear My Song.

In 2008, the furniture company MFI also used Patrick Street's cover of "Music for a Found Harmonium" as the soundtrack of a TV advertisement.

In 2009, Topic Records included "Music for a Found Harmonium" from Irish Times as track fifteen on the first CD ("Disk one") of their 70-year anniversary boxed set Three Score and Ten.

It was used at the end of the 2026 film, Solo Mio.

== Discography ==
=== Studio albums ===
- Patrick Street (1986)
- No. 2 Patrick Street (1988)
- Irish Times (1990)
- All in Good Time (1993)
- Cornerboys (1996)
- Made in Cork (1997)
- Street Life (2002)
- On the Fly (2007)

=== Live albums ===
- Live from Patrick Street (1999)

=== Compilations ===
- The Best of Patrick Street (1995)
- Compendium: The Best of Patrick Street (2000)
