= All in Good Time (Patrick Street album) =

Studio album by Patrick Street
- Released: 1993
- Recorded: Windmill Lane Studios, Dublin, Ireland
- Genre: Irish folk music
- Length: 43:54
- Label: Green Linnet Records/Special Delivery
- Producer: Bill Whelan

Patrick Street chronology
Irish Times (1990)	All in Good Time (1993)	The Best of Patrick Street (1995)

All in Good Time is the fourth album by the Irish folk band Patrick Street, released in 1993 on Green Linnet Records/Special Delivery.

The founding members (Andy Irvine, Kevin Burke, Jackie Daly, Arty McGlynn) were joined by Bill Whelan on keyboards and backing vocals.

== Recording and production ==
The album was arranged by Patrick Street and Bill Whelan, produced by Bill Whelan, engineered by Pearse Dunne, and recorded at Windmill Lane Studios.

== Critical reception ==
Professional ratings
Review scores
Source	Rating
AllMusic	4.5/5 stars

All in Good Time received positive reviews from folk music critics.

In his review for Folk Roots (May 1993), Colin Irwin called the band "a class act", and highlighted the "fine touch", "subtlety", "artistry", and "relaxed control" displayed on the album. In his review for The Living Tradition, Gordon Potter called the album "a recording of outstanding quality".

== Track listing ==
All tracks Traditional; arranged by Patrick Street and Bill Whelan; except where indicated

1. "Walsh's Polkas" – 3:29
2. "A Prince Among Men (Only A Miner)" (song) (Andy Irvine) – 4:26
3. "Frank Quinn's Reel"/"Lad O'Beirne's"/"Murphy's Reel" – 4:06
4. "Lintheads:" – 7:41
  1. "The Pride Of The Springfield Road" (song) (Traditional; arranged by Andy Irvine)
  2. "Lawrence Common" (instrumental) (Andy Irvine)
  3. "Goodbye Monday Blues" (song) (Andy Irvine, Si Kahn)
5. "Light & Airy"/"All in Good Time" – 3:00
6. "The Mouth of the Tobique"/"Billy Wilson" – 3:02
7. "The Girls Along the Road" (song) (Traditional; arranged by Andy Irvine) – 3:22
8. "The Thames Hornpipe"/"The Fairy Queen" – 2:49
9. "Dennis Murphy's Reel"/"The Bag of Spuds"/"MacFarley's Reel" – 4:35
10. "Carrowclare" (song) (Traditional; arranged by Andy Irvine) – 4:43
11. "Lynch's Barn Dances" – 2:41

== Personnel ==
- Andy Irvine - vocals, mandolin, bouzouki, harmonica
- Kevin Burke - fiddle
- Jackie Daly - accordion
- Arty McGlynn - guitar
- Bill Whelan - keyboards, backing vocals
