= Made in Cork =

Studio album by Patrick Street
- Released: 1997
- Recorded: Soundmasters Studios, Cork, Ireland
- Genre: Irish folk music
- Length: 44:48
- Label: Green Linnet Records
- Producer: Patrick Street

Patrick Street chronology
Cornerboys (1996)	Made in Cork (1997)	Live from Patrick Street (1999)

Made in Cork is the sixth studio album by the Irish folk band Patrick Street, released in 1997 on Green Linnet Records.

== Recording ==
It was recorded at Soundmasters Studios in Cork, Ireland, produced by the band, engineered by Ray Barron and mixed by Ged Foley at Oath Studio, Columbus, Ohio.

Personnel includes Andy Irvine, Kevin Burke, Jackie Daly and Ged Foley.

== Track listing ==
1. "Bring Back The Child"/"Páidín O'Rafferty" (double jigs) (Traditional; arranged by Irvine, Burke, Daly and Foley) – 3:44
2. "The Coalminer"/"The Heather Breeze"/"Turf House" (Ged Foley) (reels)
  (Traditional; arranged by Irvine, Burke, Daly and Foley) – 2:39
3. "Her Mantle So Green" (song) (words: Traditional; music: Andy Irvine) – 4:54
4. "The Midnight Ramble"/"The Bogman"/"The Old Stage" (slides) (Traditional; arranged by Irvine, Burke, Daly and Foley) – 3:09
5. "Maurice O'Keefe's"/"Maurice O'Keefe's"/"Sonny Reardon's" (slow polkas) (Traditional; arranged by Irvine, Burke, Daly and Foley) – 4:07
6. "The Rainbow 'Mid The Willows" (song) (words: Traditional; music: Andy Irvine) – 5:33
7. "Where Lilies Bloom"/"The Village Tavern"/"The Four Cross Roads" (polkas)
  (Traditional; arranged by Irvine, Burke, Daly and Foley) – 3:38
8. "Spanking Maggie From The Ross" (song) (words: Traditional; music: Andy Irvine) – 4:11
9. "The Winding Stairs"/"Ride A Mile" (slip jigs) (Traditional; arranged by Irvine, Burke, Daly and Foley) – 2:28
10. "When Adam Was In Paradise" (song) (words: Traditional; music: Andy Irvine) – 2:30
11. "The Raven Through The Bog"/"The Forrester" (hornpipes) (Traditional; arranged by Irvine, Burke, Daly and Foley) – 3:46
12. "Up To Your Neck In Sand"/"Coffey's Reel"/"John Brennan From Sligo" (reels)
  (Traditional; arranged by Irvine, Burke, Daly and Foley) – 4:09

== Personnel ==
- Andy Irvine - vocals, mandolin, bouzouki, harmonica
- Kevin Burke - fiddle
- Jackie Daly - accordion
- Ged Foley - guitar, backing vocals
