= Na Ceannabháin Bhána =

Song in slip jig time from Carna in Connemara, County Galway, Ireland

Na Ceannabháin Bhána (Irish: [n̪ˠə ˈcan̪ˠəwaːnʲ ˈwaːnˠə]; "The Fair Canavans") is a song in slip jig time from Carna in Connemara, County Galway, Ireland. It was collected by Séamus Ennis from Colm Ó Caoidheáin who is thought to have written it for his two fairhaired (bán) grandchildren whose surname was Canavan / Ó Ceannabháin. The title of this piece of music when played without lyrics has been mistranslated as The White Cotton Flowers or The Fair Cotton Flowers due to the similarity to the Irish word for bog cotton i.e. Ceannbhán to the surname Ó Ceannabháin which actually derives from the earlier Ó Ceanndhubháin (a branch of the (Uí Bhriúin Seola) meaning the descendant of Ceanndhubhán "blackheaded" i.e. "blackhaired". One story of the song's meaning is of a grandparent calling out for the two fair haired children, who are hiding amongst the bog-cotton of their namesake. The second verse relates the frustration of their refusal to reveal themselves, with the threat of being put up to the local witch "Sadhbh Sheáin" who will put a curse upon them.

== Irish lyrics ==
Goirim fhéin, goirim fhéin, goirim fhéin
Goirim fhéin Micil 's Máire
Goirim fhéin, goirim fhéin, goirim fhéin
Siúd iad na Ceannabháin Bhána

Cuirfidh mé, cuirfidh mé, cuirfidh mé
Cuirfidh mé suas chuig Sadhbh Sheáin thú
Cuirfidh mé, cuirfidh mé, cuirfidh mé
'S cuirfidh sí buairthín sa ngleann ort

== English translation ==
I summon you, I summon you, I summon you
I summon you Michael and Mary
I summon you, I summon you, I summon you
The little fair Canavans

I'll send you, I'll send you, I'll send you
I'll send you up to Sadhbh Sheáin's
I'll send you, I'll send you, I'll send you
And she will put a curse (lit. a small worry) on you in the glen
