= Kevin Burke (musician) =

Irish fiddler (born 1950)

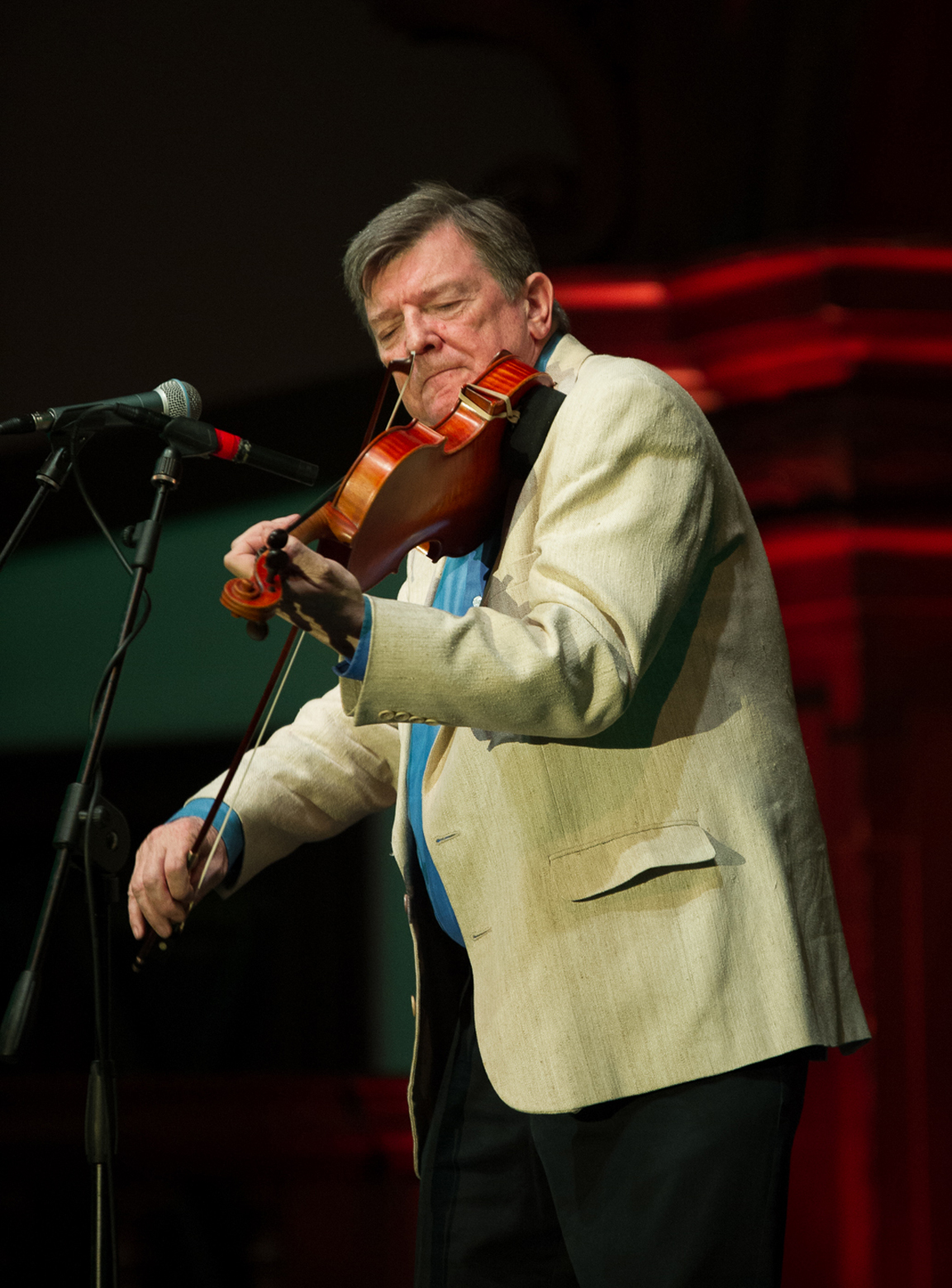
- Burke performing in 2014

Background information
- Born: 1950 (age 75–76); London, England
- Genre: Irish
- Occupation: Musician
- Instrument: Fiddle
- Years active: 1958–present
- Website: www.kevinburke.com

Kevin Burke (born 1950) is an Irish master fiddler considered one of the finest living Irish fiddlers. For nearly five decades he has been at the forefront of Irish traditional music and Celtic music, performing and recording with the groups The Bothy Band, Patrick Street, and the Celtic Fiddle Festival. He is a 2002 recipient of a National Heritage Fellowship from the National Endowment for the Arts. He is also regarded as a fiddle-singing pioneer.

In addition to his solo albums, Burke has had successful project collaborations with Christy Moore, Andy Irvine & Paul Brady, Mícheál Ó Domhnaill, Jackie Daly, Ged Foley and Cal Scott.

== Early life ==
Kevin Burke was born in 1950 in London, England to parents from County Sligo in Ireland. Inheriting a love of Irish music from his parents, he took up the fiddle at the age of eight, studied under Jessie Christopherson, and eventually developed an advanced technique in the Sligo fiddling style. He travelled frequently to Ireland to visit relatives and immersed himself in the local Sligo music. By the age of thirteen, he was playing with Irish musical groups.

== Career ==
Burke joined a céilí band, the Glenside, and played weekends at various Irish dance halls around London. In 1966, the Glenside performed at the céilí band competition at the All-Ireland Fleadh in Boyle in County Roscommon and won the competition.

In 1972, Burke met American singer-songwriter Arlo Guthrie in a pub in Milltown Malbay in County Clare. Impressed with Burke's fiddling, Guthrie invited him to Los Angeles to play on his album Last of the Brooklyn Cowboys (1973). Burke's exposure to the musicians he met in the United States—including accordionist Joe Burke and fiddler Andy McGann—inspired him to make a career of playing music. In 1974, Burke moved to Dublin, where he teamed up with singer-songwriter Christy Moore, a former member of the Irish band Planxty. Together with Jimmy Faulkner and Declan McNelis, they played throughout Ireland for the next few years.

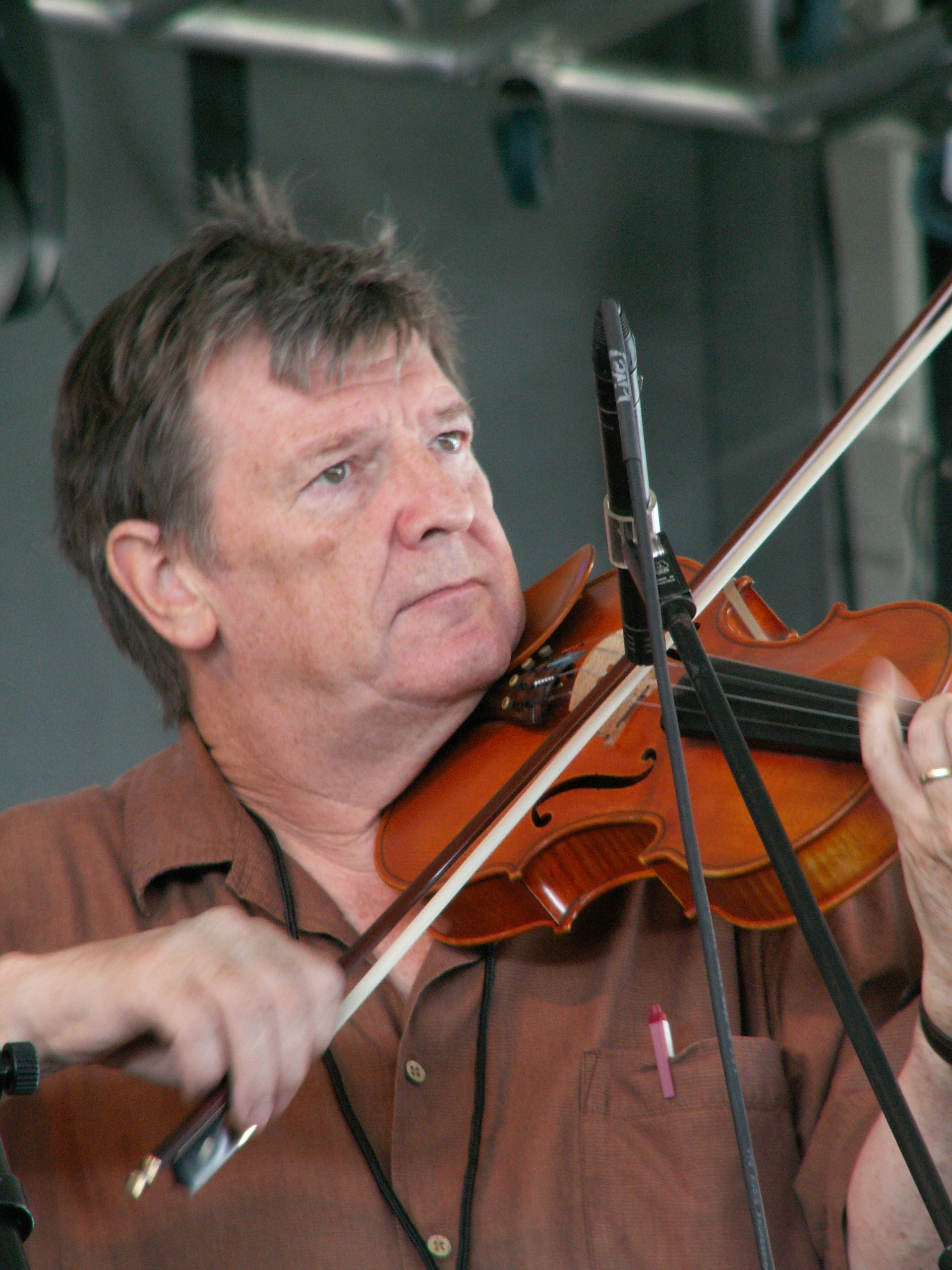
Burke at the Dublin Irish Festival, 2008

In 1976, Burke became a member of the Irish traditional music group The Bothy Band; the band, active for three years in the late 1970s, was well-known for its enthusiastic and highly skilled performances. Burke replaced Tommy Peoples on fiddle, and soon became an integral member of the group, appearing on three of their albums: Old Hag You Have Killed Me (1976), Out of the Wind – Into the Sun (1977), and After Hours (Live in Paris) (1979). Burke developed a friendship with the band's guitarist and vocalist, Mícheál Ó Domhnaill, and soon the two began appearing together as a duo. When the Bothy Band disbanded in 1979, they toured the United Kingdom and Europe together, and recorded the album Promenade (1979). In 1980, Burke and Ó Domhnaill moved to the United States and toured throughout the country before settling in Portland, Oregon, where they recorded a second album, Portland (1982).

In 1985, Burke joined the Legends of Irish Music tour, where he played with Irish musicians Andy Irvine (vocals, bouzouki, mandolin and harmonica) and Jackie Daly (accordion). Together they formed the group Patrick Street. During the next two decades, the group released nine albums (excluding two compilations): Patrick Street (1987), No. 2 Patrick Street (1988), Irish Times (1990), All in Good Time (1993), Cornerboys (1996), Made in Cork (1997), Live from Patrick Street (1999), Street Life (2002), and On the Fly (2007).

In 1992, Burke recorded the solo album Open House with Mark Graham (harmonica, clarinet, vocals), Paul Kotapish (guitar, mandolin, cittern, bass), and Sandy Silva (percussive dance). These three comprised the core of his band and together, as the group Open House, they recorded two other albums, Second Story (1994) and Hoof and Mouth (1997). In the early 1990s, Burke started touring and recording with Scottish fiddler Johnny Cunningham and Breton fiddler Christian Lemaître as the Celtic Fiddle Festival. Together they released six albums: Celtic Fiddle Festival (1993), Celtic Fiddle Festival: Encore (1998), Rendezvous (2001), Play On (2005), Equinoxe (2008), and Live in Brittany (2013).

In 2002, Burke was awarded a National Heritage Fellowship from the National Endowment for the Arts, the highest honour given in the United States for folk and traditional arts. In recent years, Burke partnered with Ged Foley to record In Tandem (2006), and collaborated with documentary film composer Cal Scott on the album Across the Black River (2007) and follow-up album Suite (2010). In 2007, Burke started an independent record company, Loftus Music, to release his own recordings. Burke continues to tour throughout the world, including performances in Australia in 2013.

In 2016, Burke was awarded the "Gradam Ceoil" (Musician of the Year) in the traditional-music awards presented by the Irish-language TV channel TG4.

He currently lives in Portland, Oregon with his wife and two children.

== Playing style ==
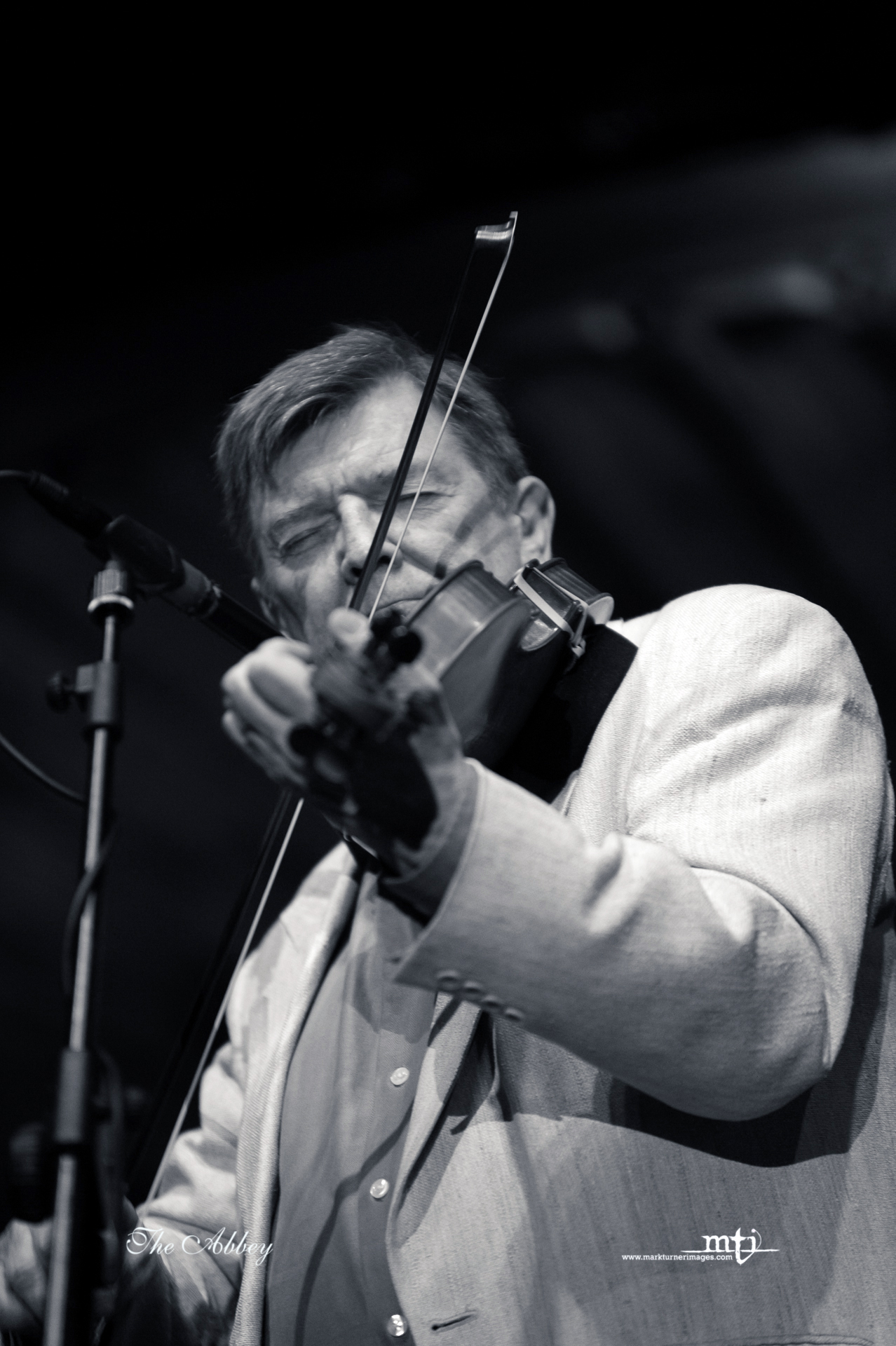
Burke at The Abbey in Nicholls, Australia, 2014

Burke's fiddle playing style was heavily influenced by the Sligo style playing of Michael Coleman, Paddy Killoran, and James Morrison. Burke described the style as being "the best of both worlds"—combining the driving rhythm of Donegal style and the smooth lyricism of Clare style. While acknowledging that his playing is "based on" the Sligo style, he also acknowledges being influenced by many different musical styles outside of Irish traditional music. For example, one of the distinctive features of his playing is the "strong backbeat he applies to many reels, with emphasis on every third quaver", presenting the emphasised beat with an up bow, versus the traditional approach of playing that pattern with an emphasised downbow. Burke also emphasises the strong beat by playing "an adjacent open string as the bow digs in".

== Instruments and equipment ==
Burke currently plays a fiddle made by Michiel De Hoog, a Dutch violin maker working in Dublin. In 2000, his old Tony Martin fiddle had become unstable, despite several repair attempts. Looking for a more stable instrument to play on the road, he turned to his friend De Hoog, who had just finished an instrument. After playing it in the shop, Burke purchased it and has been playing it almost exclusively since. Occasionally, he will play his old Tony Martin fiddle or a fiddle made by Jeff Manthos of Oregon.

Burke uses Obligato strings made by Pirastro and rosin made by Gustave Bernadel. The bow he uses exclusively was given to him by his brother Noel Burke, a bow maker, in 2000 for his fiftieth birthday. He carries his fiddle and gear in a Maurizio Riboni case from Cremona, Italy. To amplify his instrument, Burke uses an MBC-603 condenser microphone on a stand. Sometimes he uses a Swiss-made Kurmann Soundpost pick-up designed by Ronnie Arber Audiotechnik along with the microphone.

== Discography ==
Solo albums

- Sweeney's Dream (1977)
- If the Cap Fits (1978)
- Up Close (1984)
- In Concert (1999)
- An evening with Kevin Burke (2018)

With Christy Moore

- Whatever Tickles Your Fancy (1975)
- Christy Moore (1976)

With Andy Irvine & Paul Brady

- Andy Irvine/Paul Brady (1976)

With the Bothy Band

- Old Hag You Have Killed Me (1976)
- Out of the Wind – Into the Sun (1977)
- After Hours (Live in Paris) (1979)

With Mícheál Ó Domhnaill

- Promenade (1979)
- Portland (1982)

With other artists

- Eavesdropper (1981) with Jackie Daly
- In Tandem (2006) with Ged Foley
- Across the Black River (2007) with Cal Scott
- Suite (2010) with Cal Scott
- Sligo Made (2019) with other Sligo musicians

With Patrick Street

- Patrick Street (1987)
- No. 2 Patrick Street (1988)
- Irish Times (1990)
- All in Good Time (1993)
- The Best of Patrick Street (1995)
- Cornerboys (1996)
- Made in Cork (1997)
- Live from Patrick Street (1999)
- Compendium: The Best of Patrick Street (2000)
- Street Life (2002)
- On the Fly (2007)

With Open House

- Open House (1992)
- Second Story (1994)
- Hoof and Mouth (1997)

With Celtic Fiddle Festival

- Celtic Fiddle Festival (1993)
- Celtic Fiddle Festival: Encore (1998)
- Rendezvous (2001)
- Play On (2005)
- Equinoxe (2008)
- Live in Brittany (2013)

With John Brennan

- The Pound Ridge Sessions (2016)

== See also ==
- Folk music of Ireland
- Irish fiddle
- Music of Ireland
