= Matt Cranitch =

Irish fiddle player

- Born: 1948 (age 76–77)
- Genres: Irish
- Occupation: Musician
- Instrument: fiddle
- Labels: Ossian, Gael Linn, Mercier, Outlet, Dolphin, Harmonia Mundi, Transatlantic, Circa, Mulligan, DARA, Cross Border Media, Kelly’s Music, MJM
- Website: https://www.mattcranitch.com/

Matt Cranitch (born 1948) is an Irish fiddle player. Cranitch is a founding member of Na Fili. He is a graduate in electrical engineering and music from University College Cork, lectures at the Cork Institute of Technology on subjects of electronic engineering and music technology. He has a particular involvement in the music of Sliabh Luachra, on the Cork/Kerry border, and is engaged in on-going research on the fiddling style of this region at the Irish World Music Centre, University of Limerick. He has written extensively on Irish traditional music. He has also been a member of the band Sliabh Notes. He currently lives in County Cork.

== Discography ==
Solo albums

- The Irish Fiddle Book (Demonstration Recording) (Ossian OSSCD4, 1988)
- Take a Bow (Ossian OSSCD5, 1988)
- Give it Shtick (Ossian OSSCD6, 1988)
- Éistigh Seal (Gael Linn CEF104, 1984; CEFCD104, 2005)

With Na Filí

- An Ghaoth Aniar (Mercier IRL9, 1969)
- Farewell to Connacht (Outlet SOLP1010, 1971)
- Na Filí 3 (Outlet SOLP1017, 1972)
- A Kindly Welcome (Dolphin DOL1008, 1974)
- Folklore aus Ireland (Harmonia Mundi 20 22159-8, 1975)
- Chanter’s Tune (Transatlantic TRA353, 1977)
- One Day for Recreation (Circa 003, 1978)

With Dave Hennessy & Mick Daly

- Any Old Time (Mulligan LUN047, 1982)
- Phoenix (DARA CD025, 1987)
- Crossing (DARA CD072, 1995)

With Dónal Murphy & Tommy O’Sullivan

- Sliabh Notes (Cross Border Media CBMCD018, 1995; Kells Music KM-9506, 1996)
- Gleanntán (Ossian OSSCD114, 1999)
- Along Blackwater’s Banks (Ossian OSSCD130, 2002)

With Jackie Daly

- The Living Stream (MJM001, 2010)
- Rolling On (MJM002, 2014)

Compilations

- The Mountain Road: The Traditional Music of Cork and Kerry - featuring various artists (Ossian OSSCD84, 1995)
- The County Bounds: Music and Song from the Cork-Kerry Border - featuring various artists, selected recordings from ‘The 1998 Seán Ó Riada International Conference’ (Ossian OSSCD113, 1999)

See also Na Fili Discography.
