= Michael McGlynn =

Irish composer

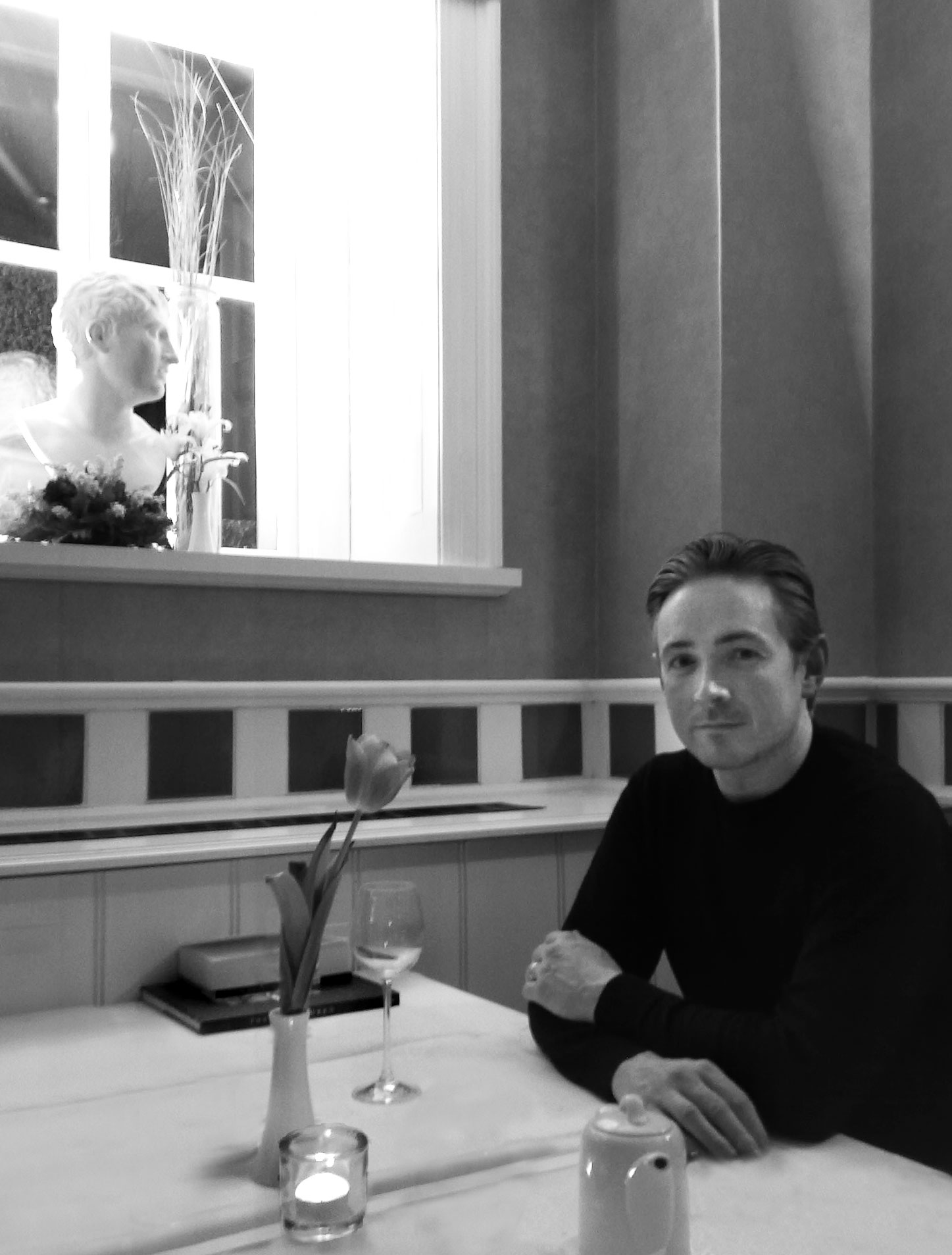
- Michael McGlynn

Background information
- Born: Michael Philip McGlynn; 11 May 1964 (age 62)
- Origin: Dublin, Ireland
- Genres: Contemporary classical
- Occupation: Composer
- Website: www.michaelmcglynn.com

Michael McGlynn (born 11 May 1964) is an Irish composer and the founder and artistic director of the vocal ensemble Anúna, which he established in Dublin in 1987 as the principal vehicle for the creation, performance, and recording of his music. His work draws on medieval polyphony, Irish traditional music, and contemporary compositional language, and has been discussed in scholarship as part of the development of a distinctively Irish choral voice.

== Career ==
=== Early life and Anúna ===
Michael McGlynn was born in Dublin and attended Coláiste na Rinne and Blackrock College. He studied Music and English at University College Dublin and Trinity College Dublin, obtaining a Bachelor of Arts degree in 1985 and a Bachelor of Music degree in 1986. He was a member of the RTÉ Chamber Choir before founding the vocal ensemble Anúna in 1987, originally under the name An Uaithne, with the aim of creating and performing a repertoire combining medieval sacred music, Irish-language texts, and newly composed works. In 1991 the ensemble adopted the name Anúna.

During the late 1980s and early 1990s McGlynn developed the body of choral work that would form the core of his compositional reputation, including the Celtic Mass (1989–91) and Invocation (1993), both subsequently the subject of detailed scholarly analysis. In 1990 he wrote music for the Gate Theatre production of Chekhov's Three Sisters, in a new adaptation by Frank McGuinness directed by Adrian Noble, which was subsequently performed at the Royal Court Theatre in London. Although best known for choral music, McGlynn has also composed orchestral and instrumental works. His saxophone and piano work Visions (1996) was commissioned by Gerard McChrystal and received its premiere at Wigmore Hall, London, on 31 May 1996, performed by McChrystal and pianist Kathryn Page. The third movement, "From Nowhere to Nowhere", was subsequently included on McChrystal's debut album Meeting Point. The piece is included in the Trinity College London Saxophone Diploma Repertoire List. McGlynn's orchestral and choral music was recorded with the Ulster Orchestra on the album Behind the Closed Eye in 1997, marking a significant expansion beyond his predominantly a cappella output.

=== Later work and honours ===
In 2007 McGlynn was commissioned by Chanticleer to contribute the "Agnus Dei" to And on Earth, Peace: A Chanticleer Mass, a collaborative work by five composers premiered at the Metropolitan Museum of Art in New York. That year he also premiered the cantata St Francis, commissioned by RTÉ and presented in collaboration with University College Dublin's Louvain Centre for Irish Studies.

McGlynn has worked internationally as a choral clinician and educator. In 2011–12 he was Dorothy F. Schmidt Eminent Scholar in the Arts at Florida Atlantic University. In 2015 he presented on his compositional approach at the American Choral Directors Association National Conference in Salt Lake City. He received the UCD Alumni Award in Arts and Humanities in 2017 and was named one of the inaugural UCD Creative Fellows in 2019. He served as Artistic Director of the Tampere Vocal Music Festival in Finland in 2021. In September 2025 he received an Honorary Doctorate in Music from University College Dublin.

In 2017 McGlynn collaborated with Noh actor Genshō Umewaka on Takahime, a Celtic–Noh adaptation of W. B. Yeats's At the Hawk's Well, composing the score and co-directing the production with Umewaka, who holds the designation of Living National Treasure. In December 2024 he directed and composed music for Yuki-onna no Gensō, a further Noh collaboration performed at Sumida Triphony Hall in Tokyo.

McGlynn is also the founder of M'ANAM, a male vocal ensemble established in 2018, and Systir, a female vocal ensemble established in 2019. McGlynn has also produced and directed film work. His films have been screened at the Irish Festival of Oulu and the Kerry International Film Festival, and broadcast by TG4 and Sveriges Television. In 2023 McGlynn wrote the Irish-language lyrics for the theme song of Bayonetta Origins: Cereza and the Lost Demon.

== Musical language ==
In his study of twentieth-century Irish music, Axel Klein identified McGlynn as one of the most individual Irish composers of his generation, noting that his frame of reference bypasses the Baroque and Romantic periods in favour of a lineage running from Machaut, Dufay and Gesualdo through Debussy and Messiaen to American minimalism and Irish traditional music. Klein characterised the resulting style as combining early polyphony with impressionistic harmonic colour, with triple groupings and rapid metric shifts as recurrent rhythmic features. Writing in Classical Ireland in 1999, Bruno Breathnach identified Ligeti, Lutosławski and Berg as further formative influences alongside Debussy, early music and traditional song.

Rossow has identified recurrent technical features across McGlynn's output, including modal structures, chromatic melodic passages, and the extensive use of augmented chords with major sevenths and other extensions. She characterises his music as more horizontal than vertical in construction, arguing that although the harmonic language is often complex, the ear is drawn towards tonality through diatonic and modal scales that may operate independently of any stated key signature. Rossow writes that "Dúlamán", although based on a traditional Irish text, bears no resemblance to the traditional tune beyond the words, and that its musical basis lies instead in the rhythmic inflection of the language and the asymmetrical energy of the refrain.

Marrolli's analysis of McGlynn's sacred and secular works identifies rhythm and metre as primary structural elements, noting his frequent use of shifting compound metres, cross-rhythms, and rhythmic ostinato. She describes his harmonic language as drawing on modal scales that often move between tonality and atonality, with open fifths and drone-based sonorities contributing to what she characterises as a timeless, ritual quality in the music.

In a detailed analysis of "O Maria", Seán Doherty argued that McGlynn systematically disrupts textual intelligibility and obscures formal boundaries through fragmented text-setting, repetition, monotone recitation, melisma, and continuity of texture, producing a mantra-like surface oriented towards contemplative listening.

Rossow places McGlynn among composers who used Irish-language texts, modal harmony, and traditional materials to articulate a distinct national choral voice, while Boushel argues that his work represents a contemporary reimagining of Irish choral music outside revivalist frameworks. Writing in the Japanese music journal Latina, critic Shinya Matsuyama characterised McGlynn's music as combining Celtic modal writing with dissonance and timbres associated with twentieth-century music, creating a sound-world in which past and present seemed to coexist.

== Reception ==
Critics have often noted McGlynn's distance from both strict historical reconstruction and commercialised Celtic stylisation. Reviewing Anúna in The Irish Times in 1994, Michael Dervan wrote that McGlynn's approach "avoids both academic reconstruction and commercial pastiche", treating early sacred material, traditional Irish texts, and newly composed works "as living music rather than as historical artefacts". In 1989, Dervan had already singled out McGlynn's "O vos omnes", heard at the Cork International Choral Festival seminar on contemporary choral music, as the new work that carried "the strongest suggestion of an individual voice".

Contemporary Irish reviews of Anúna's recordings emphasised both the complexity and distinctiveness of the writing. Nuala O'Connor described "Quis est Deus" as "a complex vocal arrangement of unearthly beauty" and wrote that "Peperit Virgo" set angular dissonance against the medieval sonority of three viola da gambas. Reviewing Sensation in 2006, Sarah McQuaid described "O Maria" as "shimmering, densely textured" and argued that it deserved a place in the standard choral repertoire.

Bruno Breathnach, writing in Classical Ireland in 1999, described McGlynn as a composer of "calibre and originality" and argued that he should not have had to wait until his mid-thirties for an orchestral commission in Ireland. In the same article, Breathnach called "From Nowhere to Nowhere" "an intoxicating piece for solo saxophone" and wrote that "Where All Roses Go" ended "with as much isolation as a melody can carry". He also described "Sanctus" as keeping alive "a much older tradition of performance as ritual" and called "Tenebrae I" and "II" "stunning".

International criticism has often centred on individual works performed or recorded by other ensembles. Vivien Schweitzer, writing in The New York Times, described McGlynn's "Agnus Dei" as the most emotionally direct contribution to And on Earth, Peace: A Chanticleer Mass. Barrymore Laurence Scherer, in The Wall Street Journal, wrote that the work shaped a chant-like melody with Irish inflection over a droning bass line and gave the mass a peaceful conclusion. Anastasia Tsioulcas, writing in Gramophone, described McGlynn as helping to establish an Irish choral legacy through engagement with ancient musical forms.

In Crescendo, Jean-Baptiste Baronian placed McGlynn's Celtic Mass in the lineage of twentieth-century British religious-music renewal associated with Vaughan Williams's Mass in G minor. Reviewing A Whisper of Paradise for Seen and Heard International, Colin Clarke wrote that the "Sanctus" from McGlynn's Celtic Mass "exuded a blissfully timeless quality" in its slow-moving lines and grounding drones.

== Selected works ==
The following works are among those explicitly discussed in scholarship or cited in critical commentary.

- "Invocation" (1993; tenor and mixed-voice choir)
- Celtic Mass (1989–91; mixed-voice choir, soloists, and instrumental ensemble) – subject of a doctoral study by Marrolli (2010); recorded by the Taylor Festival Choir under Robert Taylor
- Behind the Closed Eye (1997; choral-orchestral cycle) – recorded with the Ulster Orchestra
- "Dúlamán" (1995; male-voice choir) – discussed in detail by Rossow; recorded by the Kansas City Chorale on Artifacts: The Music of Michael McGlynn
- "O Maria" (mixed-voice choir) – subject of a detailed analysis by Doherty (2022)
- "Agnus Dei" (tenor solo and mixed-voice choir) – commissioned by Chanticleer for And on Earth, Peace: A Chanticleer Mass (2007); reviewed in The New York Times and Gramophone
- "Amhrán na Gaoithe / Song of the Wind" (mixed-voice choir) – performed by Chanticleer; reviewed in the Dallas Morning News (2012)
- "O pia virgo" (ATBarB) – recorded by New York Polyphony on Sing Thee Nowell (2014), a Grammy-nominated album
- Takahime (mixed voices, incidental music for Noh play) – premiered in Tokyo in 2017 in collaboration with Genshō Umewaka

== Selected discography ==
McGlynn's music has been recorded extensively, most frequently by Anúna, which has served as the principal vehicle for the premiere and dissemination of his work.

=== Recordings with Anúna ===
- Anúna (1993)
- Invocation (1994)
- Omnis (1995)
- Deep Dead Blue (1996)
- Behind the Closed Eye (1997), with the Ulster Orchestra
- Cynara (2000)
- Sensation (2006)
- Celtic Origins (2007)
- Christmas Memories (2008)
- Sanctus (2009)
- Illumination (2012)
- Revelation (2015)
- Otherworld (2023)
- Eilífð (2025)
- Tochairm (2025)

=== Recordings by other ensembles ===
McGlynn's compositions have been recorded by a number of other vocal ensembles. Chanticleer's And on Earth, Peace: A Chanticleer Mass (Warner Classics, 2007) includes his "Agnus Dei", commissioned for the work's world premiere at the Metropolitan Museum of Art in New York; the Kansas City Chorale has devoted an entire album to his music, Artifacts: The Music of Michael McGlynn; Conspirare has recorded "Island" and "Incantations"; Apollo5 has recorded "Am gaeth i m-muir", "Where All Roses Go", and "O pia virgo"; New York Polyphony recorded "O pia virgo on" Sing Thee Nowell (2014), a Grammy-nominated album; and the Celtic Mass was recorded by the Taylor Festival Choir and Instrumental Ensemble under Robert Taylor in 2016.
