= Marcus Hernon =

Irish flute player and flute maker

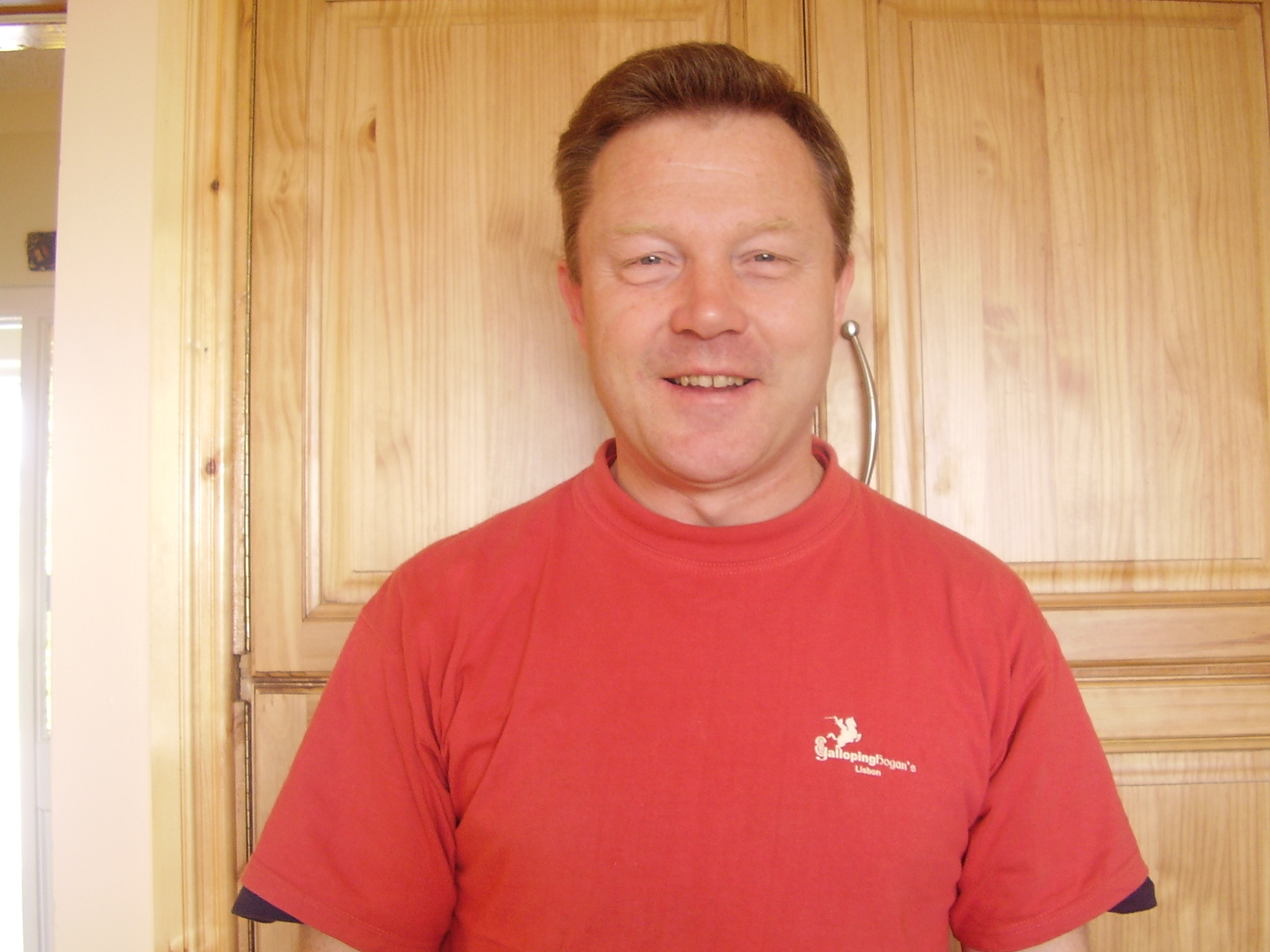

Background information
- Genres: Traditional Irish music
- Occupation(s): Flute player, flute maker and composer
- Labels: Feenish Sound
- Website: www.marcushernon.com

Marcus Hernon is a flute player and flute maker. He has won two senior titles at Fleadh Cheoil.

== Early years ==
Hernon was born in Roisín na Mainíach, Carna, County Galway, Ireland.

== Career ==
Hernon used to play with Johnny Connolly. He is in a band called Fíghnis, and was in a cèilidh band, the Tribes Céilí Band, until 2008. He composes some of his own music, including the tracks on his album The Grouse In The Heather.

He makes two different types of flutes, Pratten, where the upper middle and lower middle are in one piece, and Rudell & Rose, where the upper middle and lower middle are separated by a joint.

== Discography ==
Name	Label	Format
Floating Crowbar	GTD	Cassette
Cruaigh Pháraic	GTD	Cassette
Béal A' Mhurlaigh	Gael Linn	CD, Cassette and record
Feenish Legacy	Feenish Sound	Cassette
The Grouse In The Heather	Feenish Sound	CD
Rabharta	Feenish Sound	CD
