= Bill Whelan =

Irish composer and musician

- Born: William Michael Joseph Whelan; 22 May 1950 (age 76); Limerick, Ireland
- Genres: Irish traditional music; Celtic; folk; rock; classical; orchestral
- Occupations: Composer; musician; arranger; record producer; pianist
- Instruments: Piano
- Years active: 1970–present

William Michael Joseph Whelan (born 22 May 1950) is an Irish composer and musician. He is best known for composing a piece for the interval of the 1994 Eurovision Song Contest. The result, "Riverdance", was a seven-minute piece of original music accompanying a new take on traditional Irish stepdance that became a full-length stage production and spawned a worldwide craze for Irish traditional music and dance. The corresponding soundtrack album earned him a Grammy. "Riverdance" was released as a single in 1994, credited to "Bill Whelan and Anúna featuring the RTÉ Concert Orchestra". It reached number one in Ireland for 18 weeks and number nine in the UK. The album of the same title reached number 31 in the album charts in 1995.

Whelan has also arranged a symphonic suite version of Riverdance, with its premiere performed by the Ulster Orchestra on BBC Radio 3 in August 2014.

A studio recording was released on CD (on the RTÉ lyric fm label) in 2018.

Whelan is second cousin to British-Irish comedian, Jimmy Carr.

== Biography ==
Whelan is a native of Limerick city, and was educated at Crescent College. He gained his Bachelor of Civil Law degree at University College Dublin in 1973 and then went to King's Inns. In 2011, Whelan was awarded the UCD Foundation Day Medal in recognition of his outstanding achievements and his contribution to Irish music worldwide. While he is best known for his "Riverdance" composition and the theatrical show of the same name, Whelan has been involved in many ground-breaking projects in Ireland since the 1970s. In his autobiography, he especially mentions the major influence of James W. Flannery.

As a producer he has worked with U2 (on their War album), Van Morrison, Kate Bush, The Dubliners, Planxty, Andy Irvine & Davy Spillane, Patrick Street, Stockton's Wing and fellow Limerickman Richard Harris.

As an arranger and composer, his credits include:

- Original music (1989–1993) for fifteen W.B. Yeats plays (three per season), which were produced by James W. Flannery for the Yeats International Theatre Festival held at Dublin's Abbey Theatre each September during that period.
- The Seville Suite (1992), which was inspired by the exploits of Aodh Rua Ó Dónaill from The Battle of Kinsale in 1601 until his arrival in Galicia to the welcome of The Spanish Earl of Caraçena. In addition to the orchestra, The Seville Suite includes Celtic Music on Uilleann Pipes, accordion, bodhrán, fiddle as well as Galician harp, whistles and pipes.
- The Spirit of Mayo (1993) in honour of Mayo 5000. Performed by an 85-piece orchestra in Dublin's National Concert Hall and featuring a powerful Celtic drum corps and a 200 strong choir and choral group Anúna.
- The Connemara Suite (2009), features the Irish Chamber Orchestra along with soloists Zoë Conway, Morgan Crowley, Colin Dunne (Dance Percussion) and Fionnuala Hunt.

In theatre, Whelan received a Laurence Olivier Award nomination for his adaption of Gilbert and Sullivan's H.M.S. Pinafore. His film credits include, Dancing at Lughnasa (starring Meryl Streep), Some Mother's Son, Lamb (starring Liam Neeson) and the award-winning At The Cinema Palace.

== Career timeline ==
Whelan began his professional career in the 1970s, composing for film and performing with Irish rock and folk musicians before joining Planxty on keyboards in 1979. In the early 1980s he arranged and produced Johnny Logan's Eurovision-winning songs What's Another Year and Hold Me Now, and in 1981 co-composed Timedance with Dónal Lunny for the Eurovision interval performance by Planxty.

During the 1980s and early 1990s, Whelan worked as a producer, arranger and composer across rock, folk, theatre and film, including collaborations with U2, Van Morrison, Kate Bush, Andy Irvine, Davy Spillane, Stockton's Wing and Patrick Street. He also composed original music for the Yeats International Theatre Festival at the Abbey Theatre from 1989 to 1993, and wrote concert works including The Seville Suite, The Spirit of Mayo and The Connemara Suite. His 1986 nomination for a Laurence Olivier Award for his musical adaptation and arrangements of H.M.S. Pinafore at the Old Vic also dates from this period.

Whelan achieved international recognition in 1994 when he composed Riverdance for the interval segment of the Eurovision Song Contest, a work that developed into the stage show of the same name. He received the Grammy Award for Best Musical Show Album for Riverdance in 1997 and was granted the Freedom of the City of Limerick in 2001.

His later honours included an IMRO Lifetime Achievement Award in 2001, a Meteor Music Awards Lifetime Achievement Award in 2006, election to Aosdána in 2016, an honorary fellowship of RCSI in 2022, and publication of his autobiography The Road To Riverdance in the same year.

== Discography ==
As a keyboard player, or as an arranger, he has contributed to these albums:

- The Woman I Loved So Well (Planxty) (1980)
- Words & Music (Planxty) (1983)
- Miss America (Mary Margaret O'Hara) (1988)
- Irish Times (Patrick Street) (1990)
- Rude Awakening (Andy Irvine) (1991) Green Linnet Records
- East Wind (Andy Irvine & Davy Spillane) (1992) Tara Music
- The Seville Suite (various artists) (1992) Tara Music
- Riverdance: Music from the Show (various artists) (1995)
- The Best of Patrick Street (Patrick Street) (1995)
- Some Mother's Son (various artists) (1996)
- L'Imaginaire Irlandais (various artists) (1996)
- Roots of Riverdance (various artists) (1997)
- Dancing at Lughnasa (various artists) (1998)
- Riverdance on Broadway (various artists) (2000)
- Zoe Conway (Zoe Conway) (2002) Tara Music
- A Christmas Carol (various artists) (2007)
- The Connemara Suite (2008) Tara Music
- Riverdance A Symphonic Suite (2018)
