= Patrick Street (album) =

Studio album by Patrick Street
- Released: 1986
- Recorded: Landsdowne Studios, Dublin
- Genre: Irish folk music
- Length: 43:57
- Label: Green Linnet Records
- Producer: Dónal Lunny

Patrick Street chronology
| Patrick Street (1986) | No. 2 Patrick Street (1988) |

Patrick Street is the first studio album by the Irish folk band Patrick Street, released in 1986 on Green Linnet Records.

== Recording ==
It was produced and engineered by Dónal Lunny, and recorded at Landsdowne Studios, Dublin, Ireland.

The founding members Andy Irvine, Kevin Burke, Jackie Daly and Arty McGlynn were joined by Lunny on keyboards and bodhrán.

== Track listing ==
All tracks Traditional; arranged by Patrick Street; except where indicated

1. "Patrick Street"/"The Carraroe Jig" – 4:07
2. "Walter Sammon's Grandmother"/"Concertina Reel"/"Brendan McMahon's" – 4:16
3. "The Holy Ground" (song) (Gerry O'Beirne) – 5:39
4. "The Shores of Lough Gowna"/"Contentment is Wealth"/"Have a Drink with Me" – 5:01
5. "The Set"/"La Cardeuse" – 3:11
6. "Loftus Jones" – 3:31
7. "The Dream" (Andy Irvine) / "Indiana" (song) (Andy Mitchell) – 6:58
8. "Martin Rochford's Reel"/"Roll out the Barrel"/"The Earl's Chair" – 3:41
9. "Mrs O'Sullivan's Jig"/"Caliope House" (Dave Richardson) – 3:29
10. "The Man with the Cap" (Colum Sands) – 4:04

== Personnel ==
- Andy Irvine - vocals, mandolin, bouzouki, harmonica
- Kevin Burke - fiddle
- Jackie Daly - accordion
- Arty McGlynn - guitar
- Dónal Lunny - producer, keyboards, bodhrán
