= Irish Times (album) =

Studio album by Patrick Street
- Released: 1990
- Recorded: Windmill Lane Studios, Dublin
- Genre: Irish folk music
- Length: 42:50
- Label: Green Linnet / Topic Records
- Producers: Gerry O'Beirne & Patrick Street

Patrick Street chronology
No. 2 Patrick Street (1988)	Irish Times (1990)	All in Good Time (1993)

Irish Times is the third studio album by the Irish folk band Patrick Street, released in 1990 on Green Linnet and Special Delivery Records, a division of Topic Records.

Founding members Andy Irvine, Kevin Burke, Jackie Daly and Arty McGlynn were joined by Bill Whelan (keyboards), James Kelly (fiddle), Declan Masterson (uilleann pipes, low whistle, keyboards) and Gerry O'Beirne (vocals, guitar), who also contributed two songs. The album was produced by Gerry O'Beirne and Patrick Street, and recorded at Windmill Lane Studios, Dublin, Ireland.

== Track listing ==
All tracks Traditional; arranged by Patrick Street; except where indicated

1. "Music for a Found Harmonium" (Simon Jeffes, Penguin Café Ltd) – 2:38
2. "Brackagh Hill" (words: Traditional; music: Andy Irvine) – 5:48
3. "Brian O'Lynn"/"The Woods of Old Limerick" – 3:17
4. "Strokestown" (G. O'Beirne) – 4:45
5. "The Newmarket Polkas" – 3:32
6. "A Forgotten Hero" (Andy Irvine) – 6:02
7. "Doorus Hill" (J. Daly) / "The Rolling Reel/The Ballygrow Reel/Dennis Murphy's Reel" – 4:40
8. "In the Land of the Patagarang" (G. O'Beirne) – 4:20
9. "Boston O'Connor"/"John Gaffy's Fling"/"The Kerryman's Fling" – 3:40
10. "The Humours of the King of Ballyhooley" – 4:08

== Personnel ==
- Andy Irvine - vocals, mandolin, bouzouki, harmonica
- Kevin Burke - fiddle
- Jackie Daly - accordion
- Gerry O'Beirne - vocals, guitar
- James Kelly - fiddle
- Declan Masterson - uilleann pipes, low whistle, keyboards, bodhran
- Arty McGlynn - guitar
- Bill Whelan - keyboards
