= No. 2 Patrick Street =

Studio album by Patrick Street
- Released: 1988
- Recorded: Homestead Studios, Dublin
- Genre: Irish folk music
- Length: 39:03
- Label: Green Linnet Records
- Producer: Patrick Street

Patrick Street chronology
Patrick Street (1986)	No. 2 Patrick Street (1988)	Irish Times (1990)

No. 2 Patrick Street is the second studio album by the Irish folk band Patrick Street, released in 1988 on Green Linnet Records.

== Recording ==
It was recorded at Homestead Studios Dublin, Ireland, produced by the band and engineered by Enda Walsh, then remixed at Landsdowne Studios, also in Dublin, by Dónal Lunny and Andrew Boland.

The founding members Andy Irvine, Kevin Burke, Jackie Daly and Arty McGlynn were joined by Walsh on keyboards.

== Track listing ==
All tracks Traditional; arranged by Patrick Street; except where indicated

1. "John McKenna's Jigs" – 3:49
2. "Braes of Moneymore" (song) (words: Traditional; music: Patrick Street) – 3:49
3. "Hard By Seifin" (Roche Collection of Traditional Irish Music) / "Woodcock Hill" – 3:27
4. "Tom Joad" (song) (Woody Guthrie; new music: Andy Irvine) – 5:56
5. "Benton's Jig" (Jackie Daly) / "Benton's Dream" – 3:41
6. "William Taylor" (song) (Traditional; arranged by Patrick Street and Bill Whelan) – 3:08
7. "Carherlistrane Jig"/"Gallowglass Jig"/"Kanturk Jig" (Jackie Daly) Copyright Control – 3:32
8. "Jenny Picking Cockles"/"An Gabhrán"/"Jack Keane's Reel" – 3:33
9. "Facing The Chair" (song) (Andy Irvine) Published by Andy Irvine – 5:16
10. "Sweeney's Reel" (Jackie Daly) Copyright Control – 2:52

== Personnel ==
- Andy Irvine - vocals, mandolin, mandola, bouzouki, harmonica
- Kevin Burke - fiddle
- Jackie Daly - accordion
- Arty McGlynn - guitar
- Enda Walsh - keyboards
