= Arty McGlynn =

Irish guitarist (1944–2019)

Arty McGlynn (7 August 1944 – 18 December 2019) was an Irish guitarist born in Omagh, County Tyrone. In addition to his solo work, he collaborated with different notable groups such as Patrick Street, Planxty, Four Men and a Dog, De Dannan and the Van Morrison Band. The song I Want Tomorrow by Enya which in fact was her first single, features a guitar solo played by him. He played guitar on the critically acclaimed 1989 Van Morrison album, Avalon Sunset. He also played duo performances and recordings with uilleann piper Liam O'Flynn, and his wife, fiddle player Nollaig Casey.

== Discography ==
=== Solo ===
- McGlynn's Fancy (1994 / originally released in 1979)
- Celtic Airs (2000) [A re-release of McGlynn's Fancy]

=== With Van Morrison ===
- Inarticulate Speech of the Heart (1983)
- Avalon Sunset (1989)
- Days Like This (1995)

=== With Enya ===
- The Celts (1986)

=== With Patrick Street ===
- Patrick Street (1986)
- No. 2 Patrick Street (1988)
- Irish Times (1990)
- All in Good Time (1993)

=== With Paddy Keenan ===
- Poirt an Phíobaire (1983)

=== With Cathal Hayden and Johnny "Ringo" McDonagh ===
- Handed Down (1981)

=== With Christy Moore ===
- Ordinary Man (1989)

=== With Nollaig Casey ===
- Lead the Knave (1989)
- Causeway (1995)
- The music of what happened (2004)
- Traditional Irish Jigs, Reels and Airs (2005) [A re-release of Lead the Knave]

=== With Liam O'Flynn ===
- Out to an Other Side (1993)
- The Given Note (1995)
- The Piper's Call (1999)

=== With Frankie Gavin & Aidan Coffey ===
- Irlande (1994)

=== With Alan Kelly ===
- Mosaic (2001)

=== With John Carty ===
- Yeh, That's All It Is (2001)
- At It Again (2003)
- John Carty & Brian Rooney (2011)

=== With Matt Molloy and John Carty ===
- Pathway to the Well (2007)
- Out of the Ashes (2016)

=== With Noel Hill ===
- The Irish Concertina Two (2005)
