= Neil Dorfsman =

American record producer

- Born: Neil Eric Dorfsman; May 31, 1952 (age 74); New York City, New York, United States
- Occupations: Record producer; audio engineer; mixer
- Years active: 1977−present
- Website: neildorfsman.com

Neil Dorfsman (born May 31, 1952) is an American sound engineer and record producer, best known for his work with Dire Straits, Bruce Hornsby, Mark Knopfler, Paul McCartney and Sting. He won Grammy Awards for Best Producer for Bruce Hornsby's Scenes from the Southside (1988) and Sting's ...Nothing Like the Sun (1987), a Grammy Award for Best Engineer for Dire Straits' Brothers in Arms (1985), as well as a nomination for Best Engineer for Dire Straits's Love Over Gold (1982). Further, he recorded two tracks on Sting's Brand New Day (1999), which won a Grammy Award for Best Pop Album. He mixed the East Village Opera Company's Olde School, which received a Grammy Nomination for Best Classical Crossover Album in 2009. In 1988 and 1998, Dorfsman won a TEC Award for Engineer of the Year.

Other popular artists Dorfsman has worked with include Björk, Paul Brady, Def Leppard, Bonnie Tyler, They Might Be Giants, Richie Sambora, and Tears for Fears.

Dorfsman was born in Manhattan and grew up on Long Island. His career began at Electric Lady Studios in 1977, where he was trained by Eddie Kramer. After two years, he moved to Power Station Studios, where he became a staff engineer in 1979. His big break came in May, when he was assigned to take over for Bob Clearmountain, who had a prior commitment, on Bruce Springsteen's fifth studio album. One year and 60+ songs later, the recording was finally completed for the double album, The River.

In the last decade, Dorfsman has made his residence in the San Diego area of California.

== Selected works ==
Neil Dorfsman has worked on over 300 albums

- 2014 The Album Collection, Vol. 1: 1973-1984 - Bruce Springsteen - Engineer
- 2013 The Complete Album Collection, Vol. 1 - Bob Dylan - Engineer
- 2012 Grégoire Maret - Grégoire Maret - Mixing
- 2012 Live/Stone Blue - Foghat - Remixing
- 2011 The Best of 25 Years - Sting - Mixing, Producer
- 2011 Wonderland - Original Broadway Cast - Engineer, Mixing
- 2010 De Mares y Visiones: Canciones de Una Década - Manolo García - Mixing
- 2010 The Collection 1973-84 - Bruce Springsteen - Engineer
- 2009 Animal Grace/Walking Through Fire - April Wine - Mixing
- 2009 Great Vacation, Vol. 1: Super Best of Glay - Glay - Mixing
- 2009 Greatest Hits - Bruce Springsteen - Engineer
- 2009 Handel's Messiah Rocks - Joyful Noise - Engineer
- 2009 No Surrender - Kane - Engineer
- 2008 Ikons - Kiss - Engineer
- 2008 Olde School - The East Village Opera Company - Mixing
- 2008 Revolutions in Sound: Warner Bros. Records - The First 50 Years - Producer
- 2008 Saldremos a la Lluvia - Manolo García - Mixing
- 2008 The Other Side of Me - Linda Eder - Engineer
- 2007 In the Moment- Bob Mintzer - Engineer
- 2007 Volta - Björk - Engineer, Mixing
- 2006 Kiss Alive! 1975-2000 - Kiss - Engineering
- 2006 Révérence - Henri Salvador - Engineer, Mixing
- 2006 Soapbox Heroes - Enter the Haggis - Engineer, Mixing, Producer
- 2006 Surrounded - Björk - Engineer
- 2005 From the Ground Up - Antigone Rising - Engineer, Mixing, Producer
- 2005 Private Investigations: The Best of Dire Straits & Mark Knopfler - Dire Straits - Producer
- 2005 Romeo Rodney - Rodney Dangerfield - Engineer, Mixing
- 2005 The Best of Bob Dylan - Bob Dylan - Engineer
- 2005 The East Village Opera Company - The East Village Opera Company - Engineer, Producer
- 2004 All the Best - Tina Turner - Producer
- 2004 Dedication/On the Line - Gary "U.S." Bonds - Engineer, Mixing
- 2004 Everybody Loves a Happy Ending - Tears for Fears - Engineer
- 2004 Faster Than the Speed of Night/Secret Dreams & Forbidden Fire - Bonnie Tyler- Engineer, Mixing
- 2004 Greatest Radio Hits - Bruce Hornsby - Producer
- 2004 Medúlla - Björk - Engineer
- 2003 Late Harvest - Serah - Engineer
- 2003 Songs of Love - Sting - Composer
- 2003 That Great Love Sound [UK CD] - The Raveonettes - Engineer
- 2003 The Chain Gang of Love - The Raveonettes - Engineer
- 2003 The Essential Bruce Springsteen - Bruce Springsteen - Engineer
- 2002 Anthology - Carly Simon - Engineer
- 2002 At the Movies - Sting - Mixing, Producer
- 2002 Beyond Words - Bobby McFerrin - Engineer, Mixing
- 2002 Favorite Enemy - Eman - Engineer, Mixing
- 2002 Happy Times Ten - Hampton the Hampster - Engineer, Mixing
- 2002 Nobody Knows: The Best of Paul Brady[Compass] - Paul Brady - Engineer, Mixing, Percussion, Producer
- 2002 The Edge of Silence - Solas - Arranger, Engineer, Mixing, Producer
- 2001 Back to the Island: Reggae From Martha's Vineyard - Engineer
- 2000 A Collection: Step by Step/Paradox- Steps Ahead - Engineer
- 2000 Best of Art Farmer in the CTI Years - Art Farmer - Engineer
- 2000 Brand New Day: The Remixes - Sting - Engineer
- 2000 Make It Beautiful - Sara Lee - Mixing
- 1999 Brand New Day - Sting - Engineer
- 1999 Falling Forward - Willy Porter - Engineer, Mixing, Producer
- 1998 Black Progress: The Formative Years, Vol. 2 - Bob Marley - Remixing
- 1998 Fairytales - Divine - Engineer
- 1998 Greatest Hits - Gato Barbieri - Engineer
- 1998 Mixed Blessing - William Topley - Producer
- 1998 Sultans of Swing: The Very Best of Dire Straits - Dire Straits - Producer
- 1997 One Step Up/Two Steps Back: The Songs of Bruce Springsteen - Engineer
- 1997 Senegal Moon - Serah - Engineer, Mixing, Producer
- 1997 The Best of T-Connection: Everything's Still Cool - T-Connection - Engineer, Mixing
- 1997 The Very Best of Sting & the Police - The Police - Mixing, Producer
- 1996 Out of the Wind - Serah - Engineer, Mixing
- 1996 Bigmouth - Bigmouth - Producer, Engineer, Mixing
- 1996 Super Best of Casiopea - Casiopea - Engineer
- 1995 (What's the Story) Morning Glory? - Oasis - multichannel mixing (SACD version)
- 1995 A Testimonial Dinner: The Songs of XTC - XTC - Engineer
- 1995 Cinderella: Tribute to a Classic - Disney - Engineer
- 1995 Dog Eared Dream - Willy Porter - Engineer, Mixing, Overdubs, Remixing
- 1995 Greatest Hits - Bruce Springsteen - Engineer
- 1995 Regarding the Soul - Dee Carstensen - Arranger, Engineer, Mixing, Producer
- 1995 The Strangers - The Strangers - Mixing
- 1994 Fields of Gold: The Best of Sting 1984-1994 - Sting - Mixing, Producer
- 1994 The Collected Recordings: Sixties to Nineties - Tina Turner - Producer
- 1993 On the Night - Dire Straits - Engineer, Mixing, Producer
- 1993 Screenplaying - Mark Knopfler - Engineer
- 1992 Pretty Vultures - Ten Inch Men - Engineer, Producer
- 1992 Songs & Crazy Dreams - Paul Brady - Mixing, Producer
- 1991 On Every Street - Dire Straits - Mixing (1–6, 8–11)
- 1991 Prince of the Deep Water - The Blessing - Engineer, Mixing, Producer
- 1991 Stranger in This Town - Richie Sambora - Producer
- 1990 Trick or Treat - Paul Brady - Mixing
- 1989 Circle Back Home - Tom Kimmel - Engineer, Mixing, Producer
- 1989 Coming in for the Kill - Climie Fisher - Engineer, Producer
- 1989 Flowers in the Dirt - Paul McCartney - Engineer, Mixing, Producer
- 1989 Greenpeace: Rainbow Warriors [#1] - Producer
- 1989 Strange Angels - Laurie Anderson - Mixing
- 1989 The Original Hits - Sylvester - Engineer
- 1988 ...Nada Como el Sol - Sting - Producer
- 1988 Blues for Buddha - The Silencers - Mixing
- 1988 Colin James - Colin James - Mixing
- 1988 Everything's Different Now - 'Til Tuesday - Mixing
- 1988 Greatest Hits [Arista]- Air Supply - Mixing
- 1988 Land of Dreams - Randy Newman - Engineer
- 1988 Money for Nothing - Dire Straits - Producer
- 1988 Scenes from the Southside - Bruce Hornsby & the Range - Engineer, Mixing, Producer
- 1988 Walking through Fire - April Wine- Mixing Engineer
- 1987 Coming Around Again - Carly Simon - Engineer
- 1987 Englishman in New York: The Ben Liebrand Mix - Sting - Producer
- 1987 Jude Cole - Jude Cole - Engineer, Mixing
- 1987 Lolita Pop - Lolita Pop - Mixing
- 1987 Mercy - Steve Jones - Engineer
- 1987 Nothing Like the Sun - Sting - Mixing, Producer
- 1986 Daring Adventures - Richard Thompson - Engineer, Mixing
- 1986 Secret Dreams & Forbidden Fire - Bonnie Tyler - Mixing
- 1986 Rock for Amnesty - Producer
- 1986 True for You - Paul Brady - Engineer, Mixing, Percussion, Producer
- 1986 Whiplash Smile - Billy Idol - Engineer
- 1985 Boys and Girls - Bryan Ferry - Engineer
- 1985 Brothers in Arms - Dire Straits - Engineer, Producer
- 1984 Cal - Mark Knopfler - Engineer
- 1984 Emotion - Barbra Streisand - Engineer
- 1983 Faster Than the Speed of Night - Bonnie Tyler - Engineer, Mixing
- 1983 Hello Big- Man - Carly Simon - Engineer
- 1983 Infidels - Bob Dylan - Engineer
- 1983 Lonely at Night - Orphan - Engineer
- 1983 Love Over and Over - Kate & Anna McGarrigle - Engineer
- 1982 Ignition - John Waite - Assistant Engineer
- 1982 Love Over Gold - Dire Straits - Engineer
- 1982 On the Line - Gary "U.S." Bonds - Engineer
- 1982 Smokin' in the Pit - Steps Ahead - Engineer, Mixing
- 1982 The Philip Lynott Album - Phil Lynott - Mixing
- 1981 Chances Are - Bob Marley & the Wailers - Engineer, Remixing
- 1981 Dedication - Gary "U.S." Bonds - Engineer
- 1981 Wanderlust - Mike Mainieri - Engineer, Mixing
- 1980 Carnaval - Spyro Gyra - Engineer
- 1980 Diana - Diana Ross - Engineer
- 1980 Manhattan Update - Warren Bernhardt - Engineer
- 1980 The River - Bruce Springsteen - Engineer
- 1979 La Cuna - Ray Barretto - Engineer, Mixing
- 1979 Yama - Art Farmer - Engineer
- 1978 Heavy Metal Be-Bop - The Brecker Brothers - Assistant Engineer
- 1978 Jorge Santana - Jorge Santana - Assistant Engineer
- 1978 Stone Blue - Foghat - Remixing
- 1978 The Captain's Journey - Lee Ritenour - Assistant Engineer
- 1977 Alive II- Kiss - Assistant Engineer
- 1977 Love Eyes - Art Webb - Assistant Engineer

Soundtracks

- 2000 Dolphins [Original Soundtrack] - Producer
- 1995 The Living Sea [Soundtrack from the IMAX film] - Producer
- 1995 The Mighty Morphin Power Rangers [Original Soundtrack] - Mixing, Producer
- 1994 Four Weddings and a Funeral - Original Soundtrack - Producer
- 1992 Hellraiser III: Hell on Earth [Soundtrack] - Randy Miller - Producer
- 1991 Backdraft [RCA]- Hans Zimmer - Producer
- 1989 She-Devil “Always” [Original Soundtrack] - Producer, Mixing
- 1984 Footloose [Original Soundtrack] - Associate Producer, Mixing
- 1983 Local Hero [Original Soundtrack] - Mark Knopfler - Engineer

Box Sets/Catalogs

- 2014 The Album Collection, Vol. 1: 1973-1984 - Bruce Springsteen - Engineer
- 2013 The Complete Album Collection, Vol. 1 - Bob Dylan - Engineer
- 2012 The Complete Arista Albums Collection - The Brecker Brothers - Mixing
- 2011 The Complete Columbia Albums Collection - Wayne Shorter - Engineer
- 2010 The Collection 1973-84 - Bruce Springsteen - Engineer
- 2008 Greatest Hits [Steel Box Collection] - Bonnie Tyler - Engineer
- 2005 The Collection, Vol. 3: Blonde on Blonde/Blood on the Tracks/Infidels - Bob Dylan - Engineer
- 2003 Bob Dylan [Limited Edition Hybrid SACD Set] - Bob Dylan- Engineer
- 1998 Tracks - Bruce Springsteen - Engineer
