= Betsy Cook =

American singer-songwriter

- Origin: Mayfield, Kentucky, U.S.
- Genres: Pop; rock; folk rock
- Occupations: Songwriter; vocalist; musician
- Instruments: Keyboards; piano; vocals; accordion; flute; saxophone
- Years active: 1979–present
- Label: EastWest (Warner Music)

Betsy Cook is an American-born singer, songwriter and musician. Since the late 1970s, she has worked mainly in the United Kingdom and collaborated with various British artists such as Gerry Rafferty, Ray Jackson, Lindisfarne, George Michael, Paul Young, Seal and Marc Almond. She later became affiliated with the producer Trevor Horn and worked on several of his projects in the late 1980s and early 1990s before releasing her own album, The Girl Who Ate Herself, in 1992. As a songwriter, Cook was nominated for a Grammy Award in 1988 for the song "Telling Me Lies".

== Career ==
Cook worked for many years as a session musician and backing vocalist for a variety of artists. Her earliest work was with Gerry Rafferty, providing backing vocals on his 1979 album Night Owl. The album was produced by the London-born producer Hugh Murphy, whom Cook married. The album also featured contributions from Richard Thompson and his wife Linda Thompson, with whom Cook would begin a working relationship. The same year, she also worked on albums by Mike Heron and the singer/comedian Richard Digance. Cook would work with Rafferty again as a backing vocalist on his 1980 album Snakes and Ladders, and as backing vocalist and keyboard player on Ray Jackson's "In The Night" album that year, again produced by Hugh Murphy. In 1981, Cook worked as a session musician for Bonnie Tyler and Sally Oldfield, and also for Irish singer-songwriter Paul Brady, playing various keyboard instruments on his album Hard Station, which was also produced by Hugh Murphy. Cook would work with Brady again on his 1983 album True for You, on his 1984 live album Full Moon and again on his 1991 album Trick or Treat.

Cook and Linda Thompson began writing songs together in the 1980s, and Thompson's 1985 solo album One Clear Moment contained eight tracks that were written by or co-written with Cook.

Cook also began recording her own material in 1984-1985 when she co-produced the tracks "Nothing Ventured" and "Wonderland" with husband Hugh Murphy at the UK's Birdland Studios. Although without her own recording deal at the time, "Wonderland" was later covered by the British singer Paul Young for his 1986 album Between Two Fires which Cook worked on as a backing vocalist. The track was released as the first single from the album and reached the UK Top 30.

Also in 1986, Cook began what would be a longterm working relationship with producer Trevor Horn and his associate Stephen Lipson by providing backing vocals on the second Frankie Goes To Hollywood album Liverpool.

Cook then collaborated with George Michael by playing keyboards on his hugely successful debut solo album Faith, which was released in 1987.

In 1988, Cook appeared with Linda Thompson at the Grammy Awards performing the song "Telling Me Lies" which was originally written by them for Thompson's 1985 album One Clear Moment. The song had been nominated for a Grammy Award for Best Country Song after it had been covered by Linda Ronstadt, Dolly Parton and Emmylou Harris collectively for their platinum-selling album Trio in 1987. The "Trio" version of the song had already been a Top 3 hit on the Billboard Country Singles Chart.

In 1988, Cook once again worked with Gerry Rafferty, playing electric piano on his album North and South. She also returned to working with Horn and Lipson the same year when she worked as a session musician on Laughter, Tears and Rage, the debut album by Act and also on The Power of Six album by the vocal group Mint Juleps.

Cook later worked with the singer Marc Almond, providing keyboards and backing vocals on his 1990 album Enchanted. She would work with Almond again on his 1991 album Tenement Symphony, produced by Trevor Horn.

By this time, Cook had begun working on her own album of material that Horn, Lipson and Bruce Woolley were co-producing with her. Ian Stanley (formerly of the band Tears For Fears and now a successful producer himself) was also enlisted. The resulting album, The Girl Who Ate Herself, was released in 1992, preceded by the single "Love Is The Groove". The two tracks that Cook had recorded in the mid-1980s with husband Hugh Murphy ("Nothing Ventured" and "Wonderland") were also included, although additional production and instrumentation were added to the final versions on the album. Further singles "How Can I Believe?" and "Docklands" were released from the album.

Cook continued to work with Horn and his associates, and was a session musician on Seal's 1994 album which Horn produced. She also co-wrote the track "Storm", which was recorded by Grace Jones and was co-written and co-produced by Bruce Woolley for the soundtrack album to the 1998 film version of The Avengers.

Previously unreleased material that Cook had co-written and recorded with Linda Thompson in the 1980s was released on Thompson's 1996 collection Dreams Fly Away - A History of Linda Thompson and on her 2001 collection Give Me A Sad Song.

=== Songwriter ===
Many of Cook's songs have been covered by other artists:

"Telling Me Lies", which Cook co-wrote with Linda Thompson for Thompson's 1985 album One Clear Moment, was covered by Linda Ronstadt, Dolly Parton and Emmylou Harris for their platinum-selling album Trio in 1987. The song reached #3 on the US Billboard Country Singles Chart and was also nominated for a Grammy Award for Best Country Song in 1988.

"Insult To Injury", which Cook also co-wrote with Linda Thompson was later covered by Fairport Convention at their 25th Anniversary concert which was released on record and video in 1994.

"Love Is The Groove", which was Cook's first single in 1992 and written by herself and Bruce Woolley, was covered by Cher on her 1998 album Believe.

"Cry Of A Waking Heart", which was also co-written by Cook with Bruce Woolley, was recorded by Donna Summer for her 1991 album Mistaken Identity.

"Docklands" was Cook's third single, written by herself and Trevor Horn, and released in 1992. However, it was first recorded by the a cappella soul group Mint Juleps for their 1988 album The Power Of Six (which was produced by Horn and on which Cook performed as a musician and vocals arranger). After Cook's version had been released, it was then later covered by Stevie Nicks for her 1994 album Street Angel.

== Discography ==
=== Albums ===
- The Girl Who Ate Herself (1992)

=== Singles ===
- "Love Is the Groove" (1992) UK no. 88
- "How Can I Believe?" (1992) UK no. 127
- "Docklands" (1992) UK no. 142
