= Back to the Centre =

Studio album by Paul Brady
- Released: 1986
- Genre: Pop rock; folk
- Label: Mercury; PeeBee Music
- Producer: Ian Maidman

Paul Brady chronology
True for You (1983)	Back to the Centre (1986)	Full Moon (1986)

Back to the Centre is the fourth studio album by the Irish singer-songwriter Paul Brady, released in 1986. Eric Clapton was a guest guitarist.

== Track listing ==
1. "Walk the White Line" - 5:05
2. "Wheel of Heartbreak" - 5:09
3. "Deep in Your Heart" - 6:01
4. "To Be the One" - 4:50
5. "Follow On" - 4:16
6. "Soulbeat" - 4:51
7. "Airwaves" - 4:46
8. "The Island" - 5:28
9. "The Homes of Donegal" (Seán McBride) - 7:29

At the album's recording, Brady also played and sang an arrangement of the traditional song "The Green Fields of Canada", which had been released that year on the Feed The Folk album, which aimed to raise funds for Ethiopian famine relief.

== Personnel ==
- Paul Brady - vocals, guitar, bouzouki, keyboards, percussion, tin whistle
- Ian Maidman - Overall production, bass, percussion, guitar, backing vocals
- Eric Clapton, Phil Palmer - guitar
- Larry Mullen, Jr., Liam Genockey, Ole Romo - drums
- Betsy Cook, Kenny Craddock - keyboards
- Mitt Gamon - harmonica
- Loudon Wainwright - backing vocals
- Phil Saatchi - backing vocals
