= Nobody Knows: The Best of Paul Brady =

Greatest hits album by Paul Brady
- Released: 1999/2002
- Genre: Folk rock, rock
- Label: Rykodisc

Paul Brady chronology
Spirits Colliding (1995)	Nobody Knows: The Best of Paul Brady (1999)	Oh What a World (2000)

Nobody Knows: The Best of Paul Brady is a compilation album by Irish singer/songwriter Paul Brady, his second. First released in 1999 by Rykodisc, it was re-released in 2002 by Compass Records. It contains new recordings of two songs that appeared on earlier albums: "The Lakes of Pontchartrain", from Brady's 1978 record Welcome Here Kind Stranger, and "Arthur McBride", which Andy Irvine and Paul Brady included on their eponymous recording from 1976.

== Track listing ==
1. "Nobody Knows"
2. "World Is What You Make It"
3. "Paradise Is Here"
4. "Nothing But The Same Old Story"
5. "The Lakes of Pontchartrain"
6. "Trick Or Treat"
7. "Trust In You"
8. "Not The Only One"
9. "The Island"
10. "Crazy Dreams"
11. "Follow On"
12. "Just In Time"
13. "The Homes of Donegal"
14. "Arthur McBride"
