= The Recruiting Serjeant =

1770 burletta by Charles Dibdin and Isaac Bickerstaff

Oh, What a Charming Thing's a Battle!
"Oh, What a Charming Thing's a Battle!", from Charles Dibdin and Isaac Bickerstaff's The Recruiting Serjeant (1770). Sung by Leon Lishner

The Recruiting Serjeant is a burletta by composer Charles Dibdin and playwright Isaac Bickerstaff. It premièred on 20 July 1770 at Ranelagh Gardens, London.

== Roles ==
Role	Premiere cast, 20 July 1770
Serjeant	Charles Bannister
Countryman	Charles Dibdin
His wife	Mrs. Wrighten
His mother	Mrs. Dorman

== Synopsis ==
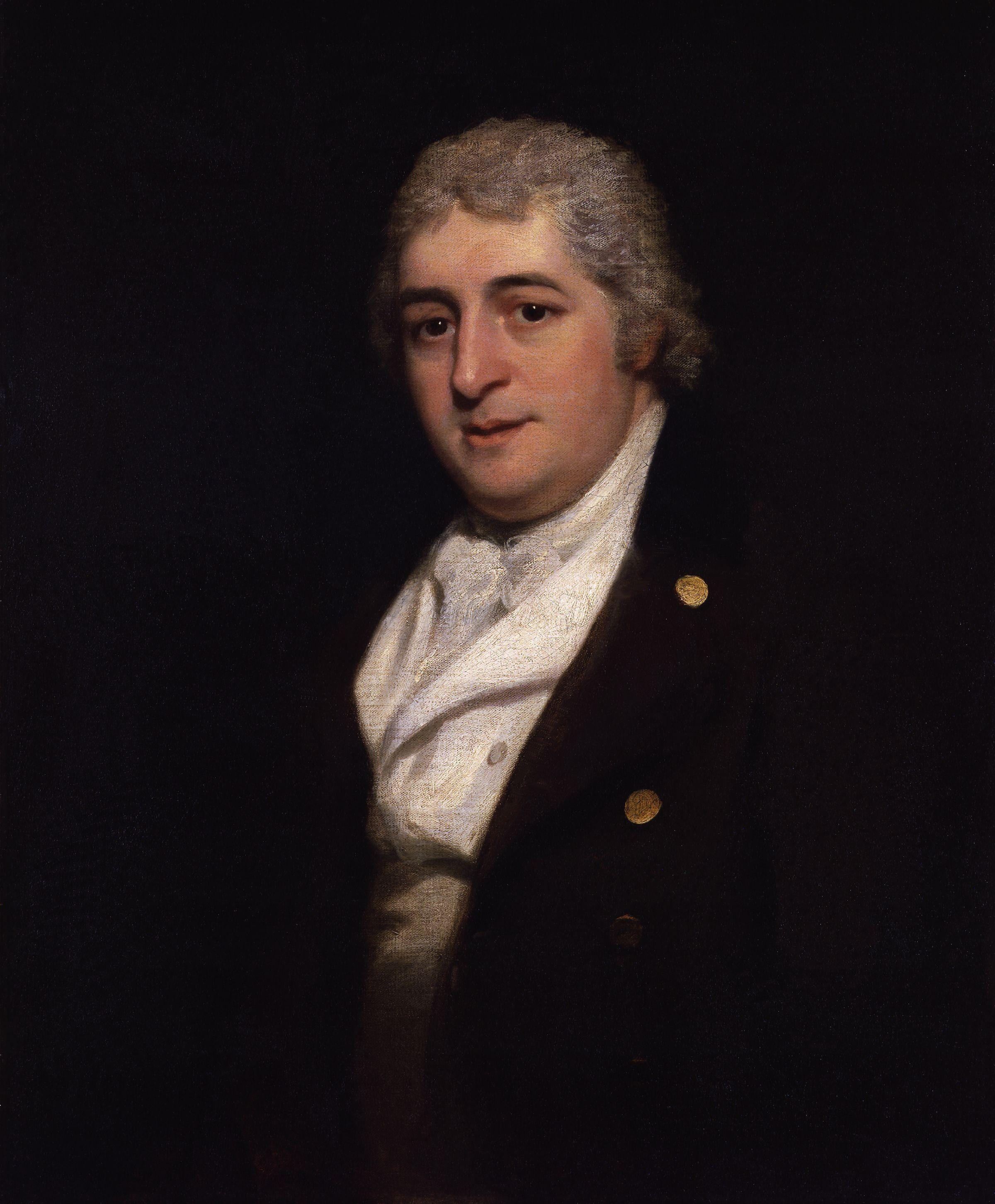
Composer Charles Dibdin in 1799

A recruiting sergeant comes to a village seeking out new recruits. A countryman, Joe, living with his wife and mother, hears his stirring cry, and decides to enlist. The two women in his life seek to dissuade him, and follow him in when he meets with the sergeant. The sergeant is pleased to find a recruit, but Joe's mother begins cursing the sergeant out for trying to take her son away.

This too fails to dissuade either of them. The mother fetches his children from the house, and appeals to Joe not to leave them, and thus risk all of them ending up in the workhouse. The sergeant starts to sign the man on, but Joe hesitates, asking for information about army life. They talk about women's love of the uniform, and when he asks about battles, sergeant explains "what a charming thing's a battle", cheerily describing everyone's gory death. ("Heads, and limbs, and bullets flying / Then the groans of soldiers dying ...")

This terrifies the women, but Joe simply asks whether it is likely he himself will lose his head or limbs. "Not if you've good luck", says the sergeant. Joe begins to have second thoughts at this – he had wished to see a battle, but he has decided the sergeant's description of it is quite sufficient. His wife and mother are delighted – and then Joe explains the whole thing was revenge upon his wife for nagging him the night before when he wanted to go to the alehouse. She promises not to do so again, and they reconcile. The play ends with the sergeant buying Joe a drink, and all toasting King George.

== See also ==
- Arthur McBride

== Bibliography ==
- The Recruiting Serjeant, reproduced in Collection of the Most Esteemed Farces and Entertainments Performed on the British Stage. Published by C. Elliot, 1788. Digitised on May 25, 2007, by Harvard University, hosted by Google. Access date: 29 August 2008.
