= Tankard =

Drinking vessel

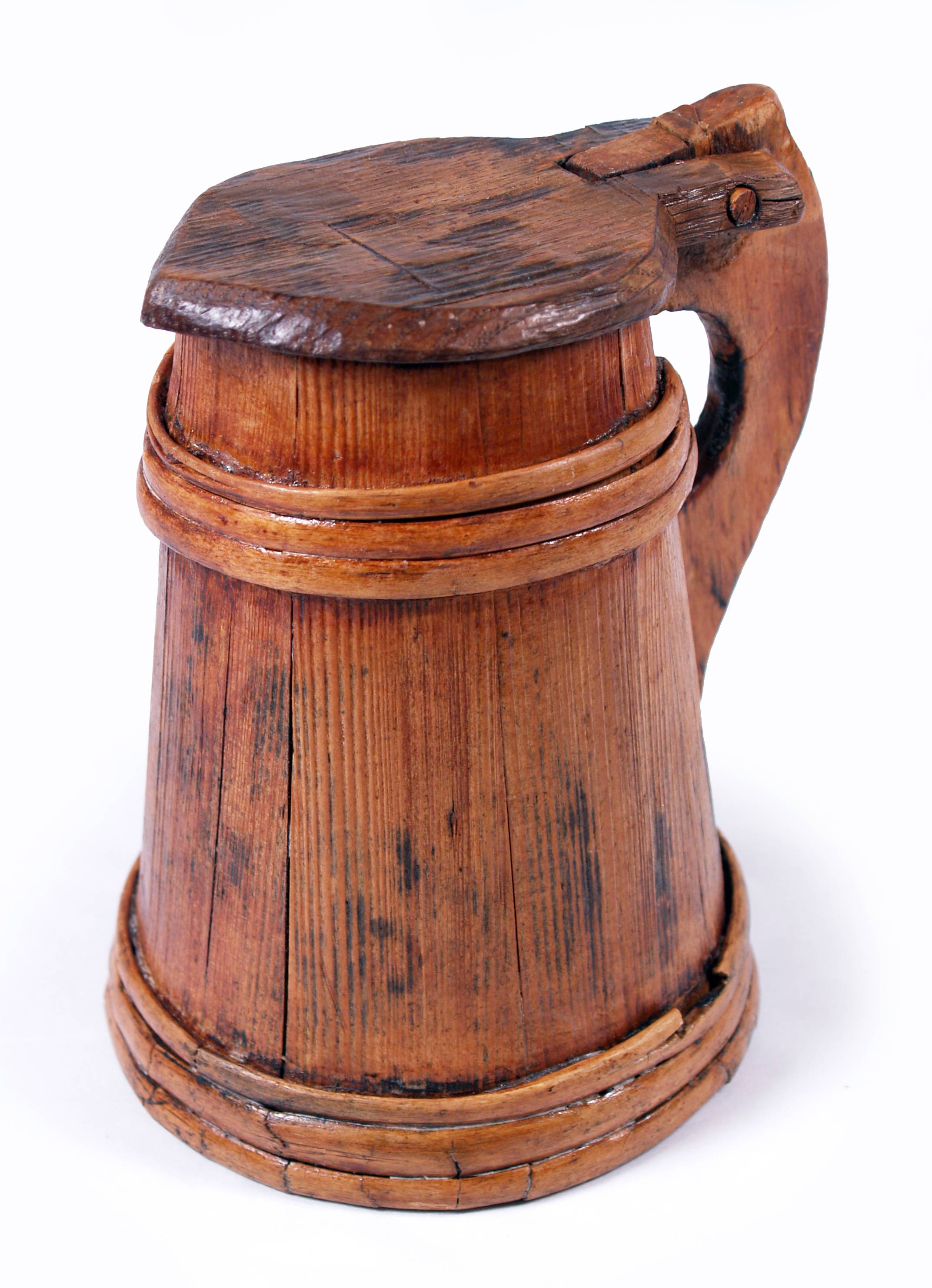
A wooden tankard found on board the 16th-century carrack Mary Rose

A tankard is a form of drinkware consisting of a large, roughly cylindrical, drinking cup with a single handle. In recent centuries tankards were typically made of silver or pewter, but they can be made of other materials, for example glass, wood, pottery, or boiled leather. A tankard may have a hinged lid, and tankards featuring glass bottoms are also fairly common. Beer steins have a similar shape and use.

== Wooden tankards ==
The word "tankard" originally meant any wooden vessel (13th century) and later came to mean a drinking vessel. The earliest tankards were made of wooden staves, similar to a barrel, and did not have lids. A 2000-year-old wooden tankard of approximately four-pint capacity has been unearthed in Wales.

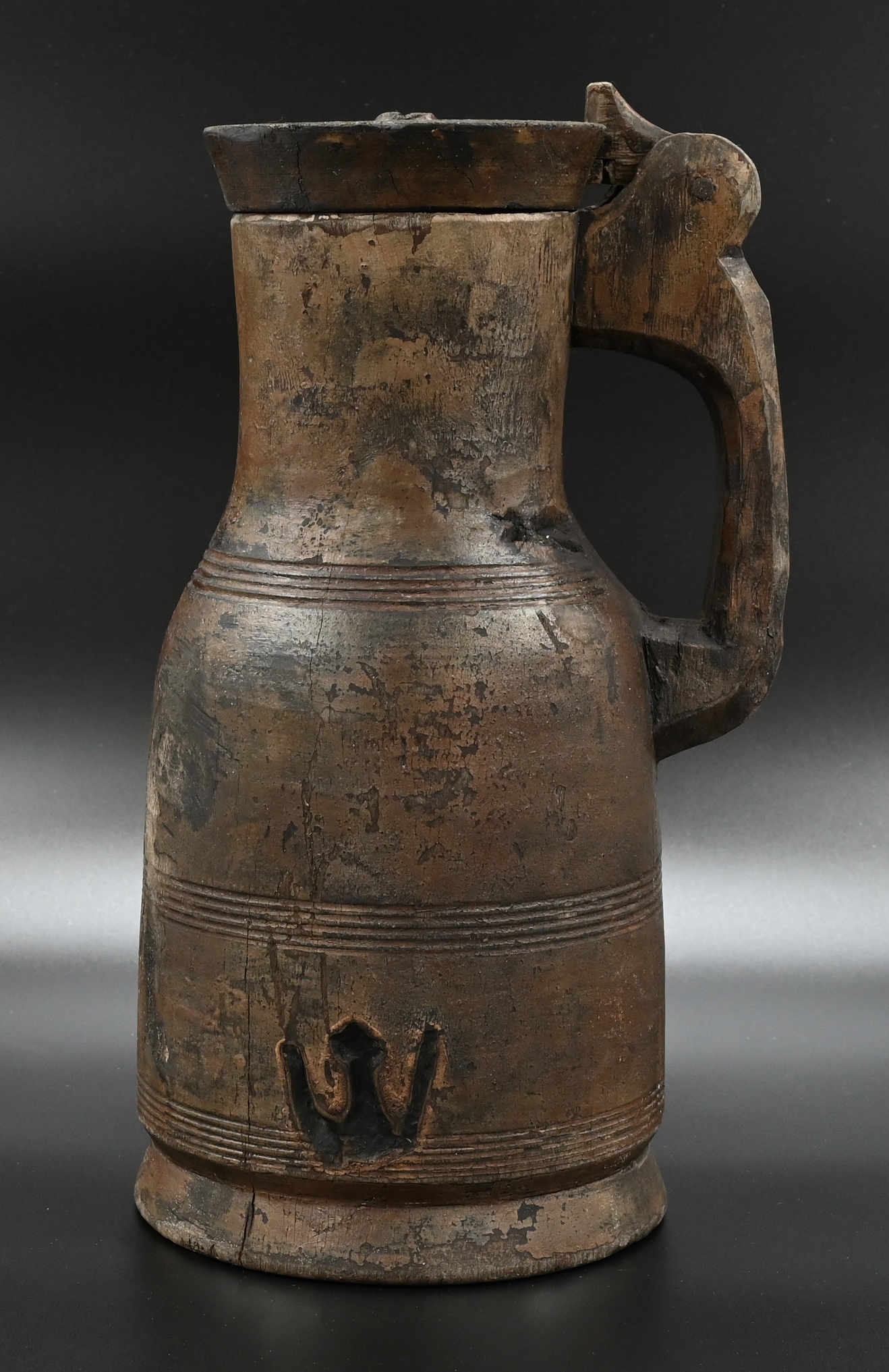
Tankard recovered from Gribshunden shipwreck (1495)

A late medieval example of a fine tankard milled from alder wood was recovered by underwater archaeologists excavating the wreck of the royal Danish-Norwegian flagship, Gribshunden which sank in 1495. When excavated, the tankard's lid was still securely in place, and gas from the degradation of the medieval beverage was trapped inside.

== Glass bottoms ==
Metal tankards often come with a glass bottom. The legend is that the glass-bottomed tankard was developed as a way of refusing the King's shilling, i.e., conscription into the British Army or Navy. The drinker could see the coin in the bottom of the glass and refuse the drink, thereby avoiding conscription. However, this is likely a fable since the Navy could press by force, rendering deception unnecessary.

A further story is that the glass bottom merely allowed the drinker to judge the clarity of their drink while forgoing the expense of a fragile pint glass.

Glass bottoms are sometimes retrofitted to antique tankards, reducing their value and authenticity.

== Conversions ==
Covered tankards fell out of fashion in 19th-century England resulting in a number of them being converted to other roles such as jugs.

== Modern tankards ==
Metal and ceramic tankards are still manufactured but are regarded as specialty or novelty items. Modern metal tankards are often engraved to commemorate some occasion. Glass tankards—that is, straight-sided or inward-sloping glass vessels with strap handles—are still in everyday use.

== Lead leaching from pewter ==
In previous centuries, the pewter used to make tankards often contained lead, which exposed the drinker to medical effects, ranging from heavy metal poisoning to gout. This effect was exacerbated in cider-drinking areas —such as Somerset— as the acidity of the cider leached the lead from the pewter more quickly. Clay tankards became prevalent in this area. Pewter is now widely lead-free.

== In popular culture ==
A 1970s TV advertising campaign for Whitbread beer features a pub landlord spinning a tall tale to an American tourist, who suspiciously asks: "Are you really Lord Tankard?"

In season 3, episode 3 of the sitcom Cheers, Frasier Crane says to his bartender friend Sam: "Well, I’ll have a tanker of your finest lager."

== Gallery ==
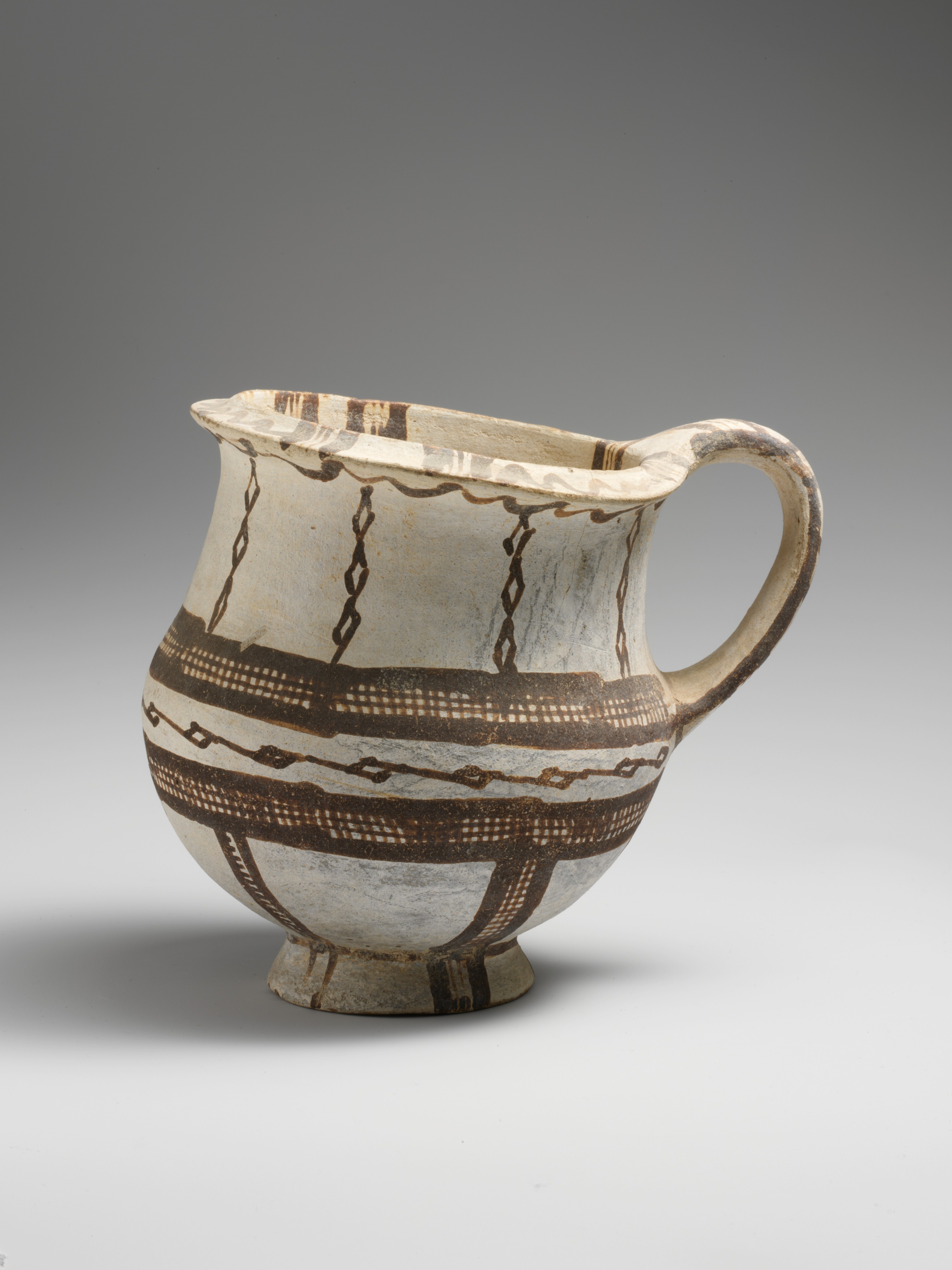
A white slipware tankard from Cyprus, c. 1600–1150 B.C.

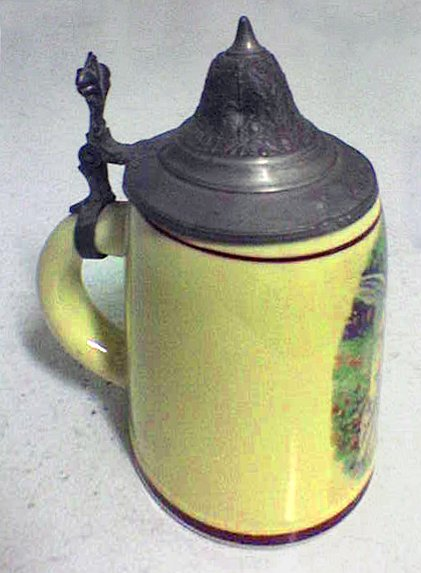
Little ceramic tankard with lid

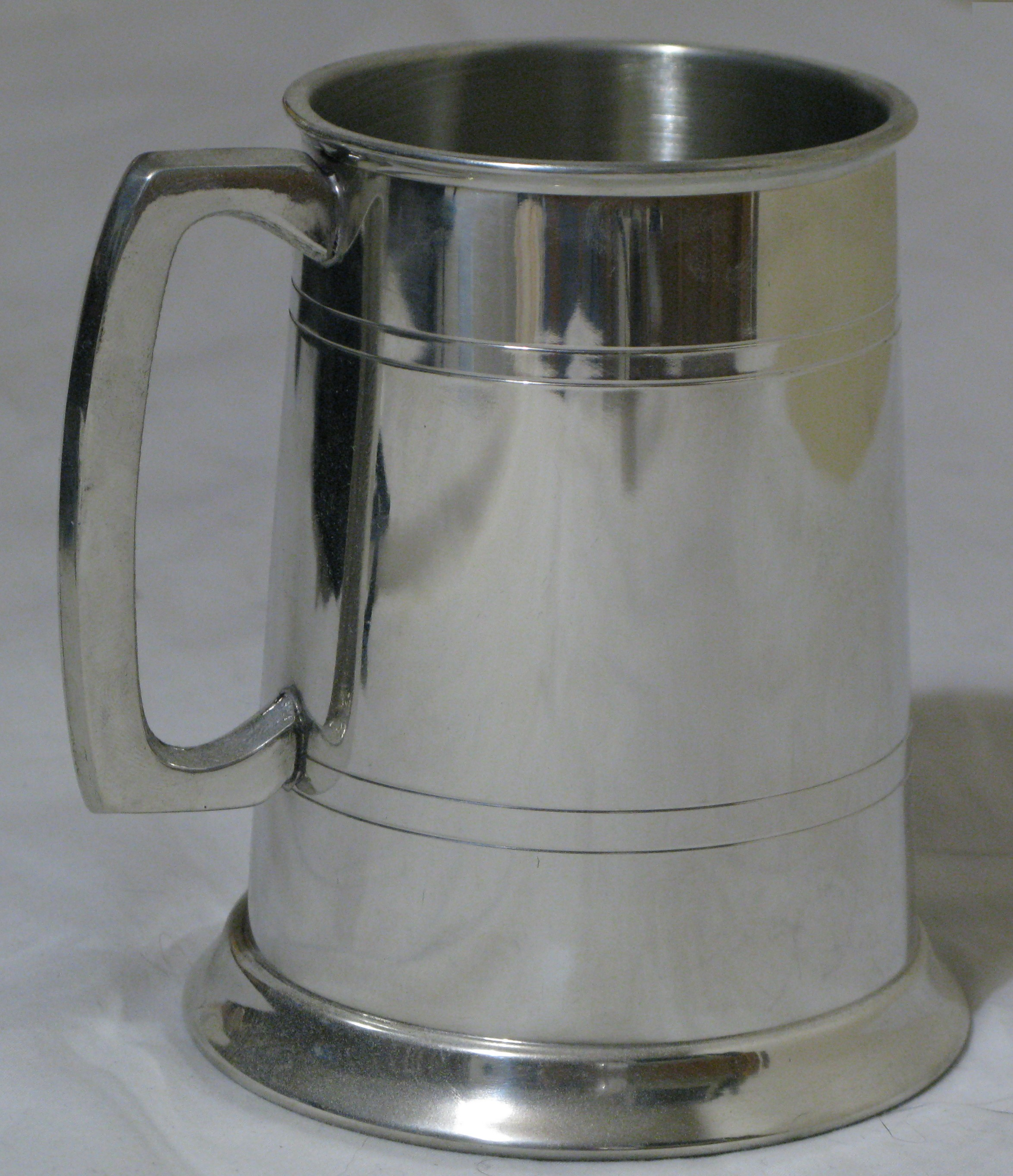
Pewter tankard

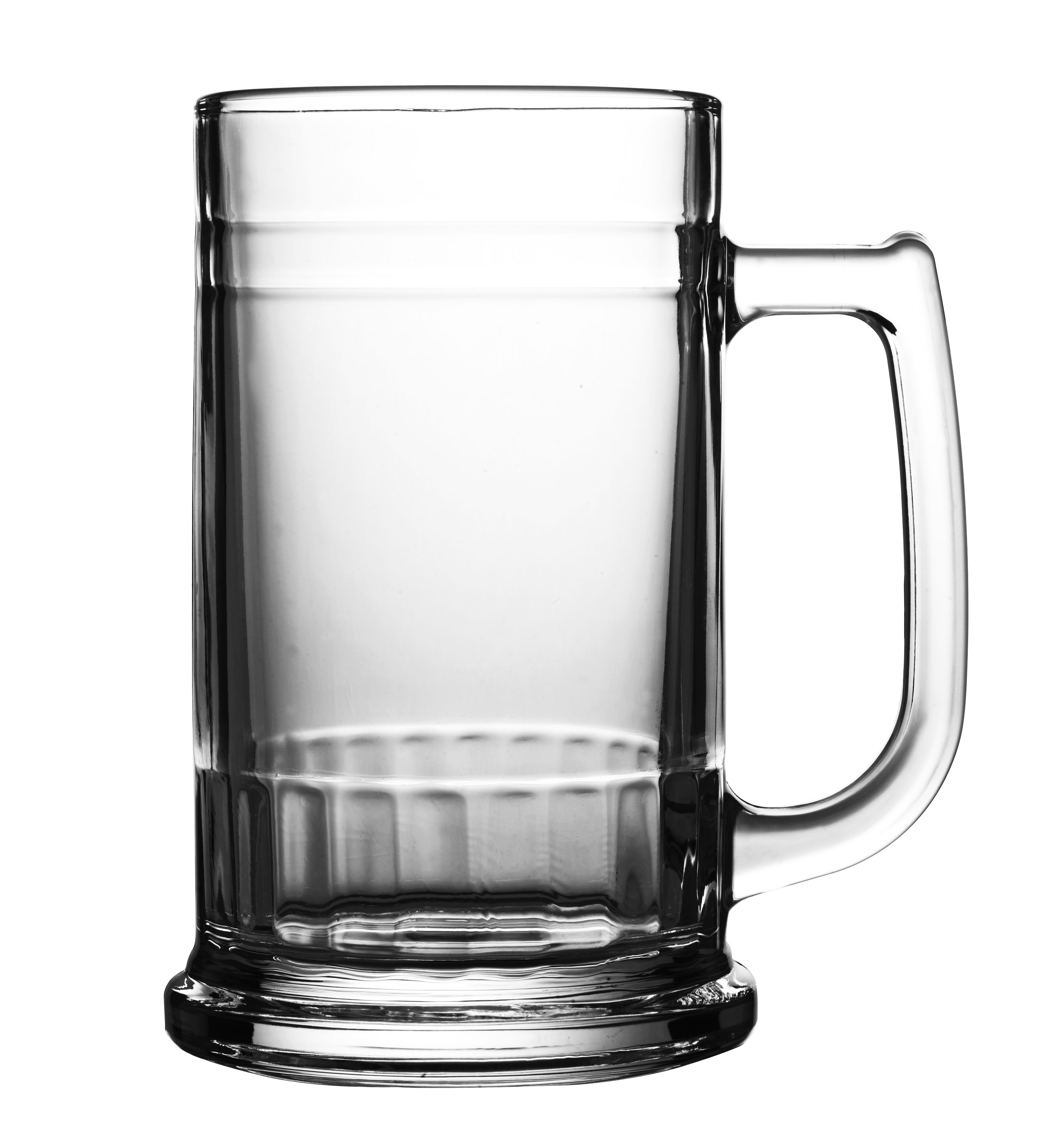
Modern glass tankard

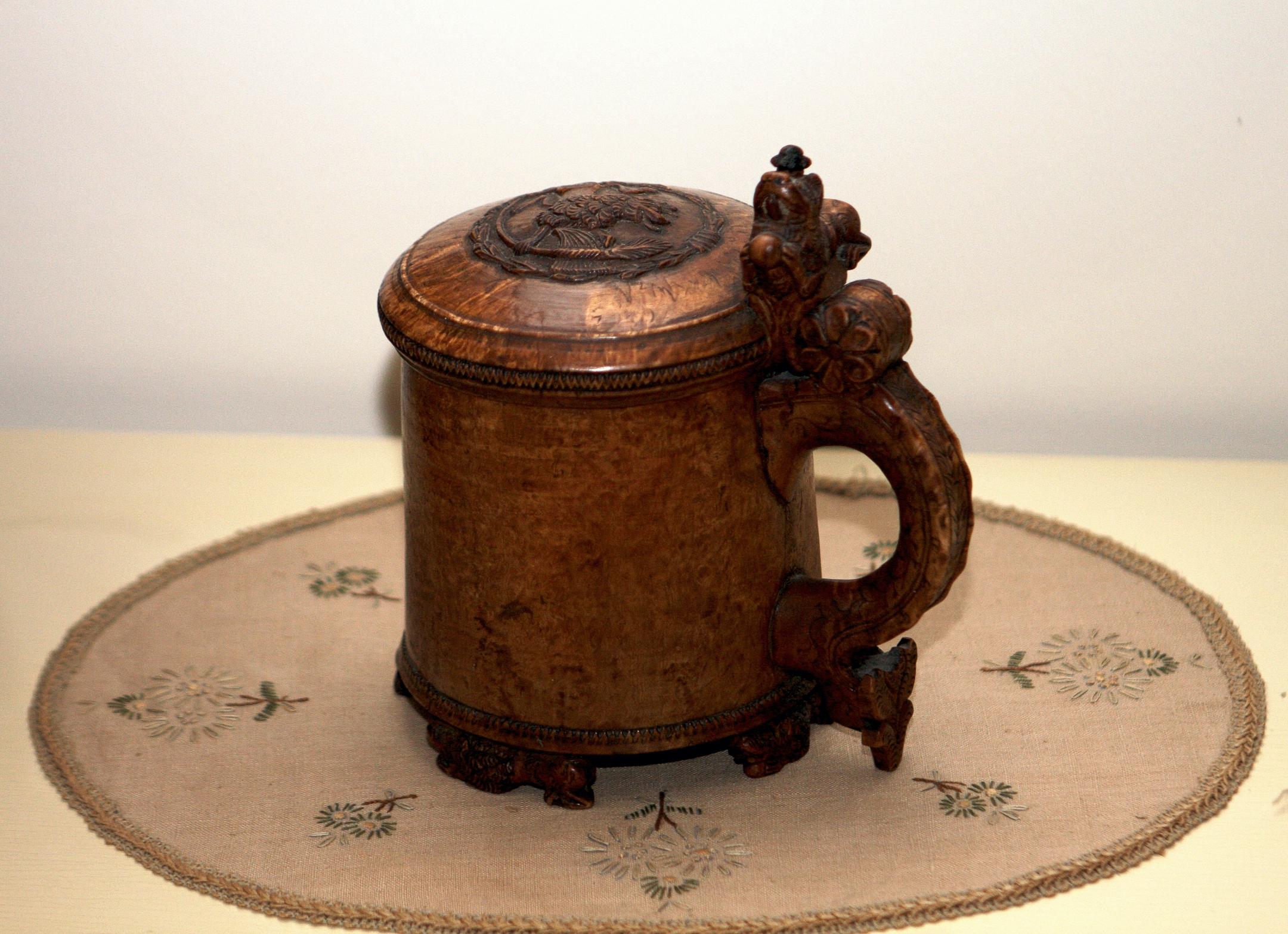
A 19th-century Norwegian burr-birch tankard

== See also ==
- Beer stein
- Häufebecher
- Kronkåsa
- Maß
