= Oh What a World =

Oh What a World may refer to:

- Oh What a World (album), a 2000 album by Paul Brady
- "Oh What a World" (song), a 2004 song by Rufus Wainwright
- "Oh, What a World", a 2018 song by Kacey Musgraves from Golden Hour
