= Prince of the Deep Water =

Studio album by The Blessing
- Released: 1991
- Studios: AIR (London, England)
- Label: MCA
- Producers: Neil Dorfsman; Mike Westergaard

The Blessing chronology
Prince of the Deep Water (1991)	Locusts and Wild Honey (1998)

Prince of the Deep Water is the debut album by British musical group The Blessing, released in 1991 by MCA Records. It includes the band's only UK top 40 hit single, "Highway 5", which initially reached No. 42 on the UK singles chart before being remixed and re-released at the end of 1991, this time peaking at No. 30 in early 1992. The album was produced by Neil Dorfsman along with band member Mike Westergaard, and features guest musicians including Nicky Hopkins, Richard Tee, Jeff Porcaro, and Bruce Hornsby. It went on to sell 125,000 copies.

== Critical reception ==
Professional ratings
Review scores
Source	Rating
AllMusic	4/5 stars

In a review for AllMusic, Tom Demalon wrote that "Prince of the Deep Water is a captivating album from the opening moments of the lead track, "Highway 5"" and that singer William Topley "possesses a deep, blues-tinged voice, capable of great warmth." He went on to opine that "The lyrics possess some sophistication, which probably didn't help the band to find a market.", and that "There's a bit too much sheen at moments, but this only marginally detracts from the overall strong material and good performances."

== Track listing ==
All tracks written by William Topley, except where noted.

No.	Title	Writer(s)	Length
1.	"Highway 5"	Topley; Luke Brighty; Kevin Hime-Knowles; Mike Westergaard	5:05
2.	"Flames"	Topley; Brighty; Hime-Knowles; John Keller	4:23
3.	"Hurricane Room"		7:10
4.	"Baby"	Topley; Brighty; Hime-Knowles	4:07
5.	"Let's Make Love"		4:11
6.	"Back from Managua"		5:12
7.	"I Want You"		7:06
8.	"Delta Rain"		6:04
9.	"Birdhouse"	Topley; Brighty; Hime-Knowles	5:02
10.	"Denial"		4:00
11.	"Prince of the Deep Water"	Topley; Brighty; Hime-Knowles; Westergaard	5:17

== Personnel ==
Adapted from the album's liner notes.

=== Musicians ===
- William Topley – vocals
- Luke Brighty – guitars
- Mike Westergaard – keyboards
- Kevin Hime-Knowles – bass guitars
- Simon Hanson – drums
- Perri (Carolyn Perry, Darlene Perry, Lori Perry, Sharon Perry), Rebecca Price, Reginald Brisbon – additional vocals

Additional musicians

Musicians thanked in the liner notes "for their help in making this record":

- Alex Acuña (drummer & percussionist)
- Jimmy Bralower (drummer)
- Alan Clark (keyboardist)
- Michael "Rham Lee" Davis (trumpeter)
- Nathan East (bass guitarist & vocalist)
- Harvey Estrin (woodwind player)
- Steve Ferrone (drummer)
- Robben Ford (guitarist)
- Mel Gaynor (drummer)
- John Giblin (bass guitarist)
- James Harrah (guitarist)
- Nicky Hopkins (pianist & organist)
- Bruce Hornsby (singer & pianist)
- Dan Hovey (guitarist)
- Bashiri Johnson (percussionist)
- Steve Khan (guitarist)
- Harry Kim (trumpeter)
- Dee Long (guitarist & keyboardist)
- Hugh McCracken (guitarist)
- Eddie Martinez (guitarist)
- Mark Morgan (pianist & keyboardist)
- Don Myrick (saxophonist)
- Jeff Porcaro (drummer)
- Louis Satterfield (bass guitarist & trombonist)
- Richard Tee (pianist)
- Soozie Tyrell (guitarist & violinist)
- Thomas Washington (Tom Tom 84/99; musician & arranger)

=== Technical ===
- Neil Dorfsman – producer (all tracks), recording (all tracks), mixing (tracks 1–4, 6–8, 11)
- Mike Westergaard – co-producer (all tracks)
- Rhoda Quan – production coordinator
- John Potoker – mixing (tracks 5, 9)
- Pat Dillett – mixing (track 10)
- Andy Strange, Peter Doell, Katherine Miller, Matthew La Monica, U.E. Nastasi – assistant engineers
- Gary O'Toole, Francis Manzella, Artie Smith – technical assistants
- Bob Ludwig – mastering
- Recorded at AIR (London, England)
- Mixed at Skyline (New York, New York), Mayfair (London, England), Skip Saylor Recording (Hollywood, California)
- Jonas C. Livingston – art direction
- Kim Yasuda – cover installation
- Lanning Stern – design
- Peter Darley Miller – photography
- Charmian Espinoza – stylist
