= Welcome Here Kind Stranger =

Album by Paul Brady

Studio album by Paul Brady
- Released: 1978
- Recorded: March and April 1978
- Studio: Lombard Sound, Dublin, Ireland
- Genre: Irish folk music
- Length: 43:03
- Label: Mulligan
- Producer: Paul Brady, Dónal Lunny

Paul Brady chronology
Andy Irvine/Paul Brady (1976)	Welcome Here Kind Stranger (1978)	Hard Station (1981)

Welcome Here Kind Stranger is a 1978 album by Paul Brady. After leaving The Johnstons, Brady toured with Planxty until they disbanded in 1975, and recorded a duo album with Andy Irvine in 1976.

== Welcome Here Kind Stranger ==
Welcome Here Kind Stranger is Brady's first solo album and his final folk recording before switching to mainstream rock. Its title is a phrase taken from one of the album's songs: "The Lakes of Pontchartrain". The album was initially released (vinyl and cassette) on Dónal Lunny's Mulligan label (LUN024) in 1978 and was voted "Folk Album of the Year" by Melody Maker magazine.

=== Release history ===
The album was never officially released on CD due to a breakdown in the relationship between Brady and the Mulligan label and remained out of print for many years, until finally re-mastered by Aidan Foley at Masterlabs and released in 2009 on Brady's own label, PeeBee Music.

== Overview ==
The songs on Welcome Here Kind Stranger are highly arranged – instruments are heard then disappear as they are replaced by others. Brady added musical accompaniment to his interpretation of "Don't Come Again", a song recorded by Hugh Shields of Eddie Butcher and his wife Gracie singing it in 1975. "I Am A Youth That's Inclined To Ramble" is Number 788 in Sam Henry's Songs of the People. The lyrics of "Jackson and Jane" are from Robin Morton's collection Folk Songs Sung in Ulster, for which Brady wrote a new melody. "The Lakes of Pontchartrain" was previously recorded by Christy Moore on Planxty's album Cold Blow and the Rainy Night, though Brady's version is quite different. He later re-recorded it in Irish as "Bruach Loch Pontchartrain" for the 2002 compilation album Eist Vol.2: Éist Arís, Songs In Their Native Language. The historical context of an Irishman in Louisiana is unclear but may be set during the Battle of New Orleans.

"The Creel" is another version of "The Keach in the Creel" (Child 281) and the tune and most of the words come from Packie Manus Byrne from Corkermore, Killybegs, County Donegal, to which Brady added verses from other versions in the Child collection as well as a few lines of his own. It is followed by "Out the Door and Over the Wall", an instrumental piece composed by Brady as an exercise in Balkan time signatures, on which he plays tin whistle and overdubs three bouzoukis; it was arranged by Lunny, who also plays bass bouzouki. Brady sings "Young Edmund in the Lowlands Low" unaccompanied, a song he learnt from Geordie Hanna from the townland of Derrytresk near Coalisland in east Tyrone. "The Boy on the Hilltop"/"Johnny Goin' to Ceilidh" is a set of reels; the first was originally recorded in the 1930s by Sligo fiddler Paddy Killoran in New York, and the second comes from Fermanagh flute player Cathal McConnell. "Paddy's Green Shamrock Shore" is a variant of Sam Henry's H192 that Brady learnt from Kevin Mitchell of Derry.

=== Track listing ===
1. "Don't Come Again" (Traditional; arranged by Paul Brady) – 3:35
2. "I Am a Youth That's Inclined to Ramble" (Traditional; arranged by Brady, Irvine and Lunny) – 6:10
3. "Jackson and Jane" (Music: Paul Brady; Words: Traditional) – 4:22
4. "The Lakes of Pontchartrain" (Traditional; arranged by Paul Brady) – 6:45
5. "The Creel" (Traditional; arranged by Paul Brady) – 5:22
6. "Out the Door and Over the Wall" (Paul Brady) – 2:45
7. "Young Edmund in the Lowlands Low" (Traditional; arranged by Paul Brady) – 5:48
8. "The Boy on the Hilltop"/"Johnny Goin' to Ceilidh" (Traditional; arranged by Paul Brady) – 2:09
9. "Paddy's Green Shamrock Shore" (Traditional; arranged by Brady and Irvine) – 6:07

=== Personnel ===
- Paul Brady – vocals, guitar, mandolin, harmonium, 12-string guitar, bouzouki & tin whistle
- Dónal Lunny – bouzouki, bass bouzouki & guitar (tracks 2 and 6)
- Andy Irvine – hurdy-gurdy, mandolin & harmonica (tracks 2, 3 and 9)
- Noel Hill – concertina (tracks 1 and 3)
- Tommy Peoples – fiddle (tracks 1, 3, 5 and 8)

== The Missing Liberty Tapes ==
The Missing Liberty Tapes
- The Missing Liberty Tapes album cover

Live album by Paul Brady
- Released: 2002
- Recorded: 21 July 1978
- Venue: Liberty Hall, Dublin
- Length: 58:38
- Label: PeeBee Music
- Producer: Paul Brady, Dónal Lunny

To launch Welcome Here Kind Stranger, Brady gave a concert on 21 July 1978 at Liberty Hall, Dublin.

With the participation of Irvine, Lunny, Liam O'Flynn, Matt Molloy, Paddy Glackin and Noel Hill, he presented the music from the album, minus "Young Edmund In The Lowlands Low" and "The Boy On The Hilltop/Johnny Goin' To Ceilidh", but adding three songs from the album Andy Irvine/Paul Brady: "The Jolly Soldier", "Mary and the Soldier", and his own version of "Arthur McBride", plus two reels: "The Crooked Road to Dublin/The Bucks of Oranmore".

At Brady's request, The Liberty Hall performance was recorded on his own domestic Akai 4000DB reel-to-reel tape machine by Brian Masterson, who had engineered Welcome Here Kind Stranger and knew the music well.

After forgetting that he had stored the tapes in a box of old vinyl albums, Brady found them in his attic in 2000, still in excellent condition. Intent on having them transferred to CD but unable to secure interest from a major label, he decided to release these recordings as a live album on his own PeeBee Music label in 2002, under the title of The Missing Liberty Tapes.

=== Track listing ===
1. "Paddy's Green Shamrock Shore" (Traditional; arranged by Brady and Irvine) – 6:49
2. "I Am a Youth That's Inclined to Ramble" (Traditional; arranged by Brady, Lunny and Irvine) – 7:44
3. "The Creel" (Traditional; arranged by Brady, Lunny, Irvine and Glackin) / "Out the Door and Over the Wall" (Paul Brady) – 7:20
4. "The Jolly Soldier"/"The Blarney Pilgrim" (Traditional; arranged by Brady, Lunny, Molloy, Irvine, Glackin and O'Flynn) – 5:43
5. "Mary and the Soldier" (Traditional; arranged by Brady, Lunny, Molloy, Irvine, Glackin and O'Flynn) – 4:06
6. "Jackson and Jane" (music: Paul Brady; words: Traditional) – 4:47
7. "Don't Come Again" (Traditional; arranged by Brady, Lunny, Molloy, Irvine, Glackin, O'Flynn and Hill) – 4:07
8. "The Lakes of Pontchartrain" (Traditional; arranged by Brady, Lunny, Molloy, Irvine and O'Flynn) – 7:01
9. "The Crooked Road to Dublin"/"The Bucks of Oranmore" (Traditional; arranged by Brady, Lunny, Molloy, Irvine, Glackin, O'Flynn and Hill) – 3:27
10. "Arthur McBride and the Sergeant" (Traditional; arranged and adapted Paul Brady) – 7:34

=== Personnel ===
- Paul Brady – vocals, guitar, mandolin, bouzouki & tin whistle
- Andy Irvine – hurdy-gurdy, bouzouki, mandolin & harmonica
- Dónal Lunny – bouzouki & guitar
- Paddy Glackin – fiddle
- Liam O'Flynn – uilleann pipes, tin whistle
- Matt Molloy – concert flute, tin whistle
- Noel Hill – concertina
