= I'll Make a Man of You =

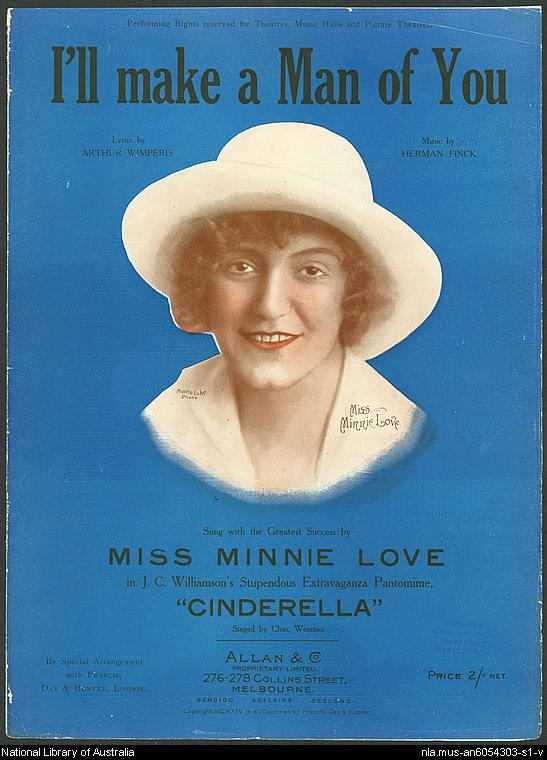

Song
- Written: 1914
- Composer(s): Arthur Wimperis
- Lyricist(s): Herman Finck

"I'll Make a Man of You" is a World War I recruiting song that was sung across Britain in hopes of rallying young men to enlist in the military. It is sung from a flirtatious young woman's perspective of how she dates military men in order to turn them into better soldiers. It was written and composed by Arthur Wimperis and Herman Finck in 1914. The song was also showcased in Frank Lloyd's Cavalcade, and in the musical and film Oh, What a Lovely War!.

This song is well known for spawning numerous obscene parody versions which were performed in music halls during World War I and World War II, and are often still sung by serving soldiers today. One of the most notable of these parodies was "I Don't Want to Join the Army", a sanitized version of which also featured in Oh, What a Lovely War!.

== Lyrics ==
The Army and the Navy need attention
The outlook isn't healthy you'll admit
But I've a perfect dream of a new recruiting scheme
Which I really think is absolutely it
If only other girls would do as I do
I believe that we could manage it alone
For I turn all suitors from me, but the Sailor and the Tommy
I've an Army and a Navy of my own.

On Sunday I walk out with a Soldier
Monday I'm taken by a Tar
Tuesday I'm out with a baby Boy Scout
On Wednesday a Hussar
On Thursday I gang out wi' a Scottie
On Friday the Captain of the crew
But on Saturday I'm willing if you'll only take the shilling
To make a man of any one of you.

I teach the tenderfoot to face the powder
That gives an added lustre to my skin
And I show the raw recruit how to give a chaste salute
So when I'm presenting arms, he's falling in
It makes you almost proud to be a woman
When you make a strapping soldier of a kid
And he says, "You put me through it and I didn't want to do it
But you went and made me love you, so I did!"

On Sunday I walk out with a Bosun
On Monday a Rifleman in green
On Tuesday I choose a Sub in the Blues
On Wednesday a Marine
On Thursday a Terrier from Tooting
On Friday a Midshipman or two
But on Saturday I'm willing if you'll only take the shilling
To make a man of any one of you!
