= Hard Station =

Studio album by Paul Brady
- Released: 1981
- Recorded: early 1981
- Studio: Windmill Lane Studios, Dublin
- Genre: Rock, adult contemporary, folk
- Label: PeeBee Music
- Producer: Paul Brady, Hugh Murphy

Paul Brady chronology
Welcome Here Kind Stranger (1978)	Hard Station (1981)	True for You (1983)

Hard Station is a 1981 album by Irish singer/songwriter Paul Brady, his second solo album.

== Track listing ==
All tracks composed by Paul Brady

1. "Crazy Dreams"
2. "The Road to the Promised Land"
3. "Busted Loose"
4. "Cold Cold Night"
5. "Hard Station"
6. "Dancer in the Fire"
7. "Night Hunting Time"
8. "Nothing But the Same Old Story"

== Personnel ==
- Paul Brady
- Jimmy Faulkner, Arty McGlynn - guitar
- Tommy Moore - bass
- Fran Breen - drums
- Betsy Cook - keyboards, vocals
