= Trick or Treat (Paul Brady album) =

Studio album by Paul Brady
- Released: 1991
- Genre: Rock, adult contemporary, folk
- Length: 0:51:28
- Label: PeeBee Music
- Producer: Gary Katz

Paul Brady chronology
Primitive Dance (1987)	Trick or Treat (1991)	Songs & Crazy Dreams (1992)

Trick or Treat is a 1991 album by Irish singer/songwriter Paul Brady, his sixth solo album, and his first for a major label. Mercury Records teamed him with producer Gary Katz, who recruited from his contacts, including Toto members Jeff Porcaro - in one of his last projects before his death - and David Paich. Notable songs include the title track - a duet with Bonnie Raitt - and "Nobody Knows", later the title of an anthology. The album entered the Irish charts at number two on 24 March 1991 and peaked at number one the following week.

== Track listing ==
All songs written by Paul Brady

1. Soul Child - 5:41
2. Blue World - 5:36
3. Nobody Knows - 4:43
4. Can't Stop Wanting You - 4:59
5. You and I - 4:35
6. Trick or Treat - 5:03
7. Don't Keep Pretending - 4:59
8. Solid Love - 4:34
9. Love Goes On - 5:05
10. Dreams Will Come - 6:06

== Personnel ==
- Paul Brady - vocals, mandolin, piano, keyboards, tin whistle, percussion, drum programming, acoustic and electric guitar
- Michael Landau - electric guitar, lead guitar, rhythm guitar
- David Paich - keyboards, piano
- Jeff Porcaro - drums, percussion
- Freddie Washington - bass
- Jimmy Johnson - bass (5)
- Elliott Randall - lead guitar (6), guitar (7, 10)
- Bonnie Raitt - lead and backing vocals (6)
- Backing Vocals – Curtis King, Fonsie Thornton, Frank Lloyd (5), Paul Brady

=== Technical ===
- Producer – Gary Katz
- Recorded by – Wayne Yurgelun
- Mastered By – Bob Ludwig
