= Spirits Colliding =

Studio album by Paul Brady
- Released: 1995
- Genres: Rock, adult contemporary, folk
- Length: 55:08
- Label: PeeBee Music
- Producers: Paul Brady; Arty McGlynn

Paul Brady chronology
Songs & Crazy Dreams (1992)	Spirits Colliding (1995)	Nobody Knows: The Best of Paul Brady (1999)

Spirits Colliding is a 1995 album by Irish singer/songwriter Paul Brady, his seventh solo album. The ITV series Faith in the Future used the track The World Is What You Make for its opening/closing titles, it also reached number 14 in the Irish Singles Chart.

== Track listing ==
1. "I Want You to Want Me" (5:59)
2. "Trust in You" (5:26)
3. "World Is What You Make It" (4:22)
4. "Marriage Made in Hollywood" (5:10)
5. "Help Me to Believe" (4:57)
6. "You're the One" (5:34)
7. "I Will Be There" (4:14)
8. "After the Party's Over" (6:17)
9. "Just in Time" (5:10)
10. "Love Made a Promise" (5:04)
11. "Beautiful World" (4:55)

== Personnel ==
- Paul Brady – vocals, guitar, acoustic guitar, electric guitar, bouzouki, mandolin, tin whistle, piano, keyboards, drums, percussion
- Mark E. Nevin – acoustic guitar, electric guitar
- Arty McGlynn – guitar
- Anthony Drennan – electric guitar
- Shea Fitzgerald – harmonica, tom-tom, background vocals
- Béla Fleck – 5-string banjo
- Victor Wooten – bass
- Roy Wooten – drums, percussion
- Jimmy Higgins – bodhran
- Ger McDonnell – cymbals
- Sharon Shannon – accordion
- Bruce Ryder, Adam Orpen-Lynch, Lenny Abrahamson, Andrea Corr, Caroline Corr, Sharon Corr, Sarah Brady – background vocals
