= The Girl Who Ate Herself =

Studio album by Betsy Cook
- Released: February 17, 1992
- Genre: Pop, synth-pop
- Length: 46:17
- Label: EastWest (Warner Music UK)
- Producer: Bruce Woolley, Stephen Lipson, Trevor Horn, Betsy Cook, Ian Stanley, Hugh Murphy, Nico Ramsden, Stuart Elliott

The Girl Who Ate Herself is the debut album by American-born singer-songwriter Betsy Cook. It was released on February 17, 1992, by EastWest Records.

== Background ==
Prior to the release of the album, Cook was a songwriter, session musician, and backing vocalist for other artists, and had worked with Paul Young, George Michael, Marc Almond, Frankie Goes to Hollywood, Seal and Gerry Rafferty. Cook had actually started recording her own material as early as 1984, when she recorded and co-produced versions of her songs "Nothing Ventured" and "Wonderland" with her then-husband Hugh Murphy (who had been Gerry Rafferty's producer). "Wonderland" was then recorded by Paul Young in 1986, with Cook on backing vocals, and became a Top 30 hit.

Cook was eventually offered a recording deal of her own through her friend Max Hole, who at the time was the managing director of East West Records in the UK. She recorded several new tracks and also re-recorded elements of the two songs that she had originally recorded with her husband in the mid-1980s. Speaking of her experience recording the album, Cook told the Manchester Evening News in 1991, "Frankly, the remotest chance that I might become famous just freaks me out. But I just had to do it. And I'm very, very glad that I've done it. To be honest it was a bit of a test for me."

Although the album (and its singles) failed to make any commercial impact, the material gained enough prominence to be covered by more established artists in later years. "Docklands" was recorded by Stevie Nicks for her 1994 album Street Angel. The track "Love Is the Groove" was recorded by Cher for her 1998 album Believe.

The album's cover portrait was taken by Cook herself, with inner portraits taken by photographer Kate Garner (former singer with the band Haysi Fantayzee). Cook explained that the album's title was inspired by "this thing artists do, emotional catastrophe, you get upset, things haven't come right, fortunately though you find the nice bit, and another, then transformation into a good lyric or poem begins".

Following the album's release, Cook did not release any further recordings of her own but continued to work with producers Horn, Lipson, and Woolley as a writer and session musician on other projects.

== Critical reception ==
Upon its release, the Fife Free Press praised The Girl Who Ate Herself as a "quality LP, both in terms of the performance and the material", which suggests Cook "has a glittering future ahead of her". The Paisley Daily Express believed that the "mature collection of songs should capture the thirty-something album market". Pan-European magazine Music & Media considered Cook to be "an interesting female singer/songwriter" who is "focused on MOR material". They continued, "It sounds like Sarah McLachlan meets Alan Parsons in his I Robot period." A reviewer for the Coventry Evening Telegraph gave the album a 7 out of 10 rating. They considered it to be "dogged by lukewarm arrangements", but added that Cook "nevertheless establishes herself as a singer-songwriter of some promise on her debut". Nick Churchill of the Poole & Dorset Advertiser stated that Cook's "style cuts through the Space Cadet doodling and introspection that is so unappealing in many of her contmeporaries".

== Track listing ==
All tracks are written by Betsy Cook except where noted.

No.	Title	Writer(s)	Length
1.	"Love Is the Groove"	Cook, Bruce Woolley	5:20
2.	"How Can I Believe?"	Cook, Clyde Lieberman	4:00
3.	"Docklands"	Cook, Trevor Horn	4:37
4.	"Exchange Some Energy"		4:02
5.	"Look to Yourself"	Cook, Woolley	4:24
6.	"Wonderland"		5:18
7.	"Hold Me Tight"		4:02
8.	"Nothing Ventured"		3:53
9.	"Diving"	Cook, Jonathan Nash	5:36
10.	"Hand On My Shoulder"		4:01
11.	"Love Is the Groove" (reprise)		0:58

== Singles ==
- "Love Is the Groove" (1992)
- "How Can I Believe?" (1992)
- "Docklands" (1992)

== Personnel ==
All tracks arranged and performed by Betsy Cook, with:

- Stephen Lipson - guitars (tracks 1,2,8), drums (1,2)
- Bruce Woolley - drums (1), harmonics (1), backing vocals (1), guitar (5)
- Luís Jardim - percussion (2)
- Tony Phillips - drums (1)
- Wil Malone - string arrange ments (2), piano and idiosyncrasies (4), "interesting noises" (1)
- Gavin Wright - strings leader (2)
- Dave DeFries - trumpet (4)
- Felix Krish - bass (5)
- Andy Duncan - drums (5)
- Richard Brunton - guitar (6)
- Stuart Elliott - drums (6,8)
- Nico Ramsden - guitar (7)
- Mark Smith - percussion (7)
- Jonathan Nash - piano (9)
- Ian Stanley - drums and "vibey vibes" (10)

Mixed by Stephen Lipson (2,4), Tony Phillips (1,3), Ren Swan (1), Paul Gomershall (5,6,7), Ross Cullum (10)
