= The Lakes of Pontchartrain =

American ballad

"The Lakes of Pontchartrain" (Roud 1836) is a folk ballad from the United States about a man who is given shelter by a Louisiana Creole woman. He falls in love with her and asks her to marry him, but she is already promised to a sailor and declines. It is a tale of unrequited love.

== Setting ==
The song is named for and set on the shores of the major estuarine waterbodies of the Pontchartrain Basin, including lakes Maurepas, Pontchartrain, and Borgne. Lake Pontchartrain forms the northern boundary of New Orleans, while Lake Maurepas is west of Lake Pontchartrain and connected to Lake Pontchartrain by Pass Manchac and North Pass. Lake Borgne is east of Lake Pontchartrain and connects to Lake Pontchartrain through the GIWW/IHNC, Pass Rigolets, and Chef Menteur Pass. Lake Borgne extends into Mississippi Sound and therefore is directly connected to the Gulf of Mexico.

== Origins ==
The exact origin of the song is unknown, though it is commonly held to have originated in the southern United States in the 19th century. Ruth Smith explored the journey of the song in an RTÉ radio documentary in 2020. The documentary traces the history of the modern Irish version and, using the Roud Folk Song Index, identifies a related version recorded in Gardner and Chickering's Ballads and Songs of Southern Michigan (1939).

The liner notes accompanying Planxty's version state that the tune was probably brought back by soldiers fighting for the British or French armies in Louisiana and Canada in the War of 1812. Although the tune might date to that period, the popular lyrics undoubtedly came much later, since they tell of taking a railway train from New Orleans to Jackson Town. This is often identified as Jackson, Mississippi, although the identity of "Jackson Town" has also been disputed, with Jackson, Tennessee proposed in some sources. The New Orleans, Jackson and Great Northern Railroad, completed between New Orleans and Jackson in 1858, was a separate line from the earlier local railways serving Lake Pontchartrain. Most likely, the lyrics date to the Civil War, and the reference to "foreign money" being "no good" may reflect the widespread circulation of different banknotes, including Confederate, Union, state and locally issued currencies during the Civil War era, depending upon who was in control of the area at the time. It should also be noted that thousands of banks, during the civil war, issued their own bank notes, which could be rejected in various towns, depending on how trusted were the issuing bank. Also, the Confederacy and Union issued their own bank notes—as did individual States—leading to a proliferation of currency (notes and coinage) that might not be acceptable in a particular region.

== Versions ==
=== Planxty and Paul Brady ===
The best-known versions of the song use the tune for "Lily of the West", especially the recordings by the Irish traditional musical group Planxty on Cold Blow and the Rainy Night in 1974 where they give Mike Waterson as their source, and by the Irish musician and songwriter (and sometime member of Planxty) Paul Brady on Welcome Here Kind Stranger in 1978. The 2002 release of a live recording of the songs from the aforementioned album, entitled The Missing Liberty Tapes, preserves a solo rendition of "The Lakes of Pontchartrain" from Brady's 1978 concert at Liberty Hall in Dublin. A new recording of "The Lakes of Pontchartrain" appears on his 1999 album Nobody Knows: The Best of Paul Brady. Brady has also recorded an Irish-language version of the song, as "Bruach Loch Pontchartrain", translated by Francie Mooney. Planxty member Christy Moore later recorded the song for his 1983 solo album The Time Has Come.

=== Other notable performers ===
- Trapezoid, on the 1980 release, Now and Then
- Harvey Reid, on his 1988 album Of Wind and Water
- Bob Dylan performed the song frequently in 1988–1989 and on 23 November 2025 in Killarney, Ireland
- The Hothouse Flowers, in 1990, featured on the Bringing it all Back Home Irish/American music compilation
- Peter Case, on his 1993 album Sings Like Hell
- Andy M. Stewart, former lead singer for Silly Wizard, covered this version on his 1994 album Man In The Moon
- The song was included on Swedish rock artist Svante Karlsson's debut album American Songs in 1999
- Jane Siberry's 2000 album, Hush
- The Be Good Tanyas, on their debut album, Blue Horse (2001)
- Merrie Amsterburg, on her Clementine and Other Stories album in 2006
- Tangerine Dream, for the 2007 album Madcap's Flaming Duty
- The song has also been recorded in 2010 by Irish band The Coronas
- It was sung by Irish Taoiseach (prime minister) Brian Cowen in the Ardilaun Hotel, Galway during an infamous late-night drinking session in September 2010
- Aoife O'Donovan performed a version for a live audience during the November 16, 2013, broadcast of A Prairie Home Companion from the Music Hall at Fair Park in Dallas, Texas. O'Donovan recorded the song again in March 2020 for Live from Here during its "Live from Home" series during the COVID-19 pandemic
- Warren Zevon performed the song live at the Neil Young Bridge Benefit in Mountain View, CA on 11/06/1993
- Celtic Woman recorded the song in 2021 on their album Postcards from Ireland
- Oli Steadman included it on his song collection "365 Days Of Folk".
- Father, Son, and Friends recorded the song on their album Rebels, Rogues, and Rascals in the early 1990s.

== Alternative lyrics and tunes ==
An alternative verse can be found in the Digital Tradition Folk Song Search. The tune, or a slight variation of it, is to be found in the Scots tradition accompanying the Border ballad Jock O'Hazeldean.

When this song made its way west, cowboys changed the title to "On the Lake of the Poncho Plains." The Creole girl became a Cree Indian and the Pontchartrain was changed to the Poncho Plains. The cowboy version is recorded in Singing Cowboy; A Book of Western Songs collected and edited by Margaret Larkin, c1931.
