= Say What You Feel =

Studio album by Paul Brady
- Released: 2005
- Genre: Rock, folk
- Label: PeeBee Music

Paul Brady chronology
Oh What a World (2000)	Say What You Feel (2005)

Say What You Feel is a 2005 album by Irish singer/songwriter Paul Brady, his ninth solo album.

== Track listing ==
1. "Smile"
2. "Don't Try to Please Me"
3. "Love in a Bubble"
4. "I Only Want You"
5. "Living For the Corporation"
6. "Say What You Feel"
7. "Locked Up in Heaven"
8. "Sail Sail On"
9. "You That's Really You"
10. "Doin't It in the Dark"
11. "Beyond the Reach of Love"
12. "The Man I Used to Be"

== Personnel ==
- Paul Brady - vocals, acoustic guitar, bass, keyboards, Fender Rhodes, percussion, backing vocals
- Tom Britt - electric guitar
- Danny Thompson, Viktor Krauss, Byron House - string bass
- Garry West - electric bass
- Reese Wynans - Hammond organ
- John R. Burr - piano, Wurlitzer
- Kenny Malone - drums, percussion
- Alison Brown - electric banjo
- Gerry O'Beirne - ukulele
- Steve Conn - accordion
- Jim Hoke - saxophone
- Neil Rosengarden - trumpet
- Scat Springs, Andrea Zonn - backing vocals
