= Ewan McLennan =

Scottish musician

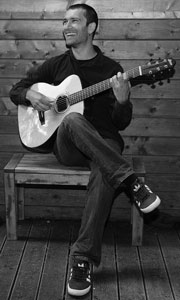
- Ewan McLennan, 2014

Background information
- Born: 31 July 1986 (age 39); London
- Genres: Folk, roots
- Occupations: Musician, Singer-Songwriter, Guitarist
- Instruments: Guitar, Piano
- Years active: 2010 – present
- Label: Fellside Records
- Website: ewanmclennan.co.uk

Ewan McLennan is a Scottish folk musician and singer-songwriter. Although born in London, McLennan grew up in Edinburgh, and studied classical music on the piano. Later, he took up the guitar and as he had developed a strong interest in folk music, he started playing folk and acoustic music clubs in 2010. That year he was signed to Fellside Records and recorded his first album 'Rags & Robes', which cemented his reputation on the UK folk circuit, and led to him winning the 2011 Horizon Award at the BBC Radio 2 Folk Awards.

His second album, 'The Last Bird To Sing', was released in 2012, and led to further awards... two Spiral Earth Awards and the Alistair Hulett Memorial Prize for Political Songwriting.

Mike Harding, then of BBC Radio 2, said "I was completely and utterly bowled over by Ewan's music. One of the most exciting new voices I've heard in years. Deep commitment and understanding is the bedrock, and there's a sure touch here that runs through the music like iron. He sings beautifully, with great sincerity, great empathy, he's terrific!", and indeed went on to interview McLennan on his weekly folk show.

McLennan was invited to be part of BBC's Transatlantic Sessions in 2013, which saw him performing and recording alongside internationally renowned musicians from both sides of the Atlantic.

In September 2014 McLennan's 3rd album "Stories Still Untold" was released. Songlines Magazine said, "Ewan McLennan continues his evolution into a major figure on the Scottish folk scene". Bright Young Folk commented, "Ewan delivers both traditional and original songs with real passion and honesty" and included a lengthy interview with McLennan in September. In November, SongLines Magazine said "Ewan McLennan continues his evolution into a major figure on the Scottish folk scene".

In October 2016 McLennan collaborated with author and journalist George Monbiot to produce the album "Breaking The Spell Of Loneliness" which seeks to address the curse of our age: a crowded planet stricken by loneliness. The Guardian called it "A powerful, poignant set", while Folk Radio described it as "an enthralling album".

== Discography ==
=== Rags & Robes ===
Rags & Robes
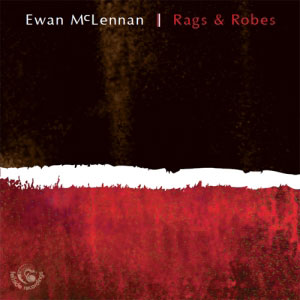

Studio album by Ewan McLennan
- Released: 2010
- Label: Fellside Records

1. "Tramps & Hawkers"
2. "Jamie Foyers"
3. "Arthur Mcbride"
4. "Old Man's Song"
5. "Jock Stewart"
6. "Another Morning's Beggar"
7. "Joe Hill"
8. "Jer The Rigger Flowers Of Edinburgh"
9. "As I Roved Out"
10. "A Man's A Man For A' That"
11. "Jute Mill Song"
12. "I'm A Rover"
13. "Yorkshire Regiment"
14. "Auld Lang Syne"

=== The Last Bird To Sing ===
The Last Bird To Sing
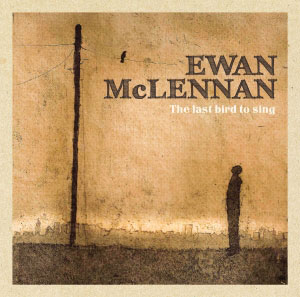

Studio album by Ewan McLennan
- Released: 2012
- Label: Fellside Records

1. "Rolling Hills Of The Borders"
2. "Whistling The Esperanza"
3. "Jamie Raeburn"
4. "Banks Of Marble"
5. "The Last Bird To Sing"
6. "Reeling & Staggering / Napolean Crossing The Alps"
7. "Lichtbob's Lassie"
8. "Joe Glenton"
9. "Butcher's Boy"
10. "Killyclare"
11. "The Lass Of Aughrim / Ae Fond Kiss"

=== Stories Still Untold ===
Stories Still Untold
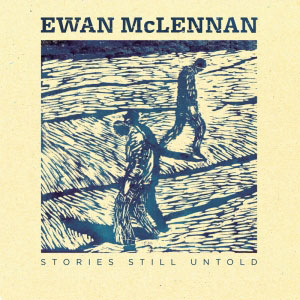

Studio album by Ewan McLennan
- Released: 2014
- Genre: Folk
- Label: Fellside Records

1. "A Beggar"
2. "Out On The Banks"
3. "The Shearing"
4. "Aye Waulkin' O"
5. "Song Of The Lower Classes"
6. "Tales From Down At The Harp"
7. "The Ballad Of Amy Neilson"
8. "Rattlin' Roarin' Willie"
9. "The False Young Man"
10. "Prince Robert"
11. "The Granite Cage"
12. "Henry Joy"
13. "Coorie Doon"

=== Breaking The Spell Of Loneliness ===
Breaking The Spell Of Loneliness

Studio album by Ewan McLennan & George Monbiot
- Released: 2016
- Label: Fellside Records

1. "Such A Thing As Society"
2. "The Child Inside"
3. "My Time And Yours"
4. "Reclaim The Street"
5. "These Four Walls"
6. "Unknown Lament"
7. "The Night Desk"
8. "I'm Coming Home"
9. "We Shall Overcome"
