= Primitive Dance =

Studio album by Paul Brady
- Released: 1987
- Genre: Rock, adult contemporary, folk
- Length: 44:10
- Label: PeeBee Music, Mercury
- Producer: Ian Maidman

Paul Brady chronology
Full Moon (1986)	Primitive Dance (1987)	Trick or Treat (1991)

Primitive Dance is a 1987 album by Irish singer/songwriter Paul Brady, his fifth solo album. The song "The Awakening" features the vocals of Irish singer Moya Brennan. Mark Knopfler guests on guitar on "The Game Of Love".

== Track listing ==
1. Steal Your Heart Away - 5:45
2. The Soul Commotion - 3:39
3. Paradise Is Here - 5:00
4. It's Gonna Work Out Fine - 3:53
5. The Awakening - 5:58
6. Eat The Peach - 5:33
7. Don't Start Knocking - 5:06
8. Just In Case Of Accidents - 5:12
9. The Game Of Love - 4:04
