= Docklands (song) =

1992 single by Betsy Cook

Single by Betsy Cook

from the album The Girl Who Ate Herself
- B-side: "Nothing Ventured"
- Released: 18 May 1992
- Genre: Pop
- Length: 4:37
- Label: East West
- Songwriters: Betsy Cook; Trevor Horn
- Producer: Trevor Horn

Betsy Cook singles chronology
"How Can I Believe?" (1992)	"Docklands" (1992)

"Docklands" is a song written by American-born singer-songwriter Betsy Cook and English record producer and musician Trevor Horn. It was originally recorded by the English six-piece all-female a cappella/pop group the Mint Juleps for their 1988 studio album, The Power of Six. Cook recorded her own version for her debut studio album, The Girl Who Ate Herself, in 1992.

== Background ==
"Docklands" was originally recorded in 1987 by the Mint Juleps during the sessions for their second studio album, The Power of Six, which was produced by Trevor Horn. Cook co-wrote four of the songs on the album and contributed keyboards, programming and vocal arrangements. She had the initial idea for "Docklands" and it was subsequently written with Horn for the Mint Juleps to record.

The song was initially inspired by London and the Mint Julep's experiences of growing up and living there, particular of the four members who were sisters. Cook then turned to her own experiences growing up in America to complete the lyrics. In 1992, she revealed:

[The sisters] told Trevor about how they had to go with their mother to the launderette because she got mugged one day and somebody stole all their laundry. So, we took that as a starting point for the first verse and then as the song developed, I realised that if I didn't bring any inside experience, it wasn't going to work as a song. So, I imagined what it was like for me being a sort of intelligent person in a very small redneck and closed-minded town, where nobody really understood what was going on in my head at all. I hated the politics of most of the people in my town and felt very lonely, and couldn't think of anything but than how soon I could get out of there. That's all I thought about, 'I've got to get out of this town as soon as I can'. So, 'Docklands' sort of turned into my song in the end.

The Mint Juleps's version was distributed by Stiff Records on white label in 1987 and was included on their 1988 album The Power of Six. In 2013, it was released as a 7-inch single as part of the various artists box-set Ten Big Stiffs for that year's Record Store Day.

After signing to East West Records as a solo artist, Cook recorded "Docklands" for her debut studio album, The Girl Who Ate Herself, with Horn as the producer. The final recording was virtually the same track that Cook and Horn had originally demoed together, but with a few additions made and the drums altered. The liner notes for the album noted that the track had "musical contributions by a cast of dozens, laid on the original foundations". It was released as the album's third and final single on 18 May 1992 and reached number 142 on the UK Singles Chart.

== Critical reception ==
Upon its release as a single, Alan Jones of Music Week noted that Cook's version of "Docklands" "provides a crisp, upbeat framework for her clear and fresh vocals". He described her as a "rather serious and sober songwriter" and added that, like Tori Amos, "there's no reason why she shouldn't also become a familiar name in both countries [the UK and US]". Peter Kinghorn of the Evening Chronicle called it a "wistful ballad that lilts along nicely".

== Track listings ==
7–inch single (UK)

1. "Docklands" – 4:37
2. "Nothing Ventured" – 3:54

CD single (UK)

1. "Docklands" – 4:37
2. "Nothing Ventured" – 3:54
3. "Hand On My Shoulder" – 4:02

== Personnel ==
Production

- Trevor Horn – production ("Docklands")
- Tony Phillips – mixing ("Docklands")
- Stephen Fitzmaurice – mixing assistance ("Docklands")
- Betsy Cook – production ("Nothing Ventured", "Hand On My Shoulder")
- Hugh Murphy – production ("Nothing Ventured")
- Ian Stanley – production ("Hand On My Shoulder")

Other

- Kate Garner – photography
- Alison Tutton – design

== Charts ==
Chart (1992)	Peak position
UK Singles Chart (OCC)	142
