= Arthur McBride =

Folk song found in Ireland, Scotland and England with slight variations

"Arthur McBride" (also called "The Recruiting Sergeant" or "Arthur McBride and the Sergeant") is a folk song (Roud 2355) probably of Irish origin, also found in England, Scotland, Australia, and North America. Describing a violent altercation with a recruiting sergeant, it can be narrowly categorized as an "anti-recruiting" song, a specific form of anti-war song, and more broadly as a protest song. A. L. Lloyd described it as "that most good-natured, mettlesome, and un-pacifistic of anti-militarist songs".

== Content ==
The song's narrator recounts how he and his cousin or friend, Arthur McBride, were strolling by the sea when approached by three soldiers: a recruiting sergeant, a corporal and a young drummer. The sergeant tries to entice the pair to volunteer with a recruitment bounty and smart uniform, but they refuse the prospect of being sent to fight and die in France. The sergeant takes offence at the uncivil tone and threatens to use his sword, but before he can draw it the pair beat the soldiers with shillelaghs, and throw their swords and drum in the sea. Some singers omit the song's more violent details. Sometimes the name is "Arthur le Bride". The sergeant is usually named "Napper" or "Napier", the corporal "Vamp" or "Cramp". Many versions are set on Christmas morning. A Scottish version is on a "summer's morning", and Arthur McBride is the name of the recruiting sergeant rather than the narrator's ally.

== History ==
The reference to France is often taken to set the song during the Napoleonic Wars, but may mean some earlier Anglo-French war.

Broadside ballads with the lyrics include one printed c. 1815–1822 in Glasgow, and another with different metre headed "Arthur Macbride. A new song". A song in Newcastle upon Tyne marking the 1821 coronation of George IV specifies its tune as "Arthur McBride". "The Bold Tenant Farmer" has a similar tune which is sometimes used.

Thomas Ainge Devyr (1805–1887), an Irish Chartist who emigrated to America in 1840, in his 1882 memoir recalled the song from his youth in County Donegal. In 1892 Frederick William Bussell collected "Arthur le Bride" from a mason named Sam Fone, who learned it from his father in Dartmoor in the 1830s. A melody called "Art Mac Bride" collected in Donegal by George Petrie (1790–1866) was published in 1902 by Charles Villiers Stanford. Patrick Weston Joyce (1827–1914) published words and a different air in 1909. He said he had learned it in his County Limerick boyhood "from hearing the people all round me sing it", but suspected it originated in Donegal. The Greig-Duncan Folk Song Collection has four versions gathered in northeast Scotland between 1902 and 1914.

Ethnomusicological recordings include a field recording of a farmworker named Alex Campbell from Aberdeenshire singing a snatch of "Erther Mac Bride" (beginning "You Needna Be Bragging About Your Braw Claes") collected by James Madison Carpenter between 1929 and 1935, and one made by A. L. Lloyd for the BBC in Walberswick, Suffolk in 1939. Gould Academy c. 1955 published A Heritage of Songs by Carrie Grover (née Spinney, 1879–1959) from Nova Scotia, including a version of "Arthur McBride" she had learned from her father. Campbell and Grover's recordings are available on the internet.

== Commercial recordings ==
"Arthur McBride" was recorded during the British folk revival by The Exiles (Enoch Kent, Bobby Campbell, and Gordon McCulloch) on their 1966 album Freedom, Come All Ye; and by Martin Carthy and Dave Swarbrick on their 1969 album Prince Heathen. Planxty recorded Joyce's version on their 1973 self-titled debut album. Later recordings include Paddy Reilly (The Town I Loved So Well, 1975); John Kirkpatrick and Sue Harris (Stolen Ground, 1989); Chris Foster (Traces, 1999); Ewan McLennan (Rags & Robes, 2010).

Paul Brady adapted a long version from Grover's A Heritage of Songs, which he had found while touring America with the Johnstons in 1972–1973. When Brady joined Planxty they switched to playing his version, and he recorded it as "Arthur McBride and the Sergeant" on the 1976 album Andy Irvine/Paul Brady. (Andy Irvine did not feature on the track.) Brady's acoustic guitar has open G tuning and he combines Irish traditional style with some ornaments, "interplay[ing] between solo melodic moments and brief chordal sections"; it is widely considered the song's definitive version. John Leventhal included it on a mixtape for Rosanne Cash, which she said persuaded her to marry him. Many later versions derive from Brady's, including those of Bob Dylan (Good as I Been to You, 1992), Mipso (a 2020 Christmas single), and Australian Paul Kelly (Paul Kelly's Christmas Train, 2021). The 1978 short film Christmas Morning is a music video enactment of Brady's recording, starring Paul Bennett as Arthur McBride and Godfrey Quigley as the recruiting sergeant.

== See also ==
- The Recruiting Serjeant

== Sources ==
- Winick, Stephen (2 December 2015). "Paul Brady, Carrie Grover, Bob Dylan, and "Arthur McBride"". Folklife Today. Library of Congress.
- Winick, Stephen (24 December 2015). "Arthur McBride, Carrie Grover, Paul Brady, and Rosanne Cash: More About a Classic Song". Folklife Today. Library of Congress.
