= True for You =

Studio album by Paul Brady
- Released: 1983
- Studio: Air Studios (London)
- Genre: Pop rock; adult contemporary; folk
- Length: 42:38
- Label: PeeBee Music
- Producer: Neil Dorfsman; Paul Brady

Paul Brady chronology
Hard Station (1981)	True for You (1983)	Back to the Centre (1986)

Professional ratings
Review scores
Source	Rating
AllMusic	3/5 stars

True for You is the third studio album by the Irish singer-songwriter Paul Brady, released in 1983 by Polydor Records. Neil Dorfsman and Brady produced the album

In 1999, a digitally remastered CD of the album was released by Rykodisc.

== Critical reception ==
In a retrospective review for AllMusic, critic Rick Anderson wrote that "the songs have aged surprisingly well for an album of this vintage." Adding that "while the drum sound and synth parts scream 1980s, Brady's songcraft is pretty well timeless."

== Track listing ==
All tracks are written by Paul Brady.

Side one
No.	Title	Length
1.	"The Great Pretender"	4:58
2.	"Let It Happen"	4:32
3.	"Helpless Heart"	4:27
4.	"Dance the Romance"	5:05

Side two
No.	Title	Length
5.	"Steel Claw"	4:03
6.	"Take Me Away"	5:44
7.	"Not the Only One"	6:06
8.	"Interlude"	2:28
9.	"Trouble Round the Bend"	5:15
Total length:		42:38

== Personnel ==
Credits are adapted from the True for You liner notes.

Musicians

- Paul Brady – lead and background vocals; acoustic and electric guitars; synthesizer; piano; mandolin
- Phil Palmer – acoustic, electric, twelve-string and slide guitars
- Betsy Cook – synthesizer; piano; Hammond organ
- Jamie Lane – drums; percussion
- Dave Quinn – bass guitar
- John McKenzie – bass guitar
- Mickey Feat – bass guitar
- Mel Collins – saxophone
- John Earle – baritone saxophone
- Ray Beavis – tenor saxophone
- Chris Gower – trombone
- Dick Hanson – trumpet
- Peter Veitch – synthesizer
- Neil Dorfsman – percussion
- Julian Diggle – percussion
- Richard Piper – backing vocals
- Sharon Campbell – backing vocals

Production

- Neil Dorfsman – producer; engineer; mixing
- Paul Brady – producer
- Steve Lipson – mixing on "The Great Pretender"
