= Songs & Crazy Dreams =

Compilation album by Paul Brady
- Released: 1992
- Genre: Folk rock, pop
- Label: PeeBee Music
- Producer: Various

Paul Brady chronology
Trick or Treat (1991)	Songs & Crazy Dreams (1992)	Spirits Colliding (1995)

Songs & Crazy Dreams is a 1992 compilation album by Irish singer/songwriter Paul Brady. Released in 1992, it features re-mixed versions of songs from the previous decade.

== Track listing ==
1. Crazy Dreams
2. Paradise Is Here
3. Dancer In The Fire
4. Nothing But The Same Old Story
5. Deep In Your Heart
6. The Homes Of Donegal
7. Walk The White Line
8. The Road To The Promised Land
9. The Island
10. Steal Your Heart Away
11. Follow On
12. Helpless Heart
