= Love Is the Groove =

1992 single by Betsy Cook

Single by Betsy Cook

from the album The Girl Who Ate Herself
- B-side: "Diving"
- Released: January 6, 1992 (UK)
- Recorded: 1991
- Genre: Electronic, pop
- Length: 4:40
- Label: East West
- Songwriters: Betsy Cook; Bruce Woolley
- Producers: Bruce Woolley; Betsy Cook

Betsy Cook singles chronology
"Love Is the Groove" (1992)	"How Can I Believe?" (1992)

"Love Is the Groove" is the debut single by the American-born singer-songwriter Betsy Cook, released on January 6, 1992, by East West Records from her debut studio album, The Girl Who Ate Herself (1992). The song was written and produced by Cook and Bruce Woolley. It peaked at number 88 in the UK Singles Chart.

The song was covered by American singer-actress Cher for her Grammy-winning 1998 album Believe. Cher's version featured similar, yet more updated techno-sounding instrumentation and slightly altered lyrics.

== Background ==
In 1992, Cook revealed that "Love Is the Groove" "came from feeling terribly happy", whereas many other songs on The Girl Who Ate Herself came from "feeling rather sad" or were inspired by "being at some really big changing point [in life]". She added, "It's all about you come to a certain place and you pulsate at the same frequency, and you feel at home."

== Critical reception ==
Upon its release, The Arbroath Herald awarded "Love Is the Groove" an eight out of ten rating and wrote, "There's rather a nice melody to this track, which has an almost Christmassy sound about it, and it certainly is a grower – given the right exposure it could easily make the top ten. If it has a fault, it is that it falls into the 'currently popular female vocalist who could just about be anybody' category." The Chorley Guardian rated it nine out of ten and called it a "beautifully atmospheric track that makes its dance backing at first surprising". The reviewer continued, "The love lyrics would sit comfortably on any Enya album, but the quality of the production is enough to convince us that the two can be put together very successfully." Bill Graham, writing for Hot Press, opined that the song had 1980s production values. Sally Margaret Joy of Melody Maker was negative in her review, writing, "Betsy's singing is in tune to no tune at all. The tune got lost in all the fussiness that surrounds it."

== Track listings ==
7–inch single (UK and Europe) and cassette single (UK)

1. "Love Is the Groove" – 4:40
2. "Diving" – 5:36

12–inch single (UK and Europe)

1. "Love Is the Groove" (Heavens to Betsy mix) – 7:17
2. "Love Is the Groove" (Funky Phantom mix) – 6:41
3. "Love Is the Groove" (7" mix) – 4:40
4. "Love Is the Groove" (Cookie Monster mix) – 6:33

CD single (UK and Europe)

1. "Love Is the Groove" – 4:40
2. "Love Is the Groove" (Heavens to Betsy mix) – 7:17
3. "Love Is the Groove" (Funky Phantom mix) – 6:41
4. "Diving" – 5:36

== Personnel ==
"Love Is the Groove"

- Betsy Cook – vocals
- Bruce Woolley – general musical input, drums, harmonics, backing vocals
- Stephen Lipson – loopy guitar, extra drums
- Wil Malone – interesting noises
- Tony Phillips – extra drums

Production

- Bruce Woolley – production and engineering ("Love Is the Groove")
- Betsy Cook – production ("Love Is the Groove", "Diving")
- Tony Phillips – mixing ("Love Is the Groove")
- Steve Fitzmaurice – mixing assistance ("Love Is the Groove")
- Ren Swan – additional mixing ("Love Is the Groove"), mixing (all remixes of "Love Is the Groove")
- Justin Vikkerman – additional mixing assistance ("Love Is the Groove")
- Jon Marsh – special remix production (all remixes of "Love Is the Groove")

Other

- Kate Garner – front photography
- Stylorouge – design

== Charts ==
Chart (1992)	Peak position
UK Singles Chart (OCC)	88
UK Top 50 Airplay Chart (Music Week)	48
