= Carrie B. Grover =

Canadian folk singer, fiddler, and folk song collector

- Born: Carrie Blanche Spinney; 1879; Nova Scotia, Canada
- Died: 1959 (aged 79–80); Gorham, Maine
- Burial place: Eastern Cemetery, Maine
- Education: Gould Academy
- Occupations: Folk singer, fiddler, folk song collector
- Spouse: Almon Roy Grover

Carrie Blanche Grover (née Spinney; 1879–1959) was a Canadian folk singer, fiddler, and folk song collector. She was a recognized authority on folk music, whose songs were recorded for the Library of Congress by both Alan Lomax and Sidney Robertson Cowell.

== Early life ==
Carrie Spinney was born in Nova Scotia in 1879, where she lived until the age of 12. She was the daughter of George Craft Spinney and Eliza Long. The family moved to Maine and she attended Gould Academy. Fred Lincoln Hill described Grover as coming:

from a family of farmers, mill-owners and loggers. Her ancestors came to Nova Scotia before the American Revolution and included English, Scotch, Welsh and Irish people. They seem to have been a family of singers on both paternal and maternal sides.

Carrie married Almon Roy Grover in 1896, and settled in Gorham. The couple had three children: Gertrude, Ethel, and Roy.

== Folk songs ==
Having gained a reputation as a folk singer, in 1941, she recorded 87 songs and fiddle tunes for the Library of Congress. The Librarian of Congress reported: "Mrs. Grover sat before the microphone and recorded twenty-six discs. Some of her ballads date back a hundred years or more." Recordings of Grover also formed part of the Eloise Hubbard Linscott collection. She was the only woman among the several New England fiddlers included, and Linscott was especially proud to have collected from her. Linscott wrote admiringly that "what she didn't sing she played on her fiddle from a repertoire of more than 400 songs”.

Grover corresponded extensively with Alan Lomax, Sidney Robertson Cowell, and Helen Creighton.

In 1953, Grover gathered around 140 songs for self-publication. Helping her was Fred Lincoln Hill, who described the songs as ranging "from those of her grandparents and those her mother and father sang, to those which her brothers learned as lumbermen and sailors on the coasting vessels of that period."

The book may never get any further than being a family record of many of the old tunes. But as such it is a permanent account of the music and lives of the people who knew the songs and sang them at their work, or in the evenings when folks gathered for a “sing” and each member of the company present sang their favorites. Perhaps the voices were not always true to key, but if those of Mrs. Grover and her family are examples there must have been many fine voices raised in the songs of long ago.

Carrie Grover’s A Heritage of Songs was published by Gould Academy when Carrie was in her 70s, first intended to capture the songs for her grandchildren and great grandchildren. "Because she feels so strongly that the old songs should not be allowed to die," Hill wrote, "Mrs. Grover has made heroic efforts to preserve the tunes. There are many collections of the verses but not many which include a tune for every poem.

== Death ==
Grover died in 1959 aged 79. She was buried in Eastern Cemetery, Gorham, alongside her husband.
