= Full Moon (Paul Brady album) =

1986 live album by Paul Brady

Live album by Paul Brady
- Released: 1986
- Genre: Rock; folk
- Label: PeeBee Music
- Producer: Paul Brady; Phil Palmer

Paul Brady chronology
Back to the Centre (1986)	Full Moon (1986)	Primitive Dance (1987)

Full Moon is a 1986 album by Irish singer/songwriter Paul Brady, his first live album. It was recorded live at The Half Moon, Putney, London, UK on Friday 6 April 1984.

== Track listing ==
1. "Hard Station"
2. "Not The Only One"
3. "Take Me Away"
4. "Busted Loose"
5. "Dance The Romance"
6. "Crazy Dreams"
7. "Helpless Heart"
8. "Steel Claw"

== Personnel ==
- Paul Brady - vocals, acoustic guitar
- Ian Maidman - bass
- Kenny Craddock - keyboards
- Terry Williams - drums
- Phil Palmer - guitars, vocals
