= Häufebecher =

A häufebecher (German: stacking cup) is a stackable beaker, usually made of silver. They were well established in Germany by the 16th century and are often highly valued by antiques collectors.
