= Oh What a World (album) =

Studio album by Paul Brady
- Released: 2000
- Genre: Rock, folk
- Label: PeeBee Music
- Producer: Paul Brady, Alastair McMillan

Paul Brady chronology
Nobody Knows: The Best of Paul Brady (1999)	Oh What a World (2000)	Say What You Feel (2005)

Oh What a World is a 2000 album by the Irish singer/songwriter Paul Brady, his eighth solo album. It reached number 3 in the Irish Album Chart in May 2000.

== Track listing ==
1. "Sea of Love" (Paul Brady)
2. "I Believe in Magic" (Paul Brady, Gary Nicholson)
3. "Love Hurts" (Paul Brady)
4. "Oh What a World" (Paul Brady, Will Jennings)
5. "The Long Goodbye" (Paul Brady, Ronan Keating)
6. "The Law of Love" (Angelo Palladino, Marie Wilson, Paul Brady)
7. "Believe in Me" (Paul Brady, Carole King)
8. "Good Love" (Bob Theile, Paul Brady)
9. "Travellin' Light" (Conner Reeves, Paul Brady)
10. "Minutes Away, Miles Apart" (Dean Grakal, Debbie Peterson, Paul Brady)
11. "Try Me One More Time" (Mark Hudson, Paul Brady)
