= Recruiting sergeant =

1855–1865 painting of two British Army recruiting sergeants in an English village

A recruiting sergeant is a British or American soldier of the rank of sergeant who is tasked to enlist recruits. The term originated in the British army of the eighteenth and nineteenth centuries. The Irish playwright George Farquhar served as an English Army officer, and the characters in his play The Recruiting Officer (1706) are drawn from life.

If any gentlemen soldiers, or others, have a mind to serve Her Majesty, and pull down the French king; if any prentices have severe masters, any children have unnatural parents; if any servants have too little wages, or any husband too much wife; let them repair to the noble Sergeant Kite, at the Sign of the Raven, in this good town of Shrewsbury, and they shall receive present relief and entertainment.

The unscrupulous methods used by some to trick the innocent have been the subject of several traditional songs composed by their victims as a warning to others, popular examples being the Irish traditional song Arthur McBride and the Scots Twa Recruiting Sergeants. A recruit would be given the King's shilling as a mark of the contract made. The term has passed into the English language to mean any set of circumstances which recruits or fails to recruit volunteers to the army. See Daily Telegraph headline The CIA is al-Qaeda's best recruiting sergeant

== See also ==
- Press gang - Officially sanctioned gangs who once kidnapped people to serve in the military or navy, usually by force and without notice.
