= King's shilling =

Earnest payment to British armed forces recruits

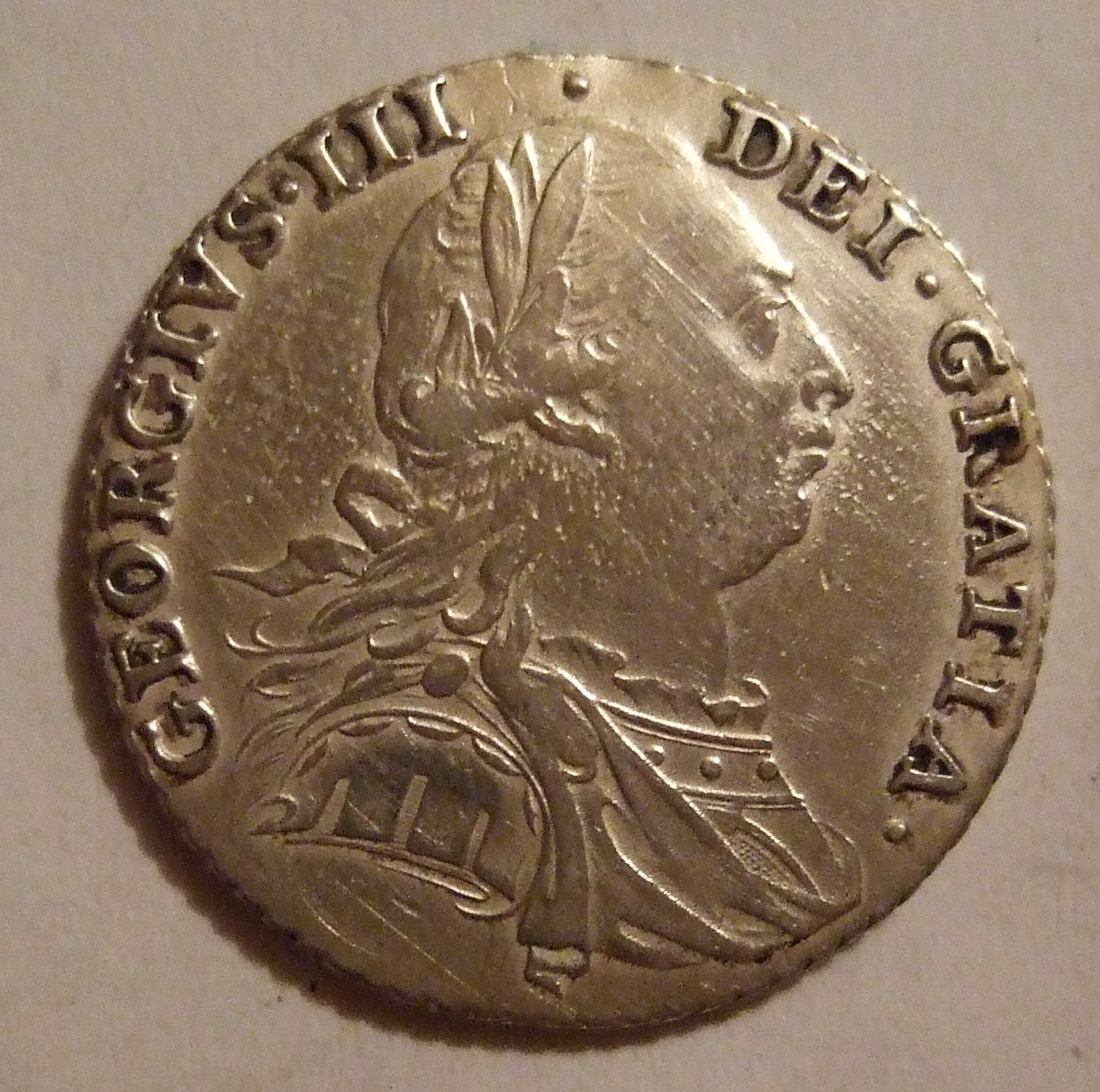
A shilling bearing the face of George III, the British monarch from 1760 to 1820

The King's shilling, sometimes called the Queen's shilling when the sovereign is female, is a historical slang term referring to the earnest payment of one shilling given to recruits to the armed forces of the United Kingdom in the 18th, 19th and 20th centuries, although the practice dates back to the end of the English Civil War. To "take the King's shilling" was to agree to serve as a sailor or soldier in the Royal Navy or the British Army. It is closely related to the act of impressment. The practice officially stopped in 1879, although the term is still used informally and there are some cases of it being used still in the early 20th century, albeit largely symbolically.

== British Army ==
A recruit was still entitled to return the shilling until becoming subject to military law upon formal attestation before a Justice of the Peace. At this point, a more substantial bounty was paid to the new recruit, which fluctuated from two guineas to a high of £23/17/6d in 1812. However, this payment generally was quickly lost to various duties and dues, such as uniform. The monetary amount of this bounty, which might be equivalent to half a year's wages for the average unskilled worker, was enough to persuade most potential recruits to join. Those who hesitated were often won over by making them intoxicated with strong drink. The bounty was lucrative enough for some to repeatedly desert, then re-enlist. One man was hanged in 1787 for 47 repeat offences. The pay for a private in the English Army was originally one shilling a day. A soldier was expected to pay for food and clothing out of his wages after using the initial sign-up bounty to purchase his initial equipment. It was not until 1847 that a limit was placed on deductions, ensuring that each soldier was paid at least one penny (a twelfth of a shilling) a day, after deductions.

1855–1865 painting of British Army recruiting sergeants persuading English villagers to take the queen's shilling

Novel incentives were sometimes used to persuade soldiers to enlist in the army. Jane Gordon, Duchess of Gordon, was known to tour Scotland with a shilling in her lips for anyone wishing to join up to take. The 1914 song "I'll Make a Man of You" posits a "new recruiting scheme" in which the female singer states: "On Saturday I'm willing, if you'll only take the shilling, to make a man of any one of you."

== Royal Navy ==
Press gangs had the power to compel British seamen into the Royal Navy. A man forced unwillingly into the Navy in this way was given the King's shilling, but was often offered a chance to volunteer: a volunteer would be eligible for an advance of two months' wages and would be treated more favourably than their pressed counterparts. Clothes and equipment, such as a hammock, had to be bought from the ship's purser out of the advance. Volunteers were also protected from creditors, up to the value of £20. This protection was increased to £30 by the 1860s.

There are recurring tales of sailors being pressed after a shilling was slipped into their drink, leading to glass-bottomed tankards. However, this is likely to be a myth, for the Navy could press by force, rendering deception unnecessary.

== Present day ==
Joining the British Army is still unofficially described as "taking the King's shilling". This includes non-British and Commonwealth soldiers who join the British Army. At least one airman was given the King's shilling upon attestation into the Royal Air Force in 1948. The phrase has been used to refer to other modern practices, for instance to a member of the British House of Commons accepting an office of profit under the Crown, such as the Crown Steward and Bailiff of the Manor of Northstead, in order to vacate their seats, as resigning is not permitted. It has also been used to describe pay and expenses of Members of Parliament.

It has been used metaphorically for other activities paid for by the British Government. Employees of post offices that were bailed out have been referred to as taking the shilling, as have Conservative MPs accused of lobbying, and judges upon taking office.
