= The Blessing (rock band) =

British rock band

The Blessing was a British musical group led by William Topley, whose music featured elements of blues, gospel, soul, and rock. The group released two albums and had one UK Top 40 hit before disbanding.

== History ==
The Blessing was founded in London in 1987, initially acting mostly as a blues and reggae cover band. The group began writing its own material and recorded in keyboardist Mike Westergaard's studio, eventually landing a recording contract in 1989 with MCA Records. Their debut, Prince of the Deep Water, followed in 1991, with the lead single "Highway 5" reaching #42 on the UK Singles Chart. The single was remixed and re-released at the end of the year and re-charted early in 1992, this time peaking at #30. Prince of the Deep Water featured guest musicians Nicky Hopkins, Richard Tee, Jeff Porcaro, Rickie Lee Jones, and Bruce Hornsby, and went on to sell 125,000 copies.

For the follow-up full-length, Locusts & Wild Honey, Jimmy Miller was called in to produce three tracks, though he died before the album's release. One of the tracks he produced, "Soul Love", was released as the album's lead single, peaking at #73 on the UK Singles Chart. Due to the high cost of recording the group's first album and restructuring at label MCA, the band was seen as not sufficiently commercially viable and lost support from the label, splintering soon after. Topley secured a contract with Mercury a few years later as a solo artist.

== Members ==
- William Topley – vocals
- Luke Brighty – guitar
- Kevin Hime-Knowles – bass
- Mike Westergaard – keyboards
- Simon Hanson – drums

== Discography ==
Albums

- Prince of the Deep Water (MCA Records, 1991)
- Locusts and Wild Honey (Polygram, 1998)
- Best of the Blessing: Highway 5 (Castle Music, 2000)

EPs

- "The Blessing" (MCA Records, 4 Track Promo, 1991)
- "Locusts & Wild Honey" (MCA Records, 4 Track Promo, 1993)

Singles

- "Highway 5" (MCA Records, 1991)
- "Hurricane Room"(MCA Records, 1991)
- "Highway 5 '92" (MCA Records, 1992)
