= William Topley (musician) =

British musician

William Topley is a British musician. He was the lead singer of the band The Blessing in the early 1990s, releasing two albums before breaking up. He was signed as a solo artist by Mercury Nashville after Luke Lewis, who had worked at The Blessing's label MCA, became president of Mercury. Barry Beckett produced Topley's debut album, which appeared in 1997. He continued recording through the 2000s.

== Discography ==
Solo

- Black River (Polygram, 1997)
- Mixed Blessing (Polygram, 1998)
- Spanish Wells (Mercury, 1999)
- Feasting With Panthers (Lost Highway, 2002)
- Sea Fever (Warner Bros., 2005)
- All in the Downs (Self-released, 2007)
- Water Taxi (Self-released, 2009) [with The Sea Gypsies]
- South on Velvet Clouds (Self-released, 2011)
- Aristocrats of the South Seas (Self-released, 2012) [with The Sea Gypsies]
- Halved Moons & Hooded Mountains (2016) [with The Black River Band]
- Amidst the Alien Cane (2020)
- Back at the Napoleon House (2020)

With The Blessing

- Prince of the Deep Water (MCA, 1991)
- Locusts & Wild Honey (Polygram, 1994)
- The Best of the Blessing: Highway 5 (Castle Music, 2000)
- Sugar Train [DVD + CD]
