= Paul Brady =

Irish musician

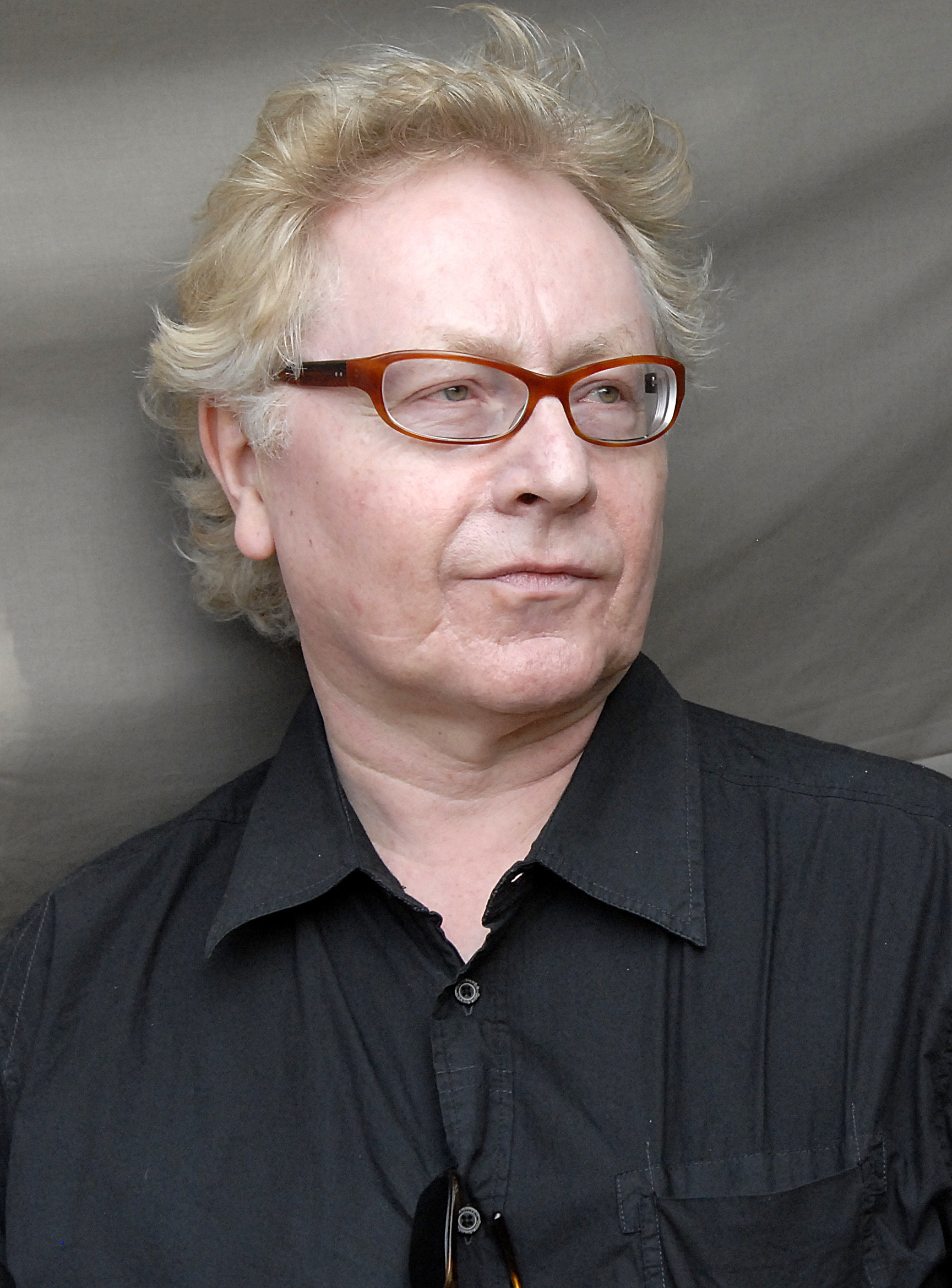
- Brady in 2009

Background information
- Born: Paul Joseph Brady; 19 May 1947 (age 79); Belfast, Northern Ireland
- Origin: Strabane, County Tyrone, Northern Ireland
- Genres: Folk; Irish traditional; pop; rock; adult contemporary
- Occupations: Singer-songwriter; musician
- Instruments: Vocals; guitar; piano; mandolin; bouzouki; tin whistle
- Years active: 1965–present
- Labels: Shanachie; Fontana; Mercury; PeeBee Music; Green Linnet
- Website: paulbrady.com

Paul Joseph Brady (born 19 May 1947) is a Northern Irish singer-songwriter and musician from Strabane, Northern Ireland. His work straddles folk and pop. He was interested in a wide variety of music from an early age.

Initially popular for playing Irish traditional music in a duo with Andy Irvine and later with Tommy Peoples and Matt Molloy and solo, he later turned to a more rock-inspired electric style with poignant political lyrics. Some of his most popular songs are his interpretations of the traditional "The Lakes of Pontchartrain" and "Arthur McBride", and the originals "Crazy Dreams", "Nothing but the Same Old Story", "The Island", "Night Hunting Time", "Steel Claw" performed by Tina Turner, "Paradise Is Here", "The World is What You Make It" and "Once in a Lifetime".

== Early life ==
Paul Joseph Brady was born in Belfast and raised in the small town of Strabane in County Tyrone, Northern Ireland, on the border with County Donegal, Republic of Ireland. His father Seán Brady and mother Mollie Brady née McElholm were school teachers. Brady was educated at Sion Mills Primary School, St. Columb's College, Derry and University College Dublin. He is featured in the documentary film The Boys of St. Columb's.

He began learning piano around age six and by the age of eleven he had begun to play guitar, spending hours of his school holidays learning every song that the Shadows had recorded. He was also influenced by Chuck Berry.

In 1963, Brady began performing as a piano player in a hotel in Bundoran, Donegal. In October 1964, he attended University College Dublin and performed with a number of RnB groups, covering songs by the likes of Ray Charles and James Brown. The first of these was the Inmates (late 1964–about April 1965), which evolved into the Kult (about April–December 1965), featuring Brady, Jackie McAuley (ex-Them, and future Belfast Gypsies and Trader Horne), Brendan Bonass, and Dave Pennefather. Brady can be seen in the documentary film Charlie Is My Darling waiting outside Dublin's Adelphi Theatre for the Rolling Stones' concert of 3 September 1965. He next joined Rootzgroup (late 1965–May 1966) and Rockhouse (about May–December 1966).

== Musical career ==
=== 1960s and 1970s ===
During his time at college in Dublin, the country saw a huge rise in interest in traditional Irish music. Brady joined the popular Irish band The Johnstons when Michael Johnston left in May 1967. They moved to London, England, in 1969 and subsequently to New York City in 1972 to expand their audience. Despite some success, Brady returned to Ireland in 1974 to join the Irish group Planxty, the band that would subsequently launch the solo careers of Andy Irvine, Liam O'Flynn, Dónal Lunny, and Christy Moore.

When Planxty disbanded in late 1975, Brady formed a duo with Irvine from 1976 to 1978, a partnership that produced the successful album, Andy Irvine/Paul Brady. The next few years saw him establish his popularity and reputation as one of Ireland's best interpreters of traditional songs. His versions of ballads like "Arthur McBride" and "The Lakes of Pontchartrain" were considered definitive and are still popular at concerts today. In 1975 in New York he recorded two albums for Shanachie Records as guitar accompanist to resident Irish fiddlers Andy McGann and Paddy Reynolds. He also recorded a 1976 album, The High Part of the Road, for the same label with Irish fiddler Tommy Peoples. And a 1977 Shanachie album with another Irish fiddler named John Vesey.

=== Solo career ===
In 1978, Brady released his first solo album, Welcome Here Kind Stranger, which won him critical acclaim and was awarded the Melody Maker Folk Album of the Year. However, it would prove to be Brady's last album covering traditional material. He decided to delve into pop and rock music, and released his first album of this genre in 1981, Hard Station.

Brady released a number of successful solo albums throughout the 1980s: True for You (1983), Back to the Centre (1986), and Primitive Dance (1987). By the end of the decade, Brady was recognised and accepted as a respected performer and songwriter. His songs were being covered by a number of other artists, including Santana and Dave Edmunds.

When Tina Turner heard a demo of his song "Paradise Is Here", she recorded it for her Break Every Rule album of 1986. By now, he was a favourite songwriter among such artists as Bob Dylan and Bonnie Raitt, who would do a duet with Brady on his 1991 album, Trick or Treat. A couple of Brady songs soon appeared on Raitt's album Luck of the Draw, including the title track.

Dylan was sufficiently impressed by Brady's work to name-check him in the booklet of his 2006 compilation album The Collection.

In 1991, Brady reached number 5 in the Irish Singles Chart with Nobody Knows.

Since his Hard Station album (1981), Brady was on various major labels until he created his own label, PeeBee Music, in the late 1990s. He released three albums in the 1990s: Trick or Treat, Songs & Crazy Dreams (a remixed compilation of earlier songs) and Spirits Colliding, which were met with critical acclaim. Trick or Treat was on Fontana/Mercury Records and received a lot of promotion. As a result, some critics considered it his debut album and noted that the record benefited from the expertise of experienced studio musicians, as well as producer Gary Katz, who worked with the rock group Steely Dan. Rolling Stone, after praising Brady's earlier but less-known solo records, called Trick or Treat Brady's "most compelling collection."

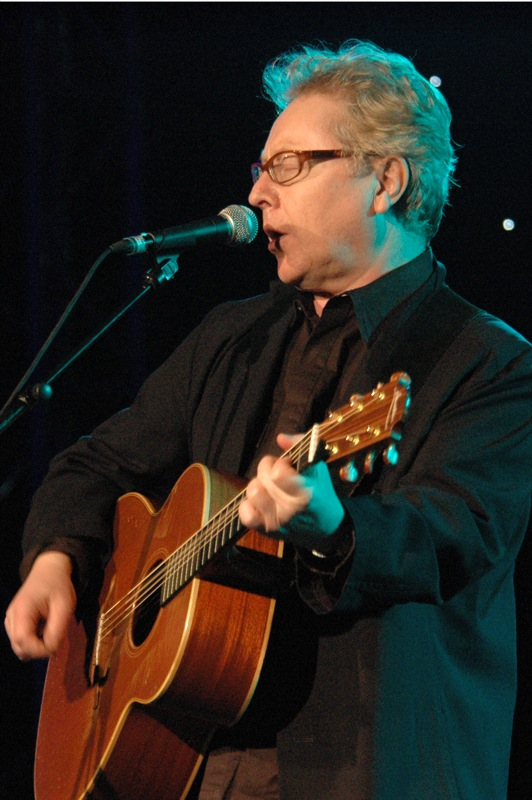
Brady performing in 2006

Brady went on to record several other albums (15 in total since he went solo in 1978) and collaborated with a number of other established musicians including Bonnie Raitt and Richard Thompson. In 2006, he collaborated with Cara Dillon on the track "The Streets of Derry" from her album After the Morning. He has also worked with Fiachra Trench.

He performed Irish language songs as a character in the 2002 Matthew Barney film Cremaster 3. He also played tin whistle on the single "One" by Greg Pearle in 2008, from the album Beautiful You, a collaboration between Greg Pearle and John Illsley; this song featured in the 2008 film Anton, directed by Graham Cantwell.

Brady's fifteenth studio album, Hooba Dooba, was released in March 2010.

As of 2017, a friendship was struck with Theo Katzman (vulfpeck) and Brady toured Ireland in 2019 as half of this duo with Joe Dart, also of vulfpeck, Louis Cato and Lee Pardini.

Brady had continued to tour, record and collaborate with other artists. In 2019, Jimmy Buffett began performing a cover of Brady's hit, "The World is What you Make It". In September 2019, Brady joined Jimmy Buffett on his tour stops in both Dublin and London.

He released the album "Unfinished Business" on his own label PeeBee Music, licensed to Proper Music UK, in 2017.

While Brady and Andy Irvine's planned tour of their 1976 album Andy Irvine, Paul Brady was impacted by the COVID-19 pandemic, they finished the tour in 2022. Musicians to join them on the tour included fiddle player Kevin Burke and multi-instrumentalist Dónal Lunny, both of whom had played on the original album.

== Awards ==
In 2009, Brady received an honorary degree of Doctor of Letters from the University of Ulster, in recognition of his services to traditional Irish music and songwriting.

== Discography ==
=== Solo studio albums ===
- Welcome Here Kind Stranger (1978)
- Hard Station (1981)
- True for You (1983)
- Back to the Centre (1986)
- Primitive Dance (1987)
- Trick or Treat (1991)
- Spirits Colliding (1995)
- Oh What a World (2000)
- Say What You Feel (2005)
- Hooba Dooba (2010)
- Unfinished Business (2017)
- Maybe So (2022)

=== Solo live albums ===
- Full Moon (1984)
- The Paul Brady Songbook (album and DVD) Live recordings for RTÉ TV series (2002)
- The Missing Liberty Tapes (2002) - Recorded Live at Liberty Hall, Dublin, 21 July 1978

=== Solo compilation albums ===
- Songs & Crazy Dreams (1992)
- Nobody Knows: The Best of Paul Brady (1999)
- Dancer in the Fire: A Paul Brady Anthology (2012)

=== With Andy Irvine ===
- Andy Irvine/Paul Brady (1976)
- Andy Irvine/70th Birthday Concert at Vicar St 2012 (2014)

=== With Tommy Peoples ===
- The High Part of the Road (1975)

=== With Matt Molloy and Tommy Peoples ===
- Molloy, Brady, Peoples (1977)

=== With Andy McGann and Paddy Reynolds ===
- Fiddle Duet (1976)

=== With Andy McGann ===
- It's a Hard Road to Travel (1977)

=== With John Vesey ===
- The First Month of Spring (1977)

=== With John Kavanagh and Sean O'Casey ===
- The Green Crow Caws (1980)

=== With various artists ===
- The Gathering (1981), Greenhays Recordings, Paul Brady, Peter Browne, Andy Irvine, Dónal Lunny, Matt Molloy, Tommy Potts, Tríona Ní Dhomhnaill (Brady plays on three tracks)
- Feed The Folk (1985), Temple Records, ("The Green Fields Of Canada")
- The Rough Guide to Irish Music (2005), World Music Network, ("Mary and the Soldier")
- An Irish Goodbye with Willie Nile on The Great Yellow Light (2025)

=== DVDs ===
- The Transatlantic Sessions Series 3 (2007) (various artists)
- The Paul Brady Songbook (2002)
- Paul Brady Live at Rockpalast 1983 (Repertoire Records 2016)
