= The Island (Paul Brady song) =

1985 song by Irish musician Brady

Song by Paul Brady
- Released: 1985

"The Island" is a 1985 song by an Irish musician Paul Brady.

The song appeared on the album 'Back to the Centre', and features Kenny Craddock on piano. The only other instrument is a guitar solo by Phil Palmer The album was produced by long time Brady collaborator Jennifer Maidman (formerly known as Ian Maidman).

The start of the song compares the tragic events of the Lebanese Civil War with the Troubles in Northern Ireland in the 1980s. Comments are made on activities in Northern Ireland: "They're rising banners over by the markets / Whitewashing slogans on the shipyard wall". "The Markets" is a well known Republican area surrounding St George's Market in Belfast, and the shipyard is that of Harland and Wolff in East Belfast, near a Loyalist area. The song then compares the peace and serenity of making love on the island with the hypocrisy of some religious leaders and the tragedy of young people being "sacrificed" (on both sides) for political beliefs.

The song was referred to pejoratively through a refrain of "the island" in Christy Moore's song The Other Side, a song in support of those detained in Long Kesh. However, Christy Moore later toned down the lyrics in this song and rerecorded it in 2011 as Tyrone Boys.
