= List of programmes broadcast by TG4 =

This is a list of current and former television programmes broadcast on TG4 and its children's programming block Cúla4.

== Current programming ==
=== Chat ===
- 7 Lá
- Ardán

=== Children's ===
- 50/50 Heroes
- Adventure Time
- Animal Fanpedia
- Angelo Rules
- Balloon Barnyard
- Bia Linn
- Blocuimhreacha
- Breadwinners
- Camp Lakebottom
- Cat a' Hata
- Charlie agus Lola
- Clarence
- Clifford
- CoComelon
- Curious George
- Daisy & Ollie
- Dee Dee
- Deer Squad
- Digley & Dazey
- Dinosaur Train
- Dodo
- Dónall Dána
- Dora
- Dot
- Elmo Anseo
- Gearóid na Gaisce
- Igam Ogam
- Jamie's Got Tentacles!
- Johnny Test
- Kid-E-Cats
- Miraculous
- Olobob Top
- Pat an Madra
- Peg & Cat
- PJ Masks
- Na Polos
- Rita & Crogall
- Sadie Sparks
- Saol faoi Shráid
- Seal le Timmy
- SpongeBob SquarePants
- Taffy
- That's Joey
- True and the Rainbow Kingdom
- Woozle & Pip
- Wussywat
- Zak Jinks
- Zou

=== Comedy ===
- C.U. Burn
- Fear an Phoist
- FFC
- Gleann Ceo
- The Golden Girls
- Luí na Gréine
- The Waltons
- The Wonder Years

=== Dating ===
- Eochair an ghrá
- Paisean Faisean

=== Documentary ===
- Ag Trasnú an Atlantaigh Dhuibh
- Ár gClub
- Bádóirí
- Bean an Tí
- Ceolchuairt
- Cogar
- Éalú
- An Fhidil Bheo - Ceol an Northern Fiddler
- Fíorscéal
- Méirligh
- No Béarla
- Scothfhoirne
- Seal le Dáithí
- Tabú
- Thar Sáile
- Timpeall na Tíre
- Tríd an Lionsa
- Uachtaráin
- Wwoofáil

=== Drama ===
- Aifric
- The Almighty Johnsons
- Borgen
- Better Call Saul
- Friday Night Lights
- Gilmore Girls
- The Killing
- Murder, She Wrote
- Nashville
- Ros na Rún
- Seacht / Seven
- The Vampire Diaries

=== History ===
- Cartaí Poist
- Éire Neodrach
- Séideán Staire
- Siar Sna...

=== Music ===
- Flosc
- Geantraí
- Gradam Ceoil TG4
- Hup
- Is Maith liom Pop
- Nollaig No. 1
- Réalta agus Gaolta
- Scór Encore
- Sé mo Laoch
- Slí na mBeaglaoich
- TradFest

=== News ===
- Euronews
- France 24
- Nuacht TG4

=== Sport ===
- GAA Beo
- Rugbaí Beo
- Sacar Beo
- Underdogs
- Wimbledon Beo

=== Travel ===
- Amú le Hector
- Hecor i Meiriceá
- Hector san Afraic
- Hector san Astráil
- Neelo

== Former programming ==
- 8 Simple Rules (comedy)
- America's Next Top Model (reality)
- Amú Amigos (travel)
- An Audience with Billy Connolly (comedy)
- Angela Anaconda (children's)
- Animal Mechanicals (children's)
- The Animals of Farthing Wood (children's) (Original English voices can be still screened on RTÉ)
- Animated Tales of the World (children's) (also airs on RTÉ)
- Animaniacs (children's) (still airs on RTÉ years later)
- Army Wives (drama)
- Arthur (children's)
- Baby Bollies (children's) (also aired on RTÉ)
- Back at the Barnyard (children's)
- Baby Looney Tunes (children's)
- The Baskervilles (children's)
- The Batman (children's)
- Bo on the Go! (children's)
- Bouli (children's) (originally aired on RTÉ, later returned to air on RTÉ in 1999 with an English dub)
- Ben 10 (Original series) (children's)
- Ben 10: Alien Force (Humungousaur) (children's)
- Bert and Ernie's Great Adventures (children's)
- Blinky Bill (children's)
- Bonanza (comedy)
- Breaking Bad (drama)
- The Brothers Flub (children's) (originally aired on TV3)
- Britt Allcroft's Magic Adventures of Mumfie (children's) (later aired on RTÉ still dubbed in Irish)
- The Canterbury Tales (children's)
- Carnivàle (drama)
- Camp Lazlo (children's)
- Charley and Mimmo (children's)
- Chop Socky Chooks (children's)
- CinderElmo (children's)
- Clifford the Big Red Dog (children's)
- Cocco Bill (children's)
- Coconut Fred's Fruit Salad Island! (children's)
- Codename: Kids Next Door (children's)
- The Cramp Twins (children's)
- Cat Tales (children's)
- Clang Invasion (children's)
- Cold Case (drama)
- Curb Your Enthusiasm (comedy)
- Cybernet (magazine)
- Dastardly and Muttley in Their Flying Machines (children's) (originally aired on RTÉ)
- Delfy and His Friends (children's)
- Doodlebops (children's)
- Dragon Tales (children's)
- Driver Dan's Story Train (children's) (Now on 3e)
- Doctor Who (science fiction)
- Edgar and Ellen (children's)
- Eliot Kid (children's)
- Eloise: The Animated Series (children's)
- Eve (comedy)
- Everwood (drama)
- Elmo's World (children's)
- E-Ring (drama)
- Fairy Tale Police Department (children's)
- Fanboy & Chum Chum (children's)
- Firehouse Tales (children's)
- Flash Gordon Conquers the Universe (science fiction)
- Flipper & Lopaka (children's)
- Foster's Home for Imaginary Friends (children's)
- Four Eyes! (children's)
- Freaky Stories (children's)
- Fraggle Rock (children's) (originally aired on RTÉ)
- Franny's Feet (children's)
- The Further Adventures of SuperTed (children's)
- Fun with Claude (children's)
- The Garfield Show (children's)
- Generation O! (children's)
- George Lopez (comedy)
- Global Grover (children's)
- Gossip Girl (drama)
- Gogs (Claymation)
- Hareport (children's)
- Horseland (children's)
- Higglytown Heroes (children's)
- Hiudai T.N.T. (children's)
- The Hoobs (children's)
- I.N.K. Invisible Network of Kids (children's)
- Incredible Story Studios (children's)
- Inspector Gadget (1983) (original series) (children's) (originally aired on RTÉ, later returned to air on RTÉ in 2000)
- Invasion (drama)
- In a Heartbeat (children's)
- Jay Jay the Jet Plane (children's)
- Jungledyret Hugo (children's)
- Junior/J-squad (children's)
- Justice League (children's)
- Kappa Mikey (children's)
- Kirby: Right Back at Ya! (children's)
- Kong: The Animated Series (children's)
- Kangoos (children's)
- Lapitch the Little Shoemaker (children's)
- The Life and Times of Juniper Lee (children's)
- The Little Lulu Show (children's)
- Little Monsters (children's) (later aired on RTÉ)
- Lipstick Jungle (drama)
- Life with Derek (children's)
- Lizzie McGuire (children's)
- Lola & Virginia (children's)
- Looney Tunes (children's) (originally aired on RTÉ)
- Loopdidoo (children's)
- Lou! (children's)
- The Lucy Show (comedy)
- Machair (soap opera)
- Madison (drama)
- The Man from U.N.C.L.E. (drama)
- Milo (children's)
- Mimi and Mr. Bobbo (children's)
- Monster Allergy (children's)
- Monster Rancher (children's)
- Muppets Tonight (comedy) (originally aired on RTÉ)
- The Muppet Show (comedy) (originally aired on RTÉ)
- The Mr. Men Show (children's)
- My Spy Family (children's)
- Nick & Perry (children's)
- The Nightmare Room (children's)
- Nip/Tuck (drama)
- The O.C. (drama)
- Old Tom (children's)
- Olivia (children's)
- One Tree Hill (drama)
- Oz (drama)
- Patrol 03 (children's)
- Peppa Pig (children's) (later aired on RTÉ)
- Pigs Next Door (children's)
- Pingu (children's)
- The Pinky and Perky Show (children's)
- Play with Me Sesame (children's)
- Poochini's Yard (children's)
- Potatoes and Dragons (children's)
- Power Rangers in Space (children's)
- Power Rangers Turbo (children's)
- Pet Alien (children's)
- Puppy in My Pocket: Adventures in Pocketville (children's)
- Redakai: Conquer the Kairu (children's)
- Rainbow Fish (children's)
- Robot Wars (Original series) (with commentary dubbed in Irish)
- Romuald the Reindeer (children's) (later aired on RTÉ)
- Sandra the Fairytale Detective (children's)
- Spaced Out (children's)
- Stone Protectors (children's)
- Stories from My Childhood (children's)
- Skeleton Warriors (children's)
- Starhill Ponies (children's)
- Sali Mali (children's)
- Samantha Who? (comedy)
- Samurai Jack (children's)
- Scaredy Squirrel (children's)
- Scooby-Doo and Scrappy-Doo (children's) (originally aired on RTÉ)
- Seó Luna (children's)
- Shaggy & Scooby-Doo Get a Clue! (children's)
- Simba: The King Lion (children's) (later aired on RTÉ)
- Six Feet Under (drama)
- Small Stories (children's)
- Squirrel Boy (children's)
- The Starter Wife (comedy / drama)
- Superman: The Animated Series (children's)
- SuperTed (children's) (originally aired on RTÉ)
- Survivor (reality)
- S.O.S. Croc (children's)
- Tractor Tom (children's) (also airs on RTÉ)
- Tabaluga (children's)
- Tec the Tractor (children's)
- Tom and Jerry (children's) (originally aired on RTÉ)
- Tom and Jerry Tales (children's)
- Tommy and Oscar (children's)
- Twipsy (children's)
- Teletubbies (Original Series) (children's) (also airs on RTÉ)
- Teo (children's)
- TG4 Cruinneas! (children's)
- The Mighty B! (children's)
- The Three Friends and Jerry (children's)
- The Triplets (Children's)
- Time Squad (children's)
- ToddWorld (children's)
- Top Cat (children's) (also airs on RTÉ)
- True Blood (drama)
- Twipsy (children's)
- Two and a Half Men (comedy)
- UBOS (children's)
- Undergrads (animation)
- Vanished (drama)
- Watership Down (children's) (also airs on RTÉ)
- Weird-Ohs (children's)
- Wendy (children's)
- Whatever Happened to... Robot Jones? (children's)
- What About Mimi (children's)
- What I Like About You (comedy)
- What's New, Scooby-Doo? (children's) (later aired on RTÉ)
- Winx Club (children's)
- Wipeout (game show) (partly Irish)
- The Wire (drama)
- Witch World (children's)
- Without a Trace (drama)
- Wonder Pets! (children's)
- X-DuckX (children's)
- Xiaolin Showdown (children's)
- Zirkos Kids (children's)
