= James Kelly (fiddler) =

Irish fiddler

James Kelly Séamus Ó Ceallaigh
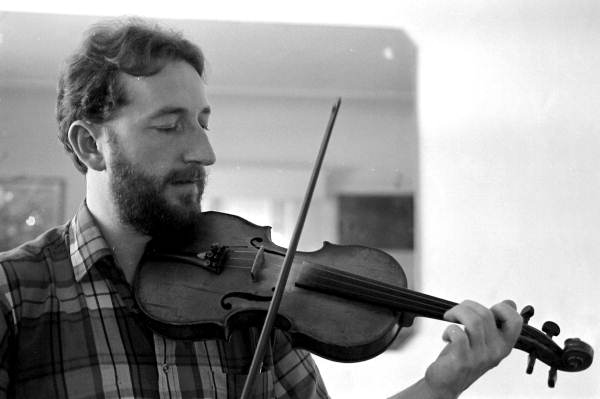
- Kelly playing in Miami, 1989

Background information
- Born: January 10, 1957 (age 69); Capel Street, Dublin, Ireland
- Genres: Folk; Traditional Irish; Irish fiddle
- Occupations: Musician; composer; collector; researcher; teacher
- Instrument: Fiddle
- Years active: 1971–present
- Labels: Claddagh Records; Gael Linn; Green Linnet Records; Rounder Records; Shanachie Records; Tara Music
- Website: jameskellymusic.com
- Parents: John Kelly; Frances Hilliard

James Kelly (Irish: Séamus Ó Ceallaigh; born 1957) is an Irish fiddler, composer, collector, researcher and teacher from Dublin. He is the son of County Clare fiddler, John Kelly, and has played with various groups including Patrick Street and Planxty. Kelly has been described by The Journal of Music as "one of the greatest Irish traditional fiddlers alive today" and by Cathy Benton, Professor of Music at Missouri Baptist University, as "one of the top 10 fiddlers in the world".

== Early life ==
Kelly was born into a musical family in Capel Street, Dublin in 1957. His father, John Kelly, was a fiddle and concertina player from Kilbaha, County Clare. His father was also a founding member, along with Seán Ó Riada, of Ceoltóirí Chualann. His mother, Frances Hilliard, was from Shillelagh, County Wicklow. Together, they had 5 children: Michael, John Jnr, Anthony, Marianne and James, all musicians. Michael, John, Marianne and James played the fiddle and Anthony was a piper. When James was 3 years of age, his father began teaching him to play the fiddle. In 1960, his father purchased him a fiddle, made in Alsace-Lorraine in 1812.

== Career ==
Kelly's performing and recording career began in 1971 at the age of 14, with several broadcasts for RTÉ. At the age of 16, he won first place in the Fiddler of the Year competition and recorded his first album, a fiddle duet with his brother John, titled John & James Kelly: Irish Traditional Fiddle Music. During that time, he joined the group Ceoltóirí Laigheann, that included his father John, Paddy O'Brien, Mary Bergin, and Paddy Glackin. He recorded two albums with this group. The first, The Crooked Road, was a live recording of a 1973 concert held in University College Dublin to support Scoil Náisiúnta Naomh Gobnait, a Gaeltacht school in Dún Chaoin, County Kerry then threatened with closure. The second album, The Star Of Munster, was released in 1975 and has been described by Irish music critic Siobhán Long of The Irish Times as "widely influential".

In 1978, Kelly emigrated to the US. He spent the next three years touring the US with Paddy O'Brien and Dáithí Sproule as part of a group known as Bowhand and recorded two albums with the Shanachie Records label, Is It Yourself in 1979 and Spring In The Air in 1982. In 1982, Kelly joined Irish folk group Planxty and recorded on their Words & Music album in 1983. That same year, Kelly featured on Dolores Keane and John Faulkner's album, Sail Óg Rua. Kelly was also part of a quartet with Keane and Faulkner (and accordionist Jackie Daly), known as Kinvara, although they never recorded under such name. In 1985, he recorded with Danny McGinley on his album In Our Time.

In 1989, Kelly released his first solo album titled Capel Street, recorded in Rostrevor, County Down and Minneapolis, Minnesota. Accompanying him on the album were various musicians including Chuck Heymann (bodhrán), Josephine Keegan (piano), Arty McGlynn (guitar), Noreen O'Donoghue (harp, synthesizer) and Dáithí Sproule (guitar). Kelly was also a member of the group Patrick Street for a time and in 1990 recorded on their Irish Times album, featuring their well-known cover of "Music for a Found Harmonium". That same year, Kelly performed with various artists at the Boston College Irish Fiddle Festival, from which a live album was recorded and released in 1991 titled My Love Is In America. In 1995, Kelly recorded The Ring Sessions album with Zan McLeod. In 1996, Kelly released his second solo album, simply titled James Kelly. This album featured the accompaniment of Paddy Keenan (pipes), Zan McLeod (guitar, bouzouki, mandolin), Mark Stone (keyboards, bodhrán) and Daithí Connaughton (flute).

In 2001, Kelly was awarded the Florida Folk Heritage Award by the Florida Folklife Program in recognition of his "outstanding musicianship". Kelly released a third solo album in 2004, titled Melodic Journeys, which he recorded in Miami, Florida. That same year, Patrick Street's recording of "Music for a Found Harmonium" featured on the soundtrack of American comedy film, Napoleon Dynamite. In 2006, he was the recipient of the TG4 Traditional Musician of the Year Award at Gradam Ceoil TG4, Ireland's annual traditional music awards. In addition to his performing career, Kelly has composed over 800 tunes. In 2009, he released his first book of compositions titled 101 Traditional Irish Dance Tunes Composed by James Kelly, Volume 1. This collection contains 6 barn dances, 1 Highland Fling, 2 hornpipes, 31 double jigs, 7 slip jigs, 3 polkas, 42 reels, 5 slides, and 4 strathspeys. In 2010, the two albums Kelly recorded with Ceoltóirí Laigheann, The Crooked Road and The Star Of Munster, were reissued as a digitally remastered double CD under the title Cnuas. Siobhán Long of The Irish Times described the albums as "two seminal recordings".

== Personal life ==
Kelly moved to Miami from Dublin in 1984. Since settling there, he met American-born wife, Eve. Together, they had a son, Timothy, and a daughter, Sarah, also a fiddler. Outside of music, Kelly has worked in a gift shop that he and his wife, Eve, owned until 1991.

== Discography ==
Solo albums

- Capel Street (1989)
- James Kelly (1996)
- Melodic Journeys (2004)

Collaborations

- John & James Kelly (with John Kelly) (1974)
- The Ring Sessions (with Zan McLeod) (1995)

With Ceoltóirí Laighean

- The Crooked Road (1973)
- The Star of Munster (1975)
- Cnuas (2010)

With Bowhand

- Is It Yourself (1979)
- Spring In The Air (1982)
- Traditional Music of Ireland (1995)

With Planxty

- Words & Music (1983)

With Patrick Street

- Irish Times (1990)

Guest appearances

- Sail Óg Rua (by Dolores Keane & John Faulkner) (1983)
- In Our Time (by Danny McGinley) (1985)
- Up The Airy Mountain (by Sean O'Driscoll) (1988)
- Handprints (by Donna Long) (2005)

Festival albums

- My Love Is In America (The Boston College Irish Fiddle Festival) (1991)
- Music In The Meadow (Washington Irish Folk Festival, Wolf Trap) (1995)
- Gaelic Roots (Gaelic Roots Series, Boston College) (1996)

== Awards and nominations ==
=== Florida Folklife Program ===
Year	Nominee / work	Award	Result
2001	James Kelly	Florida Folk Heritage Award	Won

=== Gradam Ceoil TG4 ===
Year	Nominee / work	Award	Result
2006	James Kelly	Traditional Musician of the Year	Won
