= List of TG4 Traditional Musician of the Year recipients =

List of award-winning musicians

The TG4 Traditional Musician of the Year Award is given annually as part of Gradam Ceoil TG4. The award is to recognise the role of traditional Irish music and to ensure the task of carrying forward the Irish tradition into the future.

The following is a list of the recipients of the award.

- 1998 – Tommy Peoples, County Donegal
- 1999 – Matt Molloy, County Roscommon
- 2000 – Mary Bergin, Dublin
- 2001 – Máire Ní Chathasaigh, County Cork
- 2002 – Paddy Keenan, County Meath
- 2003 – John Carty, County Roscommon & London
- 2004 – Seán Keane, Dublin
- 2005 – Jackie Daly, County Cork
- 2006 – James Kelly, Dublin
- 2007 – Liam O'Flynn, County Kildare
- 2008 – Martin Hayes, County Clare
- 2009 – Charlie Harris, County Limerick
- 2010 – Seán McKiernan, County Galway & Boston
- 2011 – Noel Hill, County Clare
- 2012 – Bryan Rooney, County Leitrim
- 2013 – Dermot Byrne, County Donegal
- 2014 – Harry Bradley, County Antrim
- 2015 – Máirtín O'Connor, County Galway
- 2016 – Kevin Burke, County Sligo
- 2017 – Mairéad Ní Mhaonaigh, County Donegal
- 2018 – Frankie Gavin, County Galway
- 2019 – Catherine McEvoy, County Dublin
- 2020 – Laoise Kelly, County Mayo
- 2021 – Angelina Carberry, County Longford
- 2022 – Paddy Glackin, Áth Cliath
- 2023 - Mick O'Brien, County Dublin
- 2024 - Derek Hickey, County Limerick
- 2025 - Siobhán Peoples, County Clare
- 2026 - Cathal Hayden, County Tyrone
