= Liam O'Connor (fiddler) =

Liam O'Connor Liam Ó Conchubhair
- Born: 1984 (age 41–42); Baldoyle, County Dublin, Ireland
- Genres: Folk; Traditional Irish
- Occupations: Musician; collector; researcher; teacher; director (ITMA)
- Instrument: Fiddle
- Years active: 2000s–present
- Label: Independent
- Website: liamoconnor.ie
- Parent: Mick O'Connor

Liam O'Connor (Irish: Liam Ó Conchubhair; born 1984) is an Irish fiddler, collector, researcher and teacher from County Dublin. He is the current director of the Irish Traditional Music Archive (ITMA). O'Connor has been described by The Journal of Music as "one of the outstanding fiddle-players of his generation".

== Early life ==
O'Connor was born into a musical family in Baldoyle, a coastal village in Fingal, North County Dublin, Ireland. His father, Mick O'Connor, is a well-known flute player, researcher and leader of the Castle Céilí Band. His father grew up in The Liberties, Dublin and was a neighbour and friend of renowned fiddle player, Tommy Potts. His mother is from Ennistimon, County Clare, where O'Connor spent most of his childhood holidays attending music sessions with his father that featured fiddlers such as Joe Ryan, Bobby Casey, Peadar O'Loughlin and John Kelly. Numerous fiddlers that were friends of the family would regularly call around to the house in Baldoyle including Seán Keane of The Chieftains and Charlie Lennon. Other major influences on his playing include fiddlers such as Séamus Glackin, Vincent Harrison, along with recordings of Tommy Potts, Michael Coleman and James 'Lad' O'Beirne.

The youngest of four children, O'Connor followed in his siblings' footsteps and took up the fiddle at the age of 6, taking lessons from Dublin fiddler, Séamus Glackin. Liam also became acquainted with the concertina, which may have had an influence on some of his collaborations with concertina players later in his career. By the age of 15, O'Connor had won 5 All-Ireland fiddle competitions and later won both junior and senior Oireachtas fiddle competitions. He also completed 8 grades in classical violin training at the DIT College of Music, Dublin.

Outside of music, O'Connor was a talented Gaelic footballer, playing for Naomh Barróg, captaining Dublin at under-age level and later Coláiste Mhuire in the final of the Corn na Mac Léinn – the third-tier competition for Irish Third Level Institutions. O'Connor later gave up football because of the risk it posed to his music playing career due to its physicality, in particular citing an incident when he had to turn down an invitation to play with uilleann piper Liam O'Flynn because he was incapacitated by a football injury.

== Career ==
=== Music ===
O'Connor started performing as a soloist from a young age and as a teenager he was invited to perform as a duet with established masters such as Liam O'Flynn, concertina player Noel Hill and flute player Harry Bradley. When he was 17, he was awarded Young Musician of the Year at the 2002 Gradam Ceoil TG4. At the time, O'Connor was described in The Irish Times as:

Possibly one of the most exciting fiddle players on the music scene since the emergence of Seán Keane and Frankie Gavin more than 30 years ago. He has an exceptional natural ability and the standard of his playing defies logic given his age.

In 2005, O'Connor featured as a guest performer on Noel Hill's acclaimed album, The Irish Concertina Two: Teacht Aniar. Around the same time, O'Connor formed a duet with Dublin uilleann piper Seán McKeon, a collaboration that would continue on for many years. In January 2007, O'Connor and McKeon performed in a showcase concert at the Temple Bar TradFest. In a review of the festival by Toner Quinn of The Journal of Music, the concert was described as having "provided the outstanding moment of the festival". In the same review, Quinn remarked of O'Connor's solo performance:

Now only 23 years old, a fiddle solo of three reels half way through the set was, in a word, breathtaking. [...] we teetered with O'Connor on the very edge of the melody as he stretched our concepts of the aesthetics of traditional music – expanding the melody, reducing it, compacting it, going forward, pulling back. This was dangerous music executed in a risky environment, with no accompaniment, no safety net, and there was no cutting short lest he run out of ideas. O'Connor has the potential to have a serious impact on fiddle playing.

O'Connor and McKeon released their debut album Dublin Made Me in January 2009 which was described by Siobhán Long of The Irish Times as "Exceptional musicians who marry technical prowess with a marvellous sense of adventure and history". In 2013, O'Connor was commissioned to record and compose music for inclusion in Stailc 1913, a TG4 documentary film on the 1913 Dublin lock-out.

In April 2017, O'Connor released his debut solo album called The Loom, which received a 5 star review and was voted Trad Album of the Year 2017 by The Irish Times. A review by The Irish Echo described it as a "mind-bogglingly good album full of 'wow' moments from beginning to end". Writing in The Irish Times, Siobhán Long gave it a five-star rating and wrote:

The possibility that we are in a golden age of traditional music, is reinforced by the release of Liam O'Connor's exceptional solo album The Loom. O'Connor has long been a thoughtful, considered fiddle player who wears his acquaintance with the musicians who came before him with equal parts pride and subtlety.

In 2018, O'Connor formed a new duet with concertina player Cormac Begley, as well as performing with McKeon and Hill, and embarking on a tour of the US. He commissioned a new bow from expert bow maker Noel Burke which was part-funded by Music Network Capital Scheme. In September of that year, O'Connor was nominated for the Best Folk Instrumentalist at the RTÉ Radio 1 Folk Awards and in October, he performed at the National Concert Hall, Dublin with John Blake on guitar and Paddy McEvoy on piano.

=== Research ===
In 2006, O'Connor was awarded a bursary from the Arts Council of Ireland under their DEIS scheme where the archiving and recording of the transmission of the tradition from older masters to younger musicians was central. He spent time with and conducted interviews with Seán Potts, Peter Horan, Vincent Harrison, Seamus Tansey, Séamus Begley, John Dwyer, Peadar O'Loughlin, Sean MacIarnán, among others during this project. In 2009, O'Connor secured a first-class honours in a graduate diploma in Irish Folklore at the UCD Delargy Centre for Irish Folklore and the National Folklore Collection. During the course of his studies, O'Connor was awarded two prestigious scholarships: Scoláracht Máire MhicNéill and Scoláracht Dhónaill Uí Mhoráin. O'Connor was awarded a Master of Letters for his research thesis entitled Aspects of oral tradition in the Life and Works of P.W. Joyce.

O'Connor worked as a researcher of traditional songs in the Irish language for the Royal Irish Academy's Doegen Web Records Project. 2018 saw the launch of a project called Re-creating P.W. Joyce: from 19th century manuscripts to an interactive online audio-visual resource, which was conducted in partnership with ITMA in which O'Connor recorded 371 melodies from the Joyce collection and was funded through the Arts Council of Ireland DEIS scheme. Due to his experience in historic collections and contemporary traditional compositions, O'Connor was asked write a foreword to the P.J. Giblin Collection and to Connie O'Connell's Bóithrín na Smaointe.

O'Connor has taught as a guest lecturer on undergraduate and postgraduate courses at the Irish World Academy of Music and Dance, Limerick, and in Dublin Institute of Technology, Dundalk Institute of Technology and University College Dublin. He has also taught and performed at numerous Irish and international music festivals including the Willie Clancy Summer School, Scoil Acla, Tocane. O'Connor has given lectures on P.W. Joyce at Na Píobairí Uilleann, the National Folklore Collection, the Chris Langan Festival, Toronto, and the Willie Clancy Summer School. He has also given talks and lectures on Paddy Cronin, Vincent Harrison, fiddle music in Dublin, and Tommy Potts. In 2012, O'Connor was invited to give an illustrated insight into the music of Tommy Potts at the launch of RTÉ CD Tommy Potts – Traditional Fiddle Music from Dublin.

O'Connor has served as a board member of ITMA and the Gradam Ceoil TG4 Selection Panel, and as honorary secretary of An Cumann le Béaloideas Éireann (The Folklore of Ireland Society). In June 2019, he was appointed director of ITMA.

== Media appearances ==
In March 2013, O'Connor presented episode 4 of the TG4 television program Geantraí from The Ferryman pub in Dublin. On the program, O'Connor performed several reels in front of a live audience, accompanied by guitarist John Blake, as well as a separate performance with his father Mick on flute and siblings Darach on fiddle and Aoife on concertina. The program also featured performances from players such as piper Mick O'Brien and his daughter Aoife on fiddle, flute player Emer Mayock and singer Antaine Ó Farachain. In 2017 O'Connor featured in a short film by Myles O'Reilly about Dublin fiddler Tommy Potts called Tell Us A Bit About Tommy Potts. Filmed at a house session hosted by accordion player Tony MacMahon, O'Connor's father pays tribute to Potts with a few words before O'Connor himself pays homage to the Dublin fiddler by playing a reel in the distinctive style of Potts.

In March 2019, O'Connor made a guest appearance on season 8, episode 1 of the TG4 television documentary series 'Sé Mo Laoch, that featured Dublin fiddler and family friend Seán Keane. In the episode, O'Connor demonstrates some of Keane's technique and style, and talks about his contribution to the tradition of Irish fiddle playing. In June of that year, O'Connor was featured on the RTÉ Radio 1 program, The Rolling Wave hosted by Aoife Nic Cormaic, following the announcement of his appointment as director of the ITMA. The program was later made available as part of The Rolling Wave podcast series (episode 5). On the show, O'Connor chats about growing up in a house full of music and being fascinated by ITMA since he was a teenager, as well as his plans for his upcoming role as director.

== Discography ==
Albums

- Dublin Made Me (with Seán McKeon) (2009)
- The Loom (2017)
- Into the Loam (with Cormac Begley) (2026)

Guest appearances

- The Irish Concertina Two: Teacht Aniar (by Noel Hill) (2005)
- To the City (by Seán McKeon) (2013)

Soundtracks

- Stailc 1913 (2013)

== Awards and nominations ==
=== Gradam Ceoil TG4 ===
Year	Nominee / work	Award	Result
2002	Liam O'Connor	Young Musician of the Year	Won

=== The Irish Times ===
Year	Nominee / work	Award	Result
2017	The Loom	Trad Album of the Year	Won

=== RTÉ Radio 1 Folk Awards ===
Year	Nominee / work	Award	Result
2018	Liam O'Connor	Best Folk Instrumentalist	Nominated
2026	Ryan's Rant	Best Traditional Folk Track	Nominated
