= Aidan Connolly (fiddler) =

Irish fiddler (born 1991)

Aidan Connolly Aodhán Ó Conghaile
- Born: 1991 (age 34–35); Rathfarnham, Dublin, Ireland
- Genres: Folk; Traditional Irish
- Occupations: Musician; teacher
- Instrument: Fiddle
- Years active: 2010s–present
- Label: Raelach Records
- Website: aidanconnollymusic.com
- Parent: Eileen Moynihan (mother)

Aidan Connolly (Irish: Aodhán Ó Conghaile; born 1991) is an Irish fiddler and teacher from Dublin. He has been described by musician Cormac Begley as "one of the best musicians in his generation" and by others as "a leading fiddle player of the current wave of great Irish Traditional music".

== Early life ==
Connolly was born into a musical family in Rathfarnham, Dublin, Ireland. He was originally introduced to traditional Irish music by his mother Eileen, a tin whistle player and native of County Kerry, and his uncle Con Moynihan, a fiddle player. His parents bought him his first fiddle for his 8th birthday and he was enrolled at the Craobh Naithí branch of Comhaltas Ceoltóirí Éireann, which was then based in Ballinteer (now in Knocklyon).

At Craobh Naithí, Connolly had a number of teachers including Brendan Needham, Claire Walsh and Mary O’Halloran. He attended regular pub and house sessions which were organised for the younger players to encourage them to meet and play with other musicians. County Mayo fiddler, Mick Glynn, was a central figure at these events and supported the development of the young musicians. Between the ages of 13 and 17, Connolly took one-to-one lessons with local fiddler, Tomás MacUileagóid, which had a significant impact on his development. MacUileagóid went into great detail on bowing in particular and encouraged Connolly to think more deeply about the style and expression within the music. During those years, Connolly participated in many Fleadh Cheoil competitions in the individual, duet and trio categories, as well as with the Craobh Naithí music groups and Céilí bands.

Outside of music, Connolly graduated with a Bachelor of Education degree from St. Patrick's College in Drumcondra, having studied primary school teaching alongside fellow musician and collaborator, Liam McGonigle.

== Career ==
In 2013, Connolly performed as a duet with McGonigle (on button accordion) at St. Nicholas Collegiate Church, Galway and recorded a track on the Tunes in the Church album, released later that year. In October 2016, Connolly released his debut album, Be Off, with the Raelach Records label. The Journal of Music described it as an "extraordinarily accomplished debut album" and Irish music critic Siobhán Long of The Irish Times described it as a "jaw-droppingly mature debut". Folk Radio UK, who featured the opening track as their tune of the day, described it as a "remarkably accomplished album" and Daniel Neely of The Irish Echo described it "just brilliant". The album features a host of guest musicians including his uncle, Con Moynihan (fiddle), Liam McGonigle (accordion), Deirdre Winrow (fiddle), Pádraic Keane (pipes), Oisín Morrison (flute), Andrea Palandri (fiddle), Pauric Bannon (flute), Ruairí McGorman (bouzouki) and Jack Talty (piano), who also recorded, mixed & mastered the album.

In 2018, Connolly relocated to the Spanish city of Valencia and performs regularly in Spain and Ireland, as well as further afield in countries such as the US, Australia and Japan. In 2019, Aidan collaborated with County Cork fiddler John Daly on an album titled Away On Up The Road. Daniel Neely of The Irish Echo described it as an "outstanding album that will delight fans of traditional music". The album featured an array of rare and not-so-rare tunes from Ireland, supplemented by tunes from the Cape Breton and Shetland traditions. The album was recorded, mixed and mastered by fellow musician, Jack Talty, who also contributed to it with his piano accompaniment.

Connolly has studied traditional Irish music in great depth, specialising in traditional instrumental music from the 1920s to the present. He is particularly interested in archive materials (books, manuscripts, recordings) and has a vast repertoire of tunes of traditional and more contemporary origin, as well as from other folk music genres. Connolly absorbed much of the music of Sliabh Luachra through the playing of his mother. As a fiddle player, Connolly has his own unique style of playing which was heavily influenced by playing with his mother and uncle, as well as his mentor Tomás MacUileagóid. Other influences include a wide variety of fiddlers, including Paddy Cronin, Paddy Canny, Denis Murphy, Bobby Casey, Michael Coleman, James Morrison and Paddy Killoran.

Since 2024, Connolly has performed as John Sheahan in The Dubliners Encore, a stage show celebrating the work of the Irish folk band The Dubliners.

== Media appearances ==
In 2012, Connolly featured on an episode of the TG4 series Geantraí, recorded in Jack Birchall's Pub in Ranelagh, Dublin. In the episode, Connolly plays a set of three reels ('The New Custom House', 'Spoil The Dance' and 'The Master's Return') alongside fellow musicians Niamh MacUilleagóid (harp), Tomás MacUilleagóid (fiddle), and Graham Guerin (button accordion). In August 2019, Connolly performed as a soloist on an episode of the TG4 series TradFest, playing a pair of reels: 'The Teetotaller' and 'The Templehouse'. In April 2020, Connolly performed a fiddle duet with Andrea Palandri as part of the first episode of the TG4 series Slí na mBeaglaoich, recorded in a church in Ardfert, County Kerry. In the episode, the duo perform a set of three reels: 'Tune for Vinny', 'Ballyheigue Castle' and 'The Pigeon on the Gate'.

== Discography ==
Albums

- Be Off (2016)
- Away on Up the Road (with John Daly) (2019)
- The Portland Bow (2021)
- Keane Connolly McGorman (with Pádraic Keane, Fergus McGorman, and Ruairí McGorman) (2023)
- The Groves of Gneeveguilla (with Bryan O'Leary) (2025)

Guest appearances

- Tunes in the Church (with Liam McGonigle) (2013)
