= Erdan =

Erdan may refer to:

- Gilad Erdan (born 1970), Israeli politician
- Erdan Island, Lieyu Township, Kinmen County, Taiwan
- Erdan, Iran, a village in Yazd Province, Iran

== See also ==
- Ardan (disambiguation)
