= List of TG4 Young Traditional Musician of the Year recipients =

List of award winning Musicians

The TG4 Young Traditional Musician of the Year Award is given annually as part of Gradam Ceoil TG4. The award is to recognise the role of young and developing musicians in traditional Irish music and to ensure the future of traditions.

The following is a list of the recipients of the award.

- 1998 – June Nic Cormaic, County Sligo
- 1999 – Aogán Ó Loingsigh, Cork
- 2000 – Méabh O'Hare, Belfast
- 2001 – Conor McKeon (musician), Dublin
- 2002 – Liam O'Connor, Dublin
- 2003 – Ciarán Ó Maonaigh, Donegal
- 2004 – Edel Fox, County Clare
- 2005 – Seán McKeon, Dublin
- 2006 – Michelle Mulcahy, County Limerick
- 2007 – Fiachna Ó Mongáin, County Mayo
- 2008 – Martin Tourish, County Donegal
- 2009 – Conor McEvoy, County Meath
- 2010 – Aidan O'Donnell, County Donegal
- 2011 – Pádraic Keane, County Galway
- 2012 – Caoimhín Ó Fearghail, County Waterford
- 2013 – Dónal McCague, County Monaghan
- 2014 – Bryan O'Leary, County Kerry
- 2015 – Maitiú Ó Casaide, Dublin
- 2016 – Órlaith McAuliffe, London
- 2017 – Liam O'Brien, County Clare
- 2018 – Clare Friel, County Donegal
- 2019 – Conor Connolly, County Galway
- 2020 – Sharon Howley, County Clare
- 2021 – Sorcha Costello, County Clare
- 2022 – Diarmuid Ó Meachair, County Cork
