= Dale Crider =

American troubadour and biologist

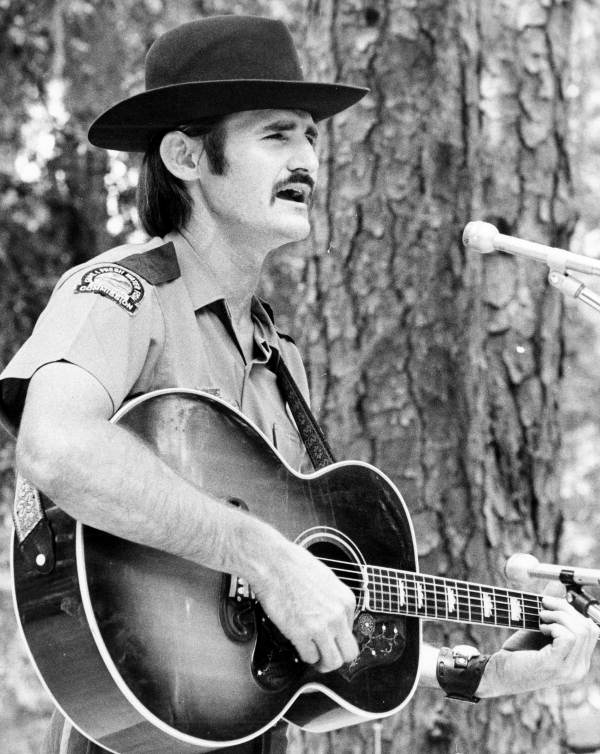
Dale Crider at the Florida Folklife Festival in 1972

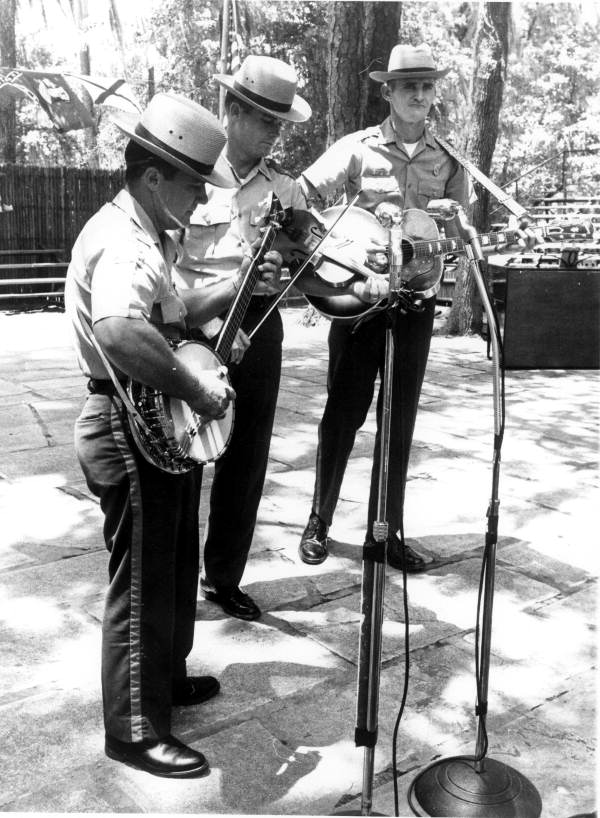
Dale Crider (right) performing with the Florida Wildlife Boys, 1960s

Dale Crider (born c. 1940) is a troubadour and former Florida Fish and Wildlife Conservation Commission biologist. He performed at the Florida Folklife Festival for several decades. He performed traditional bluegrass songs and in later years his original compositions. He sings about environmental themes.

He lives in Alachua County. He married Mary Virginia Cole. They divorced and he remarried with Linda Bittner, who was also his musical partner for several albums. He has six children, three from each marriage.

His song "Apalachicola Doin' Time" features in the similarly named documentary.
