= Feothanach =

Village and townland in County Kerry, Ireland

- Townland
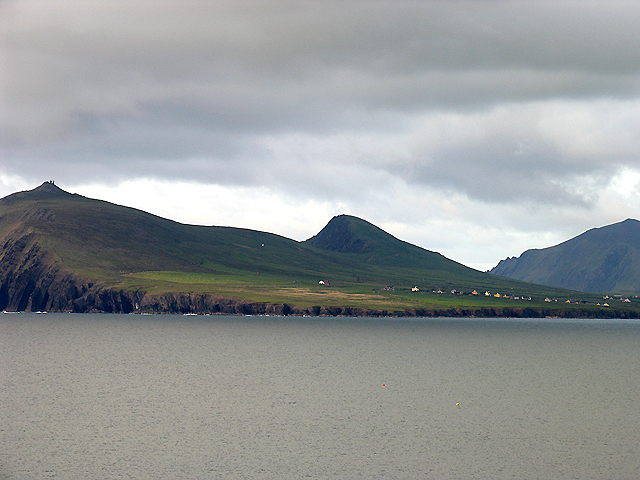
- Coastline between Ballydavid and Feohanagh townlands

- Location in Ireland
- Coordinates: 52°12′31″N 10°20′53″W
- Country: Ireland
- Province: Munster
- County: County Kerry

Population (2001)
  - Urban: 32
  - Rural: 154
- Time zone: UTC+0 (WET)
  - Summer (DST): UTC-1 (IST (WEST))
- Irish Grid Reference: Q387092

Feothanach or an Fheothanach (formerly anglicised as Feohanagh) is a small village and townland in the Corca Dhuibhne Gaeltacht, located 13 km (8.1 mi) north-west of Dingle on the Dingle Peninsula in County Kerry, Ireland. It is at the foot of Mount Brandon.

RTÉ newsreader Siún Nic Gearailt is from the area as well as RTÉ's and TG4's Dáithí Ó Sé.

Local amenities include An Cúinne Pub, Dingle's Coláiste Gaeilge, and a local RTÉ Raidió na Gaeltachta studio.

There is an Irish College in the village operated by the Coláistí Chorca Dhuibhne in the summer months. Students attend classes in the local primary school and activities are held in the local community hall in the village.
