= Páidí Ó Lionáird =

Irish television presenter and columnist

- Born: Pádraig Ó Lionáird; 1968 or 1969 (age 56–57); Cúil Aodha, County Cork, Ireland
- Education: B.Ed, MA Irish Media, Dip. RE.
- Occupation: TV presenter
- Notable credit(s): 7 Lá; Ardán; Gradam Ceoil TG4

Páidí Ó Lionáird (born 1968 or 1969) is an Irish television presenter and columnist from Cúil Aodha, County Cork. Since 1997, Ó Lionáird has been the presenter of current affairs and entertainment shows on the Irish language channel TG4.

== Early life ==
Páidí Ó Lionáird was born in Gort na Scairte, Baile Bhúirne in Cúil Aodha, part of the Muskerry Gaeltacht (Irish-speaking) area of County Cork. The youngest of twelve siblings, his father was the principal of a local secondary school and owned a small holding of land. His older brothers include Iarla Ó Lionáird, a singer and producer, Seán, judge on TG4's Feirm Factor, and Peadar, co-owner of Folláin, which is a jam and chutney manufacturer.

After leaving school, he initially studied Furniture Technology and Design at Dundalk Institute of Technology, before working as a carpenter in London. He had a number of jobs in London, before returning to Ireland. Shortly after his return, he was appointed as development officer for Munster with the Irish-language youth organisation Ógras. He met his wife Karen in May 1990 at the AGM of Conradh na Gaeilge. Together they have one son and live in South Connemara, County Galway.

After studying public relations at University College Cork, Ó Lionáird then qualified as a primary school teacher at Mary Immaculate College (MIC), Limerick. He also holds a master's degree in Irish Media Studies from MIC and UL. He has taught communications at ATU (GMIT) and DCU.

== Career ==
Ó Lionáird's television career began with a screen test for TG4 in 1997. He had roles on a number of different shows, from the light-hearted Ardán to the hard-news political and current affairs show 7 Lá. He was co-commentator on TG4's Tour de France coverage alongside former Irish professional cyclist, Pádraic Quinn (Velotec) from 2004. He also presented Gradam Ceoil TG4, TG4's annual traditional music awards programme.

Ó Lionáird chaired the Irish language debate held between the seven candidates in the 2011 Irish presidential election on 18 October 2011.

He joined the RTÉ newsroom based in Baile na hAbhann where, as of 2019, he was chief sub-editor, Nuacht RTÉ and TG4. He initiated and presented 7Lá on TG4 from 2003 until 2019 and anchored two lengthy general election programmes in 2016 and 2020.

In June 2022, Ó Lionáird was reported to be leaving RTÉ to join the Office of the Irish Language Commissioner (Coimisinéir Teanga). As of 2023, he held the role of communications manager with that organisation.
