= Ó Lionáird =

Ó Lionáird is a surname. Notable people with the surname include:

- Ciarán Ó Lionáird (1988–2026), Irish runner
- Iarla Ó Lionáird (born 1963/1964), Irish singer and record producer
- Páidí Ó Lionáird, Irish television presenter

== See also ==
- Leonard, English surname and given name
