= Eimear Ní Chonaola =

Irish journalist and TV presenter (born 1977)

- Born: 1977 (age 48–49); Spiddal, County Galway, Ireland
- Education: B.A., 1997; Higher Diploma in Applied Communication, 1998
- Alma mater: NUI Galway
- Occupation: TV presenter
- Notable credit(s): Nuacht TG4; Nuacht RTÉ

Eimear Ní Chonaola (Irish pronunciation: [ˈɪmʲəɾˠ n̠ʲiː xɔˈn̪ˠiːl̪ˠə]; born 1977) is an Irish journalist and television presenter from Spiddal, County Galway. Since 2006, Ní Chonaola has been the news anchor on TG4's main evening news broadcast Nuacht TG4 and Nuacht RTÉ.

== Life ==
=== Early life ===
Ní Chonaola was born in an Síán in the Gaeltacht town of Spiddal. A native Irish speaker, she graduated from NUI Galway with a B.A. in 1997 and a Higher Diploma in Applied Communication in 1998.

=== Journalistic career ===
Ní Chonaola was part of the Nuacht TG4 team from the beginning, joining the newsroom as a journalist in October 2000. In 2001, she began presenting for the first time, beginning with the shorter weekend bulletins.

She took over as main anchor from Siún Nic Gearailt on 25 September 2006.

Ní Chonaola chaired the first ever election debate in Irish on 16 February 2011, when she hosted one of the official debates of the 2011 Irish general election. The high-profile debate not only brought greater exposure, but her performance as chairperson of the three-way discussion between Enda Kenny, Eamon Gilmore and Micheál Martin was widely credited in the national press.

The debate was a big ratings win for TG4, with around 600,000 people watching live. Eimear Ní Chonaola took home three Oireachtas Awards as a result.

=== Irish language support ===
Ní Chonaola appeared on The Late Late Show on 4 March 2011, along with Coman Goggins and Róisín Ní Chúaláin to promote Seachtain na Gaeilge.

As part of Seachtain na Gaeilge 2012, she launched a business initiative along with Gaillimh le Gaeilge.

=== Personal life ===
Ní Chonaola has a son, Cuan.
