= Ardun =

Ardun can refer to:

== Places in Iran ==
"Ardun" (Persian: اردون) may refer to:

- Ardun, Isfahan
- Ardun, Yazd

== Other uses ==
- Ardun Mechanical Corporation, Zora Arkus-Duntov's engineering company
