= Tommie Potts =

- Portrait drawing of Potts

Background information
- Born: 24 October 1912; The Liberties, Dublin, Ireland
- Died: 19 March 1988 (aged 75) Balfe Road, Walkinstown, Dublin
- Genres: Traditional Irish
- Occupations: firefighter; fiddle player; composer
- Instrument: Fiddle
- Years active: 1930s–1980s
- Label: Claddagh Records
- Parents: John Potts; Honoria Potts

Tommie Potts (24 October 1912 – 19 March 1988) was an Irish fiddle player and composer from Dublin who gained iconic status in traditional Irish music circles for his virtuoso musicianship. His music has influences from jazz and classical music, including jazz pianist and composer Thelonious Monk, making it a highly individualistic take on the Irish music tradition.

Only one commercial recording of his playing, The Liffey Banks, (Claddagh Records, 1972, credited as "Tommy Potts") was made during his lifetime. In 2012, Tommie Potts – Traditional Fiddle Music from Dublin (Raidió Teilifís Éireann, 2012) was released. The album was compiled and produced by fiddle player Paddy Glackin and consisted of digitally re-mastered tapes held by the RTÉ Sound Archives. Recordings were sourced from three collections: tapes made by Potts for flute and fiddle-player Peadar O’Loughlin in 1962–3; studio and outside broadcast recordings made by producer Tony MacMahon in 1975 and 1977 for his RTÉ Radio programme The Long Note; and tapes made by Potts in c. 1982 that are in the possession of his nephew and former Chieftains whistle player Seán Potts.

Although Potts never received formal training, he was able to read and write music, giving his works structure and purposeful variation, rather than simply inventing them as he went along. One of the most notable aspects of Potts's style is the treatment of traditional Irish music as a creative art form rather than as music for dancing. This is particularly evident in his version of the hop jig "Top it Off", in which he deliberately adds occasional extra beats and slight pauses between phrases, taking away the rhythm needed for dance. The addition of occasional extra beats can also be found in the Donegal fiddle tradition, though it is rare, for instance in the playing of John Doherty.

Potts was a firefighter with Dublin Corporation. Based at Tara Street fire station, he was injured in the Pearse Street fire of October 6, 1936, during which three firefighters died. He was an uncle of the tin whistle player Seán Potts.

== Legacy ==
Despite his controversial approach, Potts is today acknowledged as a figure of vital importance to the evolution of Irish folk music. Many classical and folk music performers acknowledge him as an influence on their music, including Aoife Ní Bhriain, Martin Hayes, Liam O'Connor, Danú, Frankie Gavin, and Paddy Glackin. Potts was the subject of a 2009 TG4 documentary, Tommy Potts - Cérbh É?, in which a series of major figures in contemporary traditional music trace his life and pay homage to Potts and his mastery of their craft. Potts died at his home in Balfe Road, Walkinstown, Dublin on March 19, 1988.

== Discography ==
- The Liffey Banks (1972)
- Tommie Potts - Traditional Fiddle Music from Dublin (2012)

With various artists

- The Gathering (1981), Greenhays Recordings, Paul Brady, Peter Browne, Andy Irvine, Dónal Lunny, Matt Molloy, Tríona Ní Dhomhnaill (Potts plays on two tracks)
