= Ardan =

Ardan may refer to:

== Places ==
- Ardan, a name of the eastern part of the Caucasus region

Iran

- Ardan, Iran, a city in Semnan Province, Iran
- Ardan, Yazd, a village in Yazd Province, Iran

Ireland

- Ardan, County Offaly (Irish: An tArdán), a townland in the civil parish of Kilbride, barony of Ballycowan
- Ardan, County Westmeath, a townland in the civil parish of Rahugh, barony of Moycashel

Romania

- Ardan, a village in Şieu Commune, Bistriţa-Năsăud County, Romania

== Other ==
- Ardan (horse), French Thoroughbred racehorse
- Ardán, an Irish chat show
- Ardan, a character in the Vampire The Masquerade: Redemption video game, Tremere vampire and owner of the Ardan's Chantry
- Ardan, a character in the game Vainglory
