= Mulqueen =

Mulqueen is a surname of Irish language origin. In Irish, it may be written both Ó Maolchaoin, meaning "descendant of Maolchaoin" (a personal name meaning "gentle chief"), and Ó Maolchaoine, meaning "descendant of a devotee of St. Caoine". The latter from can also be anglicised "Mulqueeny". Ó Maolchaoin appears to be the older form of the name.

== List of people surnamed Mulqueen ==
- Ann Mulqueen, Irish singer
- Elaine Mulqueen (1932–2012), American television personality
- Madeline Mulqueen (born 1990), Irish model and actress
- Tim Mulqueen (born 1965), American association football player and coach
