= Nuacht TG4 =

Irish news programme

- Presented by: Siún Nic Gearailt; Eimear Ní Chonaola
- Country of origin: Ireland
- Original language: Irish

Production
- Production locations: Baile na hAbhann, Galway
- Camera setup: Multi-camera
- Running time: 30 minutes

Original release
- Network: TG4

Related
- Nuacht RTÉ; RTÉ News; Virgin Media News

Nuacht TG4 (TG4 News; pronounced [ˈn̪ˠuəxt̪ˠ ˌtʲeːɟeː ˈcahəɾʲ]) is an Irish television news programme on TG4. It is broadcast weekday evenings at 7pm, live from the broadcaster's studios in Baile na hAbhann, County Galway. A shortened edition of the programme is broadcast on weekend evenings at around 6:45pm.

== Format and presenters ==
The programme is anchored by Siún Nic Gearailt and Eimear Ní Chonaola with Eibhlín Ní Choistealbha, Maolra Mac Donnchadha, Aodhán Ó Maoileoin, Máire T. Ní Mhadaoin, and Ruairí Mac Con Iomaire occasionally substituting.

Nuacht TG4 also broadcasts a weekly programme called Timpeall na Tíre, which is a review of the week's top stories from Nuacht TG4.

TG4 provides an overnight international news service in the form of a simulcast of the English-language version of French public news station France 24.

Nuacht TG4 programme has an average viewership of 35,000–40,000.

Since 2010, Nóiméad Nuachta (News Minute) has broadcast each week day at 1:55pm.

== History ==
Nuacht TnaG initially was broadcast at 22:00 each night, later moving to 20:00 and finally to 19:00 where it currently remains. From 1996 to 1998 Gillian Ní Chealllaigh, and Gráinne Seoige were the main news anchors for the channel, with Róisín O'Hara joining in 1997, and Ailbhe Ó Monacháin in 1998. In 1998 Seoige moved to TV3 to launch their main evening news where she remained until 2004, and Ní Cheallaigh left the programme. In 1999, Siún Nic Gearailt joined as an anchor. With the rebranding of TnaG as TG4 the news service also renamed as Nuacht TG4. In 2001, Maolra Mac Donnchadha became an anchor. In 2004, Eimear Ní Chonaola took over from Nic Gearailt.
