= Inverin =

Village in Connemara, Ireland

Inverin Indreabhán
- Village
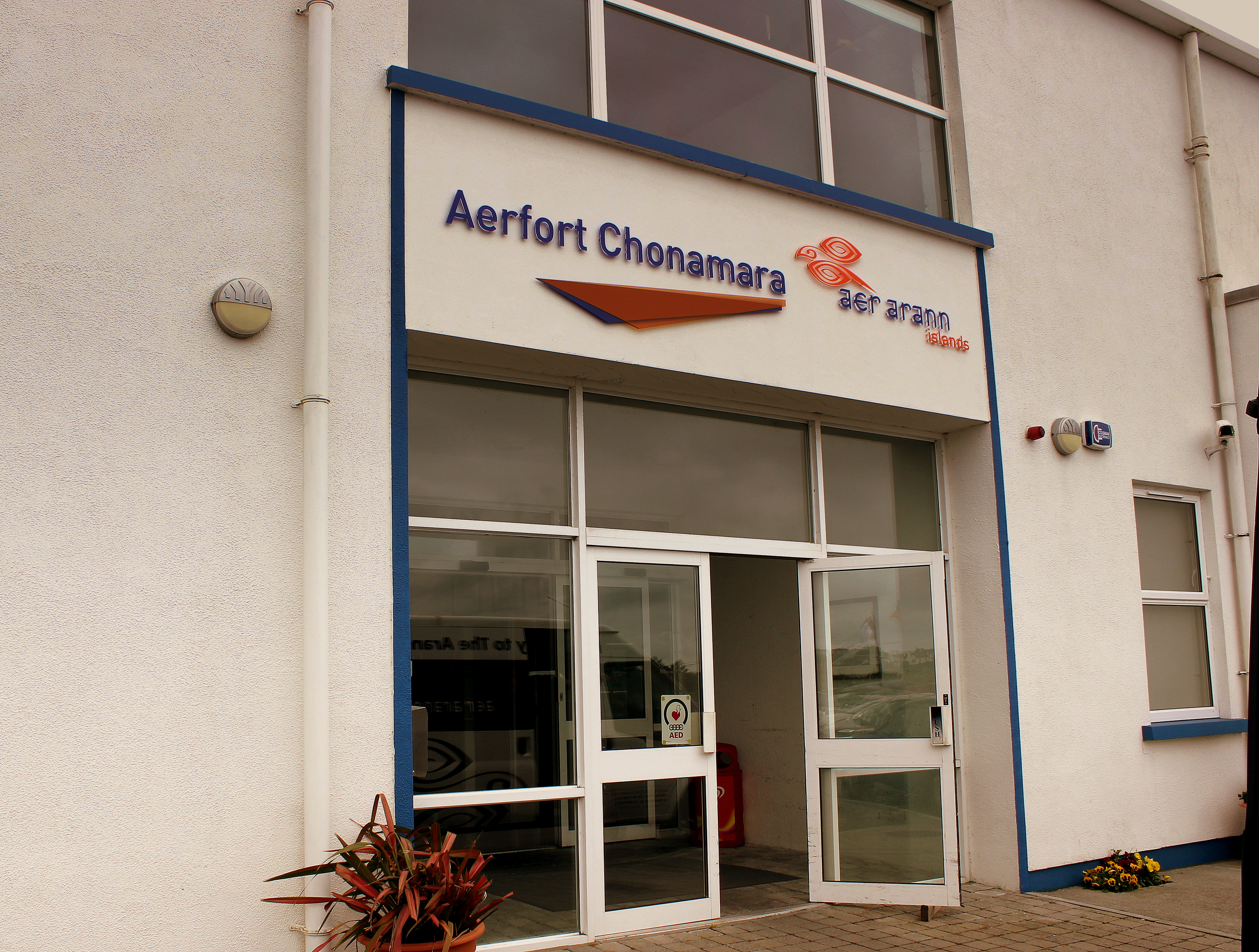
- Inverin Airport in 2013

- Location in Ireland
- Coordinates: 53°14′00″N 9°26′00″W
- Country: Ireland
- Province: Connacht
- County: County Galway
- Irish Grid Reference: M043212

Indreabhán (English: Inverin), meaning "mouth of the river" is a Gaeltacht village between Baile na hAbhann and Minna in County Galway, Ireland. There are Irish-language summer colleges in the area, most notably Coláiste Lurgan and Coláiste Uí Chadhain.

The village is on the R336 road and is served by the 424 Bus Éireann route from Galway.

Cumann Forbartha Chois Fharraige is a local development association founded in 1966. The Gaelic Athletic Association club, Cumann Lúthchleas Gael Mhícheál Breathnach, holds a Gaelic football tournament every year on Saint Stephen's Day. An Irish language book club in the village, Club Leabhar Chois Fharraige, meets monthly.

The airline Aer Arann Islands is headquartered at Connemara Airport near the village.

== People ==
- Calum Maclean, folklorist employed by the Irish Folklore Commission
- Aoife Ní Thuairisg, presenter
- Seán Ó Coisdealbha, poet and dramatist
- Micheál Ó Conghaile (b.1962), important figure to Modern literature in Irish and found of the influential Cló Iar-Chonnacht publishing house
- Fiontán Ó Curraoin, Gaelic footballer
- Pádraig Ó Finneadha, Irish scholar and doctor
- Dónall Ó Héalai, actor
- Pádraic Ó Neachtain, presenter and director

== See also ==
- List of populated places in the Republic of Ireland
- Cló Iar-Chonnacht
