= Brian Rooney =

Brian Rooney may refer to:

- Brian Rooney (actor) (born 1972), Australian actor
- Brian Charles Rooney, American actor and singer
- Brian L. Rooney (born 1970), American murderer
- Brian Rooney (journalist), American television news correspondent, son of Andy Rooney
- Brian Rooney, Iraq war veteran and candidate in the United States House of Representatives elections in Michigan, 2010

== See also ==
- Rooney (surname)
