= List of TG4 Lifetime Achievement Award recipients =

List of award

The TG4 Lifetime Achievement Award is given annually as part of Gradam Ceoil TG4. The award is to recognise a musician who has had a profound effect on the traditional Irish music world and promoted traditional music in a positive way.

The following is a list of the recipients of the award.

- 2001 – Paddy Canny, Co. Clare
- 2002 – Peter Horan, Co. Sligo
- 2003 – Johnny O'Leary, Co. Kerry
- 2004 – Tony MacMahon, Co. Clare
- 2005 – Peadar Ó Lochlainn, Co. Clare
- 2006 – Sarah Keane and Rita Keane, Co. Galway
- 2007 – Paddy Cronin, Co. Kerry
- 2008 – Joe O'Donovan and Siobhán O'Donovan, Co. Cork
- 2009 – Roger Sherlock, Co. Mayo
- 2010 – Seán Potts, Dublin
- 2011 – Ben Lennon, Co. Leitrim
- 2012 – Danny Meehan, Co. Donegal
- 2013 – Michael Tubridy, Co. Clare
- 2014 – Chris Droney, Co. Clare
- 2015 – Bobby Gardiner, Co. an Chláir
- 2016 – Arty McGlynn, Co. Tír Eoghan
- 2017 – Dónal Lunny, Co. Offaly
- 2018 – Patsy Hanly, Co. Roscommon
- 2019 – Nicky McAuliffe and Anne McAuliffe, Co. Kerry
- 2020 – Séamus Connolly, Massachusetts
- 2021 – Seán Ó Sé, Co. Cork
- 2022 – Dolores Keane, Co. Galway
