= Glór Tíre =

- Presented by: Aoife Ní Thuairisg
- Country of origin: Ireland
- Original languages: English; Irish
- No. of seasons: 18

Production
- Running time: 40mins * 12 and 60mins * 3
- Production company: Gaelmedia

Original release
- Network: TG4
- Release: 2002-present

Glór Tíre ([ɡlˠoːɾˠ ˈtʲiːɾʲə], "voice of the country") is a reality-based talent search for Ireland's newest country and western music star. It has been running for a number of seasons on TG4, the Irish public service broadcaster for Irish-language speakers. It is produced by Gaelmedia for TG4. It is one of TG4's top rated programmes often coming first in the channels top 10 programmes, averaging 100,000 viewers.

== Format ==
It is Ireland's only TV talent quest for country and western talent. It is presented by Aoife Ní Thuairisg. She talks to the contestants after they perform to get their reactions to the comments of studio judges.

Each series typically comprises 15 episodes. The opening episode introduces each of the artists to the audience, allowing them to sing a song for the judges and the audience. Over a span of nine concert programmes recorded as live, the contestants take their place beside their mentor over the course of one concert each. Each contestant performs a duet and a solo with their mentor within their concert programme. This is followed by a review edition recapping performances. Three elimination programmes follow with each session resulting in elimination of two contestants per week. The judging panel can save one of the three contestants with the lowest vote but the public vote is hugely important too. The grand final features three contestants and the winner is decided by public vote.

== Winners ==
- Season 1 (2003):
- Season 2 (2004): Patrick Connolly
- Season 4 (2006): Mark Prouse
- Season 5 (2009): Patrick O'Sullivan
- Season 6 (2010): Eunice Moran
- Season 7 (2011): Nicky Kealey
- Season 8 (2012):
- Season 9 (2013): Michael Regan
- Season 10 (2014): Michael Collins
- Season 11 (2015): Liam Kelly
- Season 12 (2016): Gavin McAloon
- Season 13 (2017): Lauren McCrory
- Season 14 (2018): Gary Fitzpatrick
- Season 15 (2019): John Rafferty
- Season 16 (2020): Paschal McAnenly
- Season 17 (2021): Emma Donohue
- Season 18 (2022): Aishling Rafferty
- Season 19 (2023): Seán Fahy
- Season 20 (2024): Jason McCahill
- Season 21 (2025): Paddy Treacy
- Season 22 (2026): Jordan McPolin
