= Saol faoi Shráid =

- Also known as: Life Under the Street
- Genre: Children's television series
- Created by: Darach Ó Tuairisg; Micheál Ó Domhnaill
- Written by: Patricia Forde
- Directed by: Deirdre Ní Fhlatharta
- Country of origin: Ireland
- Original language: Irish
- No. of episodes: 26

Production
- Executive producer: Darach Ó Tuairisg
- Producer: Micheál Ó Domhnaill
- Running time: 12 minutes
- Production company: Meangadh Fíbín

Original release
- Network: TG4
- Release: 27 October 2014 – present

Saol faoi Shráid (Life Under the Street) is an Irish language live-action puppet television series aimed at three to six-year-olds. The series first aired in October and November 2014 on the TG4 network.

The series follows the adventures of Glibín and Ribín, two "alien" croílín siblings who live in the centre of the earth. When their tunnelling machine breaks down just underneath a residential street, they befriend a trio of insects—Cicí, Rocco and Dris—who have formed a rock band.

A picture book based on the series, Saol faoi Shráid: An Giotár Nua (The New Guitar) by Patricia Forde and Kevin O'Boyle was published by Cló Iar-Chonnacht in August 2015.
