= Teilifís na Gaeilge (corporation) =

Corporation that runs TG4

- Type: Statutory corporation
- Industry: Broadcasting
- Founded: 1 April 2007
- Headquarters: Baile na hAbhann, County Galway, Ireland
- Key people: Anna Ní Ghallachair, Cathaoirleach (Chair), Deirdre Ní Choistín, Ardstiúrthóir (Director-General)
- Products: Television
- Revenue: €53,532,000 (2003) (including commercial income and exchequer funding)
- Number of employees: 121 (2023)
- Website: www.tg4.ie

Teilifís na Gaeilge is the corporation in charge of operating the Irish language television channels TG4 and Cúla4; the corporation is a public service broadcaster.

The corporation was created on 1 April 2007 in order to independently manage the TG4 television station which had up to this point been managed by Raidió Teilifís Éireann since 1996 when broadcasting operations commenced. The television station was originally called Teilifís na Gaeilge (TnaG); but in 1999, it was rebranded as TG4.

The Broadcasting Act 2009 sets out the details of the law that applies to the corporation, including the duties and functions of the board, as well as that of the chairperson of the board and the director general.
