= Seán McKiernan =

Irish traditional musician

- Occupation: Traditional musician

Seán McKiernan is an Irish traditional musician of Carna, County Galway who plays the uilleann pipes. He was named TG4 Traditional Musician of the Year at the Gradam Ceoil of 2010. He came from an Irish speaking family of Boston, but has lived in Ireland since 1965.
