= Siún Nic Gearailt =

Irish newsreader

- Born: 14 September 1971 (age 54); Feothanach, County Kerry, Ireland
- Education: B.A. Irish and German
- Alma mater: University College Galway
- Occupation: Journalist
- Notable credit(s): Nuacht RTÉ, RTÉ News, Nuacht TG4
- Spouse: Ailbhe Ó Monacháin (m. 2007; div. 2014)

Siún Nic Gearailt (Irish pronunciation: [ˈʃuːn̪ˠ n̠ʲɪc ˈɟaɾˠəl̠ʲtʲ]; born 14 September 1971) is a newsreader with RTÉ and Teilifís na Gaeilge (TG4) in Ireland.

She currently presents Nuacht RTÉ and Nuacht TG4 and has presented many of RTÉ's English news programmes, including the Six One News, Nine O'Clock News and the News on Two. She has also read the news and English bulletins on RTÉ Radio.

== Early life and education ==
A native Irish speaker, Nic Gearailt was raised in the Feothanach Gaeltacht region of western County Kerry. Her family ran a pub named An Cúinne.

She lived in Germany for some years and speaks fluent German. She worked for the film production company Concorde Anois and was an trainee assistant director on the Roger Corman-produced The Unspeakable (1996). She made a cameo appearance in the successful Irish sitcom CU Burn.

Nic Gearailt studied Irish and German at University College Galway (UCG).

== Career ==
Following her graduation from UCG in 1995, Nic Gearailt began her broadcasting career with local radio station Clare FM where she worked as researcher and reporter. She also worked on a freelance basis for RTÉ Raidió na Gaeltachta.

With the inception of TnaG in 1996, Nic Gearailt was among the first group of journalists to work for the new Irish language television station. The Kerry native reported extensively throughout the west of Ireland and further afield, covering (the aftermath of) the Omagh bombing, reporting from Frankfurt and Berlin prior to the introduction of the new European currency, the euro, and on the work of Irish missionary priests and nuns from Nigeria. She co-presented the Inauguration of Mary McAleese as the 8th President of Ireland from Dublin Castle with fellow broadcaster Tomás Ó Ceallaigh for the station.

In 2003, she was asked by RTÉ to present a bilingual current affairs programme - Seachtain - a weekly on-location broadcast focusing on regional issues. Shortly afterwards she was appointed Anchor of Nuacht RTÉ. She continued to present Seachtain for a number of years.

In 2006, she began to present various other radio and television news bulletins for the national broadcaster and has presented all the main news bulletins including Six One, News on Two and Nine O'Clock since then.

More recently, she presented a special live tribute to the writer and musician Maidhc Dainín Ó Sé following his death in 2013. In 2015 Nic Gearailt presented Nuacht RTÉ from Westminster during the British General Election. In the lead-up to the 2016 Irish General Election, she presented live outside broadcasts from Galway, Kerry and Taoiseach Enda Kenny's constituency of Mayo for Nuacht RTÉ.

== Other work ==
Nic Gearailt held off the challenge from Mícheál Ó Muircheartaigh, RTÉ's Mr GAA, to win the inaugural RTÉ Personalities' GAA Prediction League title. Nic Gearailt has also been voted Kerry Woman of the Year by RSVP readers and was voted as one of the RTÉ Guide's Top 5 most liked presenters.

She acts as MC at charity and cultural events from time to time.

== Personal life ==
Nic Gearailt married her fellow news presenter Ailbhe Ó Monacháin (from Gaoth Dobhair, County Donegal, in Ulster) in December 2007. They separated in 2014.
