= Áine Hensey =

Radio broadcaster and producer

- Born: Dublin
- Education: Maynooth University (PhD)
- Known for: Traditional Irish music

Áine Hensey is a radio broadcaster and producer of Irish music programmes, as well as an Irish historian.

== Biography ==
Áine Hensey was born in Blackrock, Dublin to Brenden Hensey and Maura Hickey. She is one of five children. Hensey worked in public relations for many years as well as arts administration. She worked for festivals including Slógadh, Éigse Mrs Crotty, Oidhreacht an Chláir, and Consairtín. She is on the selection panel for the Gradam Ceoil TG4 awards. She is the chairman of Gael-Linn.

From the 70s Hensey worked in broadcasting. She started with the national broadcaster RTÉ. She started with Radio 2 and also worked with Radio 1 and Clare FM. In 1995 Hensey moved to Raidió na Gaeltachta. Hensey is the producer of Heather Breeze, the Mist-Covered Mountain, Béal Maidine, An Ghaoth Aniar, the Late Session, and An Ghealach Ghorm as well as sports programmes, current affairs, and history shows. Hensey studied early modern history with Maynooth University and got a PhD in 2012.
