= Pádraig Ó Finneadha =

Irish scholar and doctor (1913–1986)

- Born: 23 January 1913; Lochán Beag, Indreabhán, County Galway
- Died: 18 November 1986 (aged 73)
- Occupations: Scholar and doctor
- Spouse: Bridget Elizabeth Prendergast
- Children: Micheál Feeney

Academic background
- Education: National University of Ireland, Galway

Pádraig Ó Finneadha (23 January 1913 – 18 November 1986) was an Irish scholar and doctor.

Born at Lochán Beag, Indreabhán, County Galway, the youngest of eleven children of Micheál Ó Finneadha and Bríd Ní Fhualáin, he graduated from National University of Ireland, Galway, in 1938. After a period working in the Irish Army Medical Corps, where he reached the rank of Captain, he worked in mission hospitals in Nigeria and Uganda before returning permanently to Ireland in 1961 pursuing a career as a general practitioner. During the 1960s and 1970s he presented an Irish-language programme on Irish radio (Raidió Éireann) entitled Focal ón Dochtúir (A Word from the Doctor) dealing with general health issues for the public. As a student, he collected material from his locality for the Irish Folklore Commission. He was the author of two books on health aimed at the general reader, Sláinteachas agus Garchabhair (1956) and Dochtúireacht Baile (1961).
