= Pioc do Ride =

- Genre: Dating game show
- Presented by: Áine Goggins
- Country of origin: Ireland
- Original language: Irish

Production
- Producer: El Zorrero Films

Original release
- Network: TG4
- Release: 2015

Pioc do Ride is a car-based dating show format broadcast on Irish language broadcaster TG4. A contestant must choose from three dates solely based on their car and its contents.

The show became famous for the cruel twist at the end, where the chosen contestant can either choose to go on a date or take a voucher for a car service worth €250. The moment the contestant chose the voucher over the date in Episode 1, the video clip went viral across Ireland and also featured in news reports across the UK and as far afield as in the USA and China.

The series consists of 13 episodes broadcast on Thursday nights starting in September 2015. Pioc do Ride was commissioned by Proinsias Ní Ghrainne and Laura Ní Cheallaigh and is aimed at the 15-24 age group. It is produced by Dave Clarke and Ciarán Deeney of El Zorrero Films and directed by Dermot O’Hanlon.

Contestants were sourced for the show in part through the dating app Tinder.

== Presenter ==
The show is presented by Áine Goggins from Dublin. Presenting the show has enabled her to fund her studies for a medical degree at Queen's University Belfast. Goggins is from Dublin and previously presented ‘Ó Tholg go Tolg’ also on TG4.

== Critical response ==
Speaking on RTÉ Raidió na Gaeltachta Bláthnaid Ni Chofaigh has criticised the show calling it "tacky". Ray Foley, a radio presenter on 98fm called Pioc Do Ride the 'best programme on Irish TV ever’. The Irish Times described the show as "perfectly daft". Writing in the Irish Independent Ian O'Doherty called Pioc Do Ride "genuinely bonkers and charming".
