= Aoife Ní Thuairisg =

Irish television presenter

Aoife Ní Thuairisg is an Irish language presenter on TG4, Ireland's national Irish-language television station. Aoife co-hosted TG4's 2015 Gradam Ceoil traditional Irish music awards show.

Ní Thuairisg was born in Inverin in Conamara and has two brothers and one sister. Before working in television, she ran her own business. She started working as a presenter on TG4 in 1997, and now presents the weather and is also a continuity announcer. She has presented various programmes in the past, including Glór Tíre, the popular country music show, and the Féilte series, as well as live coverage of the Wimbledon Championships. She has also produced several programmes herself.

She produced several episodes of the successful series Paisean Faisean. However, she became involved in controversy when she refused to present a show featuring gay men, as she is a Jehovah's Witness.
