= List of TG4 Special Contribution Award recipients =

List of award

The TG4 Lifetime Achievement Award is given annually as part of Gradam Ceoil TG4. The award is to recognise people or organisations who have worked to ensure the preservation and development of traditional Irish music.

The following is a list of the recipients of the award.

- 2006 – Proinsias Ó Conluain, Co. Tyrone
- 2007 – Ciarán Mac Mathúna, Limerick
- 2008 – Harry Bradshaw, Co. Wicklow
- 2009 – Reg Hall, Kent, England
- 2010 – Muiris Ó Rócháin, Co. Kerry
- 2011 – Micheál Ó Súilleabháin, Co. Tipperary
- 2012 – Eithne agus Brian Vallely, Co. Armagh
- 2013 – Na Píobairí Uilleann
- 2014 – Mick Moloney, Co. Limerick
- 2015 – Taisce Cheol Dúchais Éireann
- 2016 – Cairde na Cruite
- 2017 – Mick O'Connor, Co. Dublin
- 2018 – Pádraigín Ní Uallacháin, Co. Armagh
- 2019 – Brendan Mulkere, Co. Clare
- 2020 – Ned Kelly, Co. Tipperary
- 2021 – The Glengormley School of Traditional Music, Co. Antrim
- 2022 – Edwina Guckian, Co. Leitrim
