= Seán Ó Coisdealbha =

Irish poet, dramatist and actor

Seán Ó Coistealbha (1930–2006) was an Irish poet and dramatist.

Ó Coistealbha was born in Inverin, Connemara, where he was more commonly known as Johnny Chóil Mhaidhc. He played the lead role in An Dochtúir Bréige and went on to win a gold medal for acting with Taidhbhearc na Gaillimhe. Fascinated by the theatre, he took to writing comic dramas. Most of his plays, in which he usually played the leading character, are based on folk themes and stock situations.

== Select bibliography ==
- An Tincéara Buí, 1962
- Pionta Amháin Uisce, 1978
- Buille Faoi Thuairim Gabha, 1987
