= Nuacht RTÉ =

- Also known as: Nuacht RTÉ le TG4
- Presented by: Siún Nic Gearailt; Eimear Ní Chonaola
- Country of origin: Ireland
- Original language: Irish

Production
- Production locations: Baile na hAbhann, Galway (since 20 July 2009); Previously Donnybrook, Dublin (headquarters of RTÉ)
- Camera setup: Multi-camera
- Running time: 15 minutes
- Production company: Raidió Teilifís Éireann

Original release
- Network: RTÉ One

Related
- Nuacht TG4, RTÉ News

Nuacht RTÉ (Irish for RTÉ News) is the main news service for Irish speakers on RTÉ television. The service is broadcast from the news studios at Baile na hAbhann in the Connemara Gaeltacht, County Galway, Ireland.

Nuacht RTÉ broadcasts daily at 5:00pm on the RTÉ News channel and at 5:40pm on RTÉ One with a repeat available on rte.ie and the RTÉ Player. The Angelus follows for 1 minute after Nuacht RTÉ at 6:00pm. Nuacht TG4 airs on TG4 weeknights at 7:00pm and weekends at 7:15pm.

The bulletin is presented and researched by a team of 42 staff who are employed in the research and presentation of both Nuacht RTÉ and Nuacht TG4. Three new technical positions have been created as a result of investment by RTÉ.

== Nuacht RTÉ before relocation ==
Previously, Nuacht RTÉ was presented from the RTÉ News studio at the RTÉ headquarters in Donnybrook, Dublin 4. A brief bulletin of the main news headlines aired daily after the RTÉ News: One O'Clock, with the in-vision newsreader on the left of the screen and a scrolling transcript of the Irish text on the right, taken directly from the autocue. The longer 5:20pm programme consisted of the main news stories of the day, with pre-recorded packages from reporters, a brief weather forecast, and a teaser for that evening's Nuacht TG4. It was presented mainly by Siún Nic Gearailt on weekdays, and by Brídóg Ni Bhuachalla on weekends.

In 2009, RTÉ moved its Irish language television news department to Galway, based in the same premises with TG4, although it retained a separate studio and visual identity.

In 2018, arrangements were made between RTÉ and TG4 which saw Nuacht RTÉ rebranded to Nuacht RTÉ le TG4, using TG4's visual identity, broadcasting from a new purpose-built studio in Connemara to be shared with Nuacht TG4. The shared visual identity was dropped in 2026, but Nuacht RTÉ continues to operate from the Connemara studio.

Irish language news bulletins on RTÉ Radio 1, RTÉ 2fm and RTÉ Lyric FM are still presented from RTÉ in Dublin, while those on RTÉ Raidió na Gaeltachta are presented from its headquarters in Casla, Conamara, County Galway.
