= Keane-Connolly-McGorman =

Traditional Irish music quartet

Keane/Connolly/McGorman are a quartet of traditional Irish musicians who are currently active within the traditional music scene. They consist of uilleann piper Pádraic Keane, fiddle player Aidan Connolly, and brothers Fergus McGorman on flute and Ruairí McGorman on Greek bouzouki. Their music is bright, energetic, and highly influenced by past traditional Irish musicians and groups, such as Paddy Cronin, Denis Murphy, De Danann, The Chieftains, and more. In December 2023, they released their self-titled debut album under Raelach Records, with funding from the Arts Council of Ireland.

== Music ==
Pádraic, Aidan, Fergus and Ruairí grew up playing traditional music together and first recorded as a four-piece on Aidan Connolly's album Be Off, with the jigs 'Streams of Kilnaspig/The Lark in the Blue Summer Sky'. Subsequently, they were invited to perform together at the Corofin Traditional Music Festival in March 2020, which marked their first performance together as Keane/Connolly/McGorman.

Their music is heavily influenced by past masters such as Paddy Cronin, Denis Murphy, Patsy Tuohey, etc., and has been described as reminiscent of the well-known musicians and groups of the 1970s-revival era of traditional Irish music, such as The Chieftains. Keane/Connolly/McGorman's eponymous debut album, was released by Raelach Records on 01/12/2023, and was funded by The Arts Council of Ireland. Noreen O'Donoghue makes an appearance on the harp accompaniment, while Jack Talty plays piano. The album was well-received by reviewers, with Irish Music Magazine describing the album as "uncluttered and precise", and as 'a brilliant album that I think everyone should own', by Daniel Neely in The Irish Echo

In January 2025, they received two nominations at the RTÉ Radio 1 Folk Awards for Best Folk Group and Best Folk Album for their eponymous debut album. Keane Connolly McGorman were among the leading nominations that year with two.

== Discography ==
=== Albums ===
- Keane Connolly McGorman (2023 - Raelach Records)
