= Paisean Faisean =

Irish language dating show on TV

- Genre: Dating game show Fashion
- Created by: Clodagh Freeman
- Presented by: Bláthnaid Nic Dhonnchadha (Season 4 – present); Síle Seoige (Season 5 – present); Mairéad Ní Chuaig (Season 4); Aoife Ní Thuairisg (Seasons 1 – 3)
- Country of origin: Ireland
- Original language: Irish
- No. of series: 5

Production
- Producer: Magma Films
- Running time: 25 mins

Original release
- Network: TG4
- Release: 2005

Related
- Cleamhas, Eochair An Ghrá

Paisean Faisean ("Fashion Passion") is an Irish language television dating show broadcast on TG4. It was presented in the first three series by Aoife Ní Thuairisg, and in the fourth series by Bláthnaid Nic Dhonnchadha and Mairéad Ní Chuaig. The fifth series saw Nic Dhonnchadha present alongside Síle Seoige.

== Format ==
Magma films bought the format from Digital Rights Group with the line "Boys buy clothes for girls" from that Clodagh Freeman created the series. Magma films get a percentage of international rights as they bought the format from paper and brought it to the screen first. The format of the show traditionally involves three men choosing outfits for one woman – although the episode aired on 19 November 2007 featured four gay men. The suitors are shown a short pre-recorded clip of the girl, wearing jeans and a white T-shirt, in which she introduces herself and gives clues as to which clothes she likes. Each man shops in a different shop, and has €400 spending money (raised to €500 in the fourth season). The person for whom the outfits are purchased must then base her choice of "date" on which outfit she likes the best. The winning man and the woman then share dinner in a restaurant.

In 2010, Magma Films, producers of Paisean Faisean, sold the rights to Zoo Productions, who proposed to produce the series for MTV under the title Style Date. The show was also produced in Turkey, and a Polish version was also optioned in 2010.

== Controversies ==
=== Advertising ===
In the show's second season it raised some controversy, when complaints were upheld against two of its advertisements by the Advertising Standards Authority of Ireland; a billboard advertisement depicting a woman in slightly revealing clothing led to complaints of 'reducing women to mere sexual objects'; and a radio advertisement in which a woman complains about people being able to see her underwear, with the response 'Not if you're not wearing any, they won't', led to complaints about sexual equality.

=== Gay contestants ===
Series four included an episode with gay couples. Ní Thuairisg refused to film episodes featuring gay couples, claiming "incompatibility with her religious beliefs" (she is a Jehovah's Witness); this may have contributed to her departure.
