= Sean Keane =

Seán Keane may refer to:

- Seán Keane (fiddler) (1946–2023), fiddle player of The Chieftains
- Seán Keane (singer) (born 1961), Irish folk singer; brother of singer Dolores Keane
- Seán Keane (Irish politician) (1899–1953), Irish Labour Party politician represented Cork East

== See also ==
- Keane (disambiguation)
