= 7 Lá =

Television series

- Starring: Páidí Ó Lionáird
- Country of origin: Ireland
- Original language: Irish

Production
- Camera setup: Multi-Camera
- Running time: 30 minutes

Original release
- Network: TG4
- Release: 14 March 2005 – present

7 Lá (Seacht Lá, meaning "seven days") is an Irish-language weekly current affairs show. All topics are discussed but particular focus is given to regional and Gaeltacht affairs.
