= Fíorscéal =

Fíor Scéal is an Irish language documentary series broadcast on Irish language television channel TG4 about aspects of world current affairs and other topics. The series is based on programming funded by SBS in Australia and by a French production company; this series in Ireland has been repackaged for an Irish audience.

The etymology of the name comes from fíor, meaning "true" and scéal meaning "story". The audio is spoken in the Irish language and any applicable native languages, and there are subtitles in English. Among the presenters are Eibhlín Ní Choistealbha, Máire T. Ní Mhadaoin, Maolra Mac Donnchadha, and Alex Hijmans. Programmes typically run for 60 minutes.
