= Murder of Michelle Gardner-Quinn =

Murder of American woman

Michelle Gardner-Quinn
- Born: January 28, 1985
- Disappeared: October 7, 2006 (aged 21); Burlington, Vermont
- Status: Found dead October 13, 2006; Richmond, Vermont
- Cause of death: Murder via strangulation

Michelle Gardner-Quinn (January 28, 1985 – October 2006) was an undergraduate at the University of Vermont who was kidnapped on October 7, 2006. Her body was later found along a road in the neighboring town of Richmond on October 13.

== Disappearance and murder ==
In the early morning hours of October 7, Gardner-Quinn was walking home in Burlington, Vermont, to her campus dormitory after a night out with friends. She borrowed a cell phone from a passerby, Brian Rooney, to call an acquaintance. A jewelry store surveillance camera captured Gardner-Quinn walking east with Rooney at approximately 2:34 am. Six days later, her body was found by hikers near Huntington Gorge in Richmond, Vermont. An autopsy revealed she had been sexually assaulted, beaten and strangled.

== Assailant ==
At a press conference on October 13, police announced that they had found Gardner-Quinn's body and arrested Brian L. Rooney (born June 27, 1970) on separate charges unrelated to the case. Rooney, a construction worker with several prior arrests, was facing charges from neighboring Caledonia County pertaining to sexual assault and lewd conduct with a child. Federal charges were filed against Rooney as of 1998. He had also been charged with lewd and lascivious conduct with a minor in Essex County, about 80 miles (130 km) east of Burlington, and with sexual assault on a minor and on an 18-year-old girl. Rooney is believed to have used an ether-soaked cloth to subdue and incapacitate the 18-year-old. A former girlfriend with whom he had a child has said that he threatened to kill her on numerous occasions. According to court documents, Rooney was believed to have three children with as many mothers.

In addition to being the person who last saw Gardner-Quinn, Rooney was reportedly seen with cuts on his hands when he stopped at a business in Winooski several days later. On October 25, police announced that they had charged Rooney with aggravated homicide in the death of Gardner-Quinn. He pleaded not guilty.

At a press meeting, Rooney's lawyer accidentally revealed confidential information about DNA evidence, which resulted in the trial going under lock-and-key.

On May 22, 2008, Rooney was convicted of aggravated murder by a 12-member jury. Rooney's guilt was based largely on the strength of DNA evidence taken from semen found inside Quinn's body, while his lawyer argued that "two nanograms of sperm" handled by a forensic lab with a history of sloppy work was not sufficient to convict.

=== Sentence and appeal ===
On October 17, 2008, Rooney was sentenced to life imprisonment without the possibility of parole (under Vermont law, the only available sentence for aggravated murder). Judge Michael Kupersmith admonished him, stating that: "You are the lowest of the low." Rooney expressed condolences to Quinn's family but maintained he is innocent.

Rooney's lawyer, David Sleigh, argued that he should be acquitted outright because the State failed to prove that Gardner-Quinn's death occurred at the time of her rape, which is a requirement for the crime of aggravated murder with which he was charged. In February 2011, the Vermont Supreme Court ruled that Rooney's trial was carried out appropriately. As voted in a 3–2 decision, Rooney's sentence of life in prison without parole was affirmed.

As of November 2023, per the Vermont Department of Corrections, Rooney is incarcerated at Southern State Correctional Facility in Springfield, Vermont.

== Aftermath ==
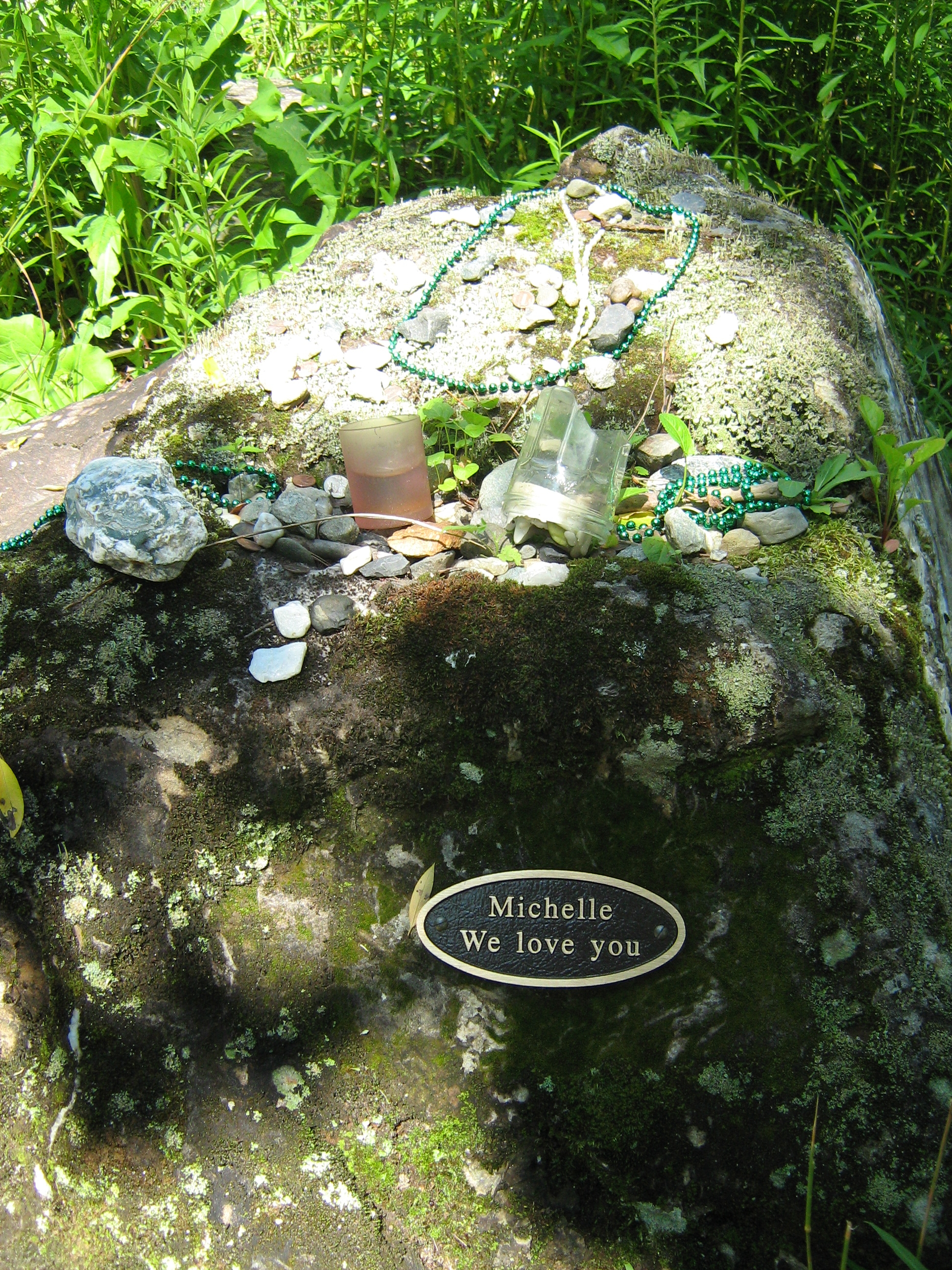
Roadside plaque near where Michelle's body was found. Visitors leave tokens such as beads and flowers on the boulder.

Cosmopolitan magazine featured Gardner-Quinn's story, "The Murder of a Beautiful Girl", in its February 2007 issue.

A non-profit organization, Michelle's Earth Foundation (MEF) has been founded in her memory. It is devoted to promoting youth involvement and awareness in environmentalism, about which Gardner-Quinn cared deeply.

Her parents are creating a scholarship in her name at UVM (WPTZ)

An essay she wrote (just days before her abduction) about her environmental beliefs was featured at Live Earth concerts in July 2007 and on an August 5 National Public Radio broadcast.

Her essay, "A Reverence For All Life", has also been published in the book, This I Believe II: More Personal Philosophies of Remarkable Men and Women.

== See also ==
- List of solved missing person cases (2000s)
