= Ann Mulqueen =

Sean-nós singer and performer

- Born: 1940s Castleconnell
- Known for: Irish traditional music

Ann Mulqueen is an Irish sean-nós singer and performer, popular as a ballad singer in the 1960s.

== Biography ==
Ann Mulqueen was born in Castleconnell, County Limerick in the 1940s. She said her grandmother Bridget Mulqueen of Clare taught her traditional songs. She won the All-Ireland ballad singing competition in 1959, '60 and '61. From the age of 15 Mulqueen was singing with bands including the Gallowglass Céilí Band, The Dubliners and Willie Clancy. She also sing with other traditional singers like Seán 'ac Dhonncha. Mulqueen performed regularly on tours of the US and the UK with Comhaltas Ceoltóirí Éireann.

She is married to Tomás Ó Ceilleachair with whom she had daughters Odí and Sorcha, and a son Ógie. They ran Tig an Cheoil in Ring, County Waterford. With her daughters she recorded an album in 2001.
