= Ardán =

Irish language TV chat show

Ardán is a weekly Irish language chat show produced by RTÉ for TG4. It is presented by Páidí Ó Lionáird and is broadcast on Sundays at 20:30.

== Overview ==
Ardán (pronounced /'ɔrdɔ:n/, and meaning "platform") has been on the TG4 (Irish Language Public Sector Broadcaster) schedule since 2000. Formerly a live studio show, the show is now pre-recorded; thus allowing for English subtitling and possibly extending the broadcaster's target audience.

== Hosts ==
The show was first presented by entrepreneur Páraic Ó Céide (of Aer Arann, Foinse and Clódóirí Lurgan).

The second presenter, after 13 episodes in 2000, was Páidí Ó Lionáird. Originally from County Cork (but now residing in Galway) Ó Lionáird began with the fledgling TG4 in 1997 on a similar studio-based chat show: Seó Bóthair. He is educated to master's degree level having studied Media At Mary I & UL. He also holds an Honours Degree in Education, holds Diplomas in both Religious Studies and Public Relations, is a member of the Irish Academy of Public Relations and of the National Union of Journalists. He has been awarded the TV Personality Of The Year twice by Oireachtas na Gaeilge in 2003 and again in 2012 and has also been nominated for the same accolade by the Irish Film and Television Awards. He is credited for many programs including: "The Pure Drop", "Seó Bóthair", "Cleamhnas", "An Tuath Nua", "Míle Fáilte Míle Slan", "Showband Show", "Ceol Tíre", "Gradam Ceoil TG4", and "7Lá". 7Lá hosted TG4's Irish Presidential Debate in 2011 from which President Michael D Higgins emerged victorious. Ó Lionáird also lectures in Communications and Irish to degree level at GMIT.
