= Florida Folklife Program =

Host of folk performances in Florida

The Florida Folklife Program is part of the Florida Department of State in the U.S. state of Florida. Recordings of folk performances have been made as part of the program. It has hosted the Florida Folk Fest for 40 years as of 2019. It also hosts other events and performances.

== Releases ==
Drop on Down in Florida: Field Recordings of African American Traditional Music 1977-1980 is one of the program's recordings made in partnership with record label Dust-to-Digital and the State Archives of Florida. The expanded reissue received the Stetson Kennedy Award from the Florida Historical Society in 2013.

== Florida Folk Festival ==
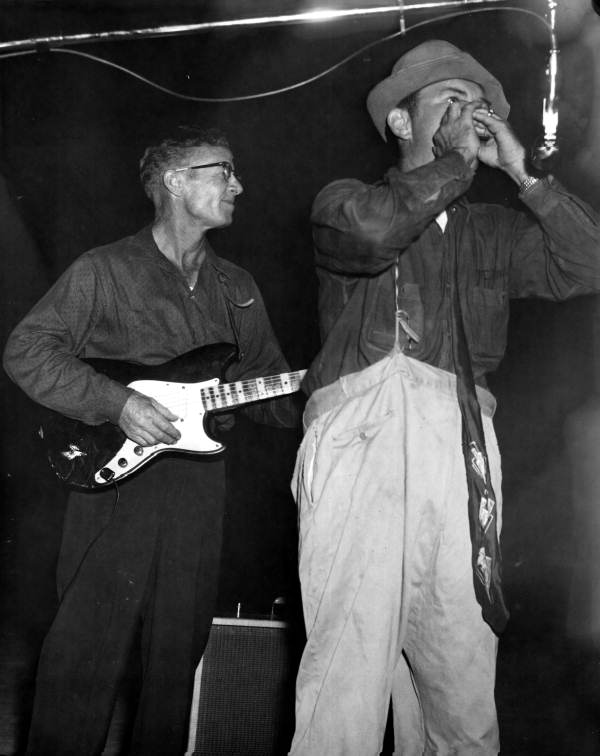
Leroy McDaniel performing

The Florida Folklife Festival is held annually in White Springs, Florida.
