= Erdan, Yazd =

Erdan اردان
- Village
- Erdan Castle

- Location within Iran
- Coordinates: 31°23′30″N 53°50′24″E
- Country: Iran
- Province: Yazd
- County: Taft
- Bakhsh: Central
- Rural District: Dehshir

Population (2006)
  - Total: 66
- Time zone: UTC+3:30 (IRST)
  - Summer (DST): UTC+4:30 (IRDT)

Erdan (Persian: اردان, also Romanized as Erdān and Ardān; also known as Ardun) is a village in Dehshir Rural District, in the Central District of Taft County, Yazd Province, Iran. At the 2006 census, its population was 66, in 31 families.
