= The Journal of Music =

Irish music magazine

Journal of Music (formerly Journal of Music in Ireland, or JMI) is an Irish music magazine founded in 2000. It "has been a critical voice in Traditional and Contemporary musics since 2000". In 2009 it was relaunched as the Journal of Music.

In 2010, the Journal of Music was the recipient of Utne Reader magazine's Utne Independent Press Award for Arts Coverage.
