= Gradam Ceoil TG4 =

Irish music award

Gradam Ceoil
- Awarded for: Traditional Irish Music
- Country: Ireland
- First award: 1998
- Website: Official website

Television/radio coverage
- Network: TG4

TG4's Gradam Ceoil was set up in 1998 with the purpose of recognising the various musicians and organisations who are significant in the creation of Irish Traditional music and in developing both the music and other musicians in Ireland and around the world. It is considered the premier Traditional Irish Music Award event.

The awards are annual, given at a concert which highlights the recipients and is broadcast live on TG4. It is considered that channel's flagship event.

== Judges ==
The judging panel is made up of experts in traditional music. It has included Áine Hensey, Ann Mulqueen, Breanndán Ó Beaglaoich, Caoimhín O Fearghail, Caoimhín Ó Raghallaigh, Cathal Goan, Ciarán Ó Gealbháin, Claire Keville, Conor Byrne, Dermot McLaughlin, Fintan Vallely, John Blake, Kevin Crawford, Liz Doherty, Mary Bergin, Mary McPartlan, Meaití Joe Shéamuis Ó Fátharta, Muireann Nic Amhlaoibh, Muiris Ó Rócháin, Neansaí Ní Choisdealbha, Niamh de Búrca, Pat Ahern, Proinsias Ní Ghráinne, Robbie Hannan and Úna Monaghan.

== History ==
The Awards began with just two, Traditional Musician of the Year and Young Traditional Musician of the Year, and has since expanded to include six awards, all given during the annual event.

1. Traditional Musician of the Year (Gradam Ceoil), started in 1998.
2. Young Traditional Musician of the Year (Ceoltóir Óg), started in 1998.
3. Singer of the Year (Amhránaí na Bliana), started in 2001.
4. Lifetime Achievement Award (Gradam Saoil), started in 2001.
5. Composer of the Year (Gradam an Chumadóra), started in 2001 and presented to 2013. In 2014 a musical collaboration award was presented instead.
6. Special Contribution Award (Gradam na gCeoltóirí), is presented to musicians and organisations that have worked tirelessly for the preservation and dissemination of Irish traditional music.
