= Baile na hAbhann, County Galway =

Baile na hAbhann Ballynahown
- Village and townland
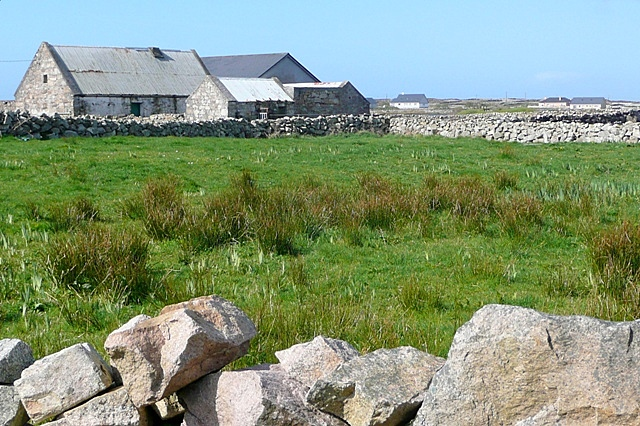

- Location in Ireland
- Coordinates: 53°14′05″N 9°30′25″W
- Country: Ireland
- Province: Connacht
- County: Galway
- Elevation: 9 m (30 ft)
- Irish Grid Reference: M043212

Baile na hAbhann, anglicised as Ballynahown, is a Gaeltacht village about 31 km (19 mi) west of Galway, Ireland, on the R336 regional road between Indreabhán and Casla. The name means "town of the river". The village is in the townland of Baile na hAbhann Theas (Ballynahown South).

The Irish-language television channel TG4 has its headquarters here. The village is served by Bus Éireann route 424 from Galway City.
