= TG4 =

Irish-language television network

- Logo used since 2012
- Country: Republic of Ireland
- Broadcast area: Ireland; Northern Ireland; Worldwide (online with both live streaming and some of its programming)

Programming
- Languages: Irish, English
- Picture format: 1080i (HDTV) 16:9
- Timeshift service: TG4 +1; TG4 +2 (online only)

Ownership
- Owner: Teilifís na Gaeilge
- Key people: Deirdre Ní Choistín (director general)

History
- Launched: 31 October 1996; 29 years ago
- Former names: Teilifís na Gaeilge (TnaG) (1996–1999)

Links
- Website: TG4.ie

Availability

Terrestrial
- Saorview: Channel 4 (HD)
- Freeview (Northern Ireland only): Channel 53 (SD)

Streaming media
- TG4.ie: Watch live
- Virgin TV Anywhere: Watch live (Ireland only)

TG4 (/ˌtiː dʒiː ˈkæhər/; Irish: TG Ceathair, pronounced [ˌtʲeːɟeː ˈcahəɾʲ]) is an Irish free-to-air public service television channel. It launched on 31 October 1996 and is available online and through its on-demand service TG4 Player in Ireland and beyond.

TG4 was initially known as Teilifís na Gaeilge (TnaG). It was the third national station to be launched in Ireland, after RTÉ One in 1961 (as Teilifís Éireann) and RTÉ Two in 1978. It was followed by a fourth channel, TV3 (known as Virgin Media One since 2018), in 1998. TnaG was renamed TG4 in 1999.

On average 1.2m people watch TG4 in the Republic of Ireland every week. 650,000 viewers tune into the channel each day. It has a 2% share of the national television market in the Republic of Ireland and 3% of the national television market in Northern Ireland. The daily Irish-language programme schedule is its core service: seven hours of programming in Irish supported by a wide range of material in other languages, mostly English and French.

== Channels ==
- TG4 (launched 31 October 1996; upscaled to HD in 2012)
- TG4 +1 (launched 3 February 2021, online only and Saorview from September 8, 2023)
- TG4 +2 (launched 3 February 2021, online only)
- Cúla4 (Children's channel, launched 8 September 2023)

=== TG4 HD ===
TG4 HD launched on 2 October 2012, exclusively on UPC Ireland (since rebranded as Virgin Media Ireland), and later on Sky in August 2016 and Saorview on 1 December 2022. The first HD broadcast featured the 2012 TG4 Ladies Gaelic Football Championship final. TG4 HD, similar to RTÉ Two HD, broadcasts mainly sporting programming from national to international events, documentaries, movies and US programming in high-definition where available. It is anticipated that TG4 will itself start broadcasting its own programming produced in high-definition in the future.

Format

- The channel simulcasts content from TG4 SD and upscales SD content into HD. All other content on the channel will be made available entirely in HD.

== History ==
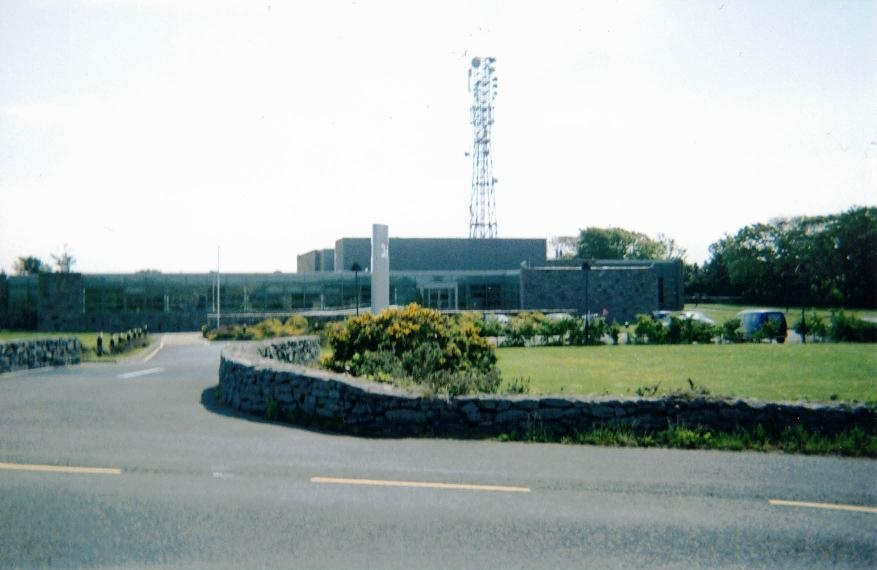
TG4 headquarters in Baile na hAbhann, County Galway (2014)

In 1969, Lelia Doolan, Jack Dowling and Bob Quinn published Sit down and Be Counted, a book describing their campaign for a separate Irish-language television service. Bob Quinn is a film director who produced many documentaries and fiction films in the Irish language on limited budgets, including the first Irish-language feature film Poitín starring Niall Tóibín, Cyril Cusack and Donal McCann.

The three writers proposed small temporary buildings for Gaeltacht regional television services broadcasting a limited number of hours each night, with programming coming from each of the Gaeltacht regions around the country.

RTÉ and the Irish government had sought to improve the availability of Irish-language programming on RTÉ services. In 1972, RTÉ Raidió na Gaeltachta (RnaG) was set up to provide Irish-language radio services across the country. All radio and television services provided by RTÉ provided some Irish-language programming.

In 1980, a new group called Coiste ar son Teilifís Gaeltachta (The Committee for Gaeltacht Television) was set up. In 1987 they set up the pirate television station Teilifís na Gaeltachta, after years of delays, including the sudden death of their technician who was to build the transmitter. Eighteen hours of live and pre-recorded programming was broadcast between 2 and 5 November 1987. The transmitter was built at a cost of IR£4,000 through donations from local Gaeltacht communities. In December 1988, further broadcasts were transmitted from three different sites, broadcasting pre-recorded programming.

The movement for a national Irish-language television service continued to gain momentum afterwards. In 1989, Ciarán Ó Feinneadha, one of the members of Coiste ar son Teilifís Gaeltachta, moved to Dublin and set up a similar organisation in the capital called Feachtas Náisiúnta Teilifíse (FTN). FTN outlined their demands:

- A television station to be set up in the Gaeltacht regions serving the Gaeltacht and Irish speakers across the country.
- It should be linked to RTÉ, but independent from both editorial and organisational points of view.
- A special authority set up to run it with representatives from RTÉ, the Department of Communications, and Údarás na Gaeltachta.

It was also suggested that the cap on advertising on RTÉ be removed and the additional funds be designated for the new services. Ray Burke had limited the advertising minutes on RTÉ a few years previously. Hence, there would be no cost to the Exchequer, and funding would also come from the National Lottery and the television Licence.

FTN suggested two hours of programming each day, with the rest of the broadcast hours used for Open University–type programming.

In the early 1990s, Irish-language programmes amounted to only 5% of total programming broadcast by RTÉ, and this was reduced significantly during the summer months. Programmes included Echo Island for children, and current affairs programme Cursaí. Before the establishment of TG4, RTÉ had suggested the use of RTÉ Two's prime-time schedule for Irish-language programming.

The outgoing coalition parties of Fianna Fáil and the Progressive Democrats (PDs) called for the establishment of an Irish-language television station in their 1989 manifestos. Fianna Fáil stated that it would set up an Irish-language television service in the Galway Gaeltacht that would service the whole country. The PDs also looked to the setting-up of what they called "Teilifís na Gaeltacha" (TnaG). The Green Party's manifesto from 1987 also called for the establishment of such a channel.

Fianna Fáil entered into coalition with the Labour Party in 1993, and as part of their programme for government, the parties included the setting-up of TnaG. Taoiseach Albert Reynolds appointed Michael D. Higgins as Minister for Arts, Culture and the Gaeltacht and responsibility for broadcasting was given to this department. Higgins and other Labour ministers resigned in November 1994. In December 1994, the government was succeeded by the Rainbow Coalition. Higgins was re-appointed as Minister for Arts, Culture and the Gaeltacht under Taoiseach John Bruton. The new programme for government also sought to launch TnaG as the 3rd channel. TnaG launched in 1996.

=== On the air ===
The total cost in establishing the transmission and links networks, and the construction of the station's headquarters in the Connemara Gaeltacht, was IR£16.1 million (€20.4 million). Annual running costs increased from IR£10.2 million (€12.95 million) in 1996 to IR£16 million (€20.3 million) in 2001, and €30 million in 2006.

In fewer than six months from the launch of Teilifís na Gaeilge, almost 65% of Ireland's television sets were able to receive the channel and the nightly audience had risen to 250,000 viewers. Three months later, in May 1997, independent research revealed that the station was able to attract audiences of 500,000, or 68% of television sets in Ireland, for at least one hour's viewing per week.

Very significant assistance in non-monetary terms comes from RTÉ which is required to provide over 360 hours of programming annually at no cost to TG4. TnaG did not come on air until 1996. The initial aim was to show one hour of Irish-language programming each night, increasing to two hours by 1999.

Initial criticisms of the planned station came from journalist Kevin Myers who derided TnaG as a white elephant, calling it 'Teilifís De Lorean', in a reference to the ill-fated DeLorean Motor Company. The launch of the channel was seen with massive uncertainties, especially regarding its viability as a commercial company, precisely at a time when the television market was inclinating more towards audience fragmentation, with the appearance of narrow themed channels with specific targets. By 1998, the channel had an audience of 340,000 viewers, up from 167,500 in 1996/97. In order to increase its revenue, TnaG started producing English versions of some of its TV series, using Ireland Network Television as an intermediary for worldwide sales. By then, Ros na Rún was sold to channels in Scotland, Wales and the USA; C.U. Burn to Wales; Draíocht to Australia; Spastoireacht to Finland; Barrabas to Spain and South Africa, Sult to the USA and An Bealach o Dheas to the Travel Channel.

=== Becoming TG4 ===
TnaG was the third terrestrial television channel in Ireland. A fourth channel, TV3, was launched on 20 September 1998. Despite being the fourth channel in Ireland, TV3's naming secured it the "third place" listing in many television listings, which had previously been occupied by TnaG. TnaG was renamed TG4 in September 1999, which reduced the likelihood of being further relegated in television listings and/or on television sets.

In 2006, the Irish postal service, An Post, marked ten years of the Irish-language station with a commemorative stamp. The station published a book entitled TG4@10: Deich mBliana de TG4 (Ten Years of TG4).

On 1 April 2007, Teilifís na Gaeilge became an independent statutory corporation. Former Gaelic Athletic Association president Peter Quinn became first chairman of the corporation. The other members appointed to the authority were Joe Connolly, Pádraig MacDonnacha, Eilís Ní Chonghaile, Méabh Mhic Ghairbheith, Méadhbh Nic an Airchinnigh, Bríd Ní Neachtáin, Feargal Ó Sé, and Regina Culliton. Coinciding with TG4's independence from RTÉ, TG4 began broadcasting news from France 24 instead of Euronews. RTÉ holds a share in Euronews, meaning TG4 could no longer broadcast the service.

On 1 July 2007, TG4 became a member of the European Broadcasting Union.

In 2008, TG4 became a founding member of World Indigenous Television Broadcasters Network (WITBN).

On 12 July 2009, the Broadcasting Act 2009 was enacted. Many of the provisions of the Act relating to RTÉ also apply to TG4, with the station being subject to regulation from the Broadcasting Authority of Ireland. The Act also changed the English-language title of the Chief Executive of TG4 to "Director General" in line with that of the head of RTÉ, and in the Irish language from "Ceannasaí" to "Ardstiúrthóir". There have been two Chief Executives and three Director Generals of TG4: Cathal Goan (who later became Director General of RTÉ from 2003 to 2010), Pól Ó Gallchóir (1999–2009 as Chief Executive, 2009–2016 as Director General), and Alan Esslemont (2016 to 2025). Deirdre Ní Choistín was appointed Director General in April 2025.

The Irish language enthusiast Seán Tadhg Ó Gairbhí wrote Súil eile (published by Cois Life in 2017). The Irish Times selected it as one of its best Irish-language books of the year and described it as "the standard book for anyone wanting to take a súil eile at the history of the station for years to come".

== Operation ==
The daily Irish-language programme schedule is its central service, broadcasting approximately 2.5 hours a day of new Irish-language programming, with an estimated 2.5 hours a day of repeated Irish-language programmes. Currently, RTÉ supplies TG4 with one hour a day of Irish-language programming. The remainder of the TG4 schedule is made up of acquisitions from other broadcasters particularly from US broadcasters.

Operating as a publisher and broadcaster, TG4 invests up to €20m annually in original indigenous programming from the independent production sector in Ireland. The Irish-language soap opera Ros na Rún is one of its most popular programmes, and it also commissions a relatively large number of documentaries.

=== Scheduling ===
During the first two years of TnaG, the service provided a "blocked" schedule. A distinct language schedule was created in line with their commitment to provide two hours of Irish-language television each day. Children's television ran from 17:00 to 18:00, while the prime time Irish-language block began at 20:00 and ended at 22:30 each night. In 1998, the channel began experimenting with their prime time schedule (due to low audience figures and pressure from independent producers). The prime time block was reduced by 30 minutes, ending at 22:00, while they tested Irish-language programming in late-night slots after English-language programming, this schedule increased the audience for Irish programmes that followed English programmes. A new "hammocking" schedule was introduced. "Hammocking" is a term used in public service broadcasting meaning that shows with low audience appeal are placed between programmes with high appeal, thus increasing audience share for weaker programming. In 1999, the channel was renamed as TG4. The main aim of its new schedules was to provide "national resonance" and to compete with BBC Two and Channel 4 for Irish audiences.

TG4 lost its language-driven schedule and replaced it with a stronger audience-driven schedule, with key audiences delivered at key times. TG4 aims to be a mainstream channel for a niche audience. This new scheduling provided TG4 with a strong increase in audience share during the first six months of the newly re-branded channel, rising from 1% to 2% and, by 2005, TG4 had become the eighth most watched television channel with 2.4% audience share, just below BBC Two and Channel 4, and well ahead of Sky One.

=== Budget ===
The Government reduced TG4's grant-in-aid from the exchequer to €32.25m for 2010.

From 2012 to 2018 TG4 received a portion of the licence fee, full exchequer funding returned in 2019. In 2024 TG4 received €53.53m from the exchequer.

Year	Exchequer funding	Licence fee	RTÉ programming commitment	Sound & Vision BAI	Northern Ireland ILBF	IFB	Commercial	Total funding
2023	53.53	0	7.6				4.1	65.23
2018	29	4.2	7				3.1	43.3
2012	32.5	9.25	7.7	3.5	1.6	0	1.76	47.31
2010	32.25	0	8.9	4.7		0.46	3.48	49.79
2009	35	0	10					45

In 2008, the Teilifís na Gaeilge authority received a budget of €38m for and co-funded productions with the BAI's sound and vision fund received €4.6m. The Department of Communications, Marine and Natural Resources reduced their budget from the exchequer to €35m for 2009.

In 2007, TG4 earned €3,596,000 in advertising revenue and had state funding of €24,914,000. The station spent €17,716,000 on programming.

In 2006, TG4 spent €15,469,000 on commissioned programming and €7.5 million on acquired shows. The latter consisted mainly of children's programmes which are dubbed into Irish.

The table below shows TG4's commissioned programming by genre in 2006:

Genre	Budget	Hours
Ros na Rún	€3,446,000	36
Documentaries	€1,924,000	60
Sport	€3,828,000	283
Drama	€2,418,000	25
Music	€1,378,000	63
Entertainment	€1,391,000	60
Travel	€267,000	4
Studio	€438,000	66
Total	€15,469,000	597

RTÉ provides TG4 with its news service Nuacht TG4. Independent producers (with the backing of TG4) apply for the Broadcasting Authority of Ireland's Sound and Vision Fund. The Irish Language Broadcasting Fund (ILBF) also provides some funding to programmes made for the channel; the fund is administered by Northern Ireland Screen.

=== Ratings ===
2010	2009	2001	1996
900,000	800,000	730,000	250,000

TG4 has had a share of the Irish television market of some 2–3%. TG4 provide their viewing figures each week on their website. Currently TG4's top ten programmes have ranged from 10,000 to 100,000 viewers, but their top shows have reached as high as 250,000. Like other television services TG4 achieves their highest viewing figures with sporting events.

On Saint Patrick's Day 2009, live coverage of the All-Ireland Finals in the AIB Club Championships on TG4 achieved very high audience ratings for the channel. Twenty five percent of afternoon television viewers on St. Patrick's Day were tuned into TG4. Over 1.1m viewers tuned on TG4 during the day, giving it an overall 8.2% national daily share and placing it in third place in the national daily viewing table for the first time ever. Other major ratings successes for the channel include the All Ireland Ladies Football Final with 21% of all viewers tuned to that broadcast. A series of Westerns has also proven very popular. On 25 April 2010, TG4's coverage of the Allianz Football League Finals in Croke Park saw it become the most watched channel, with 650,000 viewers watching some of the games. The Division One final had an average audience of 220,000 viewers.

Some of the most popular programmes included: Glór Tíre (country and western reality competition) – 90–110,000; Rásaí na Gaillimhe (political comedy drama); Ros na Rún (soap opera), GAA Beo (GAA sport) – 50–100,000; Fíorscéal, Cogar (documentary); Seacht (university drama); Nuacht TG4 (news); 7 Lá (weekly review); Paisean Faisean (dating programme), Feirm Factor (reality television); and An Jig Gig. These have had an audience reach of 3% to 12% of the total viewing audience, or 40,000 to 100,000 viewers.

== Programming ==
TG4 has nurtured a reputation for innovative programming in film, arts, drama, documentaries, and sports. Much of TG4's programming is subtitled in English. The station has a teletext service called Téacs TG4. Programmes broadcast on Saorview (not Sky or internet) are at times also subtitled in Irish.

=== Imported programming ===
TG4 broadcasts many popular US shows ranging from dramas to comedies. In the lead up to the transmissions of TnaG in the autumn of 1996, RTÉ tested transmissions with airings of Fawlty Towers. The TnaG service provided little in the way of imports except for children's programming. TnaG provided airings of QVC during daytime hours. TnaG aired Northern Exposure. They also dubbed into Irish a number of European, Welsh and Scottish programmes.

TnaG re-branded in 1999 as TG4 and with this came a fresh schedule which included more imported programming. Highly critically acclaimed US programming such as Oz, Nip/Tuck and The Wire aired on the channel. During this time, they extended out their range of adult and children's programming. Cúla4 na n-Óg began airing from 07:00 for pre-school children with programmes such as Tar ag Spraoi Sesame, Dora the Explorer and Wow! Wow! Wubbzy!, Cúla4 airs SpongeBob SquarePants, Ben 10, The Muppet Show, and others. In 2006 a strand called Ponc began airing with teen programming such as Pimp My Ride, MTV Cribs, 8 Simple Rules, America's Next Top Model, What I Like About You and South Park. Other series aired on the channel include Army Wives, Cold Case, Gossip Girl, One Tree Hill, The Starter Wife, True Blood, Two and a Half Men, Vampire Diaries, Without a Trace, Carnivàle, Curb Your Enthusiasm, Eve, Everwood, Invasion, Lipstick Jungle, The O.C., and Survivor.

TG4 often premieres such shows before other European broadcasters. TG4 previously held a long-term agreement with HBO to air the majority of their programmes on the channel. With the launch of Sky Atlantic in 2011, they now hold first rights to European (Ireland, UK, Germany, Austria, Italy and Switzerland) broadcasts of HBO shows. This means TG4 now broadcasts HBO programming at a much later date than in the past. TG4 held first rights to The Wire, Oz, Deadwood, Generation Kill, Six Feet Under, True Blood. They also held an agreement with AMC to air Breaking Bad until the series concluded. The channel later signed a deal with USA Network for exclusive rights to Mr. Robot.

In Autumn 2013, the broadcaster started moving away from US imports instead focusing on successful European drama series from the Nordic countries. On 28 August 2013, TG4 announced its new schedule for autumn/winter 2013. which relied on imports from internationally acclaimed Nordic dramas such as Arne Dahl from Sweden, The Bridge co-produced in Sweden and Denmark and Danish drama Borgen. US imports include new seasons of Nashville, Breaking Bad (final season), True Blood and new dramas Justified and Boss.

TG4 continued to air Two and a Half Men up to the departure of Charlie Sheen, when RTÉ Two began airing the series.

=== News and current affairs ===
All of TG4's news and current affairs programming is provided by RTÉ free of charge to the channel. In 1996, Nuacht TnaG started broadcasting from the TnaG Newsrooms in Baile na hAbhann. From 13 July 2009, all television broadcasts of Nuacht RTÉ broadcast from the Baile na hAbhann studios. The main news anchor for Nuacht RTÉ is Siún Nic Gearailt, who was the main news anchor for TG4 from 2002 to 2004, before moving to RTÉ.

Nuacht TnaG initially was broadcast at 22:00 each night, later moving to 20:00 and finally to 19:00 where it currently remains. From 1996 to 1998, Gráinne Seoige was the main news anchor for the channel, in 1998 she moved to TV3 to launch their main evening news where she remained until 2004. In 1998, Ailbhe Ó Monachain became TG4's main news anchor. With the rebranding of TnaG as TG4 the news service also renamed Nuacht TG4. In 2004, Eimear Ní Chonaola became TG4's main news anchor. Since September 2010, Nóiméad Nuachta (News Minute) has broadcast each week day at 13:55.

Each Tuesday Night Páidí Ó Lionáird hosts their Current Affairs flagship show 7 Lá (7 Days), the name derives from RTÉ's original Current Affairs programme 7 Days. Every Sunday night, Eimear Ní Chonaola presents Timpeall na Tíre, a round-up of all the major stories of the week.

During the summer months they provide Féilte presented by Sinéad Ní Loideáin and Bríd Richardson. It takes a similar format to RTÉ's Nationwide, reporting on festivals around Ireland during the summer months.

TG4 provides live coverage of Dáil Éireann each Wednesday and Thursday morning; as well as live coverage of the proceedings of key Dáil Committees from time to time.

TG4 has also provided coverage of the 1997, 2002, 2007, 2011, and 2016 general elections, coverage of European and local elections 2004, 2009, and 2014 and coverage of the annual national Budgets, and coverage of Údarás na Gaeltachta elections.

During the night, TG4 airs a simulcast of France 24 live from Paris.

=== Sports ===
The channel extensively covers Irish sports, such as the secondary Gaelic football and hurling competitions and club championships, and women's Gaelic football (it also broadcasts Pro14). These are events which generally do not appeal to a mass audience, but have a reasonably loyal following. Many of the events that TG4 provides coverage of are in sports in which other Irish broadcasters would not usually be interested; the channel has gained a reputation for providing coverage of minority sporting events, and repeat coverage of rugby and Gaelic games under the programming strand Rugbaí Gold and GAA Gold, showing highlights of classic games from the archives. Seó Spóirt broadcasts a round-up of the week's sporting news with a selected panel, it is hosted by Dara Ó Cinnéide. TG4 provided coverage of Volvo Ocean Race when it arrived in Galway in May 2009.

==== GAA ====
Since 2000 TG4 has sponsored ladies' Gaelic football's All-Ireland competition under the name TG4 Ladies Football All-Ireland Championships (Irish: Craobhacha TG4 i bPeil Na mBan). They have provided live coverage of the men's Gaelic football league and round-up of the men's football and hurling championships during the summer months with their GAA round up programme called GAA – followed by the year it is broadcast, for example in 2011 it was called GAA 2011. They also provide live coverage of the Under 21 All-Ireland competitions and club competitions. In late 2010, TG4 began to broadcast a new handball show, entitled The GAA Handball Show.

==== Rugby ====
They previously had exclusive rights to show Magner's Rugby League from 2001 to 2004. In 2004 the Irish rights were sold to Setanta Sports, where it was broadcast exclusively from 2004 to 2010. In 2010 TG4 won back the rights for Pro12 rugby union with RTÉ, BBC Northern Ireland, S4C and BBC Alba. In 2011 TG4 took a major coup in taking away exclusive highlights of the Heineken Cup and Amlin Challenge Cup from RTÉ Sport. This led to TG4 having live coverage of the new Pro14 (a re-branding of the Celtic League) in 2011, as well as highlights of the top matches in European rugby.

On top of this, the channel bought Irish-language rights to the 2011 Rugby World Cup, thus obtaining lucrative rights to re-run matches from the Rugby World Cup 2011 in the afternoon. Therefore, Setanta Ireland had all matches live, RTÉ had 13 live matches, including all-Irish matches and every match from the quarter-finals onwards. TG4 re-broadcast all the big matches in the afternoon, such as the Ireland v Australia match and England and Welsh match.

In 2014, the Irish-language channel received praise for airing the Women's Rugby World Cup. TG4 provided coverage to all of the Irish matches as well as the final and semi-final.

==== Football (Soccer) ====
TG4 broadcasts highlights programme called Olé Olé for Spanish La Liga which it extended to include the Scottish Premier League in 1997. The series no longer airs on the channel. TG4 held rights to League of Ireland with RTÉ and Setanta Sports. They have also broadcast UEFA Cup games in the past. TG4 did broadcast Friday night matches called Sacar Beo which showed League of Ireland matches and cup matches, but RTÉ and Setanta retain those rights now.

In 2019, TG4 broadcasts FIFA Women's World Cup with RTÉ. TG4 broadcasts 29 of 52 matches in Irish.

TG4 broadcast the first live League of Ireland Women's Premier Division game from Tolka Park on 2 October 2021 with hosts Shelbourne beating DLR Waves 1:0. Games are regularly shown live on TG4.

==== Tennis ====
TG4 broadcast exclusive Irish coverage of the Wimbledon Championships tennis tournament. TG4's coverage of the tournament began in 2005, with their coverage being viewed by on average 300,000 viewers each day in 2008. RTÉ commonly showed Wimbledon for a number of years before dropping the tournament in 2001; there was then no coverage until TG4 took over the broadcasts in 2005. This proved popular as coverage has been more than it ever was on RTÉ, and with Connor Niland becoming the first Irish player at Wimbledon in 30 years their coverage continues to grow. TG4'S coverage of the Roland Garros Tennis began in 2008, which started with just highlights of everyday and the finals live. This proved popular so now TG4 coverage begins with highlights until the final week of the tournament when live coverage begins.

==== Cycling ====
TG4 provide live coverage of Tour de France French cycling. TG4's live coverage of the Tour de France began in 2005.

==== International Rules Series ====
TG4 hold the television rights to the International Rules 2010/2011 season and 2013/14 season. TG4 also provide a highlights package of Australian Football League games.

==== Snooker ====
TG4 for a number of years showed the Northern Ireland Trophy Snooker event from the Belfast Waterfront Hall. This started in 2005 and they showed every NI Trophy tournament until it was scrapped in 2009. This was advertised as their season of sport which started in 2005 and started with Wimbledon, le Tour de France and finished with the NI Trophy. This was firstly a non-ranking event, then became a ranking event. TG4 were the official broadcaster. Their coverage, Snucar Beo, featured analysis from Irish players such as Fergal O'Brien and Ken Doherty and Northern Ireland players such as Patrick Wallace who were not Irish speakers and would provide analysis in English before the presenter would go back to talking in Irish. This is what usually happens in sports coverage on TG4 where links to cameras, reports and commentary are usually in Irish and interviews and analysis in rugby, football and snooker are usually in English.

=== Entertainment ===
Since its inception TG4 has provided a huge amount of light entertainment programming to its Irish speaking audience, such as the chat show Ardán and the fashion/dating show Paisean Faisean.

Cleamhnas ("Matchmaker") was TG4's first attempt at a blind date type of show. It was presented by Seán Bán Breathnach and later by Páidí Ó Lionáird. The audience would be introduced to the contestant looking for love and then to one of their parents (generally the father of a male contestant and the mother of a female contestant), then introduced to three suitors. The father or the mother would then ask the suitors questions about how they would treat their son or daughter. The presenter would then go into the audience to talk to the suitor's friends. It would then be up to the mother or father to choose which suitor would go on a blind date with their son or daughter.

This show ran for a number of years and was eventually replaced by Paisean Faisean where three boys/men select clothes for a girl, who would then choose the boy, based on the clothes that they had picked. This show was presented in the first three series by Aoife Ní Thuairisg, and in the fourth series by Blathnáid Nic Dhonnacha and Máiread Ni Chuaig. Máiread was replaced in 2008 by Síle Seoige.

Eochair An Ghrá ("Key to the Heart") started airing in 2008 and is similar in format to MTV's Room Raiders.

The producers of Paisean Faisean, Magma Films, have since sold the rights to Zoo Productions who will produce the series for MTV under the title Style Date.

In 1996 TG4 aired Hollywood Anocht ("Hollywood Tonight"), a movie show presented by Síle Seoige.

In 2004 TG4 launched a new strand of programming called Síle. It was presented by Síle Ní Bhraonáin and ran from 17:30 to 19:00 each weeknight. It was similar in format to RTÉ's Two Tube.

On 24 September 2007, TG4 began broadcasting South Park in Irish, on Síle, with the more adult content removed but also made available on Saturday nights. In 2009 Síle was replaced by Ponc.

They also had a number of quiz shows, including 90 Seconds. TG4 is a great way for students in Leaving Certificate or GCSCs or A-Levels who is studying Irish to learn from. Research has shown that those who watch or listen to TG4 are deemed to have a better understanding of the language. As well as that, having Gaeilge as a first or second language is shown to lead to more employment opportunities.

On Friday late evenings, they would often broadcast a classic film such as a western, or alternatively a foreign language film.

=== Music ===
TG4 have a long tradition of providing Irish Traditional music on the channel. Geantraí is filmed around Ireland, with coverage of traditional music from many pubs around the country. Repeats of Irish traditional music programmes from RTÉ feature in the schedules such as The Pure Drop and Come West Along the Road.

TG4 presents a six awards for Irish traditional music, celebrating and giving due recognition to the recordings, broadcasts and live performances of the recipients of the awards:

1. Traditional musician of the year, Gradam Ceoil, started in 1998.
2. Young traditional musician of the Year, Ceoltóir Óg, started in 1998.
3. Singer of the Year, Amhránaí na Bliana, started in 2001.
4. Lifetime Achievement award, Gradam Saoil, started in 2001.
5. Composer of the year, Gradam an Chumadóra, started in 2001 and presented to 2013. In 2014 a musical collaboration award was presented instead.
6. Special contribution award, Gradam na gCeoltóirí, is presented to musicians and organisations that have worked tirelessly for the preservation and dissemination of Irish traditional music.

Since the mid-2000s TG4 have provided coverage of Country and Western music.

Popular music on the channel started out with Ó Bun Go Barr ("From Top to Bottom"), which is now known as POP 4 and is presented by Eoghan Mac Diarmada, is Ireland's only Top 40 countdown chart show. It also acts as a chart request show and a launch pad for new and upcoming Irish bands.

Indie music is covered on Ar An Imeall ("On The Edge"), a spin-off series of TG4 Arts strand Imeall ("Edge").

On 23 March 2015, TG4 confirmed its participation in the Junior Eurovision Song Contest 2015. Later that year, it organised a national final, produced by Adare Productions, to select its representative at the contest, who turned out to be Aimee Banks. It marked Ireland's first participation in the contest and was the first time since 1972 that Irish was heard at a Eurovision event. In the Junior Eurovision Song Contest 2022 Sophie Lennon represented Ireland with "Solas", which placed 4th, the highest placing of an Irish entry in a Eurovision contest since the nation finished 3rd at the Eurovision Dance Contest 2007, and the highest placing of any Irish-language song.

=== Reality television ===
SÓS (the Irish for "break", and the use of a pun on "SOS") was one of TG4s early attempts at reality television. It followed a group of contestants in the bleakness of the Connemara landscape, left with nothing and to fend for themselves. It was a television version of Gay Byrne's radio experiment from the 1980s.

Ní Gaelgoir Mé was TG4's version of S4C's successful show, getting celebrities to learn Irish for a week. It was presented by Aoife Ní Thuairisg.

In 2003 TG4 launched their search for Ireland's next top country and western singer. Glór Tíre is now into its 6th successful season on the channel. Often landing the top spot on their top ten shows, it has a regular audience of 100,000 viewers.

In 2008 TG4 launched their search for the best farmer in Ireland. Feirm Factor had 12 farmers competing with each other to see who was the best. The judging panel consisted of Maura Derrane (former Ireland AM presenter), Alan Dukes (former Minister for Agriculture) and Seán O Lionaird (dairy farmer from Cork). The second series of Feirm Factor was broadcast from January to March 2010. Welsh television station S4C has started broadcasting their own version of the show in 2010, called Fferm Ffactor.

Underdogs searched for the best amateur football team from groups of men and women with no previous experience in Minor or Senior GAA football. The judging panel consisted of Geraldine Feerick, Jarlath Burns and Éamon Ó Muircheartaigh.

TG4 commissioned two reality talent shows for the channel from Adare Productions. Glas Vegas has a similar format to America's Got Talent and The All Ireland Talent Show. Nollig No. 1 has a similar format to You're a Star as the judges search for a Christmas number one single. The 2008 winner was Mary Lee, she released the single "You'll Never Walk Alone", with the chorus 'as Gaeilge'. In September 2009 another series from the same stable began the search for Ireland's best Irish dancing act, entitled An Jig Gig. The winners of this series were Irish Beats. A fourth season of Glas Vegas began in January 2010.

TG4 have broadcast all series of the American version of Survivor with an Irish-language dub.

In 2015, TG4 launched a new dating show called Pioc do Ride where contestants choose a date from three potential partners based only on their car.

=== Drama ===
In the early years TG4 gained critical acclaim for C.U. Burn, a comedy series about a Donegal undertaker, and Gleann Ceo, a comedy about a small-town Garda station in Donegal.

Ros na Rún is TG4's long-running soap opera, which broadcast for 35 weeks of the year with two episodes each week. It is now in its 24th season on the channel. It airs Tuesday and Thursday at 20:30, with an omnibus edition at 22:30 each Sunday.

TG4 have also supported many Irish filmmakers with their Lasair short film programme fund.

In 2006 TG4 commissioned Teenage Cics, their first youth drama. Set during the 1980s in the Donegal Gaeltacht, it follows the exploits of young students from Belfast going to the Gaeltacht to learn Irish. This was followed by their successful teen drama Aifric.

In 2007 TG4 won major critical acclaim for its political satirical comedy The Running Mate and for the programme Seacht which follows the lives of seven college students in Belfast.

Their drama series Rásaí na Gaillimhe (part funded by the BAI's Sound and Vision Fund) was a major hit for the channel, becoming their second most popular show just after Glór Tíre. Set during the week of the Galway Races, it is a drama-comedy starring Don Wycherley, Ruth Bradley, Olga Wherly, Hughie McGarvey and Owen Roe.

TG4 broadcast its first supernatural thriller on 13 January 2010. Na Cloigne ("Heads") is set in contemporary Ireland and revolves around a young couple (Nuala and Séan). Nuala is an artist with supernatural powers connecting her to the Otherworld and is faced with an adulterous boyfriend. Soon two young women Séan brings home for a nightcap are found dead.

TG4 continued its successful drama output with their comedy An Crisis("The Crisis"), and Crisis Eile (in 2013). This series has poked fun at the Irish economic downturn and the effects on the promotion of the Irish language. The comedy initially centred around the office of the acting-chairman of ACT (An Chomhairle Teanga/The Language Commissioner) played by Risteárd Cooper as he fought to save the organisations from An Bord Snip Nua.

Corp & Anam is a four-part series from TG4 starring Diarmuid de Faoite and Maria Doyle Kennedy (The Tudors). It was originally broadcast in early 2011. A second series aired on the channel in 2014.

==== Praise for TG4 drama ====
"The reality is that Irish-language television dramas, no matter how acclaimed or however many awards they might win, are unlikely to show up in box set form in any DVD mega-store. TG4's viewership ranges from between 2 and 4 per cent of the population, enough to cost a politician an election but far too few viewers to send a show into the top 10 in the television ratings.
A shame, because there are great things happening in the area. TG4's recent batch of mini-series Rasaí na Gaillimhe, Paddywhackery and Na Cloigne (not to mention Aifric, Seacht and long-running soap Ros na Rún) have featured outrageous plots and wacky characters, and dare to be politically incorrect: they get away with it because they are in Irish."

"the first episode of An Crisis, a new six-parter from TG4, was laugh out loud funny – interspersed with a couple of knowing sniggers."

=== Children's television ===
In 1996, TnaG started its children's programming under the strand Cullabulla (taken from Hiberno-English). Since then they have renamed and extended the strand as Cúla4.

=== Factual ===
It also actively commissions documentaries such as the acclaimed and popular Amú series of travel programmes which launched the career of Hector Ó hEochagáin, one of a number of TG4 presenters who have gone on to success at other channels. Others include newsreader Gráinne Seoige. As many of these programs are subtitled in English, they are often popular with recent immigrant populations – who find spoken English very fast on Irish-produced television – as well as native Irish speakers.

They dub a French-Canadian documentary series under the name Fíor Scéal. Nello was another well received travel show looking at life in middle America.

They have a documentary strand called Cogar. Ealú was a series which looked at prison escapes around Ireland. They repeat the RTÉ shows Leargas (a new magazine show) and Scanna (reports on scandals that hit Ireland).

=== Re-dubbed programming ===
In the early years of TG4 the service repeated the Welsh teenage drama series Jabas which was re-dubbed into Irish from Welsh. They also aired the French cartoon Bouli as part of their children's schedule. Jabas and Bouli had previously aired on RTÉ Television. Again the Welsh series Pris y Farchnad was translated into Irish under the title An Craiceann is a Luach In general, however, TG4 perceived that live-action series aimed at adults re-dubbed into Irish was not an attractive proposition even for fluent Irish speakers, as is the case for many bilingual northern European viewers.

Since its launch TG4 has significantly increased the number of re-dubbed children's programmes from 70 hours in its first year to 200 hours. TG4 only re-dub cartoons while live action series remain in English, such as the Australian drama H_{2}O: Just Add Water and the American sitcom Lizzie McGuire. TG4 have re-dubbed all of the Harry Potter films into Irish and broadcast them each Saturday from January to March 2014. Some other live action children's movies such as Scooby-Doo have been re-dubbed into Irish.

=== Film ===
TG4 has a broad film policy which features a strong range of both independent and mainstream cinema. The channel places a strong emphasis on Irish films – both in the Irish and English languages – and European cinema which features films in French, German, Spanish, Italian, Polish, Danish and Swedish, among other languages. These films air under the strand Le Film TG4 regularly broadcast Westerns under the strand An Western, typically every Friday night.

Mainstream Hollywood cinema is represented by films from 20th Century Fox, Walt Disney Pictures and Warner Bros. among others. TG4 regularly broadcast such films on Tuesday Nights as part of their Scannán na Seachtaine ("Movie of the Week") strand. They sometimes re-dub children's films into Irish with English subtitles, the most notable being the Harry Potter films.

TG4 became the first channel to broadcast in full Stanley Kubrick's classic A Clockwork Orange, a season of Kubrick's films followed, including the European television premiere of Eyes Wide Shut. It also became one of the first channels in Europe to air the remastered director's cut version of The Exorcist, even before the UK, as they were still only airing the edited version.

TG4 has created Cine4 (formally TG4 Film) a film department which invests in Irish-speaking films and mainstream Irish films such as the critically acclaimed Room, Arracht, Tarrac, Foscadh and An Cailín Ciúin.

=== Subtitling and dubbing ===
==== Adult and prime time programming ====
TG4 do not dub live action film or television programming into Irish. Some reality television programming have the English voice over replaced by Irish-language voice over (which is also subtitled in English), however all contestants and presenters are not re-dubbed. In the early years of TnaG the channel broadcast many European programmes with Irish dubbing however this policy has since stopped in favour of US programming in English. Some non-English-language films are also subtitled on teletext page 888 in Irish. Most Irish-language programmes are subtitled on screen in English, however no live programming (such as news and sport) is subtitled into English. Many Irish-language programmes are also subtitled on teletext page 888 in Irish.

==== Children's and young people's programming ====
TG4's pre-school and children's strands, Cúla4 and Cúla4 na nÓg, do not have subtitles during live introductions. This was the same for their former teen strands Síle and Ponc. Many of the Irish-language cartoons are subtitled on page 888 for parents. TG4 broadcasts any US teen programming in English, while Irish-language programming is subtitled on screen in English. TG4 have re-dubbed a number of Hollywood children's films and feature animation into Irish.

== TG4 on demand ==
As of 2011, TG4's video on demand (VOD) service is called TG4 Player. Previously, the service was supplied by TG4 Beo; this service was launched in 2003 (and more recently in 2010) ahead of most European broadcasters. TG4 Player allows viewers globally to watch TG4 live and watch previously aired programming on demand.

The current service is delivered and maintained in partnership with Brightcove. For certain programmes, a choice of subtitles in Irish and English is available. According to TG4, the catch-up service has had over 2 million downloads in a 12-month period.

New apps for Smart TVs launched in February 2021, alongside this a live stream of TG4 +1 and TG4 +2, with a facility across all channel to start the current programme from the start.

== Awards ==
TG4 have won major national and international awards for their marketing campaigns and their programmes:

Campaign name	Award	Year
TG4 Rebrand	Gold Award - General Brand Design Package	Promax Europe 2021
Channel television advert – Seisiún	Bronze Award	EPICA 2008 and ICAD 2008
TV advert – Mobs Mheiriceá	Silver Award	ICAD 2008
Station ident – Female Warrior at the Washing Machine	Bronze Award	ICAD 2008
Peil na mBan – print ads	Gold Medal	Promax Europe 2008
	Gold Medal – Promo Print	Sharks International Awards 2008
	Bronze Medal – Print	Sharks International Awards 2008
Ros na Rún/Cold Case – television ads	Gold Medal	Promax Europe 2008
Ros na Rún/Cold Case – Best Film Promo	Silver Medal	Sharks International Awards 2008
Seacht	Greenhorne Award	Radio Advertising Awards 2008
Seacht	Silver Medal – Radio	Sharks International Awards 2008
Ros na Rún/Without a Trace	Silver Medal – Best Drama Promos	Sharks International Awards 2007
Ros na Rún/Cold Case	Gold Medal – Best Drama Promos	Sharks International Awards 2007
Ros na Rún/Cold Case	Silver Medal – Promos – Best Direction	Sharks International Awards 2007
Ros na Rún/Cold Case	Gold Medal – Promos – Best Editing	Sharks International Awards 2007
Ros na Rún/Cold Case	Silver Medal – Promos – Irish Broadcast	Sharks International Awards 2007
Ros na Rún/Niptuck	Ad of the Month – October '07	Irish Marketing Journal – Creative Ad of the Month
Paisean Faisean	Ad of the Decade	Irish Language Awards
TG4/Department of An Gaeltacht	Ad of the Decade	Irish Language Awards
Nip/Tuck & Ros na Rún	Bronze Medal	ICAD 2007
Ulster says Níl	Bronze Medal	ICAD 2007
Paisean Faisean	Commendation	Promax Awards International 2007
Wimbledon	Commendation	Promax Awards International 2007
Poem	Awarded	Radio Advertising Awards Gold Medal – Best Irish/American Drama Sharks International Awards 2006
Paisean Faisean	Gold Medal	Sharks International Awards 2007
Paisean Faisean	Bronze Medal	EPICA (European Awards)
Paisean Faisean	Best of Category	Radio Advertising Awards
Paisean Faisean	Gold Medal	Radio Advertising Awards
TG4 Outdoor Posters	Bronze Award:	ICAD Awards 2006
Paisean Faisean	Bronze Medal – Best Promo	ICAD 2005
Dearadh/Design	Winner: Two Golden Bell Awards for a TG4 promo and a TG4 channel "ident"	ICAD 2004

== On-air identity and marketing ==
TG4's on screen identity is very different from its counterparts', drawing upon the station's original slogan Súil Eile ("another view").

Its first idents were under their former name of TnaG. The music on TnaG's early ident sequences was produced by Irish composer Oisin Lunny. The opening sequence featured a number of Irish scenes from across the Island of Ireland, including Belfast and Dublin, and finished with a lighthouse, the light of which beamed the logo onto the screen. While the longer sequence went out at the beginning of each day and the end of the night, a shorter version went out before each programme. TnaG ran numerous marketing campaigns with this logo. Their main features were the difference of the Irish. One ad featured Red Lemonade. The slogan used in English was "Because we're Different" followed by the well known Irish slogan Súil Eile". Another marketing campaign featured the stars of the channel asking the question "What more do you look for from a station?" They would be based at various stations such as train and space stations.

In 1999 with the onset of digital television, TnaG was rebranded as TG4 to strengthen the perception of the brand, from being niche Irish-language-only channel to mainstream channel with Irish-language programmes. The TG4 ident continued with the difference aspect of the channel, that provides an alternative view, the slogan Súil Eile translates literally as "another eye" but is also a pun in Irish meaning "a different view". The logo takes the G from the original logo, separates it from the T and the T loses its Celtic script look. The promotion of the channel from TnaG to TG4 was done with the use of a caterpillar growing into a butterfly. During its 1999 rebrand TG4 would now feature a DOG in the top right hand corner on all of TG4's programming, previously a TnaG DOG featured only on Oireachtas and QVC broadcasts.

The idents from 1999 to 2003 featured various people playing or messing in the background of the screen before the logo appear with the words Súil Eile below the logo.

In 2003, numerous new idents were developed for the station, featuring fairies, bridges, launderette, cars, wrestlers etc. TG4 promotions now feature the seasons Geimhreadh (Winter), Earrach (Spring), Samhradh (Summer) and Fómhar (Autumn). The opening ad break ident states Fan Linn ("stay with us") and the ad break ends with Seo Linn ("here we are"). In autumn 2010 the season theme was dropped and replaced by a blue cube logo; the idents were updated with the TG4 logo animating up in a different way.

On Saturday 1 September 2012, TG4 launched its autumn schedule. At this time a new look was introduced, a new ident was introduced and all the miscellaneous presentation was revamped. An updated logo was launched which is now coloured a dark grey. The identity focuses on the theme of Irish folklore including the Children of Lir. For the first time since the channels launch the on-screen logo is found on the top left hand corner. All the new graphics are created for HD ahead of TG4 HD's launch on UPC on 2 October 2012. In-vision continuity followed by TG4's new generic ident. The generic ident is also used after weather updates when a long ident is not required as the weather presenter acts as a continuity announcer at the end of the forecast announcing the next show.

In February 2021, TG4 launched a set of six new idents with a strong focus on Irish folklore with CGI and 4D elements to the designs, these were produced between TG4 and Red Bee Creative. The idents continue to use TG4's signature theme tune.

=== Logos ===
1999-2003

2003-2012

== List of TG4 Idents ==
- 1996:
  - Just the launch of the logo
- 1999:
1. Messing in the background
2. Playing
- 2004:
1. Fairy
2. Laundry
3. Bridge
4. Cars
5. Wrestling
- 2012:
1. Robo the Pink Creature
2. Swan
3. Baling Bales
- 2021:
1. Road
2. Farmer

== Northern Ireland ==
TG4 was originally only available in Northern Ireland via 'overspill' of the terrestrial signal from the Republic of Ireland. In the 1998 Belfast Agreement there was provision for TG4 (then still known as TnaG) to be made available in Northern Ireland, along with increased recognition of the Irish language. Similarly, while TG4, along with the Republic of Ireland's other terrestrial channels, is carried on Sky Ireland there, it was not available to Sky subscribers in Northern Ireland until 18 April 2005 or on Virgin Media NI until February 2007.

In March 2005, TG4 began broadcasting from the Divis transmitter near Belfast, as a result of agreement between the Department of Foreign Affairs and the Northern Ireland Office. However, because of overcrowding on the frequency bands, only a low power signal can be transmitted and reception was still unavailable in many areas, even in parts of Belfast. The channel was, however, available on cable, digital terrestrial television (Freeview) and on to Sky satellite subscribers.

On 1 February 2010, the Ireland's Minister for Communications Eamon Ryan signed an agreement with the UK's Ben Bradshaw. This agreement enabled viewers within Northern Ireland to watch RTÉ One, RTÉ Two and TG4 on a free-to-air basis as of 2012.

The agreement between both jurisdictions initially also guaranteed viewers within the Republic would be able to view BBC One Northern Ireland and BBC Two Northern Ireland on the Republic's free-to-air service Saorview. A cross-border initiative has always been on the agenda for the Green Party in Ireland. However, it was later confirmed BBC Northern Ireland services will not be made available in the Republic and would be made available on a 'paid for' basis. As of 2025, BBC Northern Ireland services are still unavailable on Saorview.

== Main TG4 analogue UHF transmitters ==
Before Ireland completed its digital switchover in 2012, these transmitters were used for broadcasting the analogue version of TG4. These transmitters are now used to broadcast free-to-view channels via an aerial and a set-top box, such as with the Saorview and Freeview service.

Channel	Location
23	Mount Leinster
31	Mullaghanish
33	Holywell Hill
50	Cairn Hill
55	Three Rock
59	Divis (Belfast)
59	Kippure
63	Spur Hill
63	Truskmore
68	Clermont Carn
68	Maghera

== See also ==
- List of Irish television channels
- RTÉ Raidió na Gaeltachta
- World Indigenous Television Broadcasters Network
- S4C
- BBC Alba
- Celtic Media Festival
- List of Celtic-language media
- Whakaata Māori (Māori Television)
- Canadian Aboriginal Peoples Television Network
- Te Reo (TV channel)
- NRK Sámi Radio
- SABC
- TITV
- PTS
- NITV
