= A Tear and a Smile / Strong in the Sun =

A Tear and a Smile Strong in the Sun

Compilation album by Tír na nÓg
- Released: 7 December 2004
- Recorded: 1972–August 1973
- Genre: Folk
- Length: 74:29
- Language: English
- Label: Beat Goes On
- Producer: Tony Cox; Matthew Fisher

Tír na nÓg chronology
Spotlight (2001)	A Tear and a Smile Strong in the Sun (2004)	Live at Sirius (2010)

Professional ratings
Review scores
Source	Rating
Allmusic	4/5 stars

A Tear and a Smile Strong in the Sun is a compilation album by Irish band Tír na nÓg. It was released on December 7, 2004 by BGO Records and contains the remasters of their two last studio albums from 1972 and 1973: the United Kingdom version of A Tear and a Smile, and Strong in the Sun.

== Track listing ==
1. "Come And See The Show" (Sonny Condell) – 3:20
2. "Down Day" (Condell) – 5:51
3. "When I Came Down" (Leo O'Kelly) – 4:36
4. "The Same Thing Happening" (O'Kelly) – 4:51
5. "Bluebottle Stew" (Condell) – 2:28
6. "So Freely" (O'Kelly) – 3:40
7. "Hemisphere" (Condell) – 2:20
8. "Lady Ocean" (O'Kelly) – 4:37
9. "Goodbye My Love" (O'Kelly) – 4:23
10. "Two White Horses" (Condell) – 2:40
11. "Free Ride" (Nick Drake) – 3:04
12. "Whitestone Bridge" (Condell) – 4:12
13. "Teesside" (Condell) – 3:51
14. "Cinema" (O'Kelly) – 4:38
15. "Strong In The Sun" (O'Kelly) – 3:38
16. "The Wind Was High" (O'Kelly) – 3:19
17. "In The Morning" (Condell) – 3:22
18. "Love Lost" (O'Kelly) – 3:19
19. "Most magical" (Condell) – 3:46
20. "Fall Of Day" (Condell) – 2:34

== Personnel ==
=== A Tear and a Smile ===
- Sonny Condell – vocals, guitar, clavinette, percussion
- Leo O'Kelly – vocals, guitar
- Larry Steele – bass
- Barry de Souza – drums
- Paul Tregurtha – engineering
- Nick Harrison – arranger
- Tony Cox – production

=== Strong in the Sun ===
- Sonny Condell – vocals, acoustic guitar, electric guitar, pottery drums, jaw harp
- Leo O'Kelly – vocals, acoustic guitar, electric lead guitar, dulcimer, violin
- Matthew Fisher – keyboards, production
- Geoff Emerick – engineering

==== Additional personnel ====
- Brian Odgers, Dave Markee, Jim Ryan – bass
- Barry de Souza, Ace Follington, Jeff Jones – drums

== Release history ==
Region	Date	Label	Format	Catalog
United Kingdom	2004	BGO Records	remastered CD	BGOCD653
