= The Fruitsmelling Shop =

Single by Sonny Condell & Scullion

from the album Scullion
- B-side: "Down in the City"
- Released: 1979
- Recorded: "The Fruitsmelling Shop": Windmill Studios, Dublin; "Down in the City": January 1977, Lombard Sound, Dublin
- Genre: Folk
- Length: 3:02
- Label: Mulligan
- Songwriter: Sonny Condell
- Producers: P.J. Curtis ("The Fruitsmelling Shop"); Shaun Davey ("Down in the City")

Sonny Condell singles chronology
"Down in the City" (1977)	"The Fruitsmelling Shop" (1979)	"Down in the City" (1997)

Scullion singles chronology
"The Cat She Went a Hunting" (1979)	"The Fruitsmelling Shop" (1979)	"Tension" (1980)

Audio sample
- The Fruitsmelling Shop: file; help

"The Fruitsmelling Shop" is a song by Irish musician Sonny Condell with band Scullion. It was released in 1979 as a single by Mulligan Music and distributed by Polygram Records, with "Down in the City" as its B-side. Although single is introduced as a solo work on its front sleeve, "The Fruitsmelling Shop" comes actually from the eponymous first Scullion album, while "Down in the City" is taken from the first Condell's solo album, Camouflage, published in 1977.
The lyrics are excerpted from the 10th episode, "The Wandering Rocks", of the James Joyce's Ulysses novel.

== Format and track listing ==
All tracks are written by Sonny Condell.

Ireland stereo 7" single (LUNS 753)
No.	Title	Length
1.	"The Fruitsmelling Shop"	3:02
2.	"Down in the City"	4:37

== Personnel ==
=== "The Fruitsmelling Shop" ===
Scullion

- Sonny Condell – vocals, piano, saxophone
- Greg Boland – backing vocals, acoustic guitar
- Philip King – backing vocals

Additional musicians

- Peter Browne – uilleann pipes
- Rita Connolly – vocals

Production

- P.J. Curtis – production
- Philip Begley – engineering
- Paul Thomas, Steve Morris – engineering assistants

=== "Down in the City" ===
- Sonny Condell – acoustic guitar, vocals
- Jolyon Jackson – cello
- Greg Boland – acoustic guitar
- Fran Breen – percussion
- Ciarán Brennan – double bass

Production

- Shaun Davey – production
- Brian Materson – engineering
