= Ray Dolan =

- Born: Dublin, Ireland
- Genres: folk
- Occupations: Musician, songwriter, singer
- Instruments: vocals, guitar
- Years active: 1960s – 1970s
- Label: EMI

Ray Dolan is an Irish singer-songwriter and guitarist. He began his career in the early 1970 by playing folk clubs in Dublin with James Connolly as a duo, contributing to the success of the Universal Folk Centre at Parnell Square. In 1973, they were involved in the five-member band Heir. The two musicians also participated in the final Anne Byrne album Come by the Hills, published in 1974, and containing a cover of the Dolan's song "Constantly Changing". He went solo that year, and recorded an album on EMI label in 1975, Restless Night, but he remains mainly known for the Tír na nÓg version of his song "Hey Friend" from their eponymous album released by Chrysalis Records in 1971. The Irish duo contributed to his solo album with Leo O'Kelly as producer, and among other guests like Philip King, future Scullion founder with Sonny Condell. The same year, he did a brief screen appearance in an episode of the BBC Two documentary series The Camera & The Song, dedicated to O'Kelly and Condell.

== Discography ==
- Restless Night (1975)

== Television ==
- The Camera & the Song – "The Irish" (1975) – himself

== Songs ==
- "Hey Friend" – recorded by Tír na nÓg – Tír na nÓg (1971)
- "Constantly Changing" – recorded by Anne Byrne – Come by the Hills (1974)

== Guest appearances ==
- Anne Byrne – Come by the Hills (1974)
