= I'm Happy to Be (On This Mountain) =

Tír na nÓg song

"I'm Happy To Be (On This Mountain)"
- Original "I'm Happy To Be (On This Mountain)" 45 (UK issue)

Single by Tír na nÓg
- B-side: "Let My Love Grow"
- Released: October 2, 1970
- Recorded: 1970
- Genre: Folk
- Length: 2:16
- Label: Chrysalis
- Songwriter(s): Sonny Condell
- Producer(s): Mike Batt

Tír na nÓg singles chronology
"I'm Happy To Be (On This Mountain)" (1970)	"The Lady I Love" (1972)

Alternative cover
- German cover.

Audio sample
- I'm Happy To Be (On This Mountain): file; help

"I'm Happy To Be (On This Mountain)" is the first single by Irish band Tír na nÓg. It was released on October 2, 1970 by Chrysalis Records and distributed by Island Records on 7" vinyl with "Let My Love Grow" as its B-side. The German release of the single has an Island logo on a pink label although the Chrysalis logo also appears.

== Format and track listing ==
UK stereo 7" single (WIP 6090)

1. "I'm Happy To Be (On This Mountain)" (Sonny Condell) – 2:16
2. "Let My Love Grow" (Condell) – 3:22

Germany 7" stereo single (6014 032)

1. "I'm Happy To Be (On This Mountain)" (Condell) – 2:16
2. "Let My Love Grow" (Condell) – 3:22

== Personnel ==
- Sonny Condell - vocals, guitar
- Leo O'Kelly - vocals, guitar
