= Cooler at the Edge =

- Original cover designed by Sonny Condell & Big Jon Gurman

EP by Scullion
- Released: 1989
- Recorded: Sulàn Studios, Ballyvourney, County Cork
- Genre: Folk
- Length: 16:48
- Language: English
- Label: Gravepine Records
- Producer: Dónal Lunny

Scullion chronology
Spin (1985)	Cooler at the Edge (1989)	Ghosts & Heroes (1992)

Cooler at the Edge is the debut EP by Irish band Scullion and was released in 1989 on compact cassette by Gravepine Records, intended as a promotion EP with four tracks announced as taken from their forthcoming album at the time, the 1992 compilation Ghosts & Heroes, although they were not issued on this release. They were re-published on the 2001 retrospective album Eyelids Into Snow - A Collection. The EP was produced by Dónal Lunny.

== Compact cassette track listing ==
All tracks are written by Sonny Condell except where noted

Stereo compact cassette GRAPE SCCS 701
No.	Title	Writer(s)	Length
1.	"Cooler at the Edge"		4:47
2.	"Ghosts & Heroes"	Philip King, Nuala O'Connor, Sonny Condell	4:22
3.	"Betty & Bogey"		4:03
4.	"Dixie" (arranged by Scullion)		3:36
Total length:			16:48

== Personnel ==
Scullion

- Sonny Condell – acoustic guitar on "Betty & Bogey", vocals on tracks 1, 2 and 3, keyboards on tracks 1, 2 and 3, percussions on "Ghosts & Heroes", guitars
- Philip King – vocals on "Cooler at the Edge" and "Ghosts & Heroes", harmonica on tracks 1, 3 and 4
- Robbie Overson – acoustic guitar on "Cooler at the Edge" and "Betty & Bogey", electric guitar on "Betty & Bogey", vocals, guitars

Production

- Dónal Lunny – production

== Release history ==
Region	Date	Label	Format	Catalog
Ireland, United Kingdom	1989	Gravepine Records	stereo compact cassette	GRAPE SCCS 701
