= Strong in the Sun (song) =

"Strong In The Sun"
- Original "Strong In The Sun" 45 (UK issue). A second UK press with a different green label exists: the letter "A" is not present on the A-side.

Single by Tír na nÓg

from the album Strong in the Sun
- B-side: "The Mountain and I"
- Released: September 7, 1973
- Recorded: 1973
- Genre: Folk
- Label: Chrysalis
- Songwriter(s): Leo O'Kelly
- Producer(s): Matthew Fisher

Tír na nÓg singles chronology
"Bluebottle Stew" (1972)	"Strong In The Sun" (1973)	"Love Is Like a Violin" (1985)

Audio sample
- Strong In The Sun: file; help

"Strong in the Sun" is a song by Irish band Tír na nÓg written by Leo O'Kelly. It was released on September 7, 1973, by Chrysalis Records as a single, with "The Mountain and I" as its B-side. It was later released on the studio album of the same name.

== Format and track listing ==
UK 7" single (CHS 2016)

1. "Strong in the Sun" (Leo O'Kelly)
2. "The Mountain and I" (Sonny Condell)

== Personnel ==
- Sonny Condell - vocals, guitar
- Leo O'Kelly - vocals, guitar
