= The Children of Lir =

Children of Lir or The Children of Lir may refer to:

- The Fate of the Children of Lir, an Irish legend

== Music ==
- The Children of Lir, a cantata in the Irish language for orchestra, choir and soloists by Patrick Cassidy
- Children of Lir, a song on the album Folk-Lore by folk metal-band Cruachan
- The Children of Lir, symphonic poem composed by Hamilton Harty
- The Children of Lir, a suite for orchestra, with narrator, by Robert Lamb
- The Children of Lir, ballet composed by Adela Maddison
- The Children of Lir (Loudest Whisper album) 1974, credited to Brian O'Reilly and featuring Donovan

== Other uses ==
- The Children of Lir, sculpture in Dublin's Garden of Remembrance by Oisín Kelly
