= Love Is Like a Violin =

- Original cover designed and photographed by David Donohue

Single by Tír na nÓg
- B-side: "Daisy Lady"
- Released: April 1985
- Recorded: 1985 at The Mint, Dublin
- Genre: Folk
- Label: Tír na nÓg
- Songwriter(s): Leo O'Kelly
- Producer(s): Tír na nÓg

Tír na nÓg singles chronology
"Strong in the Sun" (1973)	"Love Is Like a Violin" (1985)

Audio sample
- Love Is Like a Violin: file; help

"Love Is Like a Violin" is a song by Irish band Tír na nÓg. It was released in early April 1985 as a single, with a new version of "Daisy Lady" as its B-side to coincide with a 14-date Irish tour after the reunification of the band. The tour ended on April 21 at the Olympia Theatre in Dublin.

== Format and track listing ==
Ireland stereo 7" single (TIR 1)

1. "Love Is Like a Violin" (Leo O'Kelly)
2. "Daisy Lady" (O'Kelly)

== Personnel ==
- Sonny Condell - vocals, guitar
- Leo O'Kelly - vocals, guitar
- Shay Fitz - engineering
