= Freddie White =

Irish singer-songwriter (born 1951)

- Born: Cobh, County Cork, Ireland
- Genres: Folk, contemporary, jazz
- Occupations: Musician, songwriter
- Instruments: Guitar, vocals, mandolin
- Years active: 1960s–present
- Labels: Mulligan Records, Tara Records, Little Don Records
- Formerly of: Scullion; The Fake; The Freddie White Band
- Website: www.freddiewhite.com

Freddie White (born September 1951 in Cobh, Ireland) is an Irish singer-songwriter.

== Biography ==
Born in Cobh, County Cork, Ireland into a musical family, by the age of thirteen White was playing in school bands and by seventeen playing professionally.

He went to London in 1970, where during his two-year stay, he worked on his unique style of singing and guitar accompaniment.

Together with Philip King and Sonny Condell in 1974 he formed a popular folk rock/jazz fusion group that started out as an occasional band called The Sunday Night Band. The following year, after White had left the band, it morphed into Scullion. In 1977 he formed The Fake and the following year he formed The Freddie White Band.

During 1978 White toured as the opening act for the Irish band Clannad with their producer/sound manager Nicky Ryan recording those gigs, and providing selections to compile into White's first album Recorded Live on Tour 1978.

On 15 March 1979 he opened the concert for Eric Clapton and his band (including Albert Lee), in the Downtown Club in Dundalk.

In 1992 White emigrated to Boston, US where he remained for twelve years, returning to Ireland in 2004. After seven years back home in Ireland, White relocated to Sydney Australia in March 2011 with his girlfriend, Trish Hickey; they married in Sydney in June 2013. The couple relocated to New York City in December 2016 for one year. In January 2018, they moved back to Cobh, Ireland.

White has been touring internationally since the 1980s, solo as well as with fellow musicians. He performs interpretations of work of some of his favorite performers, such as Randy Newman (nine covers recorded), John Hiatt (nine covers recorded), Tom Waits and Guy Clark as well as some jazz standards and his own compositions.

White's 1999 album My Country did not include any covers. It featured lyrics of White's brother-in-law, the poet Don O'Sullivan (1949–1986), put to music, co-written by White with his then wife, Ann O'Sullivan (Don O'Sullivan's sister).

== Discography ==
- Recorded Live on Tour 1978 (Mulligan Records, 1979)
- Do You Do (Mulligan Records, 1981)
- Long Distance Runner (Tara Records, 1985)
- Have A Nice Day (Tara Records, 1987) 4-track 12" EP
- Close To You (Lime Records/EMI Records (Ireland), 1991)
- Straight Up (Little Don Records, 1994) – Live: The Lobby, Cork and An Béal Bocht, Dublin
- My Country (Little Don Records, 1999)
- Lost And Found (Little Don Records, 2002) – compilation: the first two albums – Recorded Live On Tour 1978 and Do You Do
- Four Days In May (Little Don Records, 2004)
- Stormy Lullaby (Little Don Records, 2008)
- Here With You (Little Don Records, 2012) – Freddie White & Trish Hickey
- Better Days (Little Don Records, 2014)
- Prodigal Songs (Little Don Records, 2016)
- One Heart Beating (Little Don Records, 2018)
- The Accidental Album (Freddie White Records, 2024) - live from various gigs over the years

Note: The above albums are available on CD, with the exception of Long Distance Runner the Have A Nice Day EP and The Accidental Album.
