= Crubeen =

Crubeen may refer to:

- Crubeen (band), a 1970s Irish folk band from Newry, County Down, Northern Ireland
- Crubeen, County Laois, a townland in Ireland
- Crubeens, an Irish food made of boiled pigs' feet
