= Scullion =

Scullion may refer to:

- The Irish surname derived from 'Ó Scolláin' meaning 'descendant of the/a scholar'
- a servant from the lower classes
  - a male performing the duties of a scullery maid

== Music ==
- Scullion (group), an Irish folk rock band
- Scullion (album)

== People with the surname ==
- Brooke Scullion (born 1999), Irish singer
- Liam Scullion (born 2001), Scottish footballer
- Michelle Scullion (born 1957), New Zealand musician and composer
- Nigel Scullion, Australian politician
- Stephen Scullion, Northern Irish runner
- Tony Scullion, Irish Gaelic footballer

== See also ==
- Skullion - the main character in the novels Porterhouse Blue and Grantchester Grind
