= The Camera & the Song =

Compilation album by Various Artists
- Released: 1975
- Genre: Folk
- Language: English
- Label: Super Beeb Records
- Compiler: John Bird

The Camera & the Song is a compilation album composed of songs by various folk bands and artists like Fivepenny Piece or Tír na nÓg from the BBC Two television series The Camera & the Song. The songs were broadcast in the early 1970s and this LP released in 1975.

== Track listing ==
=== Side One ===
1. "Mountain Climber" (John Meeks, Colin Radcliffe) - Fivepenny Piece
2. "Boat Song" (Leo O'Kelly) - Tír na nÓg, credited to Leo O'Kelly & Sonny Condell
3. "Paradise Flats" (Alex Glasgow) - Alex Glasgow
4. "Michael in the Garden" (Ralph McTell) - Ralph McTell
5. "The Apprentice's Song" (Ian Campbell) - The Ian Campbell Folk Group
6. "Duw It's Hard" (Max Boyce) - Max Boyce

=== Side Two ===
1. "Backbreaker" (John Gorman, Roger McGough, Neil Innes, Andy Roberts, Dave Richards, John Megginson) - Grimms
2. "Two White Horses" (Sonny Condell) - Tír na nÓg, credited to Leo O'Kelly & Sonny Condell
3. "All in a Day" (Glasgow) - Alex Glasgow
4. "For My Father" (Harvey Andrews) - Harvey Andrews
5. "Country Bus" (Jake Thackray) - Jake Thackray
6. "Blackpool" (Jeremy Taylor) - Jeremy Taylor

== Release history ==
Region	Date	Label	Format	Catalog
United Kingdom	1975	Super Beeb Records	stereo LP	BELP 006
