= Ann Mortifee =

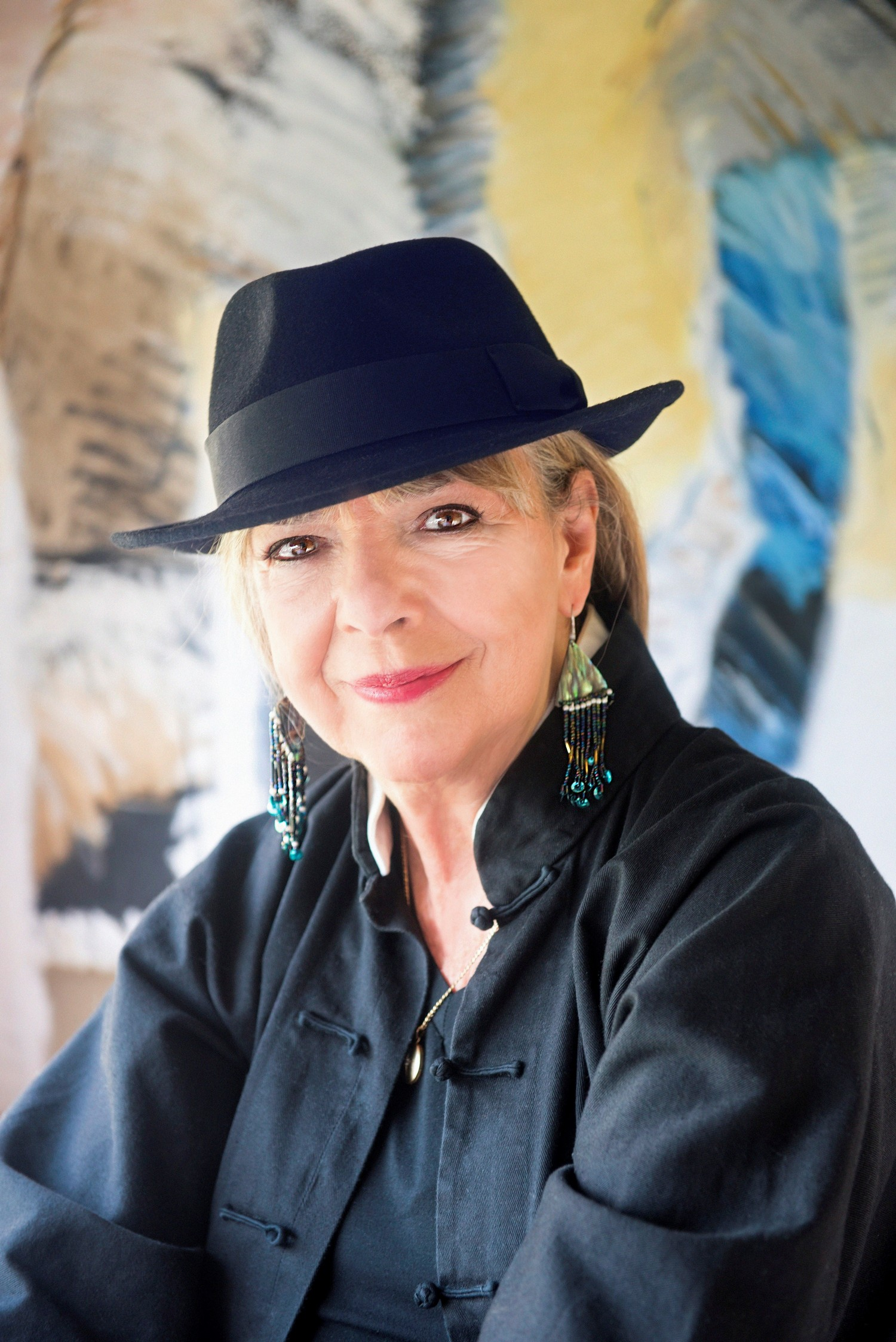
- Ann Mortifee in her studio, Vancouver BC, 2016

Background information
- Born: 30 November 1947 (age 78); Durban, South Africa
- Occupations: Singer, composer, librettist, author
- Instruments: Voice, guitar, piano
- Labels: EMI, Jabula, Eskova
- Website: annmortifee.com

Ann Mortifee, CM (born 30 November 1947) is a Canadian singer, composer and librettist, author, storyteller, and keynote speaker. Her music blends folk, musical theatre, pop, sacred and world music. She is a member of the Order of Canada, one of the highest honours bestowed on civilians by the Government of Canada.

== Early years ==
Born in Durban, South Africa, Mortifee lived in the province of Natal until the age of 10. Her father, who was deeply opposed to the country's racist apartheid regime, immigrated to Canada with his wife and children and settled in Vancouver, British Columbia.

== Family ==
She was married to the late Paul Horn, a jazz flutist and one of the early New Age musicians. Her younger sister, Jane Mortifee, also an artist, has on occasion performed onstage with Mortifee and on her albums.

== Awards ==
Mortifee has received national and international distinctions and awards for her albums, concerts, musicals, scores for ballet, film, opera, and TV, as well as her book, In Love with the Mystery. She also facilitates arts and consciousness workshops, and has co-founded two foundations – one for social innovation and one for forestry conservation.

== Discography ==
- 1973: The Ecstasy of Rita Joe – the cast recording from the Royal Winnipeg Ballet's contemporary dance production
- 1975: Baptism – her first solo album
- 1980: Journey to Kairos – based on Mortifee's one-woman show of the same name and award-winning TV special
- 1982: Reflections on Crooked Walking – the first full-length musical created and written by Mortifee
- 1983: Born to Live – co-written with Michel Legrand
- 1984: Bright Encounter
- 1985: Jacques Brel Lives – from the cast reunion of the original Arts Club Vancouver production of Jacques Brel is Alive and Well and Living in Paris
- 1985: Christmas Connection – with the Royal Philharmonic Orchestra and the Chicago Synthesizer-Rhythm Ensemble
- 1991: Serenade at the Doorway
- 1994: Healing Journey
- 2005: Into the Heart of the Sangoma
- 2010: In Love with the Mystery – the musical accompaniment (with Paul Horn) to Mortifee's book In Love with the Mystery

== Selected awards and recognition ==
- 1967: Appeared as The Singer and composed the musical score (with Willie Dunn) for the world premiere of George Ryga's play The Ecstasy of Rita Joe at the Vancouver Playhouse Theatre
- 1975: Honorable Mention, Best Original Music, for the documentary Great Grand Mother – Alberta Film and TV Festival
- 1976: Featured composer/artist on the BBC Two TV series The Camera and the Song
- 1980: TV Ontario Special, Journey to Kairos, Ann's one-woman show, received the Worldfest-Houston International Film Festival Grand Prix Award
- 1981: West Coast Music Award – Best Female Vocalist
- 1982: Genie Award nomination, Best Original Song ("Gypsy Born"), from the movie Surfacing
- 1984: Juno Award nominations: Most Promising Female Vocalist of the Year, Best Children's Album (Reflections on Crooked Walking)
- 1986: Bach's Magnificat CTV special (with Moe Koffman and Bobby McFerrin) – Golden Sheaf Award
- 1991: Juno Award nomination, Most Promising Female Vocalist of the Year
- 1991: Appointed a Member of the Order of Canada
- 1992: Inducted into BC Entertainment Hall of Fame
- 1992: YWCA Woman of Distinction Award, Arts and Culture
- 1994: Featured soloist, 1994 Commonwealth Games Closing Ceremony
- 2000: Healing Journey project featured on the CBC Man Alive series
- 2002: Queen Elizabeth II Golden Jubilee Medal for outstanding and exemplary contributions to the community and Canada
- 2007: Narrator, Emmy Award-winning documentary Bhutan: Taking the Middle Road to Happiness
- 2011: Narrator, Emmy Award-nominated documentary When the Mountain Calls
- 2012: Queen Elizabeth II Diamond Jubilee Medal for service to Canada
