= All in a Day (disambiguation) =

All in a Day is a children's picture book by Mitsumasa Anno.

All in a Day may also refer to:

- All in a Day (radio show), a Canadian radio program on CBC Radio One
- "All in a Day", a song by Alex Glasgow from The Camera & the Song
- "All in a Day", a song by Ashley Roberts from Butterfly Effect
- "All in a Day", a song by Boom Boom Satellites from To the Loveless
- "All in a Day", a song by the Butterfield Blues Band from Keep On Moving
- "All in a Day", a song by the Corrs from In Blue
- "All in a Day", a song by Joe Strummer & the Mescaleros from Streetcore
- "All in a Day", a song by John Michael Montgomery from Time Flies
- "All in a Day", a song by Little Brother from May the Lord Watch
- "All in a Day", a song by Paddy Casey from Living
- "All in a Day", a song by Berner
- All in a Day, a book by Cynthia Rylant
