= Balance and Control =

- Photo by Bob Hobby.

Studio album by Scullion
- Released: 1980
- Recorded: Keystone Studios, Dublin
- Genre: Folk
- Length: 35:01
- Language: English
- Label: WEA
- Producer: John Martyn

Scullion chronology
Scullion (1979)	Balance and Control (1980)	White Side of Night (1983)

Singles from Balance and Control
- 1. "Promo Single for Balance and Control" Released: 1980; 2. "Tension" Released: 1980; 3. "Eyelids Into Snow" Released: 1980; 4. "Back at Two" Released: 1981

Professional ratings
Review scores
Source	Rating
Hot Press	8/12 stars

Balance and Control is the second studio album by Irish band Scullion. It was released in 1980 by WEA. The album was produced by John Martyn.

== Track listing ==
All tracks are written by Sonny Condell except where noted.

Side one
No.	Title	Lyrics	Music	Length
1.	"Jump"			3:11
2.	"Coffee Talk"			3:21
3.	"Fear"	Philip King	King, Greg Boland	2:30
4.	"Avoid My Eyes"			3:04
5.	"Eyelids Into Snow"			5:11
Total length:				17:17

Side two
No.	Title	Lyrics	Music	Length
1.	"Tension"			2:57
2.	"18"	King	King, Condell	5:41
3.	"Back At Two"	n/a	Boland	3:19
4.	"Circumstances"			2:49
5.	"Yellow Train"			2:58
Total length:				17:44

== Personnel ==
- Philip King – vocals
- Sonny Condell – vocals, guitar
- Greg Boland – acoustic and electric guitar

=== Additional personnel ===
- Tommy Moore – bass
- Jolyon Jackson – Fender Rhodes, polymoog
- Andrew Boland – polymoog
- Paul McAteer – drums

== Release history ==
Region	Date	Label	Format	Catalog
Ireland	1980	WEA	stereo LP	K 58205
