= Restless Night =

Restless Night or Restless Nights may refer to:

== Film ==
- Restless Night (1958)

== Literature ==
- Unruhige Nacht (Restless Night), 1950 story by Albrecht Goes
- Restless Night 1990 novel by Charlotte Hughes

== Music ==
=== Albums ===
- Restless Night (Ray Dolan album) 1975
- Restless Night, 1971 debut album of Octopus (English band)
- Restless Night, Julianna Raye 2002
- Restless Nights (Karla Bonoff album) 1979

=== Songs ===
- "Restless Night", The Incredible String Band from Earthspan
- "Restless Night" (לילה לא שקט, Layla Lo Shaket) hit song by Shlomo Artzi
- "Restless Night", from Dragon Ball Z 3 Original Soundtrack
- "Restless Nights", by Scorpions from the album Crazy World
- "Restless Nights", by Bruce Springsteen from Tracks (Bruce Springsteen album)
- "Restless Nights", by Lalo Schifrin composed by Lalo Schifrin 1983 The Osterman Weekend
- "Restless Nights", by Memphis Slim
- "Restless Nights", by Karla Bonoff composed by Karla Bonoff
