= Weoley =

Weoley may refer to:

- Weoley Castle, a residential suburban district of the City of Birmingham, England.
- Weoley Castle (house), a ruined moated and fortified medieval manor house, which gave its name to the district of Weoley Castle, Birmingham, England.
- Weoley (ward), a local council electoral ward covering the district of Weoley Castle as well as neighbouring areas in Birmingham, England.
- Weoley Park, a former medieval manorial hunting park, which previously surrounded the fortified medieval manor house of Weoley Castle.
- Manor of Weoley, a former medieval feudal manor, originally in north Worcestershire, England.
- Richard Weoley, Master of the Worshipful Company of Founders in 1631 and 1640.
- The Weoley Cup, a 15th-century Venetian glass goblet presented to the Founders' Company by its former Master, Richard Weoley.

== See also ==
- Weeley, a small village in Tendring, East Essex, England
- Weeley Festival, a British rock festival that took place in 1971 near the village of Weeley
