= The Dark Dance =

Studio album by Tír na nÓg
- Released: May 24, 2015
- Genre: Folk
- Label: Tír na nÓg Records
- Producer: Tír na nÓg

Tír na nÓg chronology
Live at Sirius (2010)	The Dark Dance (2015)

The Dark Dance is the fourth album by Irish band Tír na nÓg. It is their first new album of original material in 42 years following the release of Strong in the Sun in 1973. The album was released on May 24, 2015 on the band's own label. An LP version was planned to be released during Summer 2017 on Mega Dodo Records.

== Track listing ==
No.	Title	Writer(s)	Length
1.	"You in Yellow"	Sonny Condell
2.	"I Have Known Love"	Eileen Lewellen, Simeon, Taylor
3.	"The Angelus"	Condell
4.	"I Pick Up Birds at Funerals"	Leo O'Kelly
5.	"Ricochet"	O'Kelly
6.	"Andria"	Condell
7.	"Sympathetic Love"	O'Kelly
8.	"The Gangway"
9.	"Time Is Gone"
10.	"The Dark Dance"

== Personnel ==
Tír na nÓg

- Sonny Condell – vocals, guitar, bongos, instruments
- Leo O'Kelly – vocals, guitar, bongos, instruments

Additional musician

- Garvan Gallagher – bass (track 7, 9)

== Release history ==
Region	Date	Label	Format	Catalog
Ireland	May 24, 2015	Tír na nÓg Records	CD	TNN 002
