= Songs of the Irish People =

- Original cover designed by Charlie McKeown

Studio album by The Longkesh Ramblers
- Released: 1974
- Recorded: 1974
- Genre: Irish traditional music
- Length: 37:47
- Label: Clanrye Records

The Longkesh Ramblers chronology
| Songs of the Irish People (1974) | Crubeen; Eagle's Whistle EMI Ireland (1976) |

The Longkesh Ramblers, later Crubeen, was a 1970s Irish folk band from Newry, County Down, Northern Ireland. They recorded and produced all their material in Dublin. Clanrye Records was a self made record label.

== Background ==
The Longkesh Ramblers' debut Album was called Songs of the Irish People.

== Personnel ==
- Billy Fegan: tin whistle, Harmonica and Vocal
- Eddie Ruddy: Flute, Whistle, and Concertina
- Barney Gribben: Banjo, mandolin, Concertina and Harmonica
- Tommy Hollywood: Guitar, mandolin and Vocal
- Rory O'Connor: Guitar and Vocal
- Benny McKay: bodhran and Vocal

== Songs of the Irish People Track listing 1974 ==
Side one
| No. | Title | Length |
|---|---|---|
| 1. | "Show Me the Man" | 2:31 |
| 2. | "Sklbbereen" | 5:42 |
| 3. | "O'Neills March" | 2:25 |
| 4. | "An Buinnean Bui" | 4:00 |
| 5. | "Death of Staker Wallace" | 2:57 |
| 6. | "Stranger from the City" | 2:44 |

Side two
| No. | Title | Length |
|---|---|---|
| 1. | "Come out ye Black and Tans" | 3:25 |
| 2. | "My Home Town" | 3:01 |
| 3. | "Si beag Si mhor" | 3:07 |
| 4. | "Valley of Knockanure" | 3:37 |
| 5. | "The Blackbird" | 3:48 |
| 6. | "Song of the Dawn" | 2:30 |
| Total length: | | 37:47 |

== Release history ==
| Region | Date | Label | Format | Catalog |
|---|---|---|---|---|
| Ireland | 1974 | Clanrye Records | mono LP | CLP 001 |
