= My Way Home =

My Way Home or On My Way Home may refer to:

- My Way Home (1965 film), a film by Hungarian filmmaker Miklós Jancsó
- My Way Home (1978 film), the third in a trilogy of autobiographical films by Scottish filmmaker Bill Douglas
- "My Way Home" (Scrubs), the 100th episode of the American situation comedy Scrubs
- "On My Way Home" (song), a song by Enya
- "My Way Home", a song by Alex Lloyd from Black the Sun
- "My Way Home", a song by Jessica Simpson from In This Skin
- "My Way Home", a song by Kanye West from Late Registration
- "My Way Home", a song by Kirsty MacColl from Electric Landlady
- "On My Way Home", a song by Leo O'Kelly from Glare
- "My Way Home", a song by Raffi from The Corner Grocery Store

== See also ==
- My Own Way Home, an album by Beth
