= Loudest Whisper =

Irish folk rock/progressive folk group

- Origin: Fermoy, Ireland
- Genres: Folk rock, progressive folk
- Years active: 1970–present
- Labels: Polydor, Fiona
- Members: Brian O'Reilly; Paud O'Reilly; Oran O'Reilly
- Past members: Michael Clancy; John Aherne; Jimmy Cotter; Brendan Neligan; Ron Kavanagh; Geraldine Dorgan; Bernadette Bowes
- Website: www.loudestwhisper.com

Loudest Whisper are an Irish folk rock/progressive folk group formed in the early 1970s and led by songwriter and guitarist Brian O'Reilly. They are best known for their 1974 debut album, The Children of Lir, a folk opera based on the Irish legend of the same name. The original LP release of the album became one of the most sought after records in Ireland, and ranks among the top 100 rarest records in the world.

Loudest Whisper made several albums and over a dozen singles. The group became dormant in the mid-1980s, but reformed in the mid-1990s with a revival of The Children of Lir. They released a new album in 2004.

== History ==
Loudest Whisper began in Fermoy, Ireland in the early 1960s as The Wizards, a cover band consisting of Brian O'Reilly (guitar, vocals), Michael Clancy (guitar, vocals), John Aherne (bass guitar, vocals) and Jimmy Cotter (drums, vocals). The Wizards played Beatles, Hollies and Spencer Davis songs, before progressing into "heavier blues territory" when Jimi Hendrix and Cream appeared. In the early 1970s, the band changed their name to "Loudest Whisper", chosen to reflect both sides of their music, "the folky and the heavy". Soon after, several personnel changes took place: Cotter left, and Brendan Neligan (vocals), Ron Kavanagh (guitar, vocals) and Brian O'Reilly's brother Paud O'Reilly (drums) joined.

Brian O'Reilly was also a songwriter, influenced by American folk-rock groups like The Lovin' Spoonful and The Mamas & the Papas, but in the early 1970s he began exploring Irish folklore. O'Reilly was particularly interested in the Children of Lir, and in 1972 he composed a Celtic musical based on the Irish legend. The Children of Lir developed into a stage production, and it premiered in Fermoy on 7 January 1973, with Kavanagh performing in the lead role. The musical generated "a lot of regional attention" and Ireland's national broadcaster, RTÉ recorded a ten-minute feature, which it aired on prime time. This exposure resulted in the production moving to other cities, and the Irish division of Polydor Records signing a record deal with Loudest Whisper. Early in 1974 the group recorded their debut album, The Children of Lir, a studio adaption of the musical with producer Leo O'Kelly from Tír na nÓg. The album was, however, rejected by Polydor in the UK and ended up being released in Ireland only in a limited edition of about 500 copies.

Kavanagh left Loudest Whisper during the recording of The Children of Lir, and Neligan left after the album was released. O'Reilly then wrote a second musical, Perseus, based on the Greek legend. For the stage production singer Geraldine Dorgan performed in the main role, and later joined Loudest Whisper as singer/guitarist. She also sang in O'Reilly's third musical, The Maiden of Sorrow in 1975. A live performance of The Maiden of Sorrow was recorded in 1975, but not released until 1995 on CD. Loudest Whisper recorded a number of singles for Polydor Ireland during the mid- and late-1970s, but it was not until 1980 that the label released their second album, Loudest Whisper (later reissued on CD as Loudest Whisper 2), which consisted of some of their singles and new material. Unhappy with Polydor's lack of support, O'Reilly built his own recording studio in Fermoy in 1979 called Fiona. In 1982 the band recorded their third album, Hard Times at Fiona Studio with the addition of a new vocalist, Bernadette Bowes.

In 1985 Dorgan and Bowes left the band, and towards the end of the 1980s, Loudest Whisper began to dissolve. O'Reilly continued to write musicals, and staged Buskin' in Fermoy and Cork, which received "rave reviews". When Riverdance made its appearance in 1994, and proved very successful, Brian O'Reilly decided to restage The Children of Lir, this time with a more "folky and Celtic veneer". It was also recorded and released in 1994 as The Children of Lir, credited to Brian O'Reilly and Donovan. The original 1974 The Children of Lir recording was released in the UK for the first time by Kissing Spell on CD in 1994. In 2008 Sunbeam Records released Magic Carpet, a six-CD box set that included all the group's albums, singles and some of their early demos. The original 1974 LP release of The Children of Lir has become one of the most sought after records in Ireland, and ranks among the top 100 rarest records in the world.

Since the mid-1990s, Loudest Whisper have been performing on and off with different musicians, including as a trio of Brian O'Reilly (guitar, keyboards, vocals), his brother Paud (drums, backing vocals) and Brian's son, Oran (double bass). In 2004 the group released the album, Our World on Fiona Records. and in 2014 they released Blue... Is the Colour on Sunbeam Records

== Discography ==
=== Singles ===
- "William B" / "False Prophets" (1974, 7" vinyl, Polydor Records, Ireland)
- "Come Back Paddy Reilly to Ballyjamesduff" / "Wrong or Right" (1976, 7" vinyl, Polydor Records, Ireland)
- "You and I" / "Lord Have Mercy" (1976, 7" vinyl, Polydor Records, Ireland) IRE No. 4
- "Rock 'n' Roll Child" / "Pied Piper" (1977, 7" vinyl, Polydor Records, Ireland)
- "You and I" / "Satisfaction" (1979, 7" vinyl, Polydor Records, Ireland) IRE No. 15
- "Magic Carpet" / "Tangerine" (1979, 7" vinyl, Polydor Records, Ireland) IRE No. 28
- "Name of the Game (Parts 1 & 2)" (1980, 7" vinyl, Polydor Records, Ireland)
- "Home" / "Wheel of Fortune" (1980, 7" vinyl, Polydor Records, Ireland)
- "William B"/"Fiona" (1981, 7" vinyl, Polydor Records, Ireland)
- "Loudmouth" / "Hemlop's Hammer" (1981, 7" vinyl, Polydor Records, Ireland)
- "Guitar Man" / "In the Dark" (1983, 7" vinyl, Polydor Records, Ireland)
- "Oh Lord Above" / "Poete de la Nature" (1983, 7" vinyl, Fiona Records, Ireland)
- "Marianne" / "505" (1983, 7" vinyl, Fiona Records, Ireland)
- "Hey Marian" / "Daffodil" (1984, 7" vinyl, Fiona Records, Ireland)
- "Old Devil Blues" / "Man Hunter" (1985, 7" vinyl, Ritz Records, UK) – from the musical Buskin' by Brian O'Reilly
- "Johnny (Where Are You Now)" / "Old Devil Blues" (1986, 7" vinyl, Fiona Records, Ireland)
- "Who's Gonna Rock You" / "Petuina" (1986, 7" vinyl, Fiona Records, Ireland)
- "Mean Man" / "Beat of the Drum" (1989, 7" vinyl, Fiona Records, Ireland)

=== Albums ===
- The Children of Lir (1974, LP, Polydor Records, Ireland)
- Loudest Whisper (1980, LP, Polydor Records, Ireland) – reissued on CD in 1995 as Loudest Whisper 2
- Hard Times (1983, LP, Fiona Records, Ireland)
- The Best of Brian O'Reilly & Loudest Whisper (1991, CD, K-Tel Ireland) - A collection of new recordings of songs from across the band's career
- Maiden of Sorrow (1995, CD, Kissing Spell, UK) – live album recorded in 1975
- The Collection (1995, CD & Cassette, Fiona Records, Ireland) – Reissue of 1991 K-Tel album, sponsored by Clonakilty Blackpudding Co.
- Our World (2004, CD, Fiona Records, Ireland)
- Blue... Is the Colour of Time (2014, CD, Sunbeam Records, UK)

=== Compilations ===
- Magic Carpet (2008, 6-CD set, Sunbeam Records, UK) – discs 1–3: first three albums; disc 4: non-album singles 1974–1983; disc 5: non-album singles 1983–1990; disc 6: demos and unreleased recordings 1973–1996

Source: Irishrock.org.
