= White Side of Night =

- Original cover designed by Jack Breen.

Studio album by Scullion
- Released: 1983
- Recorded: Windmill Lane Studios
- Genre: Folk
- Language: English
- Label: WEA
- Producer: Nicky Ryan; Scullion

Scullion chronology
Balance and Control (1980)	White Side of Night (1983)	Spin (1985)

Singles from White Side of Night
- 1. "Evil" Released: 1983; 2. "Streetwatching" Released: 1983; 3. "White Side of Night" Released: 1983; 4. "Dangerous Game" Released: 1983

White Side of Night is the third studio album by Irish band Scullion. It was released in 1983 by WEA and produced by Nicky Ryan with the band.

== Track listing ==
All tracks are written by Sonny Condell except where noted.

Side one
No.	Title	Lyrics	Music	Length
1.	"Dangerous Game"
2.	"Evil"
3.	"Knife Edge"	Nuala O'Connor	Philip King
4.	"Revenge"
5.	"White Side of Night"	Liz Mellon	King

Side two
No.	Title	Lyrics	Music	Length
6.	"Driving"
7.	"The Actor"
8.	"Bedtime Story"	O'Connor	King / Condell
9.	"Blue Side"	n/a	Greg Boland
10.	"Feast of Eyes"
11.	"Street Watching"

== Personnel ==
=== Scullion ===
- Sonny Condell – vocals, acoustic and electric guitars, acoustic and electric piano, percussion
- Greg Boland – vocals, Prophet and Roland guitars, synthesisers, percussion, additional arrangements
- Philip King – vocals, harmonica

=== Production ===
- Nicky Ryan – producer
- Brian Masterson – engineering
- Pearse Dunne – engineering assistant
- Jack Breen – sleeve design

== Release history ==
Region	Date	Label	Format	Catalog
Ireland	1983	WEA	stereo LP	24.0102-1
Germany	1983	WEA	stereo LP	24.0102-1
