= Weeley Festival =

1971 rock festival near Weeley, England

- Genre: Rock music,
- Dates: August 1971
- Locations: Weeley outside Clacton in Essex, Britain
- Years active: 1971
- Founders: Clacton Round Table
- Attendance: >110,000 (est)
- Capacity: 100,000+
- Website: Anniversary website

Weeley Festival was a British rock festival that took place in August 1971 near the small village of Weeley outside Clacton in Essex.

== History ==
Weeley Festival was organised by Clacton Round Table as a small charity fundraising event for around 5,000 people. When plans for that year's Isle of Wight Festival fell through, focus shifted to Weeley and the festival grew in importance. Advance ticket sales were over 100,000, and estimates of attendance were between 110,000 and 150,000. The festival took place over the August Bank Holiday. The event was promoted as being non-stop music with acoustic acts scheduled to appear between the electric acts, and the music went on day and night.

The opening act were Hackensack, who went on at midnight 27 August 1971 and played an extended set until the next act arrived, which was Principal Edwards Magic Theatre, followed by the Edgar Broughton Band. The Pink Fairies were not originally booked to play. They simply turned up and performed for free to the campers; they were so popular, however, that they were asked to play on the stage.

Evergigging band Stray were famous for exploding dustbins on stage, and they managed, according to their website, be over enthusiastic with the pyrotechnics and caused the local coastguard to be alerted. The band had to apologise to the coastguard.

Footage of the festival, including a performance by Juicy Lucy, appears at the beginning of the Stanley Long-directed feature film Bread.

== Wally of Weeley ==
During the festival there were messages for Wally being read out over the sound system, and a Wally chant developed over the weekend. Evidence suggests that this was a continuation of the same behaviour at the Isle of Wight Festival in 1970, also see Wally Hope. While it started at the IoW festival the year before it had developed at Weeley into an "Anonymous" search for Wally, believed to be the seller of much in demand substances at such festivals.

According to Sue Rees Clacton, "Wally was a young guy who was sitting behind me. He went off to the loo and didn't come back. His friends were calling him. Lots of people called him to help them find him. It wasn't long before the whole festival were calling WALLY. That is how it came about."

== Hells Angels ==
During the festival there were fights between a gang of Hells Angels and stall-holders. The Hells Angels were eventually driven away by a combined force of festival staff and stall-holders despite several casualties. It is reputed that a number of the stall holders had been paying protection money to a London/Essex based crime family and called on them to deal with the Hells Angels. The crime family involved felt obliged to do so to protect their reputation and sent additional "security" to the event to deal with the Hells Angels.

== Performers ==
- Faces
- T.Rex
- Status Quo
- Mungo Jerry
- Mott the Hoople
- Pink Fairies
- King Crimson
- Rory Gallagher
- Barclay James Harvest
- Edgar Broughton Band
- Heads Hands & Feet
- Julie Felix
- Gringo
- Stone the Crows
- Colosseum
- Quintessence
- The Groundhogs
- Caravan
- Lindisfarne
- Tudor Lodge
- Tír na nÓg
- Van der Graaf Generator
- Al Stewart
- Stray
- Principal Edwards Magic Theatre

== See also ==
- List of historic rock festivals
- List of music festivals
