= Someone to Dance With =

Someone To Dance With
- Original cover designed by Carol Diver. The photo was taken by Tim Jarvis.

Studio album by Sonny Condell
- Released: 22 November 1994
- Recorded: Summer 1994, Starc Studios, Dublin
- Genre: Folk
- Length: 49:24
- Language: English
- Label: STARC
- Producer: Sonny Condell; Máire Breatnach

Sonny Condell chronology
Camouflage (1977)	Someone To Dance With (1994)	French Windows (1999)

Professional ratings
Review scores
Source	Rating
Hot Press	9/12 stars

Someone To Dance With is the second solo album by Irish musician Sonny Condell. It was released in 1994 by STARC.

== Track listing ==
All tracks are written by Sonny Condell. All arrangements by Máire Breatnach and Sonny Condell

No.	Title	Length
1.	"Almond Skin"	5:04
2.	"Ocean Floor"	3:24
3.	"Someone To Dance With"	3:51
4.	"Old Poet"	3:28
5.	"Pleasure"	3:36
6.	"Downrunning"	5:11
7.	"Forever Frozen"	4:30
8.	"Groundown"	3:52
9.	"Old Kowloon"	3:14
10.	"Streetsweeper"	2:53
11.	"Guilty"	3:39
12.	"Dream Sequence"	3:24
13.	"The Pink Promenade"	3:18
Total length:		49:24

== Personnel ==
- Sonny Condell – guitars, vocals, backing vocals on tracks 4, 7, 9, 10, 11 and 12, synthesizer on tracks 1, 2, 6 and 13, saxophone Casio Digital and piano Yamaha on "Someone to Dance With", percussion on "Guilty" and "Dream Sequence", mixing
- Máire Breatnach – additional vocals on "Almond Skin" and "Downrunning", backing vocals on tracks 2, 3, 7 and 13, viola on "Almond Skin" and "Forever Frozen", synthesizer on "Ocean Floor" and "Old Kowloon", spoons on "Someone To Dance With", strings on tracks 3, 5, 6, 9, 10, 11, 12 and 13, piano on "Groundown", mixing
- Robbie Casserly – drums, percussion, guitar on "Pink Promenade"
- Paul Moore – bass guitar, double bass on "Street Sweeper"
- Cormac Breatnach – tin whistle on tracks 3, 7, 9, 12 and 13
- Greg Boland – guitars on "Old Poet"
- Philip King – harmonica on tracks 7, 8 and 11
- Robbie Overson – guitars on "Forever Frozen"
- John Whelan – guitars on "Ocean Floor" and "Groundown"
- Máire Brennan – additional vocals on tracks 1,6 and 12
- Alan Connaughton – engineering, mixing
- Brian Narty – engineering
- Ciarán Byrne – engineering

== Release history ==
Region	Date	Label	Format	Catalog
Ireland	22 November 1994	STARC	CD	SCD 295
Ireland	November 1994	STARC	Stereo compact cassette	
