= Navigation (album) =

- Original cover designed by Sonny Condell.

Studio album by Radar
- Released: May 2005
- Recorded: 2004–2005, Ballymorris, County Wicklow
- Genre: Folk, folk rock
- Length: 40:35
- Language: English
- Label: Condell / Radar
- Producer: Paul Barrett

Professional ratings
Review scores
Source	Rating
Irish Music	(favourable)

Navigation is the debut album by Irish Sonny Condell's band Radar and was released in May 2005

== Track listing ==
All tracks are written by Sonny Condell except where noted

No.	Title	Writer(s)	Length
1.	"Subway"		2:59
2.	"Buy a Ticket"		3:40
3.	"Say You"		2:55
4.	"Long Distance Call"	Paul Barrett / Sonny Condell	3:40
5.	"Whirling Water"		4:19
6.	"In Conversation"		3:46
7.	"Surprise You"		4:17
8.	"Sun Is Ever"		3:04
9.	"Sky Blues"		3:58
10.	"Moth"		3:27
11.	"Navigation"		4:29
Total length:			40:35

== Personnel ==
- Sonny Condell – guitars, vocals
- Garvan Gallagher – bass guitar
- Eddie McGinn – drums
- Paul Barrett – keyboards, flugabone
- Mick de Hoog – violin, mandolin
- Eamon O'Reilly – flugelhorn on "Moth"
- Greg Boland – guitar on "Say You"

Production

- Paul Barrett – mixing, production
- Sonny Condell – sleeve design & photography
- Ruarí O'Flaherty – mastering

== Release history ==
Region	Date	Label	Format	Catalog
Ireland	May 2005	Condell / Radar	stereo CD	RAD 001
