= Restless Night (Ray Dolan album) =

- Original cover designed by Ronnie Norton.

Studio album by Ray Dolan
- Released: 1975
- Recorded: April–May 1975, Aisling Studios, Dublin
- Genre: Folk
- Length: 32:28
- Language: English
- Label: EMI Ireland
- Producer: Leo O'Kelly

Singles from Restless Night
- 1. "When I Look at You" / "Paris Song" Released: 1975

Restless Night is the debut album by Irish musician Ray Dolan. It was released in Summer 1975 in Ireland by EMI Ireland and produced by Leo O'Kelly.

== Track listing ==
All tracks are written by Ray Dolan except where noted. All arrangements by Paul Barrett.

Side one
No.	Title	Writer(s)	Length
1.	"When I Look at You"		3:18
2.	"Paris Song"		3:25
3.	"Hey Friend"		2:43
4.	"City Almost Gone"	Michael Fitzgerald	3:40
5.	"Take What You Want"		4:21
Total length:			17:27

Side two
No.	Title	Length
6.	"Restless Night"	3:15
7.	"Constantly Changing"	3:26
8.	"Mad Elaine"	2:26
9.	"The Samaritan"	3:29
10.	"Dog Song"	2:25
Total length:		15:01

== Personnel ==
- Ray Dolan – guitars, vocals
- Paul Barrett – keyboards, bass guitar, trombone, vibraphone, recorder, bongos
- Sonny Condell – guitars, backing vocals
- Brian Dunning – flutes
- Leo O'Kelly – guitars, fiddle, ukulele, backing vocals
- Philip King – harmonica on "Restless Night"
- Desi Reynolds – drums, congas
- Bridget & Siobhan Hefferman, Pat Armstrong – backing vocals

Production

- Leo O'Kelly – production
- Paul Barrett – arrangements
- Walter Samuel, Keith Manfield – engineering
- Ronnie Norton – cover design & photography

== Release history ==
Region	Date	Label	Format	Catalog
Ireland	1975	EMI Ireland	stereo LP	IEMC 6004
