= Looking for the Morning =

- Original cover designed by Ronnie Norton.

Studio album by Gemma Hasson
- Released: 1975
- Recorded: 1975, Dublin Sound Studios, Dublin
- Genre: Folk
- Length: 39:45
- Label: EMI Ireland
- Producer: Leo O'Kelly

Gemma Hasson chronology
Introducing Ireland's Gemma Hasson (1974)	Looking for the Morning (1975)	I've Never Been to Me... (1978)

Singles from Looking for the Morning
- 1. "Thirsty Boots" / "Galway Races" Released: 1976; 2. "The Wild Side of Life" / "The Wonderful Soupstone" Released: 1976

Looking for the Morning is the second album by Northern Irish singer Gemma Hasson. It was released in 1975 in Ireland by EMI Ireland and produced by Leo O'Kelly.

== Track listing ==
Side one
No.	Title	Writer(s)	Length
1.	"Peggy Overseas with a Soldier"		2:33
2.	"Rosemary Lane"		2:55
3.	"Dan Malone"	Sean McCarthy	2:42
4.	"Banks of the Bann"		2:23
5.	"Thirsty Boots"	Eric Andersen	4:43
6.	"Galway Races"		2:14

Side two
No.	Title	Writer(s)	Length
7.	"Country Song"		2:08
8.	"Rathdrum Fair"	Michael Fitzgerald	2:43
9.	"Urge for Going"	Joni Mitchell	4:30
10.	"I Live Not Where I Love"		3:12
11.	"Altmover Stream"		4:27
12.	"Who Will Bury the Children"	Gemma Hasson / Collins	5:15

== Personnel ==
- Gemma Hasson – vocals, guitars
- Leo O'Kelly – guitars, mandolin, fiddle, vocals
- Paul Barrett – keyboards, bass guitar, vocals
- Michael Fitzgerald – guitars on "Rathdrum Fair", vocals
- Dónal Lunny – bouzouki, bodhrán, whistle
- Paul Brady – guitarra, bodhrán, whistle

Production

- Leo O'Kelly – production
- Paul Barrett – arrangements
- Bob Harper, Par Morley, Keith Manfield – engineering
- Ronnie Norton – cover design & photography
- Dave Macken – back cover photography

== Release history ==
Region	Date	Label	Format	Catalog
Ireland	1975	EMI Ireland	stereo LP	LEAF 7008
