= Will (Leo O'Kelly album) =

- Original cover designed by David O'Toole. Photo by Peter Mirolo.

Studio album by Leo O'Kelly
- Released: 17 March 2011
- Recorded: 22 August 2009 – 2010
- Studio: Sirius Art Centre (Cobh, Ireland), Glasthule
- Genre: Folk, folk rock
- Length: 36:52
- Label: Life & Living
- Producer: Leo O'Kelly

Leo O'Kelly chronology
Proto (2003)	Will (2011)

Will is the third album by Irish musician Leo O'Kelly. It was released on 18 March 2011 by Life & Living Records and consists of a collaboration with Liverpool writer John McKeown, who wrote poems that constitute album's lyrics, then adapted in music by O'Kelly.

== Track listing ==
All lyrics are written by John McKeown; all music is composed by Leo O'Kelly.

No.	Title	Length
1.	"Will"	3:55
2.	"Torch Song"	3:12
3.	"The Day You Love Me"	3:07
4.	"I Prayed To the Devil"	2:20
5.	"Alcohol"	2:33
6.	"Kiki of Montparnasse"	2:35
7.	"A Star in My Palm"	3:54
8.	"Old Testament"	2:58
9.	"She Dances"	4:18
10.	"The End of Love"	4:03
11.	"Grave Light"	3:05
12.	"Will Reprise"	0:53
Total length:		36:52

== Personnel ==
- Leo O'Kelly – vocals, guitars, violin, synthesizer, bongos, drum programming
- Hetty Lane – vocals on tracks 1, 5, 6, 7 and 8, harmonica on "The End of Love"
- Garvan Gallagher – bass guitar and Clevinger double bass
- Sonny Condell – Moroccan pottery drums on "Alcohol"
- Holly Hamilton (credited as Barry Whiteside) – ukulele on "Will"

Production

- John McKeown – lyrics
- Leo O'Kelly – production, recording and mixing
- Louise McCormick – recording at Sirius Art Centre and mixing at Manor Studio, Cobh on "Alcohol"
- John Crone – recording at Sirius Art Centre on "Alcohol"
- Andy le Wien – mastering at RMS
- David O'Toole – cover design, insert photo
- Peter Mirolo – front sleeve photography

== Release history ==
Region	Date	Label	Format	Catalog
United Kingdom, Ireland	17 March 2011	Life & Living Records	stereo CD	LALR 09
