= Live at Sirius =

- Original cover designed by David O'Toole. Photo of Jeanie Johnston by Sonny Condell.

Live album by Tír na nÓg
- Released: June 2010
- Recorded: August 21 – 22, 2009; Sirius Art Centre (Cobh, Ireland)
- Genres: folk, folk rock
- Length: 68:58
- Language: English
- Label: Dagger Records
- Producers: Tír na nÓg; Louise McCormick; John Crone

Tír na nÓg chronology
Spotlight (2001)	Live at Sirius (2010)	The Dark Dance (2015)

Professional ratings
Review scores
Source	Rating
Irish Times	3/5 stars

Live at Sirius is a live album by Irish band Tír na nÓg and was released in June 2010, celebrating the duo's 40th birthday. It was recorded from two gigs on August 21, 22, 2009 at the Sirius Art Centre in Cobh. The duo performed tracks taken from their all three studio albums with some exceptions including a cover from The Rolling Stones's Play with Fire.

== Track listing ==
No.	Title	Writer(s)	Length
1.	"Intro"	N/A
2.	"Two White Horses"	Sonny Condell
3.	"Looking Up"	Leo O'Kelly
4.	"Time Is Like a Promise"	Condell
5.	"So Freely"	O'Kelly
6.	"Driving"	Condell
7.	"Play With Fire"	Mick Jagger, Keith Richards
8.	"Bluebottle Stew"	Condell
9.	"Daisy Lady"	O'Kelly
10.	"Piccadilly"	O'Kelly
11.	"Eyelids Into Snow"	Condell
12.	"Venezuela"	O'Kelly
13.	"Strong in the Sun"	O'Kelly
14.	"The Lady I Love"	Condell
15.	"Our Love Will Not Decay"	Condell
16.	"Free Ride"	Nick Drake
17.	"Dante"	Condell
Total length:			68:58

== Personnel ==
- Sonny Condell – vocal, guitar, jews harp, Moroccan pottery drums
- Leo O'Kelly – vocal, guitar, violin, drum programming

Production

- Louise McCormick – recording, mixing at Manor Studio, Cobh
- John Crone – recording
- David O'Toole – cover design
- Sonny Condell – front sleeve photography
- Colin Gillen – live photo

== Release history ==
Region	Date	Label	Format	Catalog
Ireland	June 2010	Dagger Records	stereo CD	N/A
