= Hibernian (album) =

- Original cover designed by Laura Hadwin.

Live album by Tír na nÓg
- Released: February 2000
- Recorded: September 19, 1995
- Genre: Folk
- Length: 55:15
- Label: HTD Records, Talking Elephant

Tír na nÓg chronology
In the Morning (1999)	Hibernian (2000)	Spotlight (2001)

Hibernian is the first live album by Irish band Tír na nÓg. It was recorded on September 19, 1995, by Alan Hadwin at the Hibernian in Birmingham, released in February 2000 by HTD Records and distributed by Pinnacle Entertainment. The album was re-released in 2001 by Talking Elephant, after HTD closed down.

== Track listing ==
No.	Title	Writer(s)	Length
1.	"Time Is Like A Promise"	Sonny Condell	3:07
2.	"When I Came Down"	Leo O'Kelly	4:36
3.	"Love Is Like A Violin"	O'Kelly	3:59
4.	"Someone To Dance With"	Condell	4:24
5.	"So Freely"	O'Kelly	5:28
6.	"Driving"	Condell	3:28
7.	"Venezuela"	O'Kelly	7:53
8.	"Down In The City"	Condell	7:49
9.	"Teesside"	Condell	3:43
10.	"Looking Up"	O'Kelly	5:37
11.	"Two White Horses"	Condell	2:43
12.	"Bluebottle Stew"	Condell	2:13
Total length:			55:15

== Personnel ==
Tír na nÓg

- Sonny Condell – vocals, guitar, Moroccan pottery drums
- Leo O'Kelly – vocals, guitar, violin

Production

- Alan Hadwin – recording, sleeve notes & layout
- Laura Hadwin – front and back cover artworks, sleeve design
- Tim Light – booklet photography
- M – mastering

== Release history ==
Region	Date	Label	Format	Catalog
United Kingdom	February 2000	HTD Records	CD	HTDCD 107
United Kingdom	2 July 2001	Talking Elephant	CD	TECD017
