= Scullion (album) =

- Original cover painting by Pat Musick and designed by himself and Syd Bluett.

Studio album by Scullion
- Released: 1979
- Recorded: Windmill Studios, Dublin; Keystone Studios, Dublin
- Genre: Folk
- Length: 40:05
- Language: English
- Label: Mulligan
- Producer: P.J. Curtis

Scullion chronology
Scullion (1979)	Balance and Control (1980)

Singles from Scullion
- 1. "Peelo" Released: 1979; 2. "The Cat She Went A Hunting" Released: 1979; 3. "The Fruitsmelling Shop" Released: 1979

Scullion is the first album by Irish folk band Scullion. It was released in 1979 by Mulligan Music and produced by P.J. Curtis.

== Track listing ==
Side one
No.	Title	Lyrics	Music	Lead vocals	Length
1.	"The Cat She Went A Hunting"	Sonny Condell	Condell	Condell	3:27
2.	"Educo"	Philip King	King	King	2:34
3.	"The Fruitsmelling Shop" (lyrics excerpted by Sonny Condell from the 10th episode, "The Wandering Rocks", of the James Joyce's Ulysses novel)	Condell	Condell	Condell	3:02
4.	"Flight of the Pretenders"		Greg Boland	Instrumental	2:17
5.	"I Am Stretched On Your Grave" (lyrics translated by Frank O'Connor from the 18th century Irish poem "Ta Me Sinte ar do Thuama")	Frank O'Connor	King	King	5:02
6.	"John The Baptist"	John Martyn	Martyn	King	3:24
Total length:					19:46

Side two
No.	Title	Lyrics	Music	Lead vocals	Length
7.	"Living Blind"	Condell	Condell	Condell	2:51
8.	"Domes"	Gabriel Rosenstock	King	King	3:05
9.	"The Kilkenny Miners"	Condell	Condell	Condell	3:43
10.	"Word About Colour" / "Fonn Mail" (recorded and mixed at Keystones Studios, Dublin)	Julie Driscoll / n/a	Driscoll / Peter Browne	King / n/a	1:55 / 1:55
11.	"Peelo"	Condell	Condell	Condell	3:14
12.	"Cold River"	Condell	Condell	Condell	3:36
Total length:					20:19

== Personnel ==
Scullion

- Sonny Condell — vocals, guitar, piano, saxophone, percussion
- Greg Boland — vocals, guitar, percussion
- Philip King — vocals, harmonica
- Jimmy O'Brien-Moran — uilleann pipes, whistle, recorder

Additional musicians

- Peter Browne — uilleann pipes on tracks 3, 4 and 10b, flute on "Domes" and "Cold River", whistle on "The Kilkenny Miners"
- Kevin Burke — fiddle on "I Am Stretched On Your Grave"
- John McAvoy — fiddle on "Living Blind" and "The Kilkenny Miners"
- Mícheál Ó Domhnaill — harmonium
- Tommy Hayes — bodhran, bones
- Rita Connolly — vocals, backing vocals
- Garvan Gallagher — double bass, drones
- Robbie Brennan – drums

Production

- Philip Begley – engineering
- Paul Thomas, Steve Morris – engineering assistants
- Andrew Boland – engineering on "Word About Colour" and "Fonn Mail"
- Pat Musick – cover painting, sleeve design
- Syd Bluett – sleeve design

== Release history ==
Region	Date	Label	Format	Catalog
Ireland	1979	Mulligan Music	stereo LP	LUN 037
