= French Windows =

Studio album by Sonny Condell
- Released: 1999
- Recorded: 1999, Intimate Studios, London
- Genre: Folk
- Length: 47:40
- Language: English
- Label: Hummingbird Records
- Producer: Graham Henderson

Sonny Condell chronology
Someone to Dance With (1994)	French Windows (1999)	Backwater Awhile (2001)

Singles from French Windows
- 1. "They Don't Say" Released: 1999; 2. "Wishfull Thinking" Released: 24 January 2000

Professional ratings
Review scores
Source	Rating
Hot Press	9/12 stars
Irish Music Magazine	(positive)
The Irish Times	(positive)
RTÉ Guide	(positive)

French Windows is the third solo album by Irish musician Sonny Condell. It was released in 1999 by Hummingbird Records.

== Track listing ==
All tracks are written by Sonny Condell. All arrangements by Graham Henderson.

No.	Title	Length
1.	"Wishfull Thinking"	4:51
2.	"Long Dark Evenings"	3:50
3.	"They Don't Say"	4:31
4.	"Tea in a Field"	3:52
5.	"Jericho"	4:44
6.	"Into Stars"	5:07
7.	"Telephone"	3:27
8.	"Tell My Heart"	5:10
9.	"Hungry For You"	4:51
10.	"A Dust of Frost"	3:47
11.	"French Windows"	3:25
Total length:		47:40

== Personnel ==
- Sonny Condell – guitar, vocals
- Neil MacColl – electric & acoustic guitars
- Simon Edwards – bass
- Graham Henderson – synthesizer, organ, accordion, mandola, backing vocals
- Roy Dodds – drums & percussion
- Helen Boulding – backing vocals

Production

- Graham Henderson – production
- Jock Loveband – engineering
- Cai Murphy – assistant engineer
- Fionan Higgins – mastering at Digital Pigeon, Dublin
- Red Dog – album design

== Release history ==
Region	Date	Label	Format	Catalog
Ireland	1999	Hummingbird Records	CD	HBCD0016
