= Gemma Hasson =

- Genres: folk, Irish traditional music
- Occupation(s): Musician, songwriter
- Instrument(s): Vocals, guitar
- Years active: 1970s–1990s
- Labels: Dolphin Records, EMI Ireland Ltd, Ritz Records

Gemma Hasson is a Northern Irish folk singer that recorded three studio albums from 1974 to 1978. Her first one, Introducing Ireland's Gemma Hasson was released in 1974 on Dolphin Records label and produced by Dónal Lunny. She then signed with EMI Records and launched two more album: Looking for the Morning in 1975 (produced by Leo O'Kelly) and I've Never Been to Me... in 1978. Several singles were issued on Ritz Records and private label in the 1980s.
Most of the materials she sings are covers of Irish traditional although she also recorded some contemporary songs (like Joni Mitchell's "Urge for Going") and has written some of them.

== Discography ==
- Introducing Ireland's Gemma Hasson (1974)
- Looking for the Morning (1975)
- I've Never Been to Me... (1978)
