= Proto (Leo O'Kelly album) =

- Original cover designed by David O'Toole. The photo was taken in 1986 by Chris Robinson.

Studio album by Leo O'Kelly
- Released: 4 February 2003
- Recorded: May 1975 – 2001
- Length: 52:40
- Label: Clarinda & 1st
- Producer: Mark Gilligan; Leo O'Kelly; Trevor Knight; Dónal Lunny; Naima; Brian Moore; Matthew Fisher; Mr. Spring
- Compiler: Leo O'Kelly; Garvan Gallagher

Leo O'Kelly chronology
Glare (2001)	Proto (2003)	Will (2011)

Proto is the second solo studio album by Irish musician Leo O'Kelly. It was originally planned for November 2002 but was released on 4 February 2003 by Clarinda & 1st. It contains a collection of previously unreleased tracks recorded from May 1975 to 2001.

== Track listing ==
All tracks are written by Leo O'Kelly except where noted.

No.	Title	Writer(s)	Length
1.	"Northern Sky"	Nick Drake	3:54
2.	"Blew My Clouds"	Azure Days, Joe Downay	5:20
3.	"Long Summer"		3:23
4.	"This Window's Not High Enough"		2:59
5.	"Portsmouth"		2:21
6.	"Show Me a Cloud"		2:59
7.	"Venezuela"		4:07
8.	"Los Angeles"		3:49
9.	"Henry the Peacemaker"		3:46
10.	"Telecaster Man"		4:26
11.	"Love Is Like a Violin"		3:09
12.	"Long Summer"		3:16
13.	"Venezuela"		4:36
14.	"Da Da o a Ya"	Aaron O'Kelly
154.	Untitled		3:30
Total length:			52:40
