= Tír na nÓg (album) =

- Original UK album cover. The photo was taken in 1970 during the first photography session of the band, on the rooftops over Oxford.

Studio album by Tír na nÓg
- Released: May 1971
- Recorded: 1971, Livingstone Studios, Barnet, London
- Genre: Folk
- Length: 44:24
- Label: Chrysalis
- Producer: Bill Leader

Tír na nÓg chronology
Tír na nÓg (1971)	A Tear and a Smile (1972)

Professional ratings
Review scores
Source	Rating
Allmusic	3/5 stars
Radio Centraal (Psyche van het folk)	4/5 stars

Tír na nÓg is the first album by Irish band Tír na nÓg. It was released in May 1971 in the United Kingdom by Chrysalis Records and distributed by Island Records but was not published in the United States because Leo O'Kelly and Sonny Condell refused to record a cover of Bob Dylan's "Maggie's Farm" for the album, a song they regularly played live.
German and Spanish presses of the LP have an Island label although the Chrysalis logo also appears on them.

== Track listing ==
=== LP track listing ===
Side one
No.	Title	Writer(s)	Length
1.	"Time Is Like A Promise"	Sonny Condell	2:56
2.	"Mariner Blues"	Condell	4:12
3.	"Daisy Lady"	Leo O'Kelly	2:21
4.	"Tir Na Nog"	O'Kelly	5:20
5.	"Aberdeen Angus"	Condell	1:50
6.	"Looking Up"	O'Kelly	4:51

Side two
No.	Title	Writer(s)	Length
1.	"Boat Song"	O'Kelly	3:24
2.	"Our Love Will Not Decay"	Condell	3:04
3.	"Hey Friend"	Ray Dolan	3:01
4.	"Dance Of Years"	Condell	3:50
5.	"Live A Day"	Condell	3:04
6.	"Piccadilly"	O'Kelly	5:35
7.	"Dante"	Condell	2:56
Total length:			44:24

=== Compact Cassette track listing ===
Side one
No.	Title	Writer(s)	Length
1.	"Time Is Like A Promise"	Sonny Condell	2:56
2.	"Mariner Blues"	Condell	4:12
3.	"Daisy Lady"	Leo O'Kelly	2:21
4.	"Tir Na Nog"	O'Kelly	5:20
5.	"Boat Song"	O'Kelly	3:24
6.	"Looking Up"	O'Kelly	4:51

Side two
No.	Title	Writer(s)	Length
1.	"Aberdeen Angus"	Condell	1:50
2.	"Our Love Will Not Decay"	Condell	3:04
3.	"Hey Friend"	Ray Dolan	3:01
4.	"Dance Of Years"	Condell	3:50
5.	"Live A Day"	Condell	3:04
6.	"Piccadilly"	O'Kelly	5:35
7.	"Dante"	Condell	2:56
Total length:			44:24

== Personnel ==
- Sonny Condell – vocals, guitar, Moroccan pottery drums, tablas, jews harp
- Leo O'Kelly – vocals, guitar, dulcimer, electric bass, tin whistle
- Nic Kinsey – engineering
- Nick Harrison – arranger
- Bill Leader – production

=== Additional personnel ===
- Barry Dransfield – fiddle on "Tir Na Nog"
- Annie Crozier – psaltery on "Time Is Like A Promise"

== Release history ==
Region	Date	Label	Format	Catalog
United Kingdom	May 1971	Chrysalis Records	stereo LP	ILPS 9153
United Kingdom	1971	Chrysalis, Island Records	stereo Compact Cassette	ZCI 9153
Germany	1971	Chrysalis, Island	LP	85 547 IT
Spain	1971	Chrysalis, Island	LP	85 547 IT
United Kingdom	1992	BGO Records	remastered CD	BGOCD53
