= Children of Lir =

Legend from Irish mythology

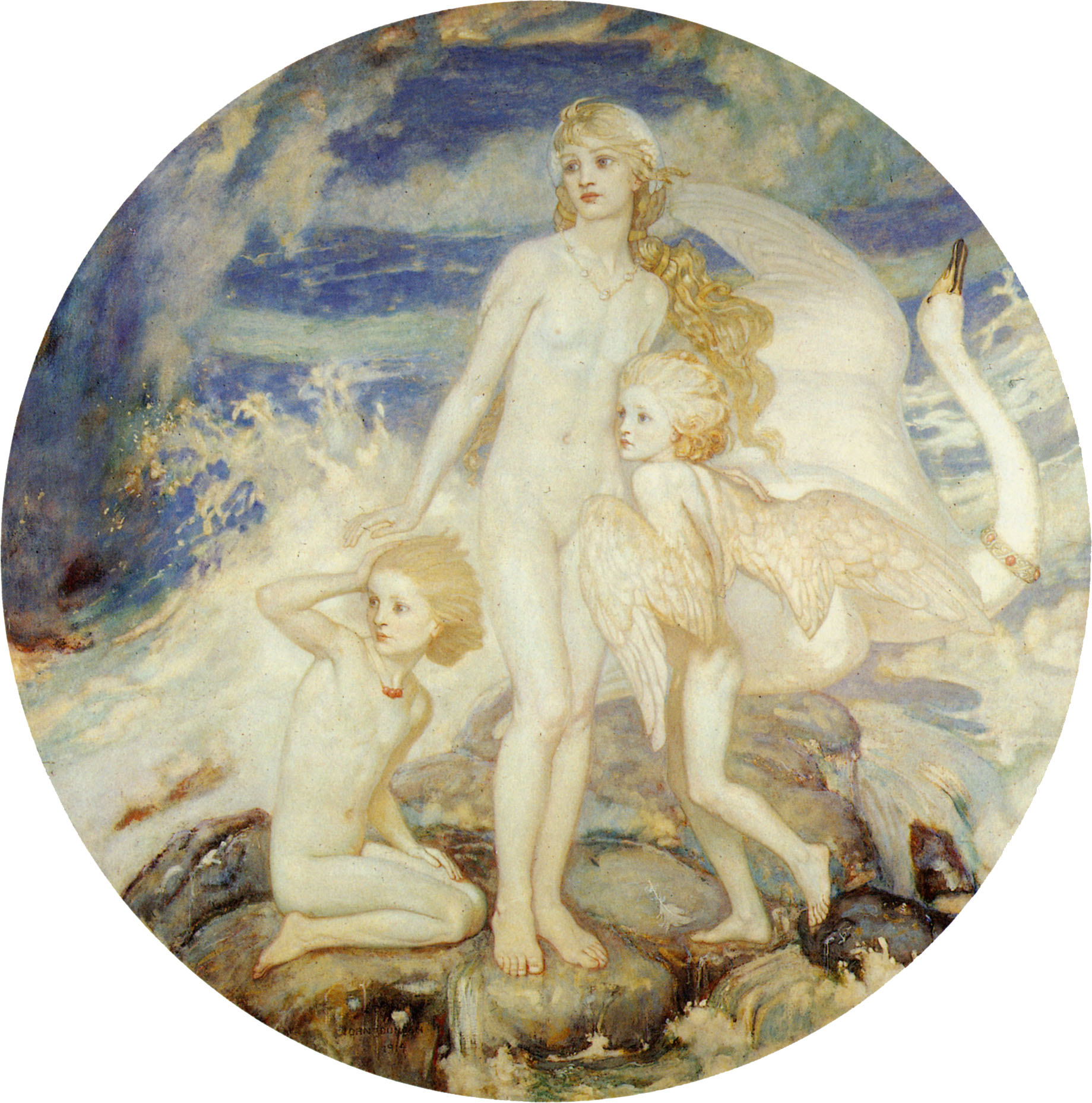
The Children of Lir (1914) by John Duncan

The Children of Lir (Irish: Oidheadh chloinne Lir) is a legend from Irish mythology. It is a tale from the post-Christianisation period. It mixes magical elements, such as wands and spells, with a Christian message of faith bringing freedom from suffering.

== Naming and manuscripts ==
Named in Irish as Oidheadh Chlainne Lir, the tale is today often known simply as "The Children of Lir" but the title has also been rendered as The Tragic Story of the Children of Lir or The Fate of the Children of Lir, or, from the earlier title Aided Chlainne Lir, as The Violent Death of the Children of Lir. The English translation should properly be "The Children of Lear", Lir being a genitive, but the mistranslation has become culturally embedded.

In post 18th-century scholarship, the tale has often been grouped with the Oidheadh chloinne Uisnigh ("The Fate of the Children of Uisnigh") and Oidheadh chloinne Tuireann ("The Fate of the Children of Tuireann") as the Trí truagha na sgéalaigheachta, i.e. "The three sorrows of storytelling", also known as "The Three Sorrowful Tales of Erin". Scholar and folklorist Robin Flower has suggested that all three tales may have had a common author sometime in the 14th century, by someone in the circle of the Mac Fhirbhisighs in north-west Connacht. These three tales have been collated and translated from the Irish language into English.

Manuscripts containing early versions of the tales include MS 72.1.38 and MS 72.2.6 at the National Library of Scotland, MS Egerton 164 at the British Library, and MS 24 A 13, and MS E vi 4 at the library of the Royal Irish Academy.

== Legend ==
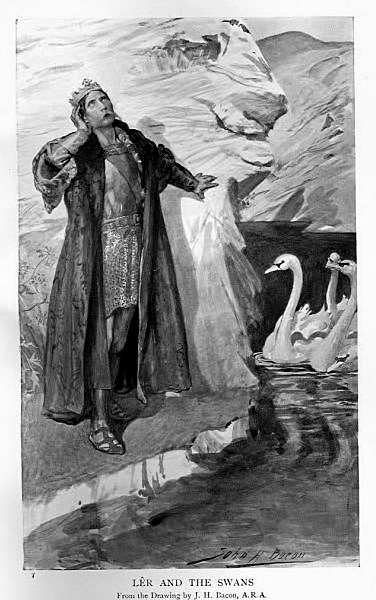
Lêr and the Swans by H.R. Millar's (1905)

Location of the three places of exile of the Children of Lir

Based on (Duffy 1883); a point summary is given in Duffy 1883, pp. xv–xvi Numerals refer to those in the point summary and in Duffy's text itself.

The legendary historical setting of the story is the end of the dominion of the Tuatha Dé Danann in Ireland, and the corresponding rise of the Milesians.

[2-9] Bodb Derg was elected king of the Tuatha Dé Danann, to the annoyance of Lir, who felt that he himself should have been chosen; Lir did not swear obedience to the new King, to the annoyance of those who had elected him, causing strife, though Bodb sought to appease them. After some time Lir's wife died—to appease Lir, Bodb gave one of his daughters, Aoibh, to him in marriage. Lir agreed that he would yield the lordship, and form an alliance—ending the strife.

[10-13] Aoibh bore Lir four children: one girl, Fionnghuala, and three sons, Aodh and twins, Fiacra and Conn. After the birth of the twins, Aoibh died, causing great grief to Lir, though he was bolstered by his love for the four children. Bodb then sent another of his daughters, Aoife, to marry Lir, which he accepted happily. The children were a joy both to Lir and to Bodb.

[14-18] After a short while, Aoife became jealous of the affection given to the four stepchildren, and she feigned illness for around a year. One day, she set out in her chariot with the four children, with design to kill them, and called her entourage to slay them, stating that because of them she had lost Lir's love, and promising them rich rewards. However, they would not help, so she drew a sword, but was not able to follow through with the act. Next she took them to Loch Dairbhreach and made them bathe, but once in the water, she cast a spell of metamorphosis in order to transform them into four white swans.

[19-23] Fionnghuala rebuked her, stating that her magic power was not as great as that of their friends to undo the spell, and warned her of the revenge she would face—she asked her to set a limit on the time of the spell. She set a period of three hundred years as a swan on Loch Dairbhreach; (Note: Lake of the Oaks, Loch Derryvaragh.(Duffy 1883, note 29, p.84)) three hundred more on Sruth na Maoilé; (Note: Sruth na Maoilé aka Sruthar na Maoilé Chinntiré, the strong current near the Mull of Cantire, see Straits of Moyle.(Duffy 1883, note 33 pp.84-5)) and three hundred at Iorrus Domnann and Inis Gluairé. (Note: Iorrus Domnann, now known as Erris in County Mayo; Inis Gluairé, "Glory Island", in the Bay of Erris, County Mayo. (Duffy 1883, note 34, 35, 36 p.85)) She also foretold that by expiration of the period of the spell, Lairgenn (the great-grandson of the King of Connacht), and Deoch (the great-granddaughter of the King of Munster) would be wed. Aoife relented a little and allowed the children to retain the power of speech, stating they would sing plaintive songs without equal, and that they would not be distressed by being in the forms of birds. Aoife then returned to Bodb's court—when he asked why the children were not with her, she claimed that Lir did not trust him with them, but Bodb was suspicious and sent messengers to Lir.

[24-32] On receiving the messenger, Lir became sad, realising that Aoife had done some harmful act. He then set out, and at the shores of Loch Dairbhreach, he encountered the swans singing with human voices. They told him of Aoife's evil act, and Lir and his people lamented, though that night they stayed and listened to the swans' song. Lir reached Bodb, and told him of Aoife's treachery. Bodb cursed her, saying her suffering would be greater than the children's, and asked what the worst form of being was that she could imagine—Aoife stated a Demon of the air was the worst, and on this Bodh struck her with a druid's wand, metamorphosing her into such a demon, so she flew off and remained that way.

[33-45] Bodb and the people of the De Danann went to Loch Dairbhreach and listened to the swans' singing. Milesians came too, and the music calmed and delighted all who heard it. After three hundred years the time came for the swans to go north to the cold Sruth na Maoilé. At this time it was proclaimed that no swan should be killed in Erin. At the Maoilé a cruel storm separated them, and though they eventually reunited their time there was wretched, with extremes of cold and weather to contend with, but they could not leave, as it was their lot to stay in the waters there.

[46-52] Eventually the swans came across a company of the De Danann and of the Milesians who had been seeking them, led by Aodh and Fergus sons of Bodb—near the mouth of the Banna. (Note: River Bann, (Duffy 1883, note 51 p.87)) The swans enquired and received good news about the De Danann, Lir, and Bodb. After the allotted time the swans then left for Iorrus Domhnann. There they encountered a young man who took an account of their adventures.

[53-55] One night at Iorrus, the cold and weather became so intense that the waters froze, and the swans' feet froze to the ice. Because of their suffering they pleaded to the "King of Heaven" to ease the plight of birds, and having and professing faith in a "true God, perfect, truly intelligent" their pleading was heard, and from then they were protected from storms and bad weather. Eventually the time allotted to Iorrus Domhnann passed and they decided to go to Sioth Fionnachaidh, where Lir lived.

[56-61] However once there, they found it deserted, derelict, and overgrown. The next day they set off for Inis Gluairé—there many birds congregated around them at the lake. Eventually Saint Patrick and Christianity came to Ireland, and one day the holy man Mochaomhóg arrived at Inis Gluairé—the swans heard him ringing a bell calling matins, and became frightened at the sound. However Fionnghuala declared the sound of the bell would liberate them from the curse of the spell, and so they listened to it. When it finished they sang a song. The holy man heard their song, and discovered that it was swans that sang it. Speaking to them he asked if they were the Children of Lir, stating that he had travelled to that place for their sake.

[62-66] The swans put their trust in the holy man, and allowed him to bind them with silver chains. The birds felt no fatigue or distress in their situation in the company of the monk. Eventually the account of the swans reached Deoch, the wife of Lairgnen, the King of Connacht—she asked him to get the swans for her. He sent messengers immediately but the monk Mochaomhóg refused, making Lairgnen angry. He went to Mochaimhóg himself, and attempted to grasp the swans, but on his touch the swans' feathers fell off revealing three very old men, and an old woman, all lean, and very bony. On this Lairgnen left.

[67-70] Fionnghuala asked the monk to baptise them and to bury each, stating she sensed they were close to death. They were baptised, then died, and were buried. Mochaomhóg was sad for them. That was the fate of the children of Lir.

== Analysis ==
Folklorists have supposed a connection between the Irish tale The Children of Lir and tale type ATU 451, "The Maiden who Seeks her Brothers", of the international Aarne-Thompson-Uther Index. Joseph Jacobs was of the notion the tale of "The Swan Children" was an independent folktale that was inserted into the Tuatha de Dannan cycle. In the same vein, Dáithí Ó hÓgáin suggested that the tale spread to Ireland from a narrative about "swan-children" that developed in Continental Europe, in the Netherlands.

== Adaptations in other media ==
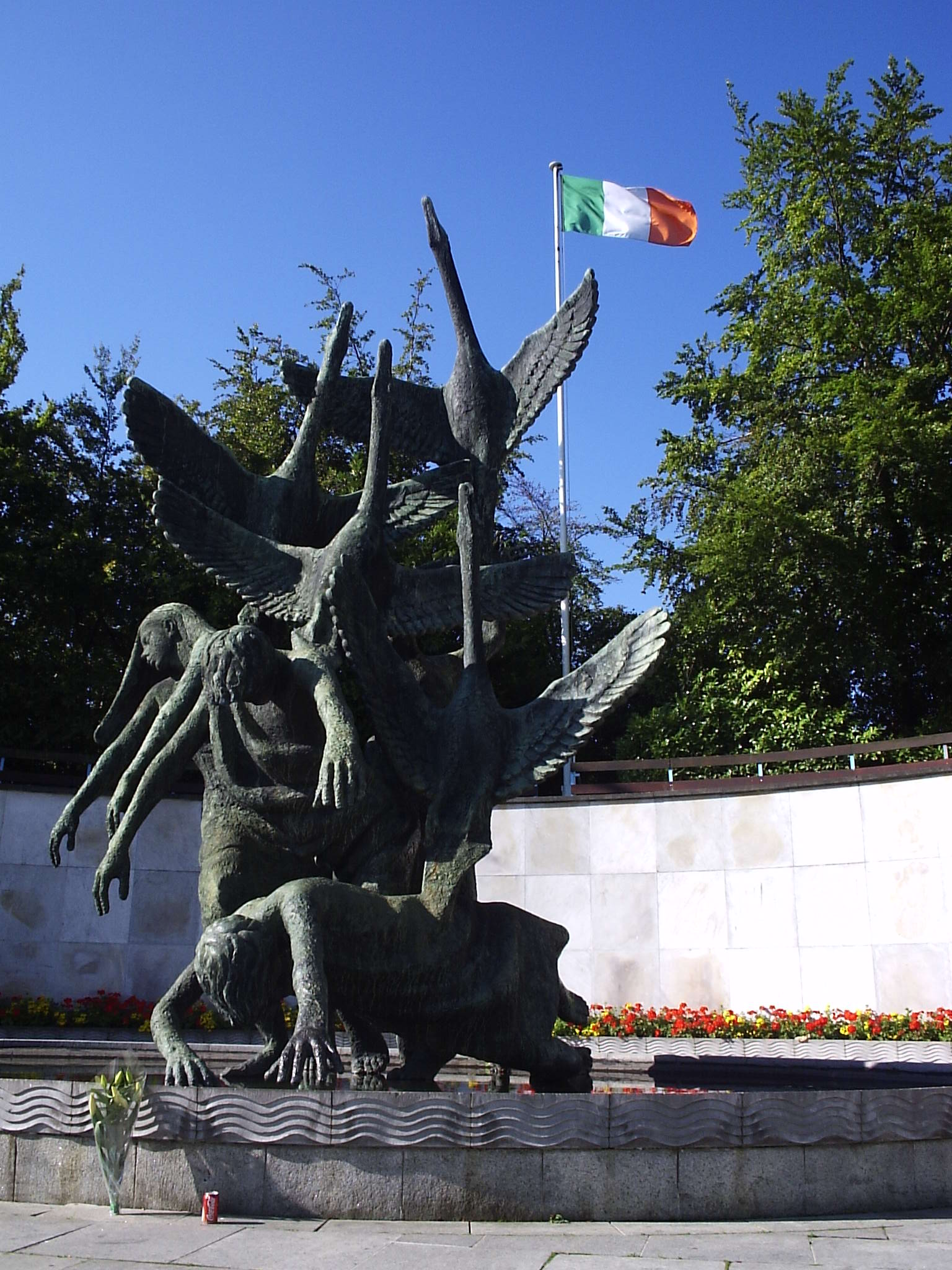
A sculpture of the Children of Lir at The Garden of Remembrance in Dublin.

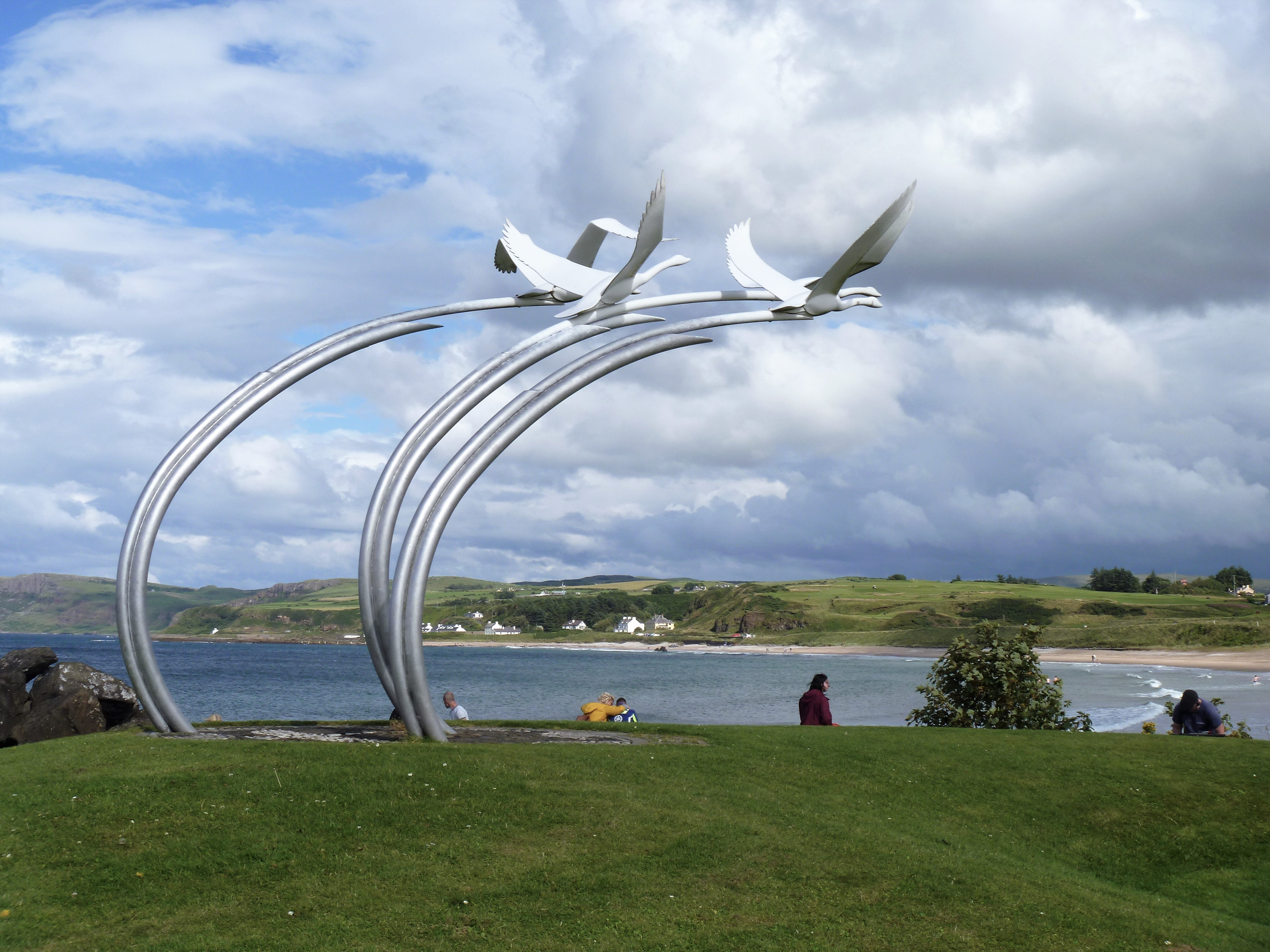
A 2011 sculpture of the Children of Lir in Ballycastle, County Antrim.

Michael McDunphy's proposed design for the flag of the president of Ireland from 1944, featuring the Children of Lir.

=== Classical music ===
- The song Silent O Moyle, Be The Roar of Thy Water (the song of Fionnuala) from Thomas Moore's Irish Melodies, tells the story of the children of Lir.
- Irish composer Geoffrey Molyneux Palmer (1882–1957) based his opera Srúth na Maoile (1923) on the legend of the children of Lir.
- Irish composer Hamilton Harty (1879–1941) wrote the orchestral tone poem The Children of Lir (1938).
- Irish composer Redmond Friel (1907–1979) wrote the music for Joan Denise Moriarty's ballet The Children of Lír, which was performed by the Cork Ballet Company, accompanied by the Cork Symphony Orchestra under Aloys Fleischmann, during the Ballet Week of May 1950 in the Cork Opera House
- Irish composer Robert Lamb (born 1931) wrote The Children of Lir (1970), a suite for orchestra, with narrator.
- Irish composer Patrick Cassidy (born 1956) wrote The Children of Lir (1991), an oratorio with libretto in the Irish language.

=== Modern music ===
- Folk-rock group Loudest Whisper recorded an album The Children of Lir based on a stage presentation of the legend in 1973–74.
- Folk metal-band Cruachan published a song called "Children of Lir" on their album Folk-Lore in 2002.
- Pagan-metal group Primordial wrote a song called "Children of the Harvest" based on the legend.
- "Children of Lir" is a song depicting the legend sung by Sora in her album Heartwood.
- Mary McLaughlin has an album Daughter of Lír on which there are two songs dealing with this legend, "Fionnuala's Song" and "The Children of Lir".
- Sinéad O'Connor's song "A Perfect Indian" from the album Universal Mother contains references to "Lir's children".

=== Sculpture ===
- A statue of the Children of Lir, created by the sculptor Oisin Kelly and cast by Ferdinando Marinelli Artistic Foundry of Florence, Italy, is in the Garden of Remembrance, Parnell Square in Dublin, Ireland. It symbolises the rebirth of the Irish nation following 900 years of struggle for independence from England and, later, the United Kingdom, much as the swans were "reborn" following 900 years.
- Another statue depicting the legend is located in the central triangular green of the village of Castlepollard, County Westmeath, some three-miles northeast of Lough Derravaragh. A plaque outlines the famous story in several languages.
- A sculpture of the Children of Lir is situated in Ballycastle, County Antrim, close to the beach on the Sea of Moyle, where the children were cursed to spend 300 years.

=== Stained Glass ===
- Wilhelmina Geddes (Irish Artist 1887–1955). Stained Glass staircase window of eight panels commissioned by Belfast City Council Libraries, Museums and Art Committee 2 September 1929, completed March 1930. Currently located in the Ulster Museum, Belfast, not on display.

=== Literature ===
- Patrick Kennedy (folklorist) adapted the tale as The Four Swans in The Bardic Stories of Ireland (1871).
- P.W. Joyce (1827–1914) published the tale in his Old Celtic Romances, London: David Nutt, 1879
- Douglas Hyde (1860–1949) published a translation in his Three Sorrows of Storytelling, London: Unwin Fisher, 1895
- Thomas Wentworth Higginson adapted the legend as The Swan-Children of Lir, in Tales of the Enchanted Islands of the Atlantic (1898).
- The legend was published as The Doom of the Children of Lir in The true annals of fairy-land: the reign of King Herla (1900).
- Katharine Tynan, b. 1859 d. 1931, published the poem 'The Children of Lir' in 1907 as part of a collection entitled 'Twenty One Poems by Katharine Tynan: Selected by WB Yeats'.
- T.W. Rolleston (1857–1920) included the tale in his Myths and Legends of the Celtic Race, London: Harrap, 1911
- The story was retold as The Four White Swans in a 1916 publication.
- Walter Hackett wrote a modern retelling of the tale of the Children of Lir in The Swans of Ballycastle, illustrated by Bettina, published by Ariel Books, Farrar, Straus & Young Inc., New York, 1954.
- Deirdre Sullivan wrote Savage Her Reply, a version of the fable from the perspective of the stepmother, illustrated by Karen Vaughan, published by Little Island, Poland, 2020.

== See also ==
- Nine Daughters of Ægir and Rán, children of two parents who personify the sea in North Germanic sources
- Tullynally Castle, suggested as the location of Lir's castle because of its proximity to Lough Derravaragh
- Natalia O'Shea, vocalist and harpist, lead of the Russian Celtic-folk band named Clann Lir (the Family of Lir)

== Sources ==
- MacKillop, James, ed. (2004), "Oidheadh Chlainne Lir", A Dictionary of Celtic Mythology, doi:10.1093/acref/9780198609674.001.0001, ISBN 9780198609674
- Breatnach, Caoimhín (1999), "The Religious Significance of Oidheadh Chloinne Lir", Ériu, 50: 1–40, JSTOR 30007727

=== Translations ===
- Duffy, Richard J., ed. (1883), Oidhe chloinne Lir: The fate of the children of Lir (in Irish and English), revision of (O'Curry 1863)
  - Online HTML e-text edition via CELT: gaelic, english
- Lady Gregory, Augusta (1904), "(Part I 'The Gods' : Book V) The Fate of the Children of Lir", Gods and fighting men: the story of the Tuatha de Danann and of the Fiana of Ireland, pp. 140–158
- Jacobs, Joseph (1895), "The Fate of the Children of Lir", More Celtic Fairy Tales
- Joyce, P.W. (1920), "The Fate of the Children of Lir; or, The Four White Swans", Old Celtic Romances, pp. 1–36
- O'Curry, Eugene, ed. (1863), "The "Trí thruaighe na scéalaigheachta" (i.e. the 'Three most sorrowful tales',) of Erinn. II. "The fate of the children of Lir"", The Atlantis, 4: 113–157
- O'Faolain, Eileen (1954), Irish Sagas and Folktales, Oxford University Press
