= Fivepenny Piece =

English folk band

- Origin: Ashton-under-Lyne and Stalybridge, England
- Genres: Folk
- Years active: 1967–1985; mid-1990s–2004
- Labels: EMI; Columbia; One-Up; Philips; BDA; Sound Waves
- Past members: Lynda Meeks; John Meeks; George Radcliffe; Colin Radcliffe; Eddie Crotty; Trevor Chance; Andrea Mullins; Pete Brew; Bernard Wrigley; Alan Taylor; John Eatock; Norman Prince; Paul Johnston

Fivepenny Piece was a five-piece folk band formed in 1967 around Ashton-under-Lyne and Stalybridge in Tameside, England. The band met and performed on Wednesday nights at Ashton's Broadoak Hotel, which gave them their original name The Wednesday Folk.

== Career ==
Their break came when they entered and won the Granada Television talent show New Faces in 1968 (not to be confused with ATV talent show New Faces which didn't begin until 1973), which led to a contract with the Noel Gay agency, a recording contract with EMI, and their new name.

Many of their mostly self-penned songs reflected their roots, using Lancashire dialect, with references to the mining and weaving trades, the mills and factories, and the Lancashire characters who lived in the area. But there was another side to the group's music, perhaps best described as more pop-oriented. The band's music is most often categorised as folk.

The original personnel were John Meeks (24 March 1937, Stalybridge, Cheshire - 25 April 2026) (guitar, vocals); John's sister Lynda Jane Meeks (1 August 1947, Stalybridge – 22 January 2013) (vocals); brothers George Radcliffe (9 August 1937, Ashton-under-Lyne, Lancashire – 2002) (bass, vocals) and Colin Radcliffe (19 January 1934, Ashton-under-Lyne – 2025) (guitar, vocals); and Eddie Crotty (24 February 1942, Stalybridge – 11 April 2009) (guitar, vocals). John Meeks and Colin Radcliffe wrote most of their best-known songs, although Crotty also penned several. The unofficial sixth member of the band was the drummer Phil Barlow, who accompanied them in many of their concerts and on their albums.

During the band's 1970s heyday they released over a dozen albums for EMI and then Philips, and reached the Top 10 in the UK Albums Chart with their LP King Cotton. They performed multiple times on national television, and had their own BBC Television series, The Fivepenny Piece Show.

By the early 1980s the group had reached an impasse, and John Meeks' departure was followed soon afterwards by Lynda Meeks. With John's replacement Trevor Chance (born 1 March 1942, Gilsland, Cumberland) and Andrea Mullins (formerly of the Caravelles), the band continued until 1985 when they broke up.

The group reformed in the mid-1990s, and played occasional gigs with various personnel, including the Lancashire folk singer and comedian Bernard Wrigley and Pete Brew. Crotty and George Radcliffe continued to play in the band, along with Mullins. Salford-born guitarist and vocalist Paul Johnston joined the band in the late 1990s as they continued to perform, their final show being at the Grand Theatre in Lancaster around 2004.

George Radcliffe ran the 'Star Inn' pub in Ashton-under-Lyne in the early 1980s and died at the end of 2002, and Eddie Crotty, the band's only remaining original member, died of a heart attack in hospital on 11 April 2009, aged 67, after being ill for the previous nine years. Lynda Jane Meeks died from cancer on 22 January 2013, aged 67 years, at the Christie Hospital in Manchester. Colin Radcliffe died in 2025, after living in retirement in Wales. John Meeks, the sole surviving original member of the group, died on 25 April 2026, aged 89.

For a while in the 1970s the group had a weekly interlude spot on the BBC programme That's Life! with Esther Rantzen.

== Albums ==
- The Fivepenny Piece (1972) Columbia
- Songs We Like To Sing (1973) Columbia
- Making Tracks (1973) Columbia – UK No. 37
- The Fivepenny Piece ... On Stage (1974) One-Up
- Wish You Were Here (1975) EMI
- King Cotton (1976) EMI UK No. 9
- Telling Tales (1977) EMI
- On Stage Again (1977) One-Up
- Both Sides of Fivepenny Piece (1978) EMI
- Peddlers of Songs (1979) Columbia SCX 6607
- Life Is A Game Of Chance (1979) Philips 9109 234
- An Evening With The Fivepenny Piece (1980) Philips 6382 154
- Lancashire, My Lancashire (1980) EMI compilation
- Here We Are Again (1982) BDA Records BDLP 001
- 57 Fivepenny Favourites (1996) Sound Waves SOW 525
- Better Than Ever (exact date unknown) band self issue FP2501

== Singles ==
- Running Free / Land of Half Past Nine (1969) Columbia
- Hang the Flag Out Mrs. Jones / Little Boy Little Girl (1969) Columbia
- There's A Great Deal of Difference / Ee By Gum (1972) Columbia
- A Gradely Prayer / Reflections of Emily (1972) Columbia
- The People Tree / Homemade Brew (1973) Columbia
- Gotta Get Away / I'm Powfagged (1973) Columbia
- Save Your Last Kiss for Me / Butterflies and Songbirds (1974) EMI
- Big Jim / Ee By Gum (1975) EMI
- Watercolour Morning / Old England (1976) EMI
- I'll Still Be in Love With You / Flamingo (1978) Columbia
- It's a Long Way / In a World of Three Foot Nothing (1982) Mike Records
- The Christmas Story / Christmas Spirit (1982) Mike Records

== Songbooks ==
- Fivepenny Piece – songbook no. 1
- Fivepenny Piece – songbook no. 2
