= Eagle's Whistle =

- Original cover designed by Ronnie Norton.

Studio album by Crubeen
- Released: August 1976
- Recorded: 1976, Dublin Sound Studios
- Genre: Irish traditional music
- Length: 41:36
- Label: EMI Ireland Ltd
- Producer: Leo O'Kelly

Crubeen chronology
| Eagle's Whistle (1976) | Crubeen (1978) |

Professional ratings
Review scores
| Source | Rating |
|---|---|
| Limerick Leader | (positive) |

Eagle's Whistle is the debut album by Irish folk group Crubeen released on LP record by EMI Ireland in 1976.

== Background and recording ==
Crubeen was formed in the early 1970s. They recorded and produced in Dublin.

Crubeen released their debut album Eagle's Whistle in 1976 with EMI Ireland and followed it up by another album with the simple title 'Crubeen' in 1978 released by CBS records. They also featured on a number of compilations albums 'Best of Irish Folk' alongside The Sands Family and Planxty.

== Release history ==
| Region | Date | Label | Format | Catalog |
|---|---|---|---|---|
| Ireland | 1976 | EMI Ireland | stereo LP | LEAF 7011 |

== Eagle's Whistle track listing 1976 ==
Side one
| No. | Title | Length |
|---|---|---|
| 1. | "Gem of the roe" | 3:49 |
| 2. | "Fead an lolair ( eagle's whistle )" | 2:28 |
| 3. | "Building Up and Tearing England Down" | 3:20 |
| 4. | "Flower of Scotland" | 3:01 |
| 5. | "William Hollander" | 3:53 |
| 6. | "Belfast Brigade" | 3:44 |

Side two
| No. | Title | Length |
|---|---|---|
| 1. | "Wilie Archer" | 3:16 |
| 2. | "Mourne Maggie" | 2:57 |
| 3. | "Three jigs (The Morning Mist, Ellis Jig, The Mug of Brown Ale)" | 3:01 |
| 4. | "My own Native Land" | 4:57 |
| 5. | "An Bensin Lauchra (The Little Bench of Rushes)" | 2:27 |
| 6. | "Sam Hall" | 4:43 |
| Total length: | | 41:36 |

== Personnel ==
Crubeen

- Benny McKay: bodhran and vocals
- Eddie Ruddy: flute, whistle, and concertina
- Barney Gribben: banjo, mandolin, concertina, harmonica
- Tommy Hollywood: guitar, mandolin, vocals
- Paddy Clerkin: vocals, guitar, double bass, five string banjo
- John Waterson: fiddle, viola, dulcimer
- Billy Fegan: tin whistle, harmonica and vocals

Production team

- Leo O'Kelly – production
- Bob Harper – engineering
- Ronnie Norton – cover design & photography
