= Crubeen, County Laois =

Townland in central Ireland

Coordinates: 52.959°N 7.294°W

Crubeen (Irish: Crúibín) is a townland in central Ireland that consists of about 600 acres (2.4 km^{2}).

== See also ==
- List of townlands of County Laois
