= A Tear and a Smile (Tír na nÓg album) =

Studio album by Tír na nÓg
- Released: 7 April 1972 (UK); 20 October 1972 (US)
- Recorded: February 1972
- Studio: Morgan Studios, London
- Genre: folk
- Length: 38:03 (UK edition); 35:25 (North America edition)
- Label: Chrysalis
- Producer: Tony Cox; Bill Leader

Tír na nÓg chronology
Tír na nÓg (1971)	A Tear and a Smile (1972)	Strong in the Sun (1973)

Singles from A Tear and a Smile
- 1. "The Lady I Love" Released: 1972; 2. "Bluebottle Stew" Released: 1972

Professional ratings
Review scores
Source	Rating
Allmusic	4/5 stars

A Tear and a Smile is the second album by Irish band Tír na nÓg. It was released in the United Kingdom on 7 April 1972 by Chrysalis Records and was the first Tír na nÓg album to be released in the United States, in October 1972. The track list is different between the US and the UK releases. Because of this, two editions of the album exist but there was no reissue of the North American version.
On this last one, "Daisy Lady" and "Dante" are taken directly from the first album Tír na nÓg. The song "Looking Up" was already on the previous album but Leo O'Kelly was not very satisfied by the first version: he and Sonny Condell decided to record a new one, produced by Tony Cox, for A Tear and a Smile. The Lady I Love which was released as a single in Europe, appears also on the US version of the album, these four songs replacing "Down Day", "Bluebottle Stew", "Hemisphere", and "Goodbye My Love".

== Track listing ==
=== 1972 UK edition ===
Side one
No.	Title	Writer(s)	Length
1.	"Come And See The Show"	Sonny Condell	3:17
2.	"Down Day"	Condell	5:50
3.	"When I Came Down"	Leo O'Kelly	4:33
4.	"The Same Thing Happening"	O'Kelly	4:47
5.	"Bluebottle Stew"	Condell	2:19

Side two
No.	Title	Writer(s)	Length
1.	"So Freely"	O'Kelly	3:33
2.	"Hemisphere"	Condell	2:15
3.	"Lady Ocean"	O'Kelly	4:33
4.	"Goodbye My Love"	O'Kelly	4:20
5.	"Two White Horses"	Condell	2:36

=== 1972 North America edition ===
Side one
No.	Title	Writer(s)	Length
1.	"Come And See The Show"	Condell	3:14
2.	"Daisy Lady"	O'Kelly	2:16
3.	"When I Came Down"	O'Kelly	4:32
4.	"The Same Thing Happening"	O'Kelly	4:47
5.	"Looking Up"	O'Kelly	3:33
Total length:			18:22

Side two
No.	Title	Writer(s)	Length
1.	"The Lady I Love"	Condell	3:17
2.	"So Freely"	O'Kelly	3:32
3.	"Two White Horses"	Condell	2:39
4.	"Lady Ocean"	O'Kelly	4:35
5.	"Dante"	Condell	3:00
Total length:			17:03

== Personnel ==
- Sonny Condell – vocals, guitar, clavinet, percussion
- Leo O'Kelly – vocals, guitar
- Larry Steele – bass
- Barry De Souza – drums
- Paul Tregurtha – engineering
- Nick Harrison – arranger
- Tony Cox – production
- Bill Leader – production

== Release history ==
Region	Date	Label	Format	Catalog
United Kingdom	7 April 1972	Chrysalis Records	stereo LP	CHR 1006
United Kingdom	7 April 1972	Chrysalis, Island Records	mono 8-track	Y8HR 1006
United Kingdom	1972	Chrysalis	stereo 8-track	Y8HR 1006
United Kingdom	1972	Chrysalis	stereo compact cassette	ZCHR 1006
Germany	1972	Chrysalis	stereo LP	6307 504
Spain	1972	Chrysalis	stereo LP	6307 504
United States	20 October 1972	Chrysalis	stereo LP	CHR 1006
United States	1972	Chrysalis	Reel-to-reel tape (7½ in/s)	CHR 1006-C
Canada	October 1972	Chrysalis	stereo LP	CHR 1006
Australia	1972	Chrysalis	stereo LP	SCYL-934,623
New Zealand	1972	Chrysalis	stereo LP	SCYL-934,623
New Zealand	1972	Chrysalis	stereo compact cassette	CY-24623
United Kingdom	September 1991	Edsel Records	CD	ED CD 334
