= Glare (album) =

Album by Leo O'Kelly

- Original cover designed by David O'Toole. The photo was taken in 2000 by Barry Moore.

Studio album by Leo O'Kelly
- Released: 2 February 2001
- Studio: Sun & Clarinda Way Studios, Dublin
- Length: 42:59
- Label: Clarinda & 1st
- Producer: Trevor Knight

Leo O'Kelly chronology
Glare (2001)	Proto (2003)

Professional ratings
Review scores
Source	Rating
Hot Press	10/12 stars
The Irish Times	3/5 stars
RTÉ Guide	(positive)

Glare is the first album by Irish musician Leo O'Kelly. It was originally planned for October 2000 but was released on 2 February 2001 in Ireland by Clarinda & 1st and distributed by Gael-Linn Records.

== Track listing ==
All tracks are written by Leo O'Kelly except where noted

No.	Title	Writer(s)	Length
1.	"Streets of This Town"		3:33
2.	"Venezuela"		5:34
3.	"Switch to Stereo"		3:38
4.	"You Took All the Fun Out of It"		2:57
5.	"Ricochet"		5:49
6.	"14 Iced Bears"		2:59
7.	"You Prefer Jim"		2:14
8.	"This Plane Is Dragging Me Down"		4:43
9.	"Love Between Us"		3:43
10.	"When the Gate Squeaks"		3:46
11.	"On My Way Home"	Klaus Harvey	3:57
Total length:			42:59

== Release history ==
Region	Date	Label	Format
Ireland	2 February 2001	Clarinda & 1st	CD
