= Crubeen (band) =

- Also known as: The Longkesh Ramblers
- Origin: Newry, County Down, Northern Ireland
- Genre: Irish traditional music
- Labels: Clanrye Records; EMI (Ireland); CBS Records (Ireland)
- Members: Eddie Ruddy; Billy Fegan; Barney Gribbon; Tommy Hollywood; Paddy Clerkin; Benny McKay; John Waterson

Crubeen, formerly The Longkesh Ramblers, was a 1970s Irish folk band from Newry, County Down, Northern Ireland.

== Background and recording ==
As the Longkesh Ramblers, they released Songs of the Irish People in 1974.

Crubeen recorded and produced all their material in Dublin.

Crubeen released their debut album Eagle's Whistle in 1976 with EMI Ireland and followed it up by another album with the simple title Crubeen in 1978, released by CBS records. They also featured on a number of compilations albums Best of Irish Folk, alongside The Sands Family and Planxty.

== Personnel ==
Crubeen

- Benny McKay: bodhran and vocal
- Eddie Ruddy: flute, whistle and concertina
- Barney Gribbon: banjo, mandolin, concertina and harmonica
- Tommy Hollywood: guitar, mandolin and vocal
- Paddy Clerkin: vocals, guitar, double bass, five string banjo
- John Waterson: fiddle, viola, dulcimer
- Billy Fegan: tin whistle, harmonica and vocal

Production team

- Leo O'Kelly – production
- Bob Harper – engineering
- Ronnie Norton – cover design & photography

== Discography ==
Source: The Irish Music Review

- Eagle' Whistle (1976, LP, EMI, Ireland)
- Crubeen (1978, LP, CBS Records, Ireland)

== Crubeen featured on compilation albums ==
Side one
No.	Title	Artists	Length
1.	"gem of the roe"	Crubeen
2.	"Finnegans Mill"	The Sands Family
3.	"Dan Malone (McCarthy)"	Gemma Hasson
4.	"Three Drunken Maidens"	Planxty
5.	"Arthur McBride"	The Blacksmiths
6.	"Four Drunken Nights"	Aileach
7.	"Ard Ti Cuain"	The Sands Family
8.	"Willie Archer"	Crubeen

Side two
No.	Title	Artists	Length
1.	"P Stands For Paddy"	Aileach
2.	"Streets Of Derry"	The Sands Family
3.	"Building Up And Tearing England Down"	Crubeen
4.	"Galway Races"	Gemma Hasson
5.	"Whiskey In The Jar"	The Blacksmiths
6.	"Sí Beag, Sí Mor"	Planxty
7.	"The Bonny Labouring Boy"	Aileach
8.	"Rathdrum Fair (Michael Fitzgerald)"	Gemma Hasson

The Best Of Irish Folk see it here Label: EMI Catalogue Number: # PCD-2059 LP 1977—EMI PCD-2059 LP

Best of Irish Folk Label: One Up Catalogue Number: # OU 2180 16 Track Compilation Featuring Crubeen, Sands Family, Gemma Hasson, Planxty, Aileach & Blacksmiths

The best of Irish Folk - album ( 1980 ) Label: Peters International Records Catalogue Number:# PLD 2059
