= The Children of Lir (Loudest Whisper album) =

Studio album by Loudest Whisper
- Released: 1974
- Recorded: 1974
- Genres: Folk rock; progressive folk
- Length: 45:42
- Label: Polydor (Ireland)
- Producer: Leo O'Kelly

Loudest Whisper chronology
The Children of Lir (1974)	Loudest Whisper (1980)

The Children of Lir is the debut album by Irish folk rock/progressive folk group Loudest Whisper. It is the studio adaption of the musical of the same name that was performed in Fermoy, Ireland in 1973. The album was released on LP record in Ireland by Polydor Records in 1974 in a limited edition of 500 copies.

The Children of Lir is a folk opera based on the Irish legend of King Lir and his children who are turned into swans. The album was reissued on CD in the UK in the mid-1990s, but the original LP recording has become one of the most sought after records in Ireland, and ranks among the top 100 rarest records in the world.

== Background and recording ==
Loudest Whisper was formed in the early 1970s by songwriter and guitarist Brian O'Reilly. In 1972 O'Reilly composed a Celtic musical based on the Irish legend of the Children of Lir, and it premiered in Fermoy, Ireland in January 1973. The performance attracted "a lot of regional attention", and Polydor Records signed a record deal with Loudest Whisper. The group went to the studio in early 1974 to record The Children of Lir, their first album and a studio adaption of the musical.

The album was recorded on weekends at Trend Studios in No 10 Lad Lane, Dublin, because the musicians all had day jobs and had to travel from Fermoy. Leo O'Kelly of Tir Na N-Og produced the album, with Paul Waldron, Trend's house engineer, on the sound desk. Electric and acoustic guitars were used, plus a string quartet and a children's choir, a combination which was "very experimental for its time". The music was recorded first and the vocals were added later. Because the studio was small, the choir had to be split into boys and girls and recorded separately.

== Releases ==
When The Children of Lir was completed, it was rejected by Polydor in the UK and ended up being released by Polydor in Ireland only in a limited edition of about 500 copies. It was not until 1994 that the album was released in the UK by Kissing Spell on CD. In 1995, a limited edition (500 copies) remastered version was released on vinyl in the UK by English Garden Records. In 2006 Sunbeam Records released a new LP edition with a gatefold cover, and a CD edition with six bonus tracks, including the ten-minute broadcast of the original stage performance in 1973 by Ireland's national broadcaster, RTÉ.

The original 1974 LP release of The Children of Lir has become one of the most sought after records in Ireland, and currently ranks among the top 100 rarest records in the world.

== Reception ==
Professional ratings
Review scores
Source	Rating
AllMusic	3.5/5 stars

Richard Falk wrote in the book Galactic Ramble that The Children of Lir is a "wonderful progressive folk concept album, with a mystical atmosphere and mellow vocals". Falk said Geraldine Dorgan's singing on "Wedding Song" was "exquisite".

Richie Unterberger at AllMusic described the album as "respectable if unexceptional folk-rock with tinges of progressive rock", and added that it has "a slightly lagging-behind-the-times feel in its basic production and earnest naïveté". Unterberger said that the album can be enjoyed without having to follow the story, and that the songs are generally "modestly enjoyable" on their own.

== Track listing ==
All tracks written by Brian O'Reilly.

=== 1974 LP release ===
Side one

1. "Overture" – 5:31
2. "Lir's Lament" – 2:24
3. "Good Day, My Friend" – 3:29
4. "Wedding Song" – 2:39
5. "Children's Song" – 2:10
6. "Mannanan I" – 2:52
7. "Mannanan II" – 3:09

Side two

1. "Children of the Dawn" – 3:00
2. "Dawning of the Day" – 4:30
3. "Septimus" – 4:44
4. "Farewell Song" – 3:15
5. "Cold Winds Blow" – 4:44
6. "Sad Children" – 3:15

=== 2006 CD release bonus tracks ===
1. "William B" (single A-side) – 3:45
2. "False Prophets" (single B-side) – 3:15
3. "Wrong and Right" (single B-side) – 3:42
4. "Silent O'Moyle" (demo) – 5:54
5. "The Wheel of Life" (demo) – 2:38
6. "Children of Lir" (original RTÉ broadcast) – 10:35

Source: Irishrock.org.

== Personnel ==
- Brian O'Reilly – guitars, piano, keyboards, vocals
- Geraldine Dorgan – guitar, vocals
- Paud O'Reilly – drums, harmonies
- Mike Russell – bass guitar
- Producer – Leo O'Kelly
- Engineer – Paul Waldron
