= Tudor Lodge =

Tudor Lodge were an English folk music ensemble, which was formed in 1968, featuring John Stannard and Roger Strevens. The group started playing at the White Horse in Reading, England, and later made appearances at other clubs on the folk circuit. In 1969, Lyndon Green replaced Strevens and within a year, they were joined by the American singer and flautist, Ann Steuart. This new line up of Tudor Lodge, Stannard, Green and Ann Steuart successfully gigged the south east English folk circuit for the next two years, playing at numerous venues, including the Troubadour and Les Cousins clubs in London. This scene included artists including Ralph McTell, Al Stewart, Mike Cooper and John Martyn. Although there is no information to confirm that Tudor Lodge actually gigged with any of these major names.

Teaming up with manager Karl Blore towards the end of 1970, Tudor Lodge signed by Vertigo Records and their first self-titled album was released in 1971. The original vinyl copy of the album is rare and commands a high price. After which the band played at larger venues, including the Cambridge Folk Festival and the Weeley Festival in Clacton.

Tired from constant touring and with little money, Ann Steuart left the band in November 1971. A six-week tour of the Netherlands had been scheduled for January and February 1972 and Linda Peters replaced Steuart. On their return, Peters left to pursue a musical career with Richard Thompson. Her departure signalled a temporary end to Tudor Lodge.

In the spring of 1972, Lyndon Green travelled to Berlin with Mike Silver, where he spent the next year playing gigs and recording album tracks with Silver as well as with the American John Vaughan. In 1981 Steuart, Green and Stannard got together to play a reunion show and Stannard and Green decided to resurrect Tudor Lodge, recruiting Lynne Whiteland. In 1988, Green moved to Japan and Stannard and Whiteland starting playing and recording as a duo. In 1999, Tudor Lodge played two gigs in Tokyo, where Whiteland and Stannard were joined on stage by Green and Japanese musicians Bice (keyboard and vocals) and Shimizu Hirotaka (bass). Tudor Lodge then continued to play at folk clubs and festivals in the South of England.

John Stannard quit his later career as a driving instructor and has reissued all the Tudor Lodge material, and picked up the guitar and played the Reading style blues, billed as John Cee Stannard. In 2013, Stannard issued his first solo release, Doob Doo Album.

John Stannard died on 18 March 2020.

== Discography ==
- 1971 LP: Tudor Lodge (self-titled) — UK/Vertigo
- 1971 Single: "The Lady's Changing Home" b/w "The Good Times We Had" — UK/Vertigo
- 1997 CD: Let’s Talk — UK/Cast Iron Recordings
- 1998 CD: It All Comes Back — US/Scenescof
- 1999 CD: Dream — UK/Cast Iron Recordings
- 2003 CD: Runaway — Japan/Belle Antique
- 2006 CD: Avalon — UK/Cast Iron Recordings
- 2006 CD: Unconditional — UK/Cast Iron Recordings
- 2013 CD: Stay — UK/Cast Iron Recordings
- 2016 CD: Spaces — UK/Cast Iron Recordings
