= Scullion (group) =

Irish folk rock band

- Origin: Ireland
- Genre: Folk rock
- Years active: 1979–present
- Labels: Mulligan Music, WEA, Dara Records, Kitten Records, Hummingbird Productions
- Members: Sonny Condell; Philip King; Robbie Overson
- Past members: Greg Boland; Freddie White; Jimmy O'Brien Moran; Robbie Brennan
- Website: www.scullion.com

Scullion is an Irish folk rock band that formed in the mid-1970s. The group is popular in Ireland, releasing LPs and two CDs, in addition to the compilation Ghosts And Heroes on the Kitten label in 1992 and another compilation, Eyelids into Snow – A Collection, in 2001. The founding members were Sonny Condell (also a member of another popular Irish music band Tír na nÓg), Philip King, Greg Boland and Jimmy O'Brien Moran. O'Brien Moran left the band in 1980, after the first album. Robbie Overson, replacing guitarist Greg Boland, joined the band in 1987. Scullion continue to play live.

== History ==
In 1976, Sonny Condell and Philip King played together with Freddie White (vocals and guitar), Mick Daly (vocals and guitar), Dan Fitzgerald (drums) and Eamon Doyle (bass). King came up with the name "Scullion" for this collective.

In the summer of 1979, former Tír na nÓg songwriter Sonny Condell (vocals and guitar) was sharing a flat in Dún Laoghaire, County Dublin with Greg Boland (guitarist), whom he had befriended during the recording of Camouflage, his debut solo album on the Mulligan label. They were joined around this time by Philip King (vocals and harmonica) who, having decided to quit teaching for a career in music, had also become their flatmate. Boland had just left Irish band Stagalee and they began performing some informal gigs together.

=== Early years ===
A record deal was agreed and in late-1979, the band recorded their first album in Windmill Lane Studios. At Curtis' suggestion, Jimmy O'Brien Moran (pipes) was brought in to add a Celtic musical tone to the sound and the band was expanded to four. The debut album, Scullion, was released in early 1980 and generated an increased demand for live performances. There followed a busy period of live performances, including an appearance at the Lisdoonvarna Music Festival in County Clare, which was to expand the audience base to national level. The band also spent a couple of months in the Netherlands, during which time they played some support concerts to John Martyn, whom they subsequently approached to produce their second album Balance and Control (1981) on the newly established Warner Bros. (Ireland) label. O'Brien Moran decided to pursue formal music studies at this point and the band reverted to a trio. They disbanded a first time late 1981 after a gig in Loughrea. At some time, throughout a twelve-month gap, they were approached by Nicky Ryan, who had just finished working as sound engineer and manager of Clannad. He offered the band to arrange a new tour which took place in autumn 1982. Ryan produced the third Scullion album, White Side of Night in 1983.

=== Mid-1980s onwards ===
In spring of 1985, the trio were approached to record and tour again. The result was Spin, their fourth album. The single Carol received very good airplay in Ireland over the next nine months, culminating in a performance at Self Aid on 17 May 1986. Shortly afterwards, Boland left the band after nearly seven years. He was replaced by Robbie Overson, who had previously played with acts including The Business and Red Peters, and remains the third member. In 1988, this lineup recorded the Cooler at the Edge EP which was produced by Donal Lunny. Two compilation albums Eyelids into Snow – A Collection, and Ghosts and Heroes have been released, with both including live tracks, among them Overson's original composition "Maguire & Patterson", later recorded by other artists under the title "Maguire and Paterson", including Sharon Shannon.

In mid-2012, Scullion recorded a new collection of songs and released in September of that year their first album in 27 years Long Wave. It was followed in September 2022 by a sixth studio album Time Has Made a Change in Me. The album was preceded by two singles: a cover of The National's "I Need My Girl", and "All the Bells in Spain". A further single, "The House Came Down", featuring Natacha Atlas, followed in 2025.

== Discography ==
- Scullion (1979)
- Balance and Control (1981)
- White Side of Night (1983)
- Spin (1985)
- Ghosts And Heroes (1992)
- Eyelids into Snow - A Collection (2001)
- Long Wave (2012)
- Under The Moon (2015)
- Time Has Made a Change in Me (2022)
