= Strong in the Sun =

Studio album by Tír na nÓg
- Released: 26 October 1973 (UK); January 1974 (U.S.)
- Recorded: June–August 1973
- Genre: folk
- Length: 35:44
- Label: Chrysalis
- Producer: Matthew Fisher

Tír na nÓg chronology
| A Tear and a Smile (1972) | Strong in the Sun (1973) | In the Morning (1999) |

Singles from Strong in the Sun
- 1. "Strong in the Sun" Released: 7 September 1973

Professional ratings
Review scores
| Source | Rating |
|---|---|
| Allmusic | 3.5/5 stars |

Strong in the Sun is the third studio album by Irish band Tír na nÓg. It was released on 26 October 1973 in the United Kingdom and in January 1974 in the United States.

== Track listings ==
Side one
| No. | Title | Writer(s) | Length |
|---|---|---|---|
| 1. | "Free Ride" | Nick Drake | 3:05 |
| 2. | "Whitestone Bridge" | Sonny Condell | 4:12 |
| 3. | "Teesside" | Condell | 3:52 |
| 4. | "Cinema" | Leo O'Kelly | 4:39 |
| 5. | "Strong in the Sun" | O'Kelly | 3:38 |

Side two
| No. | Title | Writer(s) | Length |
|---|---|---|---|
| 6. | "The Wind Was High" | O'Kelly | 3:20 |
| 7. | "In The Morning" | Condell | 3:21 |
| 8. | "Love Lost" | O'Kelly | 3:19 |
| 9. | "Most Magical" | Condell | 3:46 |
| 10. | "Fall of Day" | Condell | 2:32 |

== Personnel ==
- Sonny Condell - vocals, acoustic and rhythm guitar, pottery drums, jaw harp
- Leo O'Kelly - vocals, acoustic and lead guitar, dulcimer, violin
- Matthew Fisher - keyboards, production
- Geoff Emerick - engineering

=== Additional personnel ===
- Brian Odgers, Dave Markee, Jim Ryan - bass
- Barry De Souza, Ace Follington, Jeff Jones - drums

== Album single ==
- "Strong in the Sun"
  - Released: 7 September 1973 (UK)

== Release history ==
| Region | Date | Label | Format | Catalog |
|---|---|---|---|---|
| United Kingdom | 26 October 1973 | Chrysalis Records | stereo LP | CHR 1047 |
| Germany | 1973 | Chrysalis | stereo LP | 6307 524 |
| Australia | 1973 | Chrysalis | stereo LP | L 35023 |
| New Zealand | 1973 | Chrysalis | stereo LP | L 35023 |
| United States | January 1974 | Chrysalis | stereo LP | CHR 1047 |
| United Kingdom | 1991 | Edsel Records | CD | ED CD 336 |
