= Camouflage (Sonny Condell album) =

- Original cover designed by Sonny Condell. The photo was taken by Michael Fitzgerald.

Studio album by Sonny Condell
- Released: June 1977
- Recorded: January 1977,
- Studio: Lombard Sound, Dublin
- Genre: Folk
- Length: 42:43
- Language: English
- Label: Mulligan
- Producer: Shaun Davey

Sonny Condell chronology
Camouflage (1977)	Someone to Dance With (1994)

Singles from Camouflage
- 1. "Down in the City" Released: 1977

Camouflage is the debut solo album by Irish musician Sonny Condell. It was released in June 1977 in Ireland by Mulligan Music.

== Track listing ==
All tracks are written by Sonny Condell. All arrangements by Condell, Jolyon Jackson and Greg Boland

Side one
No.	Title	Length
1.	"Camouflage"	6:40
2.	"Moon Dust"	3:35
3.	"Red Sail"	4:28
4.	"Down in the City"	6:59
Total length:		21:42

Side two
No.	Title	Length
1.	"Movie of You"	5:47
2.	"Why Do We Fight?"	4:05
3.	"Leaders of Men"	7:00
4.	"Backwaterawhile"	4:09
Total length:		21:01

== Personnel ==
- Sonny Condell – acoustic guitar, vocals, saxophone, percussion
- Jolyon Jackson – keyboards, cello
- Greg Boland – acoustic and electric guitar, bass guitar
- Fran Breen – drums, percussion
- Ciarán Brennan – double bass
- Brian Dunning – flutes
- Paul Barrett – trombone
- Rosemary Taylor – backup vocals

Production

- Shaun Davey – production
- Brian Materson – engineering
- Sonny Condell – cover design
- Michael Fitzgerald – front & back covers photography
- Bill Doyle – Ciarán Brennan photography

== Release history ==
Region	Date	Label	Format	Catalog
Ireland	1977	Mulligan	stereo LP	LUN 010
Ireland	2004	Mulligan	CD	LUNCD 010
