= Tír na nÓg (band) =

Irish musical group

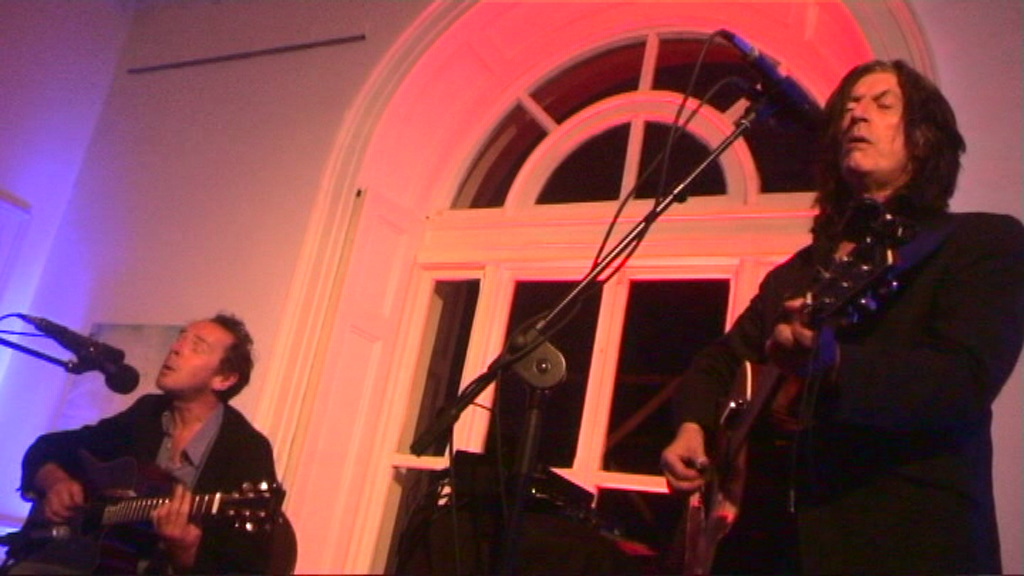
- Tír na nÓg (l-r): Sonny Condell, Leo O'Kelly) performing at the Sirius Arts Centre in Cobh, Ireland on 21 August 2009

Background information
- Origin: Dublin, Ireland
- Genres: Folk, progressive folk, progressive rock
- Years active: 1969–1974, 1985–present (one-time reunions: 1975, 1976)
- Labels: Chrysalis, Edsel, Beat Goes On, Erewhon, HTD, Talking Elephant, Hux, Fruits de Mer
- Members: Sonny Condell; Leo O'Kelly
- Website: www.tirnanog-progfolk.com

Tír na nÓg are an Irish folk duo formed in Dublin, Ireland, in 1969 by Leo O'Kelly and Sonny Condell. They are often considered one of the first progressive folk bands with other artists like Nick Drake or groups like Pentangle. Their music mainly consists of their own compositions, based on strong Celtic roots and typically featuring intricate acoustic guitar playing and close harmony singing. In their early years, they toured the folk clubs of the United Kingdom or internationally as a support act for several rock bands. Today, they sporadically give concerts, especially in Ireland.

From 1971 to 1973, Tír na nÓg made three studio albums which were highly acclaimed by critics but did not obtain commercial success. No recording of live performances had been officially released until 2000, with the publication of Hibernian. A compilation of some of their live tracks recorded between 1972 and 1973 for John Peel's radio show was also published one year later.

== Formation of the band ==
Sonny Condell came from Newtownmountkennedy in the Wicklow Hills. His early musical influences were mainly classical music. Before Tír na nÓg were formed, he played with cousin John Roberts as Tramcarr 88. They released one single before the break-up of the band.

Leo O'Kelly came from Carlow. He was influenced by heavy rock, including Jimi Hendrix, The Velvet Underground and The Doors. Before the formation of Tír na nÓg he played in several bands starting with local Carlow beat group The Word before joining The Tropical Showband and Emmet Spiceland, with whom he toured.

O'Kelly and Condell met in Dublin in 1969 and discovered a shared ambition to be singer-songwriters. They started playing together, taking the name Tír na nÓg from Celtic mythology, and writing a song of the same name, which recounts the legend of Tír na nÓg. They travelled to London and began touring the folk clubs, and secured a recording deal with Chrysalis Records.

== 1971–1974: performing and recording ==
Tír na nÓg in 1972. From left to right: Leo O'Kelly, Sonny Condell

Tír na nÓg made three studio albums between 1971 and 1973. The first was called Tír na nÓg, and was produced by Bill Leader. It achieved Melody Maker 'Album of The Month' status on its release in May 1971. It featured mainly their own songs, strongly rooted in the Celtic tradition, but also influenced by eastern music. Condell and O'Kelly played acoustic guitars and occasional bongos and other percussion instruments. Their guitar work was intricate and complex, leading to their being compared to bands such as The Incredible String Band and Pentangle. However, their style was quite distinctive. Often, they would use different open tunings for their two guitars.

Their second album A Tear and a Smile was released in 1972, and produced by Tony Cox. This featured similar material to the first album. However, with their third album Strong in the Sun (released in 1973), produced by Procol Harum organist Matthew Fisher who also played keyboards on the album, they introduced more electric instruments and drums. From Alan Robinson's 2004 liner notes to BGO's reissue of this and the previous album on one CD: "..Certainly, of the three original Tír na nÓg albums, Strong in the Sun is by far the most conventional, most mainstream, although that's not to say that Fisher had ironed out all of the band's entertainingly whimsical rough edges. Fisher gave a bit of a more clearly-defined shape and a greater depth to their sound, neatly framing the duo's contrasting vocal styles." Robinson also remarked that this high quality album didn't "reverse the duo's sales fortunes" and that it opened with "that rarest of things", a Nick Drake cover, "Free Ride".

As well as the folk club circuit, Tír na nÓg also toured internationally, as a support act for various rock bands, including Jethro Tull, Procol Harum, The Who, Emerson, Lake & Palmer or Chicago. In July 1974, the British music magazine, NME, reported that the band was to play their final concert, in Dublin on 27 July that year.

The radio presenter, John Peel, promoted their music and they performed a number of live sessions for the BBC.

== Later years ==
After the break-up of Tír na nÓg in 1974, they both returned to Ireland to pursue solo careers. Condell recorded a solo album called Camouflage in 1977, and went on to form the band Scullion with Philip King, Greg Boland and Jimmy O'Brien Moran. O'Kelly pursued a career as a producer and has also released solo albums.

Tír na nÓg reformed in 1985, releasing the single "Love Is Like a Violin", and have toured sporadically since then. Four albums – from various early and later recording dates – have followed: In 1999, In The Morning, an album of 15 previously unreleased demos from April 1970 recorded in Dublin, Ireland, was issued by the Kissing Spell record label. Hibernian, released in 2000, is a September 1995 live performance from Birmingham, UK, and Spotlight in 2001, contains original John Peel BBC radio sessions from 1972/1973. In 2010, they launched a new live album, Live at Sirius, recorded at the Sirius Arts Centre in Cobh, County Cork on 21/22 August 2009.

In 2014, they released I Have Known Love, a four-track, 7-inch vinyl EP on Fruits de Mer Records in anticipation of their next studio album to be released the following year. Alongside three originals, the lead track is a cover of The Silver Apples' "I Have Known Love".

On 24 May 2015, Tír na nÓg released The Dark Dance, their first studio album since 1973. The following year, Mega Dodo records released the live LP Live at the Half Moon.

== Discography ==
=== Studio ===
- Tír na nÓg (1971)
- A Tear and a Smile (1972)
- Strong in the Sun (1973)
- In the Morning (1999) (previously unreleased demos)
- I Have Known Love (2014) (4-track EP)
- The Dark Dance (2015)

=== Live ===
- Hibernian (2000)
- Spotlight (2001)
- Live at Sirius (2010)
- Live at the Half Moon (2016)
- Live 1970-'71 (2022)
- Love Lost - Live In Bremen 1973 (2023)
