= Sonny Condell =

Irish singer-songwriter

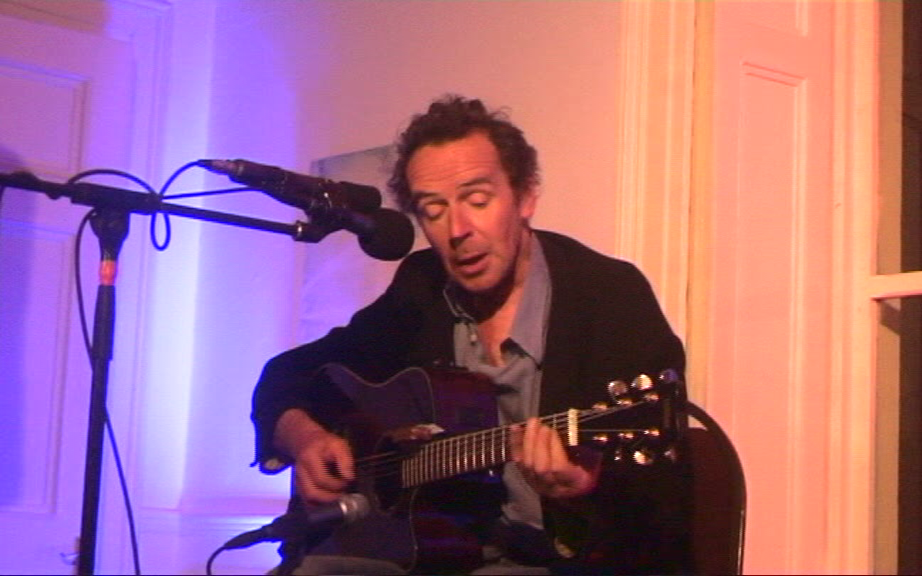
- Sonny Condell in concert with Tír na nÓg, performing his song "Teesside" at the Sirius Arts Centre in Cobh, Ireland on 21 August 2009.

Background information
- Born: Francis Robert Condell; 1 July 1949 (age 76); Newtownmountkennedy, County Wicklow, Ireland
- Genres: contemporary folk, folk rock, progressive folk
- Occupations: Musician, songwriter, graphic artist
- Instruments: Guitar, vocals, jaw harp, tbilat, clavinette, guitar synthesizer, saxophone, keyboards.
- Years active: 1960s – present
- Labels: Chrysalis, Mulligan Music, WEA, Dara Records, Kitten Records, STARC, Hummingbird Productions
- Member of: Tír na nÓg; Scullion
- Formerly of: Tramcarr 88; Radar
- Website: www.sonnycondell.com

Sonny Condell (born 1 July 1949, in Newtownmountkennedy, Ireland) is an Irish singer-songwriter, multi-instrumentalist, and graphic artist. He is mainly known as a member of the Irish bands Tír na nÓg and Scullion. He started a solo career from the mid-1970 – releasing his own albums while still playing, writing and recording with Tír na nÓg and Scullion over time.

== Discography ==
Solo

- Camouflage (1977)
- Someone to Dance With (1994)
- French Windows (1999)
- Backwater Awhile (2001)
- Swallows and Farms (2013)
- Seize the Day (2017)

With Tramcarr 88

- "Look"/"In the Morning" (1968)

With Tír na nÓg

- Tír na nÓg (1971)
- A Tear and a Smile (1972)
- Strong in the Sun (1973)
- In the Morning (1999)
- Hibernian (2000)
- Spotlight (2001)
- Live at Sirius (2010)
- The Dark Dance (2015)
- Live 1970 - '71 (2022)
- Love Lost - Live In Bremen 1973 (2023)

With Scullion

- Scullion (1979)
- Balance and Control (1980)
- White Side of Night (1983)
- Spin (1985)
- Ghosts and Heroes (1992)
- Eyelids into Snow – A Collection (2001)
- Long Wave (2012)
- Time Has Made a Change in Me (2022)

With Radar

- Navigation (2005)

As producer

- Tadhg Mac Dhonnagáin – Solas Gorm (1988)
- Mike Hanrahan – What You Know (2002)

Guest appearances

- Tudor Lodge – Tudor Lodge (1971)
- Ray Dolan – Restless Night (1975)
- Tadhg Mac Dhonnagáin – Solas Gorm (1988)
- Micha Marah – Voyage (1998)
- Mark Gilligan – Bang the Drum (2002)
- Conor Mahony - "Eyes Alive" (2003)
- Dervish – 21 Years from Stage to Stage (2010)
- Leo O'Kelly – Will (2011)
