= Leo O'Kelly =

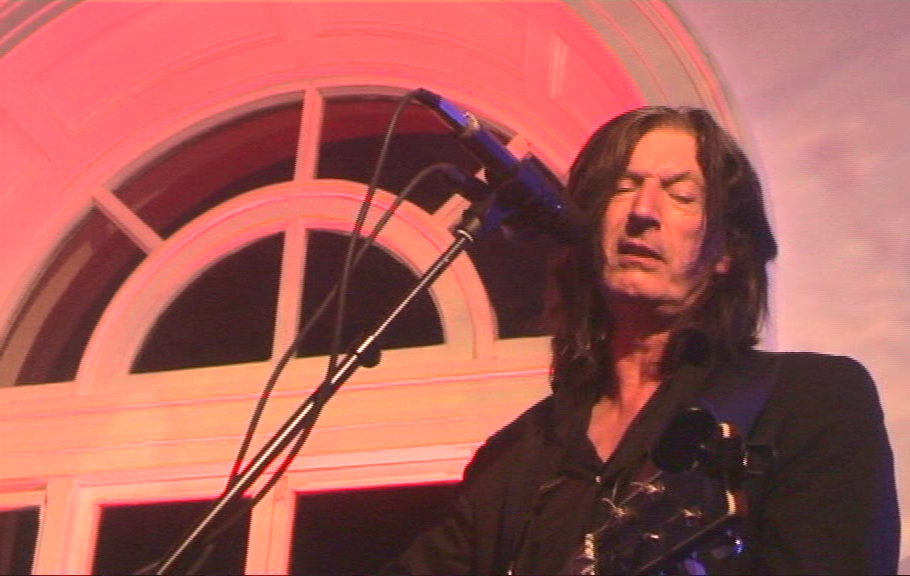
- Leo O'Kelly in concert with Tír na nÓg, performing his song "Daisy Lady" at the Sirius Arts Centre in Cobh, Ireland on 21 August 2009.

Background information
- Born: 27 November 1949 (age 75); Carlow, County Carlow, Ireland
- Genres: folk, progressive folk, folk rock, psychedelic rock, rock, techno, electro, New Beat
- Occupation(s): Musician, singer-songwriter, producer
- Instrument(s): Guitar, violin, vocals, bass guitar, tin whistle, dulcimer, synthesizer, bongos
- Years active: 1964–present
- Labels: Chrysalis, Polydor, EMI, Atco, Decca, Rykodisc, Radio Activ, Clarinda & 1st, Life & Living Records
- Member of: Tír na nÓg
- Formerly of: The Word; The Tropical Showband; Emmet Spiceland; Carrier Frequency; The Food Zebras
- Website: www.leookelly.ie

Leo O'Kelly (born 27 November 1949, Carlow, County Carlow, Ireland) is an Irish singer-songwriter, multi-instrumentalist, and producer. He is the co-founder of the Irish folk duo Tír na nÓg. After the band decided to split in 1974, he produced albums on Polydor and EMI labels for other Irish artists including Loudest Whisper, Ray Dolan or Gemma Hasson. Leo released his first solo album Glare in 2001. It was followed by Proto in 2003 which consists of songs recorded between 1975 and 2001. His third album, Will, was released in February 2011 and features poems of Liverpool writer John McKenna set to music. From 2020, O'Kelly started playing a live-streamed series of gigs.

== Discography ==
Solo

- Glare (2001)
- Proto (2003)
- Will (2011)
- "Portsmouth" from 10 Years On by various artists (1977)
- "Love Go Round" from Snakes & Ladders by various artists (1996)

With Tír na nÓg

- Tír na nÓg (1971)
- A Tear and a Smile (1972)
- Strong in the Sun (1973)
- In the Morning (1999)
- Hibernian (2000)
- Spotlight (2001)
- Live at Sirius (2010)
- The Dark Dance (2015)
- Live at the Half Moon (2016)
- Live 1970 - '71 (2022)
- Love Lost - Live In Bremen 1973 (2023)

With Carrier Frequency

- "Telecaster Man" (1989) 12" single

As producer

- Loudest Whisper – The Children of Lir (1974)
- Ray Dolan – Restless Night (1975)
- Gemma Hasson – Looking for the Morning (1975)
- Crubeen – Eagles Whistle (1976)
- The Sands Family – After the Morning (1976)
- Aileach – Ard Rí (1977)
- Various Artists – 10 Years On (1977)
- Various Artists – The Best of Irish Folk (1977)
- Azure Days – "Blew My Clouds Away"/"My Mexican" 7" single (1987)
