= Philip King (musician) =

Irish filmmaker and broadcaster (born 1952)

Philip King (born 1 May 1952 in Cork, Ireland) is an Irish musician, producer, filmmaker and broadcaster. As a vocalist and a harmonica player, he is a founding member of the band Scullion. He is noted for his knowledge of the roots of Irish music and culture and their cross-fertilisation with those of the United States. King is fluent in Irish and English.

== Career ==
As a musician, King has recorded seven albums. His version of the song "I Am Stretched on Your Grave" has been covered by Sinéad O'Connor on her album I Do Not Want What I Haven't Got and by Dead Can Dance on their album Toward the Within.

In 1987, he set up television production company Hummingbird Productions with Nuala O'Connor and Kieran Corrigan. The landmark television series Bringing It All Back Home won an Emmy Award in the United States in 1991, and in 1993 he was nominated for a Grammy Award for his music documentary Rocky World about the Canadian musician Daniel Lanois. King produced and directed Keeping Time, a film celebrating the poet Seamus Heaney and uilleann piper Liam O'Flynn, for BBC Television in 1998. He was appointed by the Minister for Arts, Sport and Tourism John O'Donoghue to the Special Committee on the Traditional Arts in December 2003.

King is also the maker of acclaimed television programmes about Irish music, including Other Voices. He was a member of the Arts Council of Ireland. He is also the series editor of the Tradition music series The Full Set. He produced a 90-minute television programme about violinist Nigel Kennedy and the Irish Chamber Orchestra, as well as a documentary on Kennedy. He executive produced the Irish Film & Television Award-winning film John McGahern – A Life, and produced Thomas Moore – One Faithful Harp for RTÉ television. He has also directed five series of Sé Mo Laoch for the TG4 television channel, documenting and archiving the lives of Ireland's most celebrated traditional musicians.

As a broadcaster, King presents South Wind Blows on RTÉ Radio 1.
