= List of TG4 Composers Award recipients =

List of award winning Composers

The TG4 Composer of the Year Award is given annually as part of Gradam Ceoil TG4 in Ireland.

The following is a list of the recipients of the award.

- 2001 – Paddy Fahey, County Galway
- 2002 – Brendan Tonra, County Mayo
- 2003 – Vincent Broderick, County Galway
- 2004 – Richie Dwyer, County Cork
- 2005 – Josephine Keegan, County Armagh
- 2006 – Charlie Lennon, County Leitrim
- 2007 – Jim McGrath, County Fermanagh
- 2008 – Peadar Ó Riada, Dublin
- 2009 – Con Fada Ó Drisceoil, County Cork
- 2010 – John Dwyer & Finbarr Dwyer, County Cork
- 2011 – Liz Carroll, Chicago, United States
- 2012 – Paddy O'Brien, County Offaly
- 2013 – Tommy Peoples, County Donegal
- 2017 – Michael Rooney, County Monaghan
- 2019 – Tríona Ní Dhomhnaill, County Meath
- 2020 – Josephine Marsh, County Clare
- 2021 – Steve Cooney, Co. Donegal
- 2022 – Connie O'Connell, Co. Cork
- 2023 – Maurice Lennon, Co. Leitrim
- 2024 – Ryan Molloy, Co. Tyrone
- 2025 – Johnny Óg Connolly Co.Galway

TG4 Musical Collaboration Award

- 2014 – The Goodman Project
- 2015 – Ensemble Ériu
- 2016 – Our Dear Dark Mountain with the Sky Over It
- 2018 – CONCERT
