= High Kings of Tara =

Compilation album (Sampler)
- Released: 1980
- Genre: Irish folk music
- Label: Tara Music TARA 3003
- Producer: Various

Professional ratings
Review scores
Source	Rating
Allmusic	4.5/5 stars

High Kings of Tara is a compilation album from Tara Music, showcasing tracks previously released by some of its artists: Shaun Davey, Oisín, Jolyon Jackson, Paddy Glackin, Paddy Keenan, Stockton's Wing and Christy Moore.

This album also included five previously unreleased tracks by Planxty, Moore and Andy Irvine. Two of these, Irvine's "The Bonny Light Horseman" and a set of reels by Planxty, "Lord McDonald/The Chattering Magpie", were added later on to the CD version of After The Break.

The remaining three tracks were:

- "General Monroe", a traditional song re-arranged by Irvine in duet with Dónal Lunny, about Henry Munro who led the insurgents of County Down in the 1798 rebellion and who, defeated at the battle of Ballynahinch on 13 June of that year, was hanged in front of his house three days later.

This song was never re-released on CD.

- "First Slip/Hardyman The Fiddler A&B/The Yellow Wattle", a set of jigs by Planxty, including Matt Molloy; this was never re-released either.
- "John of Dreams", a ballad by Moore, which was later re-released on the CD version of The Iron Behind the Velvet under the slightly different title of "John O'Dreams".

== Track listing ==
Side One

1. "The Bonny Light Horseman" – Planxty
2. "Pride of the Herd" – Shaun Davey (courtesy of CBS Records)
3. "General Monroe" – Andy Irvine
4. "First Slip/Hardyman The Fiddler A&B/The Yellow Wattle" – Planxty
5. "The Next Market Day" – Oisín (from the album Over the Moor to Maggie, TARA 2012)

Side Two

1. "The Long Note" – Paddy Glackin and Jolyon Jackson (from the album Hidden Ground, TARA 2009)
2. "John of Dreams" – Christy Moore
3. "The Boyne Hunt/Toss the Feathers" – Paddy Glackin & Paddy Keenan (from the album Doublin, TARA 2007)
4. "Maid Behind the Bar" – Stockton's Wing (from the album Stockton's Wing, TARA 2004)
5. "The Sun is Burning" – Christy Moore (from the album The Iron Behind the Velvet, TARA 2002)
6. "Lord McDonald/The Chattering Magpie" – Planxty
