= Brick hod =

Material-handling equipment

Twin brothers Albert and Ebenezer Fox each holding a hod

A brick hod is a three-sided box for carrying bricks or other building materials, often mortar. It bears a long handle and is carried over the shoulder. A hod is usually long enough to accept four bricks on their side. However, by arranging the bricks in a chevron fashion, the number of bricks that may be carried is only limited to the weight the labourer can bear and the unwieldiness of that load. Typically, ten to twelve bricks might be carried.

Hod carrying is a labouring occupation in the building industry. Typically the hod carrier or 'hoddie' will be employed by a bricklaying team in a supporting role to the bricklayers. Two bricklayers for each hod carrier is typical. A hoddie's duties might include wetting the mortar boards on the scaffolding, prior to fetching bricks from the delivery pallet using his hod and bringing them to 2x2 wide 'stacks' upon the scaffold that may then be easily laid by the bricklayers. The carrier should plan the deliveries of bricks with deliveries of mortar—also carried in the hod—to ensure the bricklayers can maintain a constant work rate. At sites without premixed mortar, the mortar will also be mixed by the hod carrier. Bricks may be cut and assistance given to 'rake out' the mortar joints, if that coursing joint form is required, or in re-pointing work. A bricklayer under ideal conditions can lay as many as 500 bricks a day; if the hod carrier is serving a team of two then he must move 1,000 bricks although it is not uncommon for experienced hod carriers to serve three bricklayers. The World Record for moving 500 bricks by hod is 12 minutes and was set by Daren Whitmore on 12 February 2011.

== Song references ==
- In the song Never Any Good, Martin Simpson describes his father as "not steady enough for the office, not hard enough for the hod."
- In the Irish folk song "Finnegan's Wake", the line "...to rise in the world he carried a hod", suggests that Tim Finnegan worked as a hod carrier; hod is also a slang term for a drinking vessel.
- In the song "The Sick Note" by Pat Cooksey (performed by many), the narrator of the song is told to cart a load of bricks down fourteen floors "in me hod".
- The song "Seven Days of the Week" by Ewan MacColl and Peggy Seeger mentions "the poor old sod who'd built the world and carried the hod".
- In the song "McAlpine's Fusiliers" it says of Sir Robert McAlpine, "...McAlpine's God is a well-filled hod".
- In the song "Missing You" by Jimmy MacCarthy has the line "Your best mate’s a spade and he carries a hod".
- The song "Hansel and Gretel" by Jerry Jeff Walker with the group Circus Maximus mentions "the stone walking away from the hod".
- The song "Building Up And Tearing England Down" by Christy Moore and Dominic Behan mentions "And I used to think that God made the mixer, pick and hod".

== Other cultural references ==
- One of the two main characters in Roald Dahl's short story The Hitch-Hiker claims to be "an 'odcarrier."
- Don Wilson, guitarist, was a hod carrier before he became a founding member of The Ventures with his bricklayer friend guitarist, Bob Bogle and from there it was "Walk: Don't Run!" to The Rock and Roll Hall of Fame.
- Daniel Defoe, in Robinson Crusoe, describes how Robinson, not knowing how to build a wheel-barrow or basket, finally builds a tool similar to a "hodd", "which the labourers carry morter in when they serve the bricklayers".
- Matt Talbot, an Irish layman and Venerable in the Catholic Church, was a hod carrier for a time.
