= Tara Music =

Traditional Irish music recording companies

Tara Music Company
- Founded: circa 1972
- Founder: John Cook, Jack Fitzgerald
- Status: Active
- Genre: Celtic, Traditional Irish
- Country of origin: Ireland
- Location: Dublin

Tara Music (formerly known as Tara Records) is a traditional Irish music recording company. The label was set up by Jack Fitzgerald and John Cook in the early 1970s.

The label's first release was the album Prosperous by a young Christy Moore, still largely unknown at the time. There was quite a gap between that album coming out and anything further being released. Then, in the early 1980s, the label released two albums from Planxty (After The Break and The Woman I Loved So Well), two further solo albums from Moore (The Iron Behind the Velvet and Live In Dublin), as well as two albums from Clannad (Crann Úll and Fuaim), followed by the first of numerous albums from Stockton's Wing.

In the late 1970s, Tara recorded Shaun Davey's The Brendan Voyage, an album which featured uilleann piper Liam O'Flynn as a soloist with a full orchestra. The Brendan Voyage launched Davey as a contemporary orchestral composer of international standard and led to further commissions for work in a similar vein, several of which (The Pilgrim, Granuaile and The Relief of Derry Symphony) have been released on the Tara label. Most of Davey's works feature O'Flynn and vocalist Rita Connolly, both of whom have also recorded numerous solo albums for the Tara label under Davey's supervision as producer.

The Irish phenomenon that is Riverdance has musical roots that had been developing over many years prior to the first performance of Riverdance at Eurovision song contest in 1994. These roots included musical elements introduced by Andy Irvine who, having returned to Ireland from the Balkans, introduced Eastern European music and time signatures to the group Planxty, who then proceeded to record a number of these instrumental pieces. Irvine and Davy Spillane also recorded the East Wind album, which was produced by Bill Whelan, possibly the first seeds of what became Riverdance.

Tara Music also released Whelan's first major orchestral work, The Seville Suite and his most recent release: The Connemara Suite. Other albums, such as Spillane's Out of the Air and Pipedreams, as well as The Storm by Moving Hearts, feature some of the musical elements and instruments that are easily recognizable in their influence on the Riverdance music.

In recent years, many releases on the Tara Music label are recordings by self-produced artists, with Tara Music acting as distributor and coordinating press and publicity. Albums by artists such as: Frankie Gavin & De Dannan, The Voice Squad, Zoë Conway, Máirtín O'Connor and Michelle Lally are available on the Tara Music label.

== Catalogue ==
Cat. No.	Title	Artist
TARA1002/9	The Best of Irish Piping	Seamus Ennis
TARA2002	The Iron Behind the Velvet	Christy Moore
TARA2004	Stockton's Wing	Stockton's Wing
TARA2005	Live In Dublin	Christy Moore
TARA2006	Noel Hill & Tony Linnane	Noel Hill & Tony Linnane
TARA2007	Doublin'	Paddy Glackin & Paddy Keenan
TARA2008	Prosperous	Christy Moore
TARA2017	Out of the Air	Davy Spillane Band
TARA3001	After The Break	Planxty
TARA3003	High Kings of Tara	Planxty & Other artists
TARA3004	Take A Chance	Stockton's Wing
TARA3005	The Woman I Loved So Well	Planxty
TARA3006	The Brendan Voyage	Shaun Davey / Liam O'Flynn
TARA3007	Crann Ull	Clannad
TARA3008	Fuaim	Clannad
TARA3014	The Storm	Moving Hearts
TARA3015	Memories of Ireland	The Emerald Isle Singers
TARA3017	Granuaile	Shaun Davey / Rita Connolly
TARA3018	Classic Irish Ballads	Diarmuid O'Leary & The Bards
TARA3019	Atlantic Bridge	Davy Spillane
TARA3023	Shadow Hunter	Davy Spillane
TARA3024	The Relief of Derry Symphony	Shaun Davey
TARA3025	Anam	Clannad
TARA3026	Pipedreams	Davy Spillane
TARA3027	EastWind	Andy Irvine & Davy Spillane
TARA3028	The Crooked Rose	Stockton's Wing
TARA3029	Rita Connolly	Rita Connolly
TARA3030	The Seville Suite	Bill Whelan
TARA3031	Out To An Other Side	Liam O'Flynn
TARA3032	The Pilgrim	Shaun Davey
TARA3033	Valparaiso	Rita Connolly
TARA3034	The Given Note	Liam O'Flynn
TARA3035	Causeway	Nollaig Casey & Arty McGlynn
TARA3036	Letting Go	Stockton's Wing
TARA3037	The Piper's Call	Liam O'Flynn
TARA3038	Brian Boru - The High King of Tara	Maurice Lennon
TARA3039	Masters Of Their Craft	Compilation
TARA4	Collection	Stockton's Wing
TARA4004	Many's The Foolish Youth	The Voice Squad
TARA4005	Happy Ever After - Deleted	The Fallen Angels
TARA4006	Blood & Gold - Deleted	MACA
TARA4007	From The Edge of Memory	Phil Callery
TARA4008	Josephine Marsh	Josephine Marsh
TARA4010	Mosaic	Alan Kelly
TARA4011	Fierce Traditional	Frankie Gavin
TARA4012	Zoe Conway	Zoe Conway
TARA4013	Holly Wood	The Voice Squad
TARA4014	Spirit of an Irish Christmas	Roisin Dempsey
TARA4015	Aisling Na nGael	Emma Kate Tobia
TARA4016	Stockton's Wing Live – Take One	Stockton's Wing
TARA4017	May We Never Have To Say Goodbye	Shaun Davey
TARA4018	The Horses Tail	Zoe Conway
TARA4019	If This Be Love	Michelle Lally
TARA4020	The Full Score	Frankie Gavin & Hibernian Rhapsody
TARA4021	The Conemara Suite	Bill Whelan
TARA4022	Live at St. James Church Dingle	Beal Tuinne
TARA4023	Voices from the Merry Cemetery	Shaun Davey
TARA4024	Jigs, Reels & Rock n' Roll	Frankie Gavin & De Dannan
TARA4025	Go Mairir i bhFad – Long Life to You	Zoë Conway & John Mc Intyre
TARA9003	Best of Irish Ballads	John Ahern

== Bibliography ==
Long, Harry (2005). Waltons Guide to Irish Music. Ireland: Waltons Publishing. ISBN 18-5720-177-9.

Harper, Colin; Hodgett, Trevor (2005). Irish Folk, Trad and Blues: A Secret History. London: Cherry Red Books. ISBN 19-0144-740-5.
