= Miles of Eyes =

Single by Jimmy MacCarthy
- Released: 1981
- Genre: Irish folk
- Length: 6:56
- Label: Mulligan Records

Miles of Eyes is the debut single released by Irish singer/songwriter Jimmy MacCarthy in 1981 under Mulligan Records.

== Summary ==
This song was Jimmy's first single before writing songs that became hits for many other popular Irish artists such as Christy Moore, Mary Black and Maura O'Connell in the years that followed.

== Release and Reception ==
While not a chart success “Miles of Eyes” was considered a ‘turntable hit’ due to its incessant airplay on Irish radio for five weeks. Although it was not initially a substantial help to Jimmy's popularity, it was favoured in retrospect by Irish music critics years later when he gained acknowledgement as a songwriter for other artists. In 1988, “Miles of Eyes” was covered as a single by Linda Martin and performed on the RTE programme “Live at Three” to renewed recognition. Upon the release of his debut album The Song of the Singing Horseman in 1991, “Miles of Eyes” was acclaimed as a significant point in Jimmy's writing career.

== Track listing ==
1. Miles of Eyes
2. Shuffle Of The Buckled
