= The Given Note =

Studio album by Liam O'Flynn
- Released: 1995
- Recorded: Windmill Lane Studios Dublin
- Genre: Celtic, Traditional Irish
- Length: 62:46
- Label: Tara Music label
- Producer: Shaun Davey

Liam O'Flynn chronology
Out to an Other Side (1993)	The Given Note (1995)	The Piper's Call (1999)

The Given Note is the fourth solo album by master uilleann piper and prominent Irish traditional musician Liam O'Flynn. Produced by Shaun Davey and recorded at Windmill Lane Studios in Dublin, the album was released in 1995. The title was suggested by O'Flynn's good friend Seamus Heaney, winner of the 1995 Nobel Prize for Literature. Heaney also wrote a tribute to O'Flynn which is on the sleeve notes of the album.

== Critical response ==
Professional ratings
Review scores
Source	Rating
AllMusic	3/5 stars

In his review for AllMusic, Chris Nickson called the album "an object lesson in the way [Celtic] music should be played in the 1990s". Nickson observes that despite O'Flynn covering the full Celtic music spectrum, it is the Irish songs that "lie closest to O'Flynn's heart". Nickson concludes:

A master uillean pipe and whistle player, O'Flynn's magic is apparent right from the first notes of "O'Farrell's Welcome to Limerick," which daringly also includes some growling bass and didgeridu. ... Equally adept on both his instruments, O'Flynn is a virtuoso who can dazzle on the whistle with "The Rambler, the Aherlow Jig" and move with some wonderfully lyrical phrasing on the slow air "The Girl of Brown Hair."

== Track listing ==
1. "O'Farrell's Welcome to Limerick" – 4:07
2. "O'Rourke's, the Merry Sisters, Colonel Fraser" – 3:36
3. "Come With Me over the Mountain, a Smile in the Dark" – 4:34
4. "Farewell to Govan" – 4:00
5. "Joyce's Tune" – 4:41
6. "The Green Island, Spellan the Fiddler" – 3:50
7. "Foliada de Elviña" – 4:06
8. "Ag Taisteal Na Blárnan (Travelling Through Blarney)" – 4:10
9. "The Rambler, the Aherlow Jig" – 3:26
10. "The Smith's a Gallant Fireman" – 3:02
11. "Romeo's Exile" – 3:52
12. "The Rocks of Bawn" – 6:07
13. "Cailín na Gruaige Doinne (The Girl of the Brown Hair)" – 3:53
14. "Teño un Amor Na Montaña, Alborada - Unha Noite no Santo Cristo" – 9:22

== Personnel ==
- Liam O'Flynn – uilleann pipes, whistle
- Arty McGlynn – guitar
- Steve Cooney – guitar, bass guitar, didgeridoo
- Rod McVey – synthesizers, Hammond organ, harmonium
- Noel Eccles – percussion
- Sean Keane – fiddle
- Rodrigo Romani (Milladoiro) – harp
- Xose V. Ferreirós (Milladoiro) – Galician gaita, tambourine, oboe
- Nando Casal (Milladoiro) – Galician gaita, clarinet
- Ciaran Mordaunt – side drums (track 10)
- Andy Irvine – vocals, mandolin
- Paul Brady – vocals, mandolin, piano
