= Rita Connolly (album) =

Studio album by Rita Connolly
- Released: 1992
- Recorded: Westland Studios & Windmill Lane Studios, Dublin, Ireland
- Genre: Celtic Music
- Label: Tara Music label
- Producer: Shaun Davey & Rita Connolly

Rita Connolly chronology
Rita Connolly (1992)	Valparaiso (1995)

Professional ratings
Review scores
Source	Rating
Allmusic	4.5/5 stars

Rita Connolly is the first solo recording by Rita Connolly. It features guest appearances by Davy Spillane, Liam O'Flynn, The Voice Squad, Máirtín O'Connor, Palle Mikkelborg, Ray Lynam, amidst others. The album includes a number of Connolly's own compositions.

== Track listing ==
1. "Venezuela" – 4:49 (Traditional; arranged by R Connolly/S Davey)
2. "Miracles" – 4:21 (Shaun Davey)
3. "Factory Girl / Same Old Man" – 4:21 (Traditional; arranged by R Connolly/S Davey)
4. "Stormy Weather" – 4:35 (Harold Arlen, Ted Koehler)
5. "Alice in Jericho" – 4:26 (Thom Moore)
6. "Fanny Hawke" – 3:41 (Words: Sebastian Barry–Music: Shaun Davey)
7. "It's Really Pouring" – 4:45 (Rita Connolly)
8. "Two of Us" – 4:14 (Lennon–McCartney Northern Songs)
9. "Amiens" – 3:01 (Shaun Davey)
10. "Red Dust" – 5:31 (Rita Connolly)
11. "Dreams in the Morning" – 6:02 (Shaun Davey)
12. "Close Your Eyes" – 3:31 (Rita Connolly)

== Personnel ==
- Rita Connolly - Vocals
- Shaun Davey - Keyboards, vocals.
- Davy Spillane - Low whistle
- Palle Mikkelborg - Trumpet, Flugelhorn
- Helen Davies - Harp
- Máirtín O'Connor - Button Accordion
- Liam O'Flynn - Uilleann pipes
- Ray Lynam - Vocals
- The Voice Squad - Vocals
- The Wind Machine - Brass
- Paul Mc Ateer / Paul Moran, Drums
- Eoghan O'Neill / John Drummond / Tony Molloy - Bass
- Des Moore / Greg Boland / Gerry O'Beirne / Philip Donnelly / Anthony Drennan - Guitars
- James Delaney - Keyboards
- Jack Bayle / Sean Fleming -Trombone
- William Dowdal - Flute
- Inez Connolly / Ursula Connolly / Peter Connolly - Vocals
- Members Of The National Philharmonic Choir.

=== Production ===
- Produced by : Shaun Davey & Rita Connolly.
- Engineered & Mixed by : Bill Somerville Large.
- Additional Engineering : John Grimes, Brian Masterson.
- Engineering Assistants : Sarah McCann, Lorcan Roche, Stephen Rushe.
- Recorded at : Westland Studios, Dublin and Windmill Lane Studios, Dublin.
