= Jolyon Jackson =

- Birth name: Jolyon Jackson
- Born: 3 September 1948
- Origin: Malaya
- Died: 18 December 1985 (aged 37)
- Genres: Irish folk music Theatre music
- Occupation(s): Musician, composer, arranger
- Instrument(s): Cello, piano, organ, synthesizer, recorder
- Years active: 1968–1985
- Labels: Mulligan, Tara

Jolyon Jackson (3 September 1948 – 18 December 1985) was an Irish musician and composer.

== Life ==
Jackson was born in Malaya where his father, Patrick Jackson, was Deputy Commissioner of the police and would receive the CBE. His father was from County Limerick, of a Cork family; his mother was the singer Charmian Jenkinson. They lived at Poul-na-murrish, Annamoe, County Wicklow.

He was educated in Salisbury Cathedral School and Bradfield College, Reading. He studied at Trinity College Dublin in the late 1960s, where he graduated in Arts and Music. He integrated himself into the musical life of Dublin, first with the group 'Jazz Therapy', and later with 'Supply, Demand and Curve.' He played cello, recorder and keyboards–including organ, piano and synthesizer.

He married Teresa Le Jeune from Delgany, County Wicklow and they had a son, Linus.

Jackson died in London of Hodgkin's lymphoma on 18 December 1985, aged 37.

== Music ==
The band 'Supply, Demand & Curve' was formed in 1970 and initially consisted of Jackson, Brian Masterson—who had played with Jackson in 'Jazz Therapy' during 1968–69—and Paddy Finney. They had a weekly gig at the Project Arts Centre and later played mainly in folk clubs in Dublin and beyond.

With a line-up of Jackson, Masterson, Finney and Roger Doyle—who had also been in 'Jazz Therapy'—they undertook a tour of Canada in 1973. Rosemarie Taylor (keyboards and vocals) and other musicians joined them off and on over the years.

They released their eponymous album in 1976 on the Mulligan label (LUN 009). It contained eleven tracks, ten of which were composed by Jackson. It had taken several years of snatched studio time to complete, and included contributions from some musicians who were no longer in the band by the time the LP was released.

Other recordings on which Jackson featured include Camouflage by Sonny Condell, and Taylormaid by Rosemarie Taylor—both released on Mulligan in 1977. He subsequently appeared as a guest musician on albums by The Chieftains, Midnight Well, Christy Moore, Terry and Gay Woods, and also reunited with Doyle who, by then, had created the music-theatre company Operating Theatre with Irish actress Olwen Fouéré.

Jackson was an early adopter of home-recording, buying an eight-track recorder and setting up a studio at his home in Dún Laoghaire, where he recorded the seminal album Hidden Ground (Tara 1980) with fiddle player Paddy Glackin, on which he arranged the music and also played all the instruments surrounding the fiddle.

Compositions for television include the RTÉ series Hands, Visions of Transport and To the Waters and the Wild.

Jackson also involved himself in music for the theatre, most notably in the music for the W. B. Yeats trilogy based on the Saga of Cú Chulainn, performed in the Noh style and directed by Hideo Kanze at the Abbey Theatre. Later on, he also composed music to accompany the exercises of the Gurdjieff movements.

== Discography ==
With Roger Doyle

- Oizzo No (1975)

With Supply, Demand & Curve

- Supply, Demand & Curve (1976)

With Sonny Condell

- Camouflage (1977)

With Jimmy Crowley

- The Boys of Fair Hill (1977)

With Midnight Well

- Midnight Well (1977)

With Christy Moore

- The Iron Behind the Velvet (1978)

With Gay & Terry Woods

- Tender Hooks (1978)

With The Chieftains

- The Chieftains 9: Boil the Breakfast Early (1979)
- The Best of The Chieftains (2002)

With Paddy Glackin

- Hidden Ground (1980)
  by Paddy Glackin and Jolyon Jackson, Tara 2009

With Scullion

- Balance and Control (1980)

Compilation albums

- High Kings of Tara (1980)
  by Planxty & Various artists from the Tara label

With Operating Theatre

- Miss Mauger (1983)
- The Early Years (2007)
