= Out to an Other Side =

Studio album by Liam O'Flynn
- Released: 1993
- Recorded: Windmill Lane Studios, Dublin
- Genre: Celtic, Traditional Irish
- Length: 52:33
- Label: Tara Music
- Producer: Shaun Davey

Liam O'Flynn chronology
Out to an Other Side (1993)	The Given Note (1995)

Out to an Other Side is the third solo album by master uilleann piper and prominent Irish traditional musician Liam O'Flynn. Produced by Shaun Davey and recorded at Windmill Lane Studios in Dublin, Ireland, the album was released on the Tara Music label in 1993. As with a number of Liam's other album titles, Out to an Other Side comes from the writing of Nobel Laureate Seamus Heaney with whom Liam has performed live on numerous occasions.

== Critical response ==
Professional ratings
Review scores
Source	Rating
AllMusic	4.5/5 stars

AllMusic gave the album four and a half out of five stars, calling it O'Flynn's "most eclectic album" featuring "solo tracks as well as folk revival and orchestral arrangements".

== Track listing ==
All songs are Traditional, except where noted.

1. "The Foxchase" – 9:5
2. "The Wild Geese" – 5:51
3. "The Dean's Pamphlet" – 3:55
4. "Gynt at the Gate" (Shaun Davey) – 4:33
5. "The Winter's End" (Shaun Davey) – 3:22
6. "After Aughrim's Great Disaster" – 3:21
7. "Blackwells" (Shaun Davey) – 4:08
8. "Ar Bhruach na Laoi" – 6:11
9. "Lady Dillon" – 4:13
10. "Dollards and the Harlequin Hornpipes" – 3:10
11. "Sean O Duibhir a Ghleanna – 3:59

== Personnel ==
- Liam O'Flynn – uilleann piper (in D, C#, and C), whistle
- Bill Dowdall – flute, piccolo
- Matthew Manning – oboe, Cor anglais
- Carl Geraghty – saxophone
- Fergus O'Carroll – French horn
- Graham Hastings – trumpet, flugelhorn
- Noel Eccles – percussion
- Arty McGlynn – guitar
- Des Moore – guitar
- Helen Davies – Irish harp
- Sean Keane – violin
- Nollaig Casey – violin, viola
- Adele O'Dwyer – cello
- Joe Czibi jnr. – double bass
- Rod McVey – synthesizer
- Peter Connolly – electric bass
- Steve Cooney – electric bass
- Paul McAteer – drums
- The Voice Squad – vocals
- Rita Connolly – vocals
- Liam Ó Maonlaí – vocals
