= The Moment (Jimmy MacCarthy album) =

Studio album by Jimmy MacCarthy
- Released: 2002
- Genre: Folk
- Label: Ride On Records
- Producer: Pat O' Donnell, Jimmy MacCarthy

Jimmy MacCarthy chronology
The Dreamer (1994)	The Moment (2002)	Hey-Ho Believe (2010)

The Moment is the third album by Irish singer/songwriter Jimmy MacCarthy, released in 2002 by his own record label, Ride On Records.

== Track listing ==
1. "The Music of Love" - 4:18
2. "The Moment" - 3:22
3. "Juggler" - 4:04
4. "Original Doubt" - 4:11
5. "Baby's Broken Heart" - 3:16
6. "Change In A Minute" - 3:24
7. "Still In Love" - 4:24
8. "The Contender" - 3:08
9. "My Singing Bird" - 2:46
10. "Love Don't Fail Me" - 4:23
11. "Don't You Still Smile" - 3:16
