= The Pilgrim (Shaun Davey album) =

Live album by Composer Shaun Davey Soloists Liam O'Flynn, Rita Connolly, et al
- Released: 1983
- Recorded: Festival Interceltique de Lorient, Glasgow Royal Concert Hall
- Genre: Celtic music
- Label: Tara Music
- Producer: Shaun Davey

Professional ratings
Review scores
Source	Rating
Allmusic	link

The Pilgrim is a live album by the composer Shaun Davey. It was recorded at Festival Interceltique de Lorient, Glasgow Royal Concert Hall.

== Background ==
In 1983, following the successful performance of Shaun Davey's work The Brendan Voyage the previous year, The Festival Interceltique de Lorient commissioned Davey to compose The Lorient Festival Suite for orchestra and Celtic soloists representing the seven Celtic countries or regions (Scotland, Ireland, Isle of Man, Wales, Cornwall, Brittany, Galicia) and it was a recording of this concert that was released, on vinyl, in the same year by Tara Music under the title of The Pilgrim. Despite the success of the initial performance and subsequent LP release Davey realised that the work needed a thread to hold it together. It was not until 1990, when Davey was approached by Glasgow Royal Concert Hall to stage The Pilgrim in Glasgow to mark the passing of the mantle of European City of Culture from Glasgow to Dublin, that he got the chance to address some of these problems. With the commitment to a CD release from Tara Music, he was in a position to add some new pieces (and delete others). He introduced the concept of a journey by St. Colum Cille through the Celtic countries which provided the missing thread from the earlier work. This concept was further strengthened by the introduction of a narrator between the musical pieces.

== Recording ==
The current CD release is a combination of remixed recordings from the original Lorient concert as well as the Glasgow concert.

With a number of performances scheduled for the piece in the millennium year, Shaun took the opportunity to revise and extend the suite. As the overall length of the suite was now beyond that of a conventional CD, the additional tracks were on a later release 'May We Never Have To Goodbye' also on the Tara Music label.

== Tracks ==
1. Himlico's Map; Colm Cille Leaves Derry.
2. Gair Na Gairbe
3. A Walk In The Ocean
4. The Pilgrim
5. Colum Cille's Farewell to Ireland
6. The Land of The Picts
7. Iona
8. Briochan and Columba
9. Storm at Sea
10. A White Wave Foams Over
11. Ymadawiad Arthur
12. St. Manchan's Prayer
13. Samson Peccator Episcopus
14. St. Matthews Point
15. Danse Plin
16. Bal Plin
17. Dance An Dro
18. Santiago
19. Vigo
20. The Deer's Cry
21. God Be With Me
22. A`Ghrian'

== Musicians ==
- Conductors : Noel Kelehan / Iain Sutherland
- Orchestras : The Lorient Festival Orchestra / The Glasgow Philharmonic Orchestra
- Soloists; Rita Connolly & Iarla O'Lionaird (vocals) Liam O'Flynn uilleann pipes, Josik Allot & Bernard Pichard Bombardes, Pipe Major Tom Anderson (Scottish pipes), Helen Davies (Celtic harp), Carlos Real Rodreguez, Vincente Manuel Tunas.
- Narrator : Mick Lally.
- Choirs : Cord Gord' rer Garth' Kerensa, An Tryskell, The City of Glasgow Chorus.
- Pipebands : Wallacestone Pipeband. City of Glasgow Pipes and Drums.
