= The Iron Behind the Velvet =

Album by Christy Moore

Studio album by Christy Moore
- Released: 1978
- Recorded: Dublin
- Genre: Folk
- Length: 51:07
- Label: Tara Music
- Producer: Christy Moore, Dónal Lunny, Brian Masterson

Christy Moore chronology
Christy Moore (1976)	The Iron Behind the Velvet (1978)	Live in Dublin (1981)

The Iron Behind the Velvet is an album recorded by Christy Moore in 1978, after the first breakup of Planxty. It was produced jointly by Brian Masterson and Moore, and recorded and mixed at Lombard and Keystone Studios, Dublin.

It features his brother Barry Moore (Luka Bloom) on guitar & vocals, as well as Planxty's Andy Irvine on mandolin, bouzouki, vocals and more. Also appearing are Noel Hill on concertinas, Tony Linnane on fiddle, Gabriel McKeon on Uilleann pipes, Jimmy Faulkner on guitars and Rosemary Flanagan on cello.

The final track on the present CD, "John O'Dreams", was produced by Dónal Lunny and recorded at Windmill Lane Studios in 1980; therefore, it did not originally feature on the 33 rpm, vinyl LP version of The Iron Behind the Velvet.

Instead, the song was first released—under the title "John of Dreams"—on the compilation album High Kings of Tara, then subsequently re-released on the CD version of The Iron Behind the Velvet. Lunny (bouzouki, synthesizer) and Jolyon Jackson (cello, synthesizer) accompanied Moore (vocals, guitar) on the recording of this track.

== Track listing ==
1. "Patrick was a Gentleman / Irvine's Polka (Walls of Limerick)" (Andy Irvine, Christy Moore)
2. "The Sun is Burning" (Ian Campbell)
3. "Morrissey and the Russian Sailor" (Traditional; arranged by Christy Moore)
4. "The Foxy Devil" ('Galway Joe' Dolan)
5. "Three Reels: The Newly Mowed Meadow / Farrell O'Gara's Reel / No Name Reel" (Traditional)
6. "Trip to Jerusalem ('Galway Joe' Dolan) / The Mullingar Races / The Crooked Road"
7. "Three Reels: Tommy Coen's / The Youngest Daughter / Flax in Bloom" (Tommy Coen/Traditional/Traditional)
8. "Patrick's Arrival" (Christy Moore)
9. "Gabriel McKeon's: Cailin Deas Cruaite na mBo / Gilbert Clancy's " (Traditional)
10. "Dunlavin Green" (Christy Moore)
11. "Joe McCann" (Éamonn O'Doherty)
12. "John O'Dreams" (Bill Caddick) (*)

(*) Bonus track, first released on the 1980 compilation album High Kings of Tara and subsequently added to the CD version of The Iron Behind the Velvet.

== Personnel ==
- Christy Moore – vocals, guitar, bouzouki, bodhrán
- Andy Irvine – mandolin, harmonica, waldzither, dulcimer, bouzouki and vocals
- Barry Moore (Luka Bloom) – guitar and vocals
- Noel Hill – concertinas (C/G and Bb/F systems)
- Tony Linnane – fiddle
- Gabriel McKeon – Uilleann pipes (concert set and C set)
- Jimmy Faulkner – electric, acoustic and slide guitars
- Rosemary Flanagan – cello
- Dónal Lunny – guitar and synthesizer (on "John O'Dreams")
- Jolyon Jackson – cello and synthesizer (on "John O'Dreams")
