= Maurice Lennon =

Irish fiddler and composer (born 1958)

- Born: 1958 (age 67–68); Limerick, Munster, Ireland
- Occupations: Musician; composer
- Instruments: Fiddle; viola
- Years active: 1980s–present
- Label: Tara
- Member of: Stockton's Wing
- Relatives: Charlie Lennon (uncle)

Maurice Lennon (born 1958) is an Irish fiddler and composer.

== Biography ==
Born in Limerick in 1958, Lennon grew up in a musical family, the son of the fiddler Ben Lennon and nephew of the composer, fiddler and pianist Charlie Lennon.

He won the senior All-Ireland fiddle title, aged 18.

He began his professional career, and first came to prominence, in the 1980s as a founding member of Stockton's Wing, as a fiddle and viola player, and a composer of some of their popular tunes. These include "The Belltable Waltz" (with Kieran Hanrahan), "The Woody Island", "The Masters Daughter", "Eastwood", and "The Golden Stud". Other well-known compositions of his include "The Road to Garrison", "Stone of Destiny", "A Tribute to Larry Reynolds" and "If Ever You Were Mine".

His credentials as a composer were solidified with his 2001 suite Brian Boru the High King of Tara, released by Tara Records. The album was produced by Dónal Lunny and includes contributions from Máirtín O'Connor and Mick O'Brien.

In 2013, he released his first solo fiddle album, The Little Ones, which contains several of his compositions. He was musical director for the popular dance show Ragus and toured with singer-songwriter Finbar Furey for six years.

He has lived in Chicago for many years, and a benefit concert was held for him at Chicago's Irish American Heritage Center in 2012.

== Honours ==
- 2017: Freedom of County Clare, alongside Stockton's Wing bandmates
- 2011: iBAM Musician of the Year, Irish American Heritage Centre
- 2023: Gradam Ceoil TG4 award for composition
