= The Best of Irish Piping =

Box set by Séamus Ennis
- Released: 1974
- Recorded: Dublin
- Genre: Celtic
- Label: Tara Music label
- Producer: Séamus Ennis

Professional ratings
Review scores
Source	Rating
Allmusic	link

The Best of Irish Piping is a two CD boxset incorporating The Pure Drop and The Fox Chase albums by Séamus Ennis. Liam O'Flynn wrote the sleevenotes.

== Tracks ==
The Pure Drop	The Fox Chase
1) Two Reels : The Pure Drop; The Flax in Bloom 2) Slow Air : The Fairy Boy; 3) Hornpipes : The Groves Hornpipe; Dwyer's Hornpipe; 4) March : O'Sullivan the Great; 5) Double Jigs : When Sick, Is it Tea You Want?, The Humours of Drinagh; 6) Slow Air and Slip-Jig : By the River of Gems; The Rocky Road to Dublin; 7) Two Single Jigs : Ask My Father; Pat Ward's Jig; 8) Slow Air : Valencia Harbour; 9) Hornpipes : The Standing Abbey; The Stack of Barley; 10) Two Reels : The Leitrim Thrush; Miss Johnson; 11) March : The Return From Fingal; 12) Two Single Jigs : Chase Me, Charlie; The Dingle Regatta; 13) Slow Air : White Connor's Daughter, Nora; 14) Two Double Jigs : Slieve Russell; Sixpenny Money; 15) Three Reels : Stay for Another While; I Have No Money, The Cushogue; 16) Slow Air : The Brown Thorn	1) Two Reels : Music at the Gate; The Pigeon on the Gate 2) Two double Jigs : The Blooming Meadows; Kitty's Rambles; 3) Slow Air : Ned of the Hill; 4) Two single Jigs : Smash the Windows; The Dark Girl in Blue; 5) Two Hornpipes : The Derry Hornpipe; The Cuckoo's Nest; 6) Song-tune : The Trip We Took Over the Mountain; 7) Three Reels : The Merry Sisters; Music in the Forge; Castle Kelly; 8) Hornpipe : Johnny Cope; 9) Two Reels : The Rainy day; A Fair Wind; 10) Descriptive Piping Piece : The Fox Chase; 11) Two Reels : The Braes of Busby; Colonel Fraze; 12) Slip-jig : The Kid On The Mountain

== Musicians ==
- Séamus Ennis - uilleann pipes
