= Valparaiso (album) =

Studio album by Rita Connolly
- Released: February 20, 1996
- Recorded: Westland Studios & Windmill Lane Studios, Dublin, Ireland
- Genre: Celtic Music
- Label: Tara Music label
- Producer: Shaun Davey, Rita Connolly

Rita Connolly chronology
Rita Connolly (1992)	Valparaiso (1996)

Valparaiso is Rita Connolly's second solo recording, released in 1996. It features a guest appearance by Iarla O'Lionaird on vocals.

== Track listing ==
1. "Ocean Floor"–4:55 (S. Condell)
2. "Valparaiso"–3:57 (R. Connolly)
3. "Lizzie Finn"–5:10 (S. Barry, S. Davey)
4. "Ripples in the Rockpools"–3:27 (S. Davey)
5. "Piccadilly"–4:46 (Leo O'Kelly)
6. "His Name Is Elvis"–3:18 (S. Barry, S. Davey)
7. "Two White Horses"–2:39 (S. Condell)
8. "Shakin' the Blues Away"–2:33 (Irving Berlin)
9. "Sun Song"–3:51 (R. Connolly, S. Davey)
10. "Rio"–4:48 (Michael Nesmith)
11. "The Great Guns Roarv"–4:00 (S. Davey)
12. "The Quiet Land of Erin"–3:36 (J O'Hara, S. Davey)

== Personnel ==
- Rita Connolly - Vocals.
- Iarla O'Lionaird - Vocals.
- Shaun Davey - Harmony vocals.
- Robbie Brennan & Paul McAteer - Drums.
- Noel Eccles - Percussion.
- Eoghan O'Neill - Bass guitars.
- Des Moore - Acoustic & electric guitar, High String Guitar & Mandolin.
- Anthony Drennan - Lead electric guitar, Dobro, Acoustic guitar, E-Bow electric.
- Jimmy Smith - Lead electric guitar.
- Gerry O'Beirne - Acoustic guitar.
- Paul Drennan & Eddie Lynch - Keyboards.
- Michael Buckley - Soprano & Tenor Sax, Flute.
- Matthew Manning - Oboe, Cor Anglais.
- Backing Vocals/Chorus: Sean Connolly, Patricia Connolly, Enda Connolly, Inez Connolly, Ursula Connolly, Clare Kenny, Carla Gallagher, Valerie Armstrong and Steve Cooney.

=== Production ===
- Produced by Shaun Davey.
- Co-Produced by Rita Connolly.
- Engineered & mixed by Bill Somerville-Large
- Additional engineering - Andrew Boland & Brian Masterson.
- Assistant Engineer - Conan Doyle.
- Executive Producer - John Cook.
- Computer Programming - Dennis Woods.
- Recorded at Westland Studios & Windmill Lane Studios, Dublin.
