= Martin Ferrero =

American actor

- Born: Martin Victor Ferrero; September 29, 1947 (age 77); Brockport, New York, U.S.
- Occupation: Actor
- Years active: 1979–present

Martin Victor Ferrero (born September 29, 1947) is an American actor. His best-known roles are Izzy Moreno in Miami Vice (1984–1989) and Donald Gennaro in the 1993 film Jurassic Park.

== Career ==
Ferrero was born in Brockport, New York. He joined the California Actors Theater in Los Gatos, California. In 1979, he moved to Los Angeles and began to act in Hollywood. He is widely remembered for his role as the ill-fated lawyer Donald Gennaro in Jurassic Park (1993). He appeared as a regular on the 1980s TV series Miami Vice playing the comic relief character Izzy Moreno, an informant with a Cuban accent infused with a malapropism who was involved in a variety of outlandish business ventures. He initially appeared in the pilot episode as assassin Trini DeSoto.

He guest-starred on an episode of Cheers ("Rescue Me", season 3), playing the role of an Italian waiter. In addition, he has appeared in Get Shorty (1995), Gods and Monsters (1998), and The Tailor of Panama (2001). As of 2008, Ferrero is a member of the Antaeus Company, a Los Angeles classical theater ensemble. In 2011, he reprised the role of Donald Gennaro in a CollegeHumor (now Dropout) parody of Jurassic Park.

== Filmography ==
=== Film ===
Year	Title	Role	Notes
1981	The Incredible Shrinking Woman	Guard	
1981	Knightriders	Bontempi	
1982	I Ought to Be in Pictures	Monte Del Rey	
1986	Gung Ho	Crandall	
1986	Band of the Hand	Hardware Clerk	Uncredited
1986	Modern Girls	Music Video Director	
1987	Planes, Trains and Automobiles	Second Motel Clerk	
1988	High Spirits	Malcolm	
1991	Oscar	Luigi Finucci	
1992	Stop! Or My Mom Will Shoot	Paulie	
1993	Reckless Kelly	Ernie the Fan	
1993	Jurassic Park	Donald Gennaro	
1995	Get Shorty	Tommy Carlo	
1995	Heat	Construction Clerk	
1998	Gods and Monsters	George Cukor	
1998	The Naked Man	Sammy	
2001	Air Bud: World Pup	Snerbert	Voice
2001	The Tailor of Panama	Teddy, the Reporter	

=== Television ===
Year	Title	Role	Notes
1979	The Ropers	Salesman	Episode: "Puppy Love"
1979	Soap	Waiter	Episode: "Episode #3.6"
1981	M*A*S*H	Wounded man in jeep	Episode: "That's Show Biz"
1982	Mork & Mindy	The Salesman	Episode "I Don't Remember Mama" (#4.15)
1983	Diff'rent Strokes	Coach	Episode "The Goat"
1984	Alice	Bart	Episode "Romancing Mr. Stone"
1985	Hill Street Blues	Alan "Rambo" Branford	Episode: "Somewhere Over The Rambo"
1985	Cheers	Waiter	Episode: "Rescue Me"
1986	Moonlighting	Peter Macy	Episode: "Yours, Very Deadly"
1984–1989	Miami Vice	Izzy Moreno/Trini DeSoto	18 episodes/1 episode
1988	L.A. Law	Julius Goldfarb / The Salamander	Episode: "Leapin' Lizards"
1990	Shannon's Deal	Lou Gondolf	
1996	Nash Bridges	Vincenzo 'Vince' Diamond	Episode: "Javelin Catcher"
1997	The Practice	Sam Feldberg	Episode: "Save the Mule"
1998	The X-Files	Shooter	Episode: "The End"
2000	Ali: An American Hero	Angelo Dundee	(TV movie)
2011	CollegeHumor Originals	Donald Gennaro	Episode: "Jurassic Park Character's Awful Realization"
2017	Jimmy Kimmel Live!	Himself; Donald Gennaro	Episode: David Muir, Pedro Pascal, Music from Mariah Carey
