= Take a Chance (Stockton's Wing album) =

Studio album by Stockton's Wing
- Released: 1980
- Recorded: Westland Studios, Dublin
- Genre: Irish Folk
- Label: Tara Music label
- Producer: P.J. Curtis

Stockton's Wing chronology
Stockton's Wing (1978)	Take a Chance (1980)	Light in the Western Sky (1982)

Professional ratings
Review scores
Source	Rating
Allmusic	3/5 stars

Take a Chance is the second album by Irish band Stockton's Wing. It features songwriter Mike Hanrahan on vocals. Mike's own compositions featured on the album were the start of the group's move away from the pure traditional music to a more contemporary style which later became their trademark. Maura O'Connell is also featured on backing vocals.

== Track listing ==
1. My Darling Asleep, Sonny Brogans - Jigs
2. Boys of the Lough, Star of Munster - Reels
3. Cameron Highlander's
4. Take a Chance - Song
5. Bill Harte's, Going to the Well for Water - Jig & Slide
6. Fiddler John - Song
7. The Frost Is All Over, Queen of the Rushes - Jigs
8. The Post Man - Bodhrán solo
9. Ten Thousand Miles - Song
10. Austin Tierneys, Hughie Travers, Jenny's Chickens - Reels & Jigs

== Musicians ==
- Mike Hanrahan : Guitar and Vocals
- Tommy Hayes : Bodhran, Jew's Harp, Bones, Spoons
- Paul Roche : Flute, Whistle, Low Whistle, Vocals
- Maurice Lennon : Fiddle, Viola, Vocals
- Kieran Hanrahan : Banjo, Mandolin, Bouzouki, Guitar, Harmonica
- Additional Musicians include:
  - Tony Callanan on guitar, Maura O'Connell on backing vocals and Philip Begley on Piano.
