= Rita Connolly =

- Origin: Dublin
- Genres: Celtic; Folk
- Occupation: Singer guitarist
- Years active: c.1977–present

Rita Connolly is a singer who has lived and worked in Ireland. She is primarily known for her work with composer Shaun Davey who wrote a song cycle for her called Granuaile based on the 16th-century pirate queen Gráinne O'Malley as well as including her in other of his works such as The Relief of Derry Symphony, The Pilgrim Suite and his Special Olympics music which was specially composed in 2003. Rita Connolly and Ronan Tynan sang the anthem song "May We Never Have to Say Goodbye" which topped the Irish charts for two weeks. She has also produced two solo albums, one with the eponymous title Rita Connolly, and the second Valpariso on the Tara Music label.

In more recent times she has collaborated again with Davey (who is also her husband) and County Kerry based musicians Seamus Begley, Éilís Ní Chinneide, Laurence Courtney, Daithí Ó Sé, and Eoin Begley. They produced a unique body of work based on local poet Caoimhin O Cinneide's poetry converted into a group of songs. They now perform as a band called Beal Tuinne. Rita has also been performing with other musicians such as Liam O'Flynn, Arty McGlynn, Neil Martin, Sean Keane, Noel Eccles and Shaun Davey in a new venture called The Funeral Band. She also performs in a quartet with her husband Shaun Davey, guitarist Gerry O'Beirne, and concertina player Eoin Begley.

Rita has sung for and with many of the great names in Irish music including Shaun Davey, Bill Whelan, Donal Lunny, Andy Irvine, Christy Moore, Luka Bloom and Jimmy McCarthy. She has also sung songs for theatre, television and film including "The Deer's Cry" for Who Bombed Birmingham and "Todavia Cantamos" for The Tailor of Panama. She has sung in many great venues including the National Concert Hall, Dublin, The Albert Hall, London and Chicago Symphony Centre, Chicago.

== Discography ==
- Ten Years On [with The Connolly Sisters] – Universal Folk Club (1977)
- Give a Little Love – Stagalee (1978)
- Pride of the Heard – Shaun Davey (1978)
- Scullion – Scullion (1979)
- Sean O'Casey Songbook – Paul Brady (1980)
- "Arc of a Diver" – Philip King (1982)
- The Pilgrim – Shaun Davey (1983)
- Ride On – Mary Coughlan (1984)
- Granuaile – Shaun Davey (1986)
- The Relief of Derry Symphony – Shaun Davey (1990)
- Out to an Other Side – Liam O'Flynn (1992)
- Rita Connolly – Rita Connolly (1992)
- Valparaiso – Rita Connolly (1995)
- Sur les Quais de Dublin – Gilles Servat (1996)
- Waking Ned Devine – Shaun Davey (1998)
- May We Never Have To Say Goodbye – Shaun Davey (2006)
- Beal Tuinne – Live at St. James Church Dingle – Beal Tuinne (2007)
- Voices From The Merry Cemetery – Shaun Davey (2010)

=== Films ===
- 1977 – Catchpenny Twist Shaun Davey
- 1978 – Tears Donal Lunny & Jimmy McCarthy
- 1984 – Eat the Peach Donal Lunny & Paul Brady
- 1987 – Who Bombed Birmingham Shaun Davey
- 1995 – The Hanging Gael Shaun Davey
- 1998 – Waking Ned Devine Shaun Davey
- 2001 – The Tailor of Panama
