= Carlos Núñez Muñoz =

Spanish musician

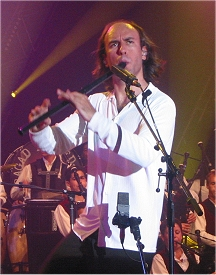
Carlos Núñez performing in Lorient, Brittany

Carlos Núñez Muñoz (born 1971) is a Spanish musician and multi-instrumentalist who plays the gaita, the traditional Galician bagpipe, Galician flute, ocarina, Irish flute, whistle and low whistle.

== Life and career ==
Nuñez was born in 1971 in Vigo, Galicia. He began playing the bagpipes when he was eight years old. In his early teens, he was invited to play with the Festival Orchestra of the Festival Interceltique de Lorient in Brittany. He studied the recorder at the Royal Conservatory in Madrid, Spain and quickly gained stature as a young virtuoso. He met Paddy Moloney of The Chieftains and performed with the band two years later, becoming referred to as the "7th member" of the band. He appeared on their Grammy-winning Santiago, which focused on Galician music and included other artists such as Los Lobos and Linda Ronstadt.

He has collaborated with Ry Cooder, Sharon Shannon, Sinéad O'Connor, The Chieftains, Altan and La Vieja Trova Santiaguera. He collaborated with Liam O'Flynn on The Piper's Call to perform Muiñeira de Poio / Muiñeira de Ourense. His most renowned album was 1996's A Irmandade Das Estrelas, which sold an unprecedented 100,000 copies, and included collaborations with Nightnoise, Luz Casal, Tino di Geraldo, Tríona Ní Dhomhnaill and Mícheál Ó Domhnaill, Kepa Junkera, Ry Cooder, The Chieftains, and Dulce Pontes. He also collaborated with Phamie Gow from Scotland.

He was a key collaborator in Tamiya Terashima's soundtrack for the film Tales from Earthsea (Gedo Senki), released in July 2006. He also released an additional album, titled Melodies from Gedo Senki, which included new Gedo Senki open source tracks (OST) along with new tunes by Carlos himself.

On his 1999 album Os Amores Libres, he collaborated with French producer Hector Zazou.

He continues to tour the world playing in large and small venues. Nuñez was in Japan in October 2011 reciting at two locations, at Sarutahiko Shrine in Ise, Mie and a live house in Tokyo with regular collaborator Pancho Álvarez (bouzouki), his brother Xurxo Nuñez (percussion) and Begona Rioboo (fiddle) working with an Okinawan singer songwriter Koja Misako and keyboardist Sahara Kazuya. He played his first major North American tour in October 2012, accompanied by his brother Xurxo on percussion, Álvarez on guitar, fiddle player Katie McNally (in the United States), and fiddle-player Sahra Featherstone and singer Eleanor McCain (in Canada). He was hailed as the "Hendrix of the bagpipes".

In 2010 he collaborated with the French Puy du Fou theme park in the creation of their show "The Secret of the Lance." In January 2013 he embarked on a seven date tour of the UK with fellow pipe-player Philip Pickett and early music ensemble The Musicians of the Globe.

In 2016 he participated in the film J: Beyond Flamenco by Carlos Saura, the legendary Spanish film maker who reveals the energy and passion of the jota, a waltz-like castanet dance with its origins in Saura's home province of Aragon. Around a Celtic circle, Nuñez with his bagpipe directed the Galician jota. Surrounded by musicians and dancers, he got a crescendo that ends up being one of the most energetic and magical moments of the film.

== Albums ==
- A irmandade das estrelas (Brotherhood of Stars) - 1996
- Os Amores Libres - 1999
- Maio Longo - 2000
- Todos Os Mundos - 2002
- Un Galicien en Bretagne (a.k.a. Finisterre: the End of the Earth) - 2003
- Cinema Do Mar - 2005
- En Concert - 2006 CD & DVD
- Melodies from Gedo Senki (Tales From Earthsea) - 2007
- Alborada do Brasil - 2009
- Discover - 2012
- Inter-Celtic - 2014, Sony
- Vuélveme a Ti - 2022
- Celtic Sea - 2023

== See also ==
- Galician traditional music
