= The Poet & The Piper =

Studio album by Seamus Heaney & Liam O'Flynn
- Released: 2003
- Recorded: 2003
- Genre: Irish traditional Celtic; Poetry
- Length: 54:00
- Label: Claddagh Records

The Poet & The Piper is a studio album by poet Seamus Heaney and piper Liam O'Flynn, recorded in 2003 and released in the same year. The album is made up of instrumental tracks and spoken poetry, both often mixed together. The recording features traditional and contemporary music, lyrics and poetry such as An Bonnán Buí, one of the oldest known Irish traditional songs. The album was used as a soundtrack for television programme Keeping Time broadcast on both RTÉ and the BBC.

== Track listing ==
1. The Given Note / Port na bPúcaí
2. Digging
3. Bogland
4. Árdaí Chuain
5. At the Wellhead
6. The Otter
7. The Rolling Wave / The Hag's Money
8. The Yellow Bittern (An Bonnán Buí)
9. The Yellow Bittern / The Broken Pledge
10. The Glamoured (Gile na Gile)
11. Aisling Gheal
12. The Tollund Man
13. Midterm Break
14. Sliabh Gallon's Brae
15. Clearances 3
16. Clearances 5
17. Cronán na Máthar
18. Two Lorries
19. The Humours of Castlebernard / The Bank of Turf
20. A Call
21. Seeing Things - Section 3
22. Fáinne Geal an Lae
23. St. Kevin and the Blackbird
24. Open the Door for Three
25. The Annals Say
26. Postscript
27. Garret Barry's Reel / Seán Reid's Favourite

== Personnel ==
- Seamus Heaney – Spoken word
- Liam O'Flynn – uilleann pipes, tin whistle
- Stephen Cooney – guitar
- Rod McVey – harmonium
