= The Song of the Singing Horseman =

Studio album by Jimmy MacCarthy
- Released: 1991
- Recorded: 1989–1990
- Genre: Folk
- Label: Mulligan Records
- Producer: Jimmy MacCarthy, Brian Masterson

Jimmy MacCarthy chronology
The Song of the Singing Horseman (1991)	The Dreamer (1994)

The Song of the Singing Horseman is the first album of Irish singer songwriter Jimmy MacCarthy. The album was released in 1991 by Mulligan Records and it includes many of the popular songs MacCarthy wrote during the first ten years of his career including "Ride On", "Mystic Lipstick", "Bright Blue Rose" and "No Frontiers". It was not commercially available for many years but was re-released on MacCarthy's own Ride Own Records in 2016.

== Reception ==
The Song of the Singing Horseman has been described as having a "masterly blend of pop melodies, trad fiddles, Spanish guitars, country-and-western rhythms and chamber-music strings."

== Track listing ==
1. On My Enchanted Sight – 4:13
2. A Hard Man To Follow – 3:52
3. Mystic Lipstick – 4:47
4. Missing You – 3:35
5. Ride On – 4:23
6. No Frontiers – 3:56
7. The Mad Lady And Me – 3:18
8. The Grip Of Parallel – 4:06
9. The Bright Blue Rose – 4:45
10. Ancient Rain – 5:23
11. The Song of the Singing Horseman – 6:12

== Credits ==
Adapted from liner notes.

- Jimmy MacCarthy - lead and backing vocals, guitar, percussion; production and arrangement (throughout)
- James Blennerhasset - double bass
- Lloyd Byrne - percussion
- Nollaig Casey - violin, viola
- Audrey Collins, Clodagh Swiney, Tommy Cane, Aisling Drury Byrne - string quartet
- Kevin Conneff - gong, bodhrán, tambourine
- Steve Cooney - didgeridoo, nylon-string guitar
- Garvan Gallagher - double bass
- Brian Masterson - production and arrangement (with MacCarthy, tracks 6 & 10)
- Paul McAteer - drums
- Des Moore - guitar, high-string guitar
- Máirtín O'Connor - accordion
- Adele O'Dwyer - cello
- Liam Ó Maonlaí - piano
- Davy Spillane - uilleann pipes
- Bill Whelan - piano, string arrangements and conducting
- The Windmill String Ensemble, led by Audrey Collins

=== Vocalists ===
- The Voice Squad (Fran McPhail, Phil Callery, Gerry Cullen) - backing vocals
- Mandy Murphy - backing vocals
- Michael McGlynn - choral arrangement
- An Uaithne - choir
- Caitriona O'Leary - solo soprano
- Honor Hefferman, Rosa Callery, Sarah Callery - backing vocals
