= Charlie Lennon (fiddler) =

Irish traditional musician (1938–2024)

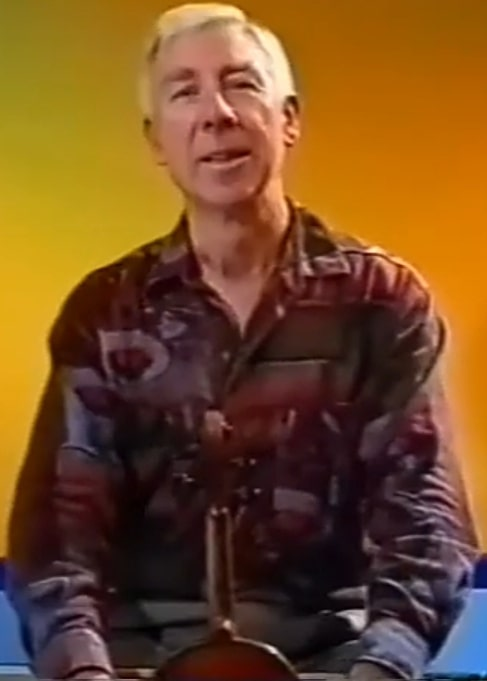
- Born: Charles Oliver Lennon; 24 July 1938; Kiltyclogher, County Leitrim, Ireland
- Died: 8 June 2024 (aged 85); Galway, Connacht, Ireland
- Education: University of Liverpool
- Years active: c. 1970s–2024
- Spouse: Síle Ní Fhlaithearta (m. 1966)
- Children: 3
- Relatives: Maurice Lennon (nephew)
- Awards: TG4 Composer of the Year (2006)
- Website: stiuideocuan.ie (his recording studio)

Charles Oliver Lennon (24 July 1938 – 8 June 2024) was an Irish musician, fiddler, composer, and pianist.

== Early life and education ==
Charles Oliver Lennon was born the youngest of four children to Jim and Sally Lennon in Kiltyclogher, County Leitrim, on 24 July 1938. Lennon learned playing instruments including the fiddle and piano at a young age, and joined several céilí bands in his teenage years. He graduated from the University of Liverpool, majoring in nuclear physics.

== Career ==
Lennon's career spanned over 50 years. His compositions include The Twelve Pins, Kilty Town, The Moving Pint, Planxty Joe Burke, Ladies’ 2nd Choice, Christmas in Spiddal, The Smiling Bride, The Road to Cashel, Lennon's No.4, The Handsome Young Maidens, The Bag of Money and Sound Man Éamonn. His recordings include Lucky in Love, The Emigrant Suite, Seeking Sanctuary Suite, Flight from the Hungry Land, Island Wedding, Time for a Tune, Aifreann Chaomháin, Áille Na hÁille, The Dance of the Honey Bees, Dusk 'Till Dawn and The Famine Suite.

Lennon's book of compositions, Musical Memories, was published in 1993. Lennon was awarded the title Ard-Ollamh by the Comhaltas Ceoltóirí Éireann in 2005. He was the 2006 TG4 Composer of the Year. Lennon's second book of compositions, Musical Memories Volume 2, was published in 2012. He was awarded the IMRO Gold Award in 2020.

Lennon also taught at third level at the University of Galway. He moved to Spiddal after his retirement, where he opened a recording studio.

== Personal life and death ==
Lennon married sean-nós singer Síle Ní Fhlaithearta in 1966, with whom he had 3 children and 8 grandchildren. He was Maurice Lennon's uncle.

Lennon died at the University Hospital Galway on 8 June 2024, aged 85.

== Select discography ==
=== Compositions ===
- The Twelve Pins
- Kilty Town
- The Moving Pint
- Planxty Joe Burke
- Ladies’ 2nd Choice
- Christmas in Spiddal
- The Smiling Bride
- The Road to Cashel
- Lennon's No.4
- The Handsome Young Maidens
- The Bag of Money
- Sound Man Éamonn

=== Recordings ===
- Lucky in Love
- The Emigrant Suite
- The Famine Suite
- Seeking Sanctuary Suite
- Flight from the Hungry Land
- Island Wedding
- Time for a Tune
- Aifreann Chaomháin
- Áille Na hÁille
- The Dance of the Honey Bees
- Dusk 'Till Dawn

== Bibliography ==
- Charlie Lennon – Musical Memories: Traditional Irish Music, Volume 1 (Published by WorldMusic, 1 January 1993; ISBN 0952120003, 978-0952120001)
- Charlie Lennon – Irish Tunes for Fiddle: Musical Memories, Volume 2 (PapCom print, Published by Waltons Irish Music, 1 December 2012; ISBN 1857202198, 978-1857202199)
