= Úna Monaghan =

Harpist, composer, sound engineer and award-winning musician

- Born: Belfast
- Education: Queen's University Belfast, PhD
- Known for: Traditional Irish music

Úna Monaghan is a harpist, composer, sound engineer and award-winning musician.

== Biography ==
Úna Monaghan was born in Belfast. She graduated with a degree in astrophysics from Cambridge and a masters in sonic arts, before she went to Queen's University Belfast where she completed a PhD on New Technologies and Experimental Practices in Contemporary Irish Traditional Music. She has been artist in residence in Paris, Montréal, and Maine. Monaghan was the studio engineer at Queen's University's Sonic Arts Research Centre. In 2016, the Ireland Canada University Foundation awarded Monaghan the James M. Flaherty Research Scholarship. Monaghan won the given the inaugural Liam O'Flynn award in 2019, worth €15,000. From 2016 to 2019 Monaghan was Rosamund Harding Research Fellow in Music at Newnham College, University of Cambridge. She went on to work with the National Concert Hall to write a six-part suite called Aonaracht. The piece was debuted in the NCH on 27 February, although only five pieces were played because one of the players, the piper, was unavailable. She works to create experimental and Irish traditional music.
