= Michelle Lally =

Irish singer (born 1970)

- Born: 16 February 1970 (age 55); County Limerick, Ireland
- Genres: Folk
- Occupation: Singer

Michelle Lally is an Irish singer born in Limerick. She is a former member of De Dannan, and has performed at the White House on multiple occasions for former Presidents Barack Obama and George W. Bush.

== Biography ==
Michelle Lally was born on 16 February 1970, and is currently a singer from Ireland. She has covered several renditions of contemporary easy listening Irish traditional songs. She has one son named Evan.

== Musical career ==
Lally was the lead vocalist of De Dannan fiddler Frankie's group, Hibernian Rhapsody (which originally went by the name De Dannan as well). They have performed with The Liverpool Philharmonic Orchestra in Liverpool.

Lally's debut album If This Be Love features songs by some of Ireland's leading songwriters such as Jimmy MacCarthy, Mick Hanly, and John Spillane. She has been described by Jimmy MacCarthy as "A voice that lingers in the mind's ear, when the enchanted listening is done," and Mick Hanly has said her voice is truly beautiful and beautifully true. Michelle's "A MOMENT IN TIME" is an album of ten original jazz tracks released in 2019. Music and lyrics by David Lyons.

== Discography ==
- If This Be Love TARA 4019
- The Full Score – Frankie Gavin & Hibernian Rhapsody TARA 4020
- In a Lonely Minute – Independently Released 2016. Written by David Lyons. Produced by Martin Quinn
- A MOMENT IN TIME" – Album independently released in 2019. Music and lyrics by David Lyons.
