= Live in Dublin (Christy Moore album) =

Live album by Christy Moore and Friends
- Released: 1978
- Recorded: April 1978, Dublin
- Genre: Irish folk
- Length: 36:27
- Label: Tara Music
- Producer: Nicky Ryan

Christy Moore and Friends chronology
The Iron Behind the Velvet (1978)	Live in Dublin (1978)	After the Break; Planxty (1979)

Live in Dublin is a live album by Irish singer-songwriter Christy Moore.

Moore said: "We recorded this album in April 1978, when we did gigs at The Meeting Place, Pat Dowling's of Prosperous, Trinity College and the Grapevine Arts centre in North Great George's Street. One number, 'Clydes Bonnie Banks', was recorded in Nicholas Ryan's front room. We got great assistance from Ireland's greatest roadcrew, John McFadden and Leon Brennan. I'll dedicate this album to Juno, who arrived as we started."

== Track listing ==
1. "Hey Sandy" (Harvey Andrews)
2. "The Boys of Barr na Sráide" (Sigerson Clifford)
3. "Little Mother" (Anders Koppel, Thomas Koppel)
4. "Clyde's Bonnie Banks" (Traditional; arranged by Christy Moore)
5. "Pretty Boy Floyd" (Woody Guthrie)
6. "Bogey's Bonnie Belle" (Traditional; arranged by Christy Moore)
7. "The Crack Was Ninety in the Isle of Man" (Barney Rush)
8. "Black Is the Colour of My True Love's Hair" (Traditional; arranged by Christy Moore)
9. "One Last Cold Kiss" (Felix Pappalardi, Gail Collins)

== Personnel ==
- Christy Moore – guitar, vocals
- Dónal Lunny – bouzouki, guitar, background vocals
- Jimmy Faulkner – lead and slide guitars

Produced and recorded by Nicky Ryan
