= Granuaile (album) =

Studio album by Composer Shaun Davey Soloist Rita Connolly
- Released: 1985
- Recorded: Windmill Lane Studios Dublin
- Genre: Celtic Music
- Label: Tara Music label
- Producer: Shaun Davey

Professional ratings
Review scores
Source	Rating
Allmusic	4.5/5 stars

Granuaile is a blend of Classical and Irish Folk Music written by Shaun Davey for singer Rita Connolly. It is based on the life and times of the 16th century Irish pirate queen Gráinne O'Mally, who was also known as Granuaile. The album was recorded using a 35 piece chamber orchestra joined by uilleann pipe soloist Liam O'Flynn, acoustic guitar, Irish harp and percussion, and special guest Donal Lunny on bouzouki.

== Tracks ==
1. Dubhdarra
2. Ripples in the Rockpools
3. The Defence of Hen's Castle
4. Free and Easy
5. The Rescue of Hugh De lacy
6. Hen's March
7. Death of Richard-an-Iarainn (Intro)
8. Death of Richard an-Iarainn
9. Sir Richard Bingham
10. The Spanish Armada
11. The New Age

== Musicians ==
Conductor : Gareth Hudson
Vocals : Rita Connolly
Uilleann Pipes : Liam O'Flynn
Des Moore : guitar
Helen Davies : concert and Irish harps
Noel Eccles : percussion
Carl Geraghty : saxes
Marian Doherty : harpsichord
Donal Lunny : bouzouki
