= The Tailor of Panama (film) =

2001 Irish–American spy thriller directed by John Boorman

- Theatrical release poster
- Directed by: John Boorman
- Screenplay by: John le Carré; Andrew Davies; John Boorman
- Based on: The Tailor of Panama by John le Carré
- Produced by: John Boorman; Kevan Barker
- Starring: Pierce Brosnan; Geoffrey Rush; Jamie Lee Curtis; Brendan Gleeson; Catherine McCormack; Leonor Varela; Harold Pinter
- Cinematography: Philippe Rousselot
- Edited by: Ron Davis
- Music by: Shaun Davey
- Production companies: Columbia Pictures; Merlin Films
- Distributed by: Sony Pictures Releasing
- Release dates: 11 February 2001 (Berlin); 30 March 2001 (United States); 20 April 2001 (Ireland)
- Running time: 110 minutes
- Countries: Ireland; United States
- Languages: English; Spanish
- Budget: $21 million
- Box office: $28 million

The Tailor of Panama is a 2001 spy thriller film directed by John Boorman from a screenplay he co-wrote with John le Carré and Andrew Davies. Based on le Carré's 1996 novel of the same name, it stars Pierce Brosnan and Geoffrey Rush. Rush portrays the title character, a former convict turned tailor who is strong-armed by an amoral MI6 agent (Brosnan) into spying on the Panamanian government. Jamie Lee Curtis, Brendan Gleeson, Catherine McCormack, Leonor Varela and Harold Pinter co-star, along with Daniel Radcliffe in his film debut.

The film premiered at the Berlin International Film Festival on 11 February 2001, and was released theatrically in the United States by Columbia Pictures on 30 March. It received positive reviews, with praise for the performances of Brosnan and Rush, and grossed $28 million on a $21 million budget.

== Plot ==
Andy Osnard is an MI6 agent reassigned to Panama after having an affair in Madrid with the foreign minister's mistress. His superior warns him of the corruption present in Panama, but Osnard views that as an opportunity. Consulting a list of British expatriates residing in Panama, he meets Harry Pendel, the tailor to many of the country's elite.

Pendel, a gifted storyteller, passes himself off as being formerly of Savile Row, but is in fact an ex-con who used to run scams with his late uncle Benny. Pendel's American wife Louisa, the assistant to the administrator of the Panama Canal Authority, is unaware of his criminal record. While Harry is a superb tailor, he is a bad businessman; his tailor shop is constantly in debt, and he owes $50,000 of Louisa's money to the bank for a failed farming business.

Knowing that Pendel needs money, Osnard offers to help him if he feeds him information about the elite of Panama City. Pendel agrees and uses the money to pay off his debts and help his friend Mickie, a down-on-his-luck alcoholic, and his assistant Marta, who was raped and disfigured by Manuel Noriega's soldiers. However, Osnard soon requires better information, threatening to cut off the money and reveal that Pendel has been spying for a foreign government if he does not get what he wants.

Pendel starts "tailoring" his stories, escalating the roles of friends to make them appear more significant than they are. He casts Mickie as a revolutionary who still holds sway over the youth of Panama, and his shop manager as the leader of an opposition movement. After fixing the suit of the president of Panama (whose conversation consisted of his suit being too tight), he comes up with a tale that the president intends to sell the Panama Canal to China.

When an incredulous Osnard asks which, Beijing or Taiwan, Pendel replies "both." Osnard knows that Pendel is making up these stories but does not care as long as his superiors believe them. As Osnard passes along this misinformation (bypassing the embassy staff, apart from Francesca, a staffer he is sleeping with), it makes its way to Washington, where military and government officials are alarmed and plan an invasion to prevent the canal from falling into Chinese hands.

Pendel, meanwhile, seeks to end his spying, saying the opposition will not listen to him because it needs $10 million. He thinks the figure will put Osnard off, but Osnard relays a request to fund the opposition as a means to control Panama after this supposed revolution; he asks for $15 million, which is granted by the Pentagon. Osnard's superior arrives with a briefcase containing the money, ready to meet with the opposition, while American attack helicopters are preparing for an assault on the capital.

The British ambassador uncovers what Osnard has been up to and threatens to reveal everything. Osnard pays for his silence and cooperation with $1.25 million. He manages to ditch his superior and make off with the briefcase.

Meanwhile, Pendel gets a call from Marta, who tells him that Mickie has committed suicide out of fear that he would go to prison for his supposed revolutionary ties. Pendel blames himself for Mickie's death and resolves to thwart Osnard's plans. He waylays Osnard as he flees to the airport, but he gives him the slip.

Louisa, who has to fight off Osnard after she goes to investigate him and he attempts to rape her, finds out what Pendel has been doing and races to the Administrator's office. The Administrator contacts the president, who is able to contact the U.S. government and have the invasion called off shortly after it began.

During the confusion, Osnard goes to the airport, where he meets the ambassador and hands him his bribe. The ambassador allows him to get on an airplane. Pendel returns home to Louisa and tells her about his criminal past, and she forgives him. Osnard, meanwhile, escapes the country with the money.

== Cast ==
- Pierce Brosnan as Andrew "Andy" Osnard
- Geoffrey Rush as Harold "Harry" Pendel
- Jamie Lee Curtis as Louisa Pendel
- Leonor Varela as Marta
- Brendan Gleeson as Michelangelo "Mickie" Abraxas
- Harold Pinter as Uncle Benny
- Catherine McCormack as Francesca Deane
- Martin Ferrero as Teddy, The Reporter
- Daniel Radcliffe as Mark Pendel
- Lola Boorman as Sarah Pendel
- David Hayman as Luxmore
- Mark Margolis as Rafi Domingo
- John Fortune as Maltby
- Jon Polito as Ramon Rudd
- Dylan Baker as General Dusenbake
- Jonathan Hyde as Cavendish
- Lisa Dwan as Stewardess

== Production ==
The Tailor of Panama was shot at the Ardmore Studios in County Wicklow, Ireland, and on location in Panama City, Lake Gatun and Gamboa, Panama. It was produced by Boorman's Irish production company Merlin Films, with financial support from Columbia Pictures.

Like the novel, the film is inspired by Graham Greene's 1958 novel Our Man in Havana, which depicts intelligence agencies believing reports from local informants in Cuba. Whereas the novel was set in the 1990s, before the American withdrawal from the Panama Canal Zone, the film moves the time period to the 21st century.

In the original ending of the film, Osnard is shot by Pendel. This was changed to allow Osnard to escape, with this new ending reshot.

== Reception ==
The film holds a 75% approval rating on Rotten Tomatoes with an average rating of 6.8/10 based on 119 reviews. The site's consensus states: "The Tailor of Panama is a smart, darkly satirical thriller with exuberant performances from Pierce Brosnan and Geoffrey Rush." On Metacritic, it holds a score of 66 out of 100 based on reviews from 31 critics, indicating "generally favorable reviews".
