= Hey-Ho Believe =

Studio album by Jimmy MacCarthy
- Released: 12 November 2010
- Recorded: 2009–2010
- Genre: Folk
- Label: Ride On Records
- Producer: Dónal Lunny

Jimmy MacCarthy chronology
The Moment (2002)	Hey-Ho Believe (2010)

Hey-Ho Believe is the fourth album by Irish singer/songwriter Jimmy MacCarthy. It was released on November 12, 2010, through his own label Ride On Records, the same label used for the previous album The Moment. The track listing was announced via MacCarthy's official website.

== Chart reception ==
The album reached #12 in the Irish Indie Individual Albums Chart. This was ahead of pop artists like The Coronas and The Prodigy, who were placed at #19 and #20. It was behind other artists' sales however, such as Girls Aloud's Nadine Coyle who reached #6 with Insatiable and Tommy Fleming who had a #1 in the Indie charts with his album Going Back. In the second week, ending 25 November 2010, the album climbed to #9 in the Irish Indie charts.

== Track listing ==
1. "By The Drum" - 5:13
2. "Lonelier Than Any Man" - 4:25
3. "Tears to Picardy" - 4:48
4. "Throwing Doves" - 4:19
5. "The Heart of the Man" - 3:46
6. "The Pyramids at Sneem" - 4:19
7. "Switzerland and Snow" - 4:39
8. "What We Came Here For" - 3:45
9. "Begin Again" - 4:55
10. "Hey-Ho Believe" - 4:00
11. "Christian Telephone" - 3:28
