= The Piper's Call =

Studio album by Liam O'Flynn
- Released: 1999
- Recorded: Windmill Lane Studios, Dublin
- Genre: Celtic, Traditional Irish, Christmas
- Length: 47:46
- Label: Tara Music
- Producer: Arty McGlynn, Liam O'Flynn

Liam O'Flynn chronology
The Given Note (1995)	The Piper's Call (1999)

The Piper's Call is the fifth solo album by master uilleann piper and prominent Irish traditional musician Liam O'Flynn. Produced by Arty McGlynn and Liam O'Flynn and recorded at Windmill Lane Studios in Dublin, the album was released on CD as well as video in 1999. There was also a television programme which was shown on PBS in the US and TG4 in Ireland.

== Critical response ==
Professional ratings
Review scores
Source	Rating
Allmusic	3/5 stars

The mature O'Flynn piping style is a refined and stately thing, and this meditative fifth solo album The Piper's Call sees him out with Mark Knopfler and Galician piper, Carlos Núñez; great session men, Matt Molloy, Sean Keane, the pacepushing Steve Cooney and Arty McGlynn; with Micheál Ó Súilleabháin and the Irish Chamber Orchestra thrown in on one track. As such, with little need of the chord-barps of the regulators, O'Flynn concentrates on his beautifully controlled chanter work. The best tunes kick up their heels a bit, like McKenna's Reels and The Humours of Carrigaholt, showing O'Flynn's authority on the pipes at its most gorgeously alert; wrestling with Núñez in the jig-like muineiras; or the madness of Keane's fiddle cutting across The Gold Ring. It has its own moods and humours, but like the pipes themselves, this album very much grows on you.

== Track listing ==
1. "The Humours of Kiltyclogher, Julia Clifford's" – 4:10
2. "The Pleasures of Hope, Rick's Rambles" – 3:54
3. "An Droichead (The Bridge)" – 3:38
4. "Miss Admiral Gordon's Strathspey" – 2:47
5. "Sliabh na mBan (The Women's Mountain)" – 4:52
6. "The Drunken Landlady, McKenna's Reels" – 3:30
7. "Muiñeira de Poio / Muiñeira de Ourense" – 3:28
8. "Bean Dubh an Ghleanna (The Dark Woman of the Glen)" – 6:12
9. "The Humours of Carrigaholt Set" – 5:29
10. "The Gold Ring" – 3:52
11. "Marcha de Breixo / Marcha de Lousame" – 5:54

== Personnel ==
- Liam O'Flynn – uilleann pipes, whistle
- Arty McGlynn – guitar
- Steve Cooney – guitar
- Rod McVey – keyboards, harmonium
- Liam Bradley – percussion
- Mark Knopfler – electric guitar
- Seán Keane – fiddle
- Matt Molloy – flute
- Carlos Núñez – gaita, ocarina, whistles
- Irish Chamber Orchestra – orchestra
- Fionnuala Hunt – artistic director
- Ian Dakin – horns
- Fergus O'Carroll – horns
- Micheál O'Súilleabháin – orchestral arrangement
