= Séamus Ennis =

Irish traditional musician (1919–1982)

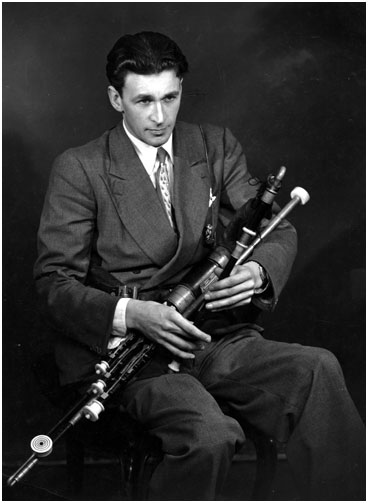
- Ennis in 1955

Background information
- Born: Séamus Ennis; 5 May 1919; Finglas, Dublin, Ireland
- Died: 5 October 1982 (aged 63) Naul, County Dublin, Ireland
- Genre: Irish Traditional Music
- Occupations: Musician, Singer, Irish music collector
- Instruments: Uilleann pipes, tin whistle, fiddle, vocals
- Years active: 1958–1982
- Labels: Tradition, Green Linnet, Claddagh
- Formerly of: The Halfpenny Bridge Quartet
- Past members: Liam O'Flynn; Sonny Brogan; Seán Keane

Séamus Ennis (Irish: Séamas Mac Aonghusa; 5 May 1919 – 5 October 1982) was an Irish traditional musician, singer and Irish music collector. He was most noted for his uilleann pipe playing and was partly responsible for the revival of the instrument during the twentieth century, having co-founded Na Píobairí Uilleann, a nonprofit organisation dedicated to the promotion of the uilleann pipes and its music. He is recognised for having preserved almost 2,000 Irish songs and dance-tunes as part of the work he did with the Irish Folklore Commission. Ennis is widely regarded as one of the greatest uilleann pipers of all time.

== Early years ==
James Ennis, Séamus's father, worked for the Irish Civil Service at Naul, County Dublin. In 1908, James Ennis had been in a pawn-shop in London. He bought a bag containing the pieces of a set of old uilleann pipes. They were made in the mid nineteenth century by Coyne Pipemakers of Thomas Street in Dublin. In 1912, he came first in the Oireachtas competition for warpipes and second in the uilleann pipes. He was also a prize-winning dancer. In 1916, he married Mary Josephine McCabe, an accomplished fiddle player from County Monaghan. They had six children, Angela, Séamus, Barbara, and twins, Cormac and Ursula (Pixie) and Desmond. Séamus was born on 5 May 1919 in Jamestown in Finglas, North Dublin City. James Ennis was a member of the Fingal trio, which included Frank O'Higgins on fiddle and John Cawley on flute and performed regularly with them on the radio. At the age of thirteen, Séamus started receiving lessons on the pipes from his father. He attended a Gaelscoil, Cholmcille, and a Gaelcholáiste, Coláiste Mhuire, which gave him a knowledge of the Irish language that would serve him well in later life. He sat an exam to become Employment Exchange clerk but was too far down the list to be offered a job. He was twenty and unemployed.

== Three Candles Press ==
Colm Ó Lochlainn was editor of Irish Street Ballads and a friend of the Ennis family. In 1938 Séamus confided in Colm that he intended to move to England to join the British Army. Colm immediately offered him a job at The Three Candles Press. There Séamus learned all aspects of the printing trade. This included writing down slow airs for printed scores – a skill which later proved important. Colm was director of an Irish language choir, An Claisceadal, which Séamus joined. In 1942, during The Emergency, shortages and rationing meant that things became difficult in the printing trade. Professor Seamus Ó Duilearge of the Irish Folklore Commission hired the 23-year-old to collect songs. He was given "pen, paper and pushbike" and a salary of three pounds per week. Off he went to Connemara.

== Song collector ==
From 1942 to 1947, working for the Irish Folklore Commission, Séamus collected songs in west Munster; counties Galway, Cavan, Mayo; Donegal, Kerry; the Aran Islands and the Scottish Hebrides. His knowledge of Scots Gaelic enabled him to transcribe much of the John Lorne Campbell collection of songs. Elizabeth Cronin of Baile Mhuirne, County Cork was so keen to chat to Séamus on his visits that she wrote down her own songs and handed them over as he arrived, and then got down to conversation. He had a natural empathy with the musicians and singers he met. In August 1947 he started work as an outside broadcast officer with Raidió Éireann. He was a presenter and recorded Willie Clancy, Sean Reid and Micho Russell for the first time. There was an air of authority in his voice. In 1951, Alan Lomax and Jean Ritchie arrived from America to record Irish songs and tunes. The tables were turned as Séamus became the subject of someone else's collection. There is a photograph from 1952/53 showing Jean huddled over the tape recorder while Séamus plays Uilleann pipes.

== As I Roved Out ==
Late in 1951, he joined the BBC. He moved to London to work with producer Brian George. In 1952 he married Margaret Glynn. They had two children, the organist Catherine Ennis and Christopher. His job was to record the traditional music of England, Scotland, Wales and Ireland and to present it on the BBC Home Service. The programme was called As I Roved Out and ran until 1958. Meeting up with Alan Lomax again, Séamus was largely responsible for the album Folk and Primitive Music (volume on Ireland) on the Columbia label. It has since been reissued on the [Rounder] Label

== Full-time musician ==
In 1958, after his contract with the BBC was not renewed, he started doing freelance work, first in England then back in Ireland, with the new TV station Teilifis Éireann. Soon he was relying totally on his musical ability to make a living. About this time his marriage broke down and he returned to Ireland. He suffered from tuberculosis and was ill for some time. In 1964, he performed at the Newport Folk Festival. His father gave him the pipes he had bought in 1908. Although most pipers can be classed as playing in a tight style or an open style, Séamus was in between. Séamus was a master of the slow air, knowing how to decorate long notes with taste and discreet variation.

Two events will live in legend among pipers. The first was in Bettystown in 1968, when the society of Irish pipers, Na Píobairí Uilleann, was formed. Breandán Breathnach was playing a tape of his own piping. Séamus asked "What year?" Brendan replied "1948". Séamus said "So I thought". For a couple of hours the younger players performed while Séamus sat in silence. Eventually he was asked to play. Slowly he took off his coat and rolled up his sleeves. He spent 20 minutes tuning up his 130-year-old pipes. He then asked the gathering whether all the tape recorders were ready and proceeded to play for over an hour. To everyone's astonishment he then offered his precious pipes to Willie Clancy to play a set. Willie demurred but eventually gave in. Next Liam O'Flynn (Liam Óg Ó Floinn) was asked to play them, and so on, round the room. The second unforgettable session was in Dowlings' pub in Prosperous in County Kildare. Christy Moore was there, as well as most of the future members of Planxty.

"Séamus Ennis is my mentor. He made me realise music is magic and a spiritual experience. It cannot be taught in any university. It is beyond that."

— Tony MacMahon on Séamus Ennis.

Séamus never ran any school of piping but his enthusiasm infused everyone he met. In the early seventies, he shared a house with Liam O'Flynn for almost three years. Finally he bought a piece of land in Naul and lived in a mobile home there. One of his last performances was at the Willie Clancy Summer School in 1982. He died on 5 October 1982. His pipes were bequeathed to Liam O'Flynn. Radio producer Peter Browne produced a compilation of his performances, called The Return from Fingal, spanning 40 years.

== Commemoration ==
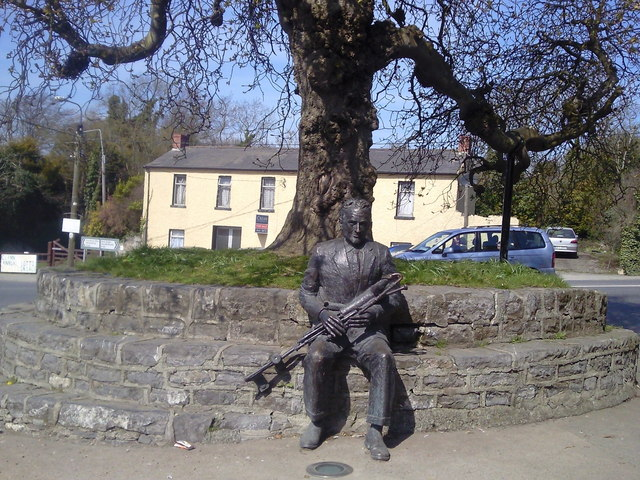
Seamus Ennis statue in Naul, County Dublin

Séamus Ennis Road in his native Finglas is named in his honour. The Séamus Ennis Arts Centre in Naul was opened in his honour, to commemorate his work and to promote the traditional arts. He is also the subject of Christy Moore's song 'The Easter Snow.' This is the title of a slow air Ennis used to play, and one after which he named his final home in Naul.

== Discography ==
=== Albums ===
- The Bonny Bunch of Roses (1957)
- The Ace and Deuce of Piping (1961)
- Ceol, Scéalta agus Amhráin (1961)
- Forty Years of Irish Piping (1974)
- The Pure Drop (1974)
- The Fox Chase (1974)
- The Best of Irish Piping (1974)
- Irish Pipe and Tin Whistle Songs (1976)
- Feidhlim Tonn Rí's Castle (1977)
- The Wandering Minstrel (1977)
- Forty Years of Irish Piping (1977)
- The Return from Fingal (1997)
- Two Centuries of Celtic Music (2001)
- Séamus Ennis – Ceol, Scéalta agus Amhráin (Remastered, 2006)

=== Anthologies (various artists) ===
- Irish Pipe and Tin Whistle Songs (1994)
- Green Linnet 20th Anniversary Collection (1996)
- Alan Lomax Sampler (1997)
- Traditional Dance Music of Ireland (1997)

In 2009 The Blackbird from The Wandering Minstrel was included in Topic Records 70 year anniversary boxed set Three Score and Ten as track eight on the third CD.

== See also ==
- List of Irish musicians
- List of Irish music collectors
