= Stockton's Wing =

Irish band, founded 1977

Background information
- Origin: Ennis, Ireland
- Genres: Celtic, Folk-rock
- Years active: 1978 to 1995; Intermittently later
- Labels: Tara Music label, Polygram Ireland, Revolving Records
- Members: Kieran Hanrahan; Tara Breen; Mike Hanrahan; Paul Roche; Tommy Hayes
- Past members: Maurice Lennon (co-founder member); Tony Callanan; Fran Breen; Steve Cooney; Brian Calnan; Tony Molloy; Davey McNevin; Peter Keenan; Eamon McElholm; John Kearns; Robbie Casserley; Eddie Lee; Myles Drennan; John Walsh..

Stockton's Wing are an Irish band formed in 1977 by four All-Ireland champion musicians; Paul Roche on flute/whistle, Maurice Lennon on fiddle, Tommy Hayes on bodhran, and Kieran Hanrahan on banjo/mandolin, along with Tony Callinan on guitar and vocals. They have collaborated with well known artists including Christy Moore, "as well as more than a dozen musicians who have worked to create an impressive collection of work". Their style has been described as including "Irish folk, melancholic ballads, upbeat jigs, and modern pop". Stockton's Wing have supported artists including Michael Jackson and Prince.

Their song "Over The Moor" is used as the theme music for Liveline, one of the most popular radio shows in Ireland.

== Name ==
The band took its name from a line from the Bruce Springsteen song "Backstreets": "Slow dancin' in the dark on the beach at Stockton's Wing, where desperate lovers park to meet the last of the Duke Street Kings.”

== Early years ==
The five founding members had won in the traditional music category of a talent competition, sponsored by Guinness, in Limerick. An up-an-coming rock band from Dublin, U2, formed only two years before, won the rock category. The victory landed Stockton's Wing a contract with Tara Records, who released their self-titled debut in 1978, which consisted of traditional songs.

These quickly gave way to a mix of more contemporary influences, as "they departed from their Trad roots". During the recording of their second album, Take A Chance (1980), singer-songwriter and guitarist Mike Hanrahan replaced Tony Callinan. Unlike its predecessor, the sophomore effort "featured some original music and marked the arrival of a progressive force into the world of Irish music." At the Ballisodare Folk Festival they met Australian Stephen Cooney who then joined the band playing bass guitar, and didgeridoo, further adding to the evolving sonic tapestry.

1982 saw the release of Light In The Western Sky, with the band moving further into original compositions, and delivered the hit singles "Beautiful Affair" and "Walk Away". The following year, Tommy Hayes was replaced by Fran Breen on drums, and Peter Keenan joined on keyboards.

== Extensive international tours ==
1984 saw Stockton's Wing embark on their first American tour. This coincided with the release of American Special, a compilation by Shanachie Records, containing "a selection from each of Stockton's Irish releases". The band toured extensively, staying away from the studio, and in 1985 released the live album Stockton's Wing Live - Take One, which had been recorded in Dublin and Galway. Re-mastered in 2006, it was aimed at "the tens of thousands who attended the almost 1,500 performances across Ireland, the UK and America".

== Line-up changes, return to Tara ==
1986 saw the release of Full Flight. This was followed in 1988 by Celtic Roots Revival. In 1991, Davey McNevin replaced Kieran Hanrahan, with Fran Breen and Stephen Cooney also departing. Fran Breen joined Nanci Griffith's Blue Moon Orchestra, and Stephen Cooney began a fruitful collaboration with accordion player Séamus Begley. Kieran Hanrahan went on to present the traditional music program Ceili House on RTÉ Radio 1. Stockton's Wing were the band playing at the céilí in the Jim Sheridan film The Field (1990). The following year, they returned to Tara Records for the release of a 20-track compilation of their first three albums (reissued in a 2005 boxset). 1992 saw the release of The Crooked Rose, and in 1995, with Eamon McElholm having taken over as lead singer, Letting Go. Their sound in this era has been described as pioneering "a sort of Celtic Yacht Rock – mixing Steely Dan with Planxty, The Chieftains with The Doobie Brothers."

== Twenty first century ==
In 2003, original members Paul, Maurice, Kieran and Tommy along with Mike Hanrahan got together for a number of reunion concerts. In January 2009 they took to the stage at the West County Hotel, County Clare. In 2020, Beautiful Affair: A Stockton's Wing Retrospective, was released. The band toured in 2019/2020, and drew on recordings from two concerts in Ennis and Dublin, for the album Hometown. "Showcasing material from across the band’s career", music journalist Ed Power wrote, "it is reminder of their unique blend of the ancient and modern. Folk collides with funk, confessional songwriting with rock ’n roll."

== Discography ==
- Stockton's Wing, 1978
- Take A Chance, 1980
- Light in the Western Sky, 1982 (deleted)
- American Special, 1984/85 (deleted)
- Stockton's Wing Live – Take One, 1985 (deleted)(re-released 2006)
- Full Flight, 1986 (deleted)
- Celtic Roots Revival, 1988 (deleted)
- The Collection 1991
- The Crooked Rose, 1992
- Letting Go, 1995
- Celtic Collections, 1997
- The Very Best of Irish Jigs, Reels & Songs 2005
- Live - Take One (re-release) 2006
- A Beautiful Affair: A Stockton's Wing Retrospective (2020)
- Hometown (2022)
