= Missing You (Christy Moore song) =

Missing You is a folk song written by Irish songwriter Jimmy MacCarthy in the 1980s. This song has been popularized by Christy Moore.
