= The Hitch-Hiker (short story) =

- Short story by Roald Dahl
- Country: England
- Language: English
- Genre: Short story

Publication
- Published in: Atlantic Monthly
- Media type: magazine
- Publication date: August 1977

"The Hitch-Hiker" is a short story by Roald Dahl that was originally published in July 1977 issue of the Atlantic Monthly, and later included in Dahl's short story collection The Wonderful Story of Henry Sugar and Six More. The story is about a man who picks up a hitch-hiker whilst driving to London. The pick-pocketing of a policeman's notebook during a traffic stop closely follows "Hitch-Hike", a 1960 episode of Alfred Hitchcock Presents based on a short story by Ed Lacy.

It was adapted as the 13th episode of Tales of the Unexpected.

== Plot summary ==
The narrator is driving to the coast for 3 months in his new BMW 1975 car when he picks up a hitchhiker. The narrator always picks up hitchhikers since, in early times, he also used to hitchhike and he knew how difficult it can be. The author describes the hitchhiker as a small ratty-faced man with long, slim fingers. The man mentions he's going to the horse races, but not to bet or work the ticket machines. The narrator is intrigued and says he's a writer, while the hitchhiker claims to be in a highly skilled trade.

They get to talking about the car, and the narrator proudly states it can hit 129 miles per hour. The hitchhiker doubts that, so, once they hit a straight patch of road, the narrator accelerates. They are stopped by a policeman on a motorcycle, who is a bit of a bully and threatens to have the narrator thrown in prison. He takes down his address and also that of the hitchhiker, who claims to be a hod-carrier. Then he gives them a ticket and leaves and they continue on their way. The narrator is worried about the ticket, but the hitchhiker says it will be fine. The narrator then asks why the hitchhiker lied to the policeman about his job, and wonders if he is ashamed of it. The hitchhiker takes offense at the implication that he would be ashamed of his work, and the narrator tries to guess what his true occupation is. After several failed guesses, the hitchhiker reveals that he has taken several of the narrator's belongings without the narrator noticing, then explains that he is an extremely skilled pickpocketer, although he refers to himself as a "fingersmith". He makes a living by attending races and stealing money from the winners and the rich, and proudly announces that he has never been caught.

The narrator is concerned that the policeman will be checking up on the hitchhiker, but the hitchhiker is confident that no one will be checking up on him, as policemen have notoriously bad memories. The narrator points out that the policeman has the details written down in his book, only for the hitchhiker to reveal that he's stolen both books from the policeman. They pull off the road to burn the books, and the narrator admires the hitchhiker's skills.
