= The Dreamer (Jimmy MacCarthy album) =

Studio album by Jimmy MacCarthy
- Released: 1994
- Genre: Folk
- Label: Sony

Jimmy MacCarthy chronology
The Song of the Singing Horseman (1991)	The Dreamer (1994)	The Moment (2002)

The Dreamer is the second album by Irish singer/songwriter Jimmy MacCarthy, released in 1994 by Sony Music Ireland.

== Reception ==
Hot Press described it as "an ambitious work which is certain to widen MacCarthy’s standing and appeal as a gifted performer as well as a successful [sic] songwriter."

== Track listing ==
No.	Title	Length
1.	"Adam at the Window"	5:25
2.	"Shadowy"	3:37
3.	"Lorraine"	4:03
4.	"The Highest Point"	5:13
5.	"The Perfect Present"	4:00
6.	"No Frontiers"	5:34
7.	"The Carrier of Scandal"	4:21
8.	"Harlem"	4:57
9.	"Wonder Child"	4:12
10.	"The Morning of the Dreamer"	4:25
11.	"Sacred Places"	5:35
12.	"Adam (Reprise)"	1:19
Total length:		56:01
