= Jack Talty =

Irish musician, composer and producer

- Education: London College of Music; University College Cork; University of Limerick; Irish World Academy of Music and Dance
- Occupations: Composer, musician, record producer and engineer
- Relatives: Noel Hill (uncle)
- Awards: Mary V. Hart Memorial Award; Seán Ó Riada Memorial Award; Gradam Comharcheol TG4
- Website: jacktalty.com

Jack Talty is an Irish musician, composer and producer from Lissycasey, County Clare. He performs traditional Irish music on piano and concertina, which he learnt from his uncle Noel Hill.

He is co-founder of Ensemble Eriu and principal concertina player of the Irish Memory Orchestra.

With Ensemble Eriu he won the 2015 TG4 Gradam Ceoil Award for Music Collaboration.

He founded the record label Raelach Records in 2011 to focus on traditional and folk music. He has produced/co-produced over a hundred albums for the label, including Farewell to Music the final album by Tony MacMahon and The Irish Concertina 3: Live in New York by Noel Hill.

He has appeared as a performer on several releases on Raelach Records including Na Fir Bolg with Cormac Begley. and the Ensemble Eriu releases Imbas and Ensemble Eriu.

He was traditional artist in residence at University College Cork in the 2018–19 academic year and a Duala Creator in Residence at the Irish Traditional Music Archive in 2018. In 2021, he was awarded the Liam O'Flynn Award by the Arts Council and the National Concert Hall.

He has a PhD in music from the University of Limerick and teaches regularly at traditional music festivals including Willie Clancy Summer School and South Sligo Summer School.

== Discography ==
=== Solo and collaborations ===
- Na Fir Bolg (2011) with Cormac Begley
- In Flow (2016)
- Visioning (2024) soundtrack to the film of the same name
- Coire na Cheoil (2026)

=== with Ensemble Ériu ===
- Ensemble Ériu (2013)
- Imbas (2016)
- Stargazer (2017)
