= The Brendan Voyage =

Studio album by Composer Shaun Davey Soloist Liam O'Flynn
- Released: 1980
- Recorded: Dublin
- Genre: Celtic classical
- Label: Tara Music label
- Producer: Shaun Davey

Composer Shaun Davey Soloist Liam O'Flynn chronology
The Brendan Voyage	Granuaile

The Brendan Voyage was Shaun Davey's first major orchestral suite, composed for uilleann pipes played by Liam O'Flynn. It depicts Tim Severin’s adventure in reconstructing Saint Brendan’s 6th century Atlantic crossing to America. It features guest musicians Paul MacAteer (drums), Garvan Gallagher (electric bass) and Tommy Hayes (bodhran). The album title is also the title of Severin's book (ISBN 0-375-75524-1).

== Reception ==
The Brendan Voyage Suite is regarded in Ireland as a groundbreaking, crossover work of cultural significance. Composed by Shaun Davey in 1980, it is the first daring musical meeting between an Irish solo uilleann piper and a classical symphony orchestra. This confrontation of two separate traditions develops into a triumphant collaboration telling the story of explorer Tim Severin's daring and epic voyage across the Atlantic in a leather boat, a replica medieval voyage which proved that it was possible that the 6th century Irish Saint, Brendan may have reached America before Columbus or the Norsemen. The voice of the medieval boat is represented by the uilleann pipes of Liam O'Flynn, the seaworld of the Atlantic by the symphony orchestra.

Gramophone, reviewing The Brendan Voyage in 1985, wrote that "Davey writes splendid music: simple in idiom, (expressively so), and setting the scene ideally for the particular action in hand. The terror which must at times have overtaken the participants in such a voyage is perhaps understated; the joy of it is not." and describes it as "this very well made record".

Danny Saunders, writing for The Living Tradition, comments "I suspect that the fame of this album together with the length of time since its first release will mean that everyone that wanted this work will already own it. If you are lucky enough to be coming to The Brendan Voyage for the first time, having read the label, you are in for a treat."

The Irish public broadcaster Raidió Teilifís Éireann (RTÉ) ran a special programme on July 8, 2010 "The Brendan Voyage - Celebrating 30 Years", which as they said was "To mark the 30th anniversary of the composition of the orchestral suite for pipes and orchestra, The Brendan Voyage". The programme included a discussion with Tim Severin, Shaun Davey, and piper Liam Ó Floinn on St Brendan's voyage and the resulting music, as well as a recorded performance (from 2006) of the suite itself, played by Ó Floinn and the RTÉ National Symphony Orchestra.

== Tracks ==
1. Introduction
2. The Brendan Theme
3. Jig: Water under the Keel
4. Journey to the Faroes
5. The Cliffs of Mykines
6. Mykines Sound
7. Journey to Iceland
8. The Gale
9. Labrador
10. Newfoundland
