= Kieran Hanrahan =

Irish radio host and musician (born 1957)

Kieran Hanrahan (born 1957) is an Irish radio host and musician. Born in Ennis, County Clare, he began playing traditional Irish music on the tenor banjo at the age of fourteen. Over the years, Hanrahan has helped to found a number of traditional bands, including Stockton's Wing, Inchiquin, and the Temple-house Ceili Band.

Hanrahan has hosted radio programs for the Irish national broadcaster RTÉ since 1991. Hanrahan is an assistant lecturer at the Conservatory of Music and Drama at Dublin Institute of Technology where he works in the Traditional Music program. He achieved a 1st Class Honors master's degree (MMus Hons) and was also awarded the DIT Gold medal for Academic Achievement in 2012. Currently he hosts Céilí House, a radio program on traditional Irish music aired weekly in Ireland on RTÉ Radio 1. For the last five years, Kieran Hanrahan has been the artistic director of the Temple Bar TradFest in Dublin, Ireland.

== Discography ==
- Various artists: The Field (Film soundtrack) (1990)
- The Chieftains: The Long Black Veil (1995): Hanrahan appears as a guest musician.
- Kieran Hanrahan plays the Irish Tenor Banjo (1998)
- This Is My Father (Film soundtrack) (1998): In addition to performing on the soundtrack for this film, Hanrahan also appears onscreen as a band leader.
- Various artists: Agnes Browne (Film soundtrack) (2000)
