= Josephine Marsh =

Irish traditional composer and musician

- Born: Josephine Marsh; 1967 (age 58–59); London
- Genres: Irish Traditional; Celtic; Folk
- Occupations: Musician and Composer

Josephine Marsh is an Irish traditional composer as well as playing the accordion, fiddle, concertina, whistle, mandolin, guitar and banjo.

== Biography ==
Josephine Marsh was born in London in 1967 but has lived in County Clare since she was four. Her family returned to the area in 1971. She works as a full-time musician and teacher. Marsh has recorded several albums herself and her compositions have been recorded by artists including Mick McGoldrick and John McSherry, Padraig Rynne, Liadain and The London Lassies. She began taking classes when she was 10 before playing with a local music group. From there Marsh began to compete in the Gael Linn youth festival Slogadh, the Fleadh Ceoil and the Oireachtas.

Marsh moved to Sydney, Australia in 1996 and worked as a music teacher and touring musician. She performed at the National Folk Festival in Canberra, Port Fairy Festival and Geelong Folk Festival. Later she toured the US, Europe, the UK and Ireland. Marsh has performed a wide number of Irish musicians including Tommy Keane, Lillis Ó Laoire, Liz Doherty, Kitty Hayes, and Mick Kinsella.

In 2003, Marsh composed all the music for The Music of Ghosts, part of the Musician in Residence role in Mountshannon, County Clare. The production was recorded and aired on Lyric Fm. She has appeared on a number of Irish television programmes including The Pat Kenny Show, Nationwide and Geantraí. She regularly tours Ireland.

Marsh has been a tutor at the Willie Clancy Summer School. She got Arts Council funding which allowed her to focus on her compositions. In 2020 she was awarded TG4 Composer of the year.

== Albums ==
- To meet a friend with Cyril O’Donoghue (1987)
- Josephine Marsh (1996)
- I Can Hear you Smiling (2001)
- Music in the Frame (2018)
