= John O'Dreams =

Song

John O'Dreams is a song by English musician Bill Caddick who featured it on his album, Rough Music, in 1976. Its melody bears an exceptionally strong resemblance to the second theme of the first movement of Tchaikovsky's Pathetique Symphony.

Singers Gordon Bok, Éilís Kennedy, Christy Moore, Jean Redpath, Max Boyce, Garnet Rogers and The Clancy Brothers with Robbie O'Connell, Arcady with Niamh Parsons well as the late Mick Moloney have recorded versions of the song.

== Lyrics ==
When midnight comes and people homeward tread [Alternate: When midnight comes good people homeward tread]
Seek now your blanket and your feather bed
Home comes the rover, his journey's over [Alternate: Home is the rover, his journey over]
Yield up the night time to old John O' Dreams
Yield up the night time to old John O' Dreams

Across the hill, the sun has gone astray
Tomorrow's cares are many dreams away
The stars are flying, your candle is dying [Alternate: The stars are flying, the wind is sighing]
Yield up the darkness to old John O' Dreams
Yield up the darkness to old John O' Dreams

Both man and master in the night are one
All things are equal when the day is done
The prince and the ploughman, the slave and the freeman
All find their comfort with old John O' Dreams
All find their comfort with old John O' Dreams

When sleep it comes the dreams come running clear [Alternate: Now as you sleep the dreams come winging clear]
The hawks of morning cannot reach you here [Alternate: The hawks of morning cannot harm you here]
Sleep is a river, flows on forever [Alternate: Sleep is your river, float on forever]
And for your boatman choose old John O' Dreams
And for your boatman choose old John O' Dreams

When midnight comes and people homeward tread [Alternate: When midnight comes good people homeward tread]
Seek now your blanket and your feather bed
Home comes the rover, his journey's over [Alternate: Home is the rover, his journey's over]
Yield up the night time to old John O' Dreams
Yield up the night time to old John O' Dreams
