= The Voice Squad =

Traditional Irish singing group

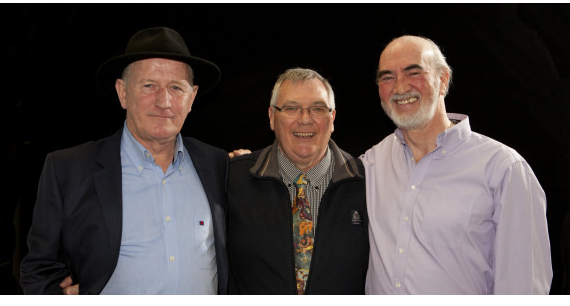
The Voice Squad

The Voice Squad was a traditional singing group from Ireland. The members were Gerry Cullen, Phil Callery, and Fran McPhail. The group recorded four albums featuring a repertoire of Irish traditional songs.They always performed unaccompanied. The members also worked as studio musicians.

The group has been compared to English family groups of a similar style, such as The Watersons and the Copper Family.

== Performances ==
The group performed in Ireland, the United Kingdom, Europe, and the United States. In October 2002, they performed at the opening of The Helix, a concert venue at Dublin City University, where Ireland's president, Mary McAleese, was present. They performed Shaun Davey's arrangement of "The Parting Glass" and the concert was recorded by RTÉ television for later broadcast.

In June 2003, the group performed at the opening ceremony of the Special Olympics World Games in Ireland, along with Rita Connolly and Ronan Tynan. They sang "May We Never Have to Say Goodbye," composed by Shaun Davey, which was the theme song for the games.

"The Voice Squad represents the melding of two related but separate traditions — a British harmony-singing tradition (as exemplified by the Copper Family and the Watersons) and the unaccompanied solo singing tradition of Northern Ireland (as exemplified by such legendary artists as Paddy Tunney and Joe Heaney). By taking the traditional Irish repertoire and harmonizing it in a generally British style, the three members of the Voice Squad have created something new and absolutely wonderful. All three singers have excellent voices, but tenor Fran McPhail is the one who brings something tonally unique to the ensemble; his voice has an eerie, almost horn-like quality that blends beautifully with the harder-edged voices of tenor Phil Callery and baritone Gerry Cullen." - Rick Anderson, Allmusic

== Recordings ==
The Voice Squad recorded four albums, including Good People All, which was a re-release of Holly Wood with the same tracks.

- Many's The Foolish Youth, 1987, Tara, TARACD4004
- Holly Wood, 1992, TARA 4013
- Good People All, 1993
- Concerning of Three Young Men, 2014, Tara, TARA4013
