= The Tailor of Panama =

1996 spy novel by John le Carré

- First edition
- Author: John le Carré
- Language: English
- Genre: Spy fiction
- Publisher: Hodder & Stoughton (UK); Alfred A. Knopf (US)
- Publication date: 1996
- Publication place: United Kingdom
- Media type: Print (hardback and paperback)
- Pages: 332
- ISBN: 0679454462
- Dewey Decimal: 823/.914 20 L456
- LC Class: PR6062.E33 L43 1996

The Tailor of Panama is a 1996 novel by British writer John le Carré. A 2001 film was released based on the novel.

== Plot ==
Harry Pendel is a British expatriate living in Panama City and running his own successful bespoke tailoring business, Pendel and Braithwaite. His wife and children are unaware that almost every detail of his life is fabricated, including his former partner, Mr Braithwaite. In reality, Harry Pendel is an ex-convict who learned tailoring in prison.

Andy Osnard is a young British MI6 officer sent to Panama to recruit agents to gather intelligence and protect British trade interests through the Panama Canal. However, Andy has his own agenda and, after he discovers Harry's past, sees the perfect opportunity to recruit a new agent and embezzle money from the British government.

Concocting a fictitious network of revolutionaries, known as the Silent Opposition, Harry, through Andy, manages to attract the interest of the British secret services and even the US government. However, Harry has used his own friends as the basis for his fantasies, and as the plots are taken more seriously they become known to the Panamanian authorities and Harry struggles to cope with the guilt of setting them up.

Harry's wife, Louisa, becomes suspicious of the amount of time he spends with Andy and suspects that Harry is having an affair. She breaks into his office and discovers all his fantastic lies.

Harry's friend, Mickie, kills himself rather than face the risk of going back to jail, and Harry helps dispose of the body, making it look like he was executed. As Mickie is the supposed leader of the Silent Opposition, the British and US governments use this as an excuse to topple the current Panamanian government.

At the end of the book the US military has begun another invasion of Panama, based largely on Harry's fabrications, and Harry watches the destruction from the window of his house.

== Inspiration ==
To research the novel le Carré visited Panama on five occasions. The book was inspired by Graham Greene's Our Man in Havana. Le Carré likens the tale to a "Casablanca without heroes," stating that he, "was drawn by the obvious corruption of Panama and the wonderful collection of characters you meet there."

In response to observations that the novel was a more light-hearted affair than his previous books, le Carré replied that, "I think I'm in the same mood as ever, but in some ways more mature. I guess you could say that, at sixty-five, when you've seen the world shape up as I have, there are only two things you can do: laugh or kill yourself. I think my character does both. In some ways it's a very personal book. I was exploring the relationship between myself and my own fabricator. Anybody in the creative business, as you might call it, has some sense of guilt about fooling around with fact, that you're committing larceny, that all of life is material for your fabulations. That was certainly Harry Pendel's position. So I found some kind of buzz running between me and the main character, which I had not really felt since A Perfect Spy."

== Reception ==
Upon publication, The Tailor of Panama received generally glowing reviews. The New York Times stated that, "What he has done is to venture fiercely into satire, producing a tour de force in which almost every convention of the classic spy novel is violated."

=== Feud with Salman Rushdie ===
A long-running literary feud between Le Carré and Salman Rushdie began in 1997 after Le Carré wrote a letter to The Guardian, complaining that politically correct forces in the US had labelled him anti-Semitic for his portrayal of one of the novel's characters. Rushdie responded that he wished Le Carré had expressed similar feelings after Rushdie was subject to a fatwa for The Satanic Verses, viewed as anti-Islamic by some Muslims.

Rushdie opined that Le Carré was an "illiterate, pompous ass", while Le Carré replied that Rushdie was a "self-canonizing, arrogant colonialist".

Guardian columnist Mark Lawson claimed the two authors appeared to be 'settling old scores', stating that: "The Collected Guardian Correspondence of Salman Rushdie and John Le Carré is in the great tradition of literary poison pen letters: both in their inventive viciousness and in the low personal revenges which may lie behind the high rhetoric".

Rushdie and Le Carré appeared to end their dispute in late 2012.
