= Liam O'Flynn =

Irish musical artist (1945–2018)

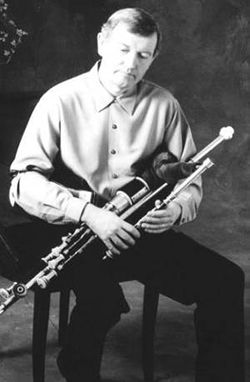
- Liam O'Flynn, ca. 1993

Background information
- Also known as: Liam Óg Ó Floinn
- Born: Liam Óg O'Flynn; 15 September 1945; Kill, County Kildare, Ireland
- Died: 14 March 2018 (aged 72) Dublin, Ireland
- Genres: Irish traditional music
- Instruments: Uilleann pipes, Tin Whistle
- Years active: 1966–2018
- Formerly of: Planxty

Liam O'Flynn, Óg Flynn (Irish: Liam Ó Floinn, 15 September 1945 – 14 March 2018) was an Irish uilleann piper and Irish traditional musician. In addition to a solo career and as a member of Planxty, O'Flynn recorded with: Christy Moore, Dónal Lunny, Andy Irvine, Kate Bush, Mark Knopfler, The Everly Brothers, Emmylou Harris, Mike Oldfield, Mary Black, Enya and Sinéad O'Connor.

O'Flynn was acknowledged as Ireland's foremost exponent of the uilleann pipes and brought the music of the instrument to a worldwide audience. In 2007, O'Flynn was named Musician of the Year at the TG4 Gradam Ceoil Awards, considered to be the foremost recognition given to traditional Irish musicians.

== Early life ==
He was born 15 September 1945 in Kill, County Kildare, Ireland, to musical parents. His father, Liam, was a teacher and fiddle player. His mother, Maisie (née Scanlan), who came from a family of musicians from Clare, played and taught piano. From an early age, O'Flynn showed musical talent, and was encouraged to pursue his interest in the uilleann pipes by the piper Tom Armstrong. At the age of 11, he began taking classes with Leo Rowsome. He was also influenced by Willie Clancy and Séamus Ennis. In the 1960s, he began to receive recognition of his talent, winning prizes at the Oireachtas Festival and the Fleadh Cheoil. During his early years, he was sometimes billed as Liam Óg Ó Flynn.

== Music career ==
In 1972, O'Flynn co-founded the Irish traditional music group Planxty, alongside Christy Moore, Andy Irvine and Dónal Lunny and remained a member throughout the band's various incarnations. While Seán Ó Riada and The Chieftains had reinvigorated Irish traditional instrumental music in an ensemble format during the 1960s, Planxty built on that foundation and took it one step further. They brought a punch and vitality to acoustic music that drew heavily on O'Flynn's piping virtuosity.

As O'Flynn grew in his skill as a musician and as he began to meet pipers like Willie Clancy and Séamus Ennis, he became acutely aware of his position in the tradition of piping. His subsequent close friendship with Ennis, which started as a master/pupil relationship, taught him that there was much more to being a piper than playing tunes. Liam noted: "Seamus Ennis gave me much more than a bag of notes."

When I'm playing, I'm certainly lost within it. The only way to describe it, is that it's like looking inwards. I think when a performer engages with the audience, and vice versa, it's like a spell is cast and a terrific passage of feelings moves from the musician to the audience and back again.

Following the break-up of Planxty in 1983, O'Flynn found work as a session musician with such prominent artists as The Everly Brothers, Enya, Kate Bush, Nigel Kennedy, Rita Connolly, and Mark Knopfler. He also worked on film scores, including Kidnapped (1979) and A River Runs Through It (1992). He was adventurous enough to work with avant-garde composer John Cage, but his most natural alliance was with neo-romantic composer Shaun Davey.

The Bothy Band were natural successors to the original Planxty, and one of its members, Matt Molloy, who subsequently joined The Chieftains, played with The Chieftains' fiddler Seán Keane on O'Flynn's album, The Piper's Call, which was performed in the 1999 Proms season at the Royal Albert Hall. He also worked on projects with Seamus Heaney, mixing poetry with music.

His name is mentioned in Christy Moore's song "Lisdoonvarna".

== Death ==
O'Flynn died in Dublin on 14 March 2018 after a long illness.

== Legacy ==
The Liam O'Flynn Award is awarded each year by the Arts Council and the National Concert Hall to recognise individual creativity in Traditional Irish music. Awardees include Úna Monaghan, Barry Kerr, Jack Talty, Louise Mulcahy and Strange Boy (aka Jordan Kelly).

== Discography ==
Solo albums

- Liam O'Flynn (1988)
- The Fine Art of Piping (1991)
- Out to an Other Side (1993)
- The Given Note (1995)
- The Piper's Call (1999)

With Christy Moore

- Prosperous (1972)
- Ordinary Man (1985)

With Planxty

- Planxty (1973)
- The Well Below the Valley (1973)
- Cold Blow and the Rainy Night (1974)
- The Planxty Collection (1974, compilation)
- After The Break (1979)
- The Woman I Loved So Well (1980)
- Words and Music (1983)
- Planxty/Live 2004 CD/DVD (2004)
- Between the Jigs and the Reels: A Retrospective CD/DVD (2016)

With Andy Irvine

- Fifth Irish Folk Festival Compilation (1978)
- Rainy Sundays... Windy Dreams (1980)
- Way Out Yonder (Andy Irvine album) (2000)
- Changing Trains (2007)
- Abocurragh (2010)
- Andy Irvine/70th Birthday Concert at Vicar St 2012 (2014)

With Shaun Davey

- The Brendan Voyage (1980)
- The Pilgrim (1983)
- Granuaile (1985)
- The Relief of Derry Symphony (1990)
- May We Never Have to Say Goodbye (2006)
- Voices from the Merry Cemetery (2010)

With Kate Bush

- The Dreaming (1982)
- Hounds of Love (1985)

With Mark Knopfler

- Cal (film soundtrack) (1984)
- Golden Heart (1995)

With Enya

- Enya (1987)
- The Celts (1987)
- Shepherd Moons (1991)

With Seamus Heaney

- The Poet & The Piper (2003)

With other artists

- The Rambles of Kitty compilation by Comhaltas Ceoltóirí Éireann (1967)
- Celtic Folkweave by Mick Hanly and Mícheál Ó Domhnaill (1974)
- Kidnapped by Vladimir Cosma (1978)
- Born Yesterday by The Everly Brothers (1985)
- The Emigrant Suite by Charlie Lennon (1985)
- Notes from my Mind by Séamus Connolly (1988)
- Best of Irish Folk Festival (1988, compilation)
- Best of Irish Folk Festival Vol 2 (1989, compilation)
- Jig it in Style by Seán Keane (1990)
- Brand New Dance by Emmylou Harris (1990)
- The Field (film soundtrack), by Elmer Bernstein (1990)
- "My Special Child" by Sinéad O'Connor (1991)
- Bringing it all Back Home (1991, compilation)
- Out of Court by Maire Casey & Chris Newman (1991)
- No Dowry by Maighread Ni Dhomhnaill (1991)
- A River Runs Through It (film soundtrack) by Mark Isham (1992)
- Rita Connolly by Rita Connolly (1992)
- The Seville Suite by Bill Whelan (1992)
- Fire Aflame by Matt Molloy, Seán Keane, and Liam O'Flynn (1992)
- Mercury Years by The Everly Brothers (1993, compilation)
- Poiema by Michael Card (1994)
- Idir Dhá Chomhairle (In Two Minds) by Aine Ui Cheallaigh (1995)
- Voyager by Mike Oldfield (1996)
- Sult Compilation (1996)
- We Wont go Home Till Morning by Brendan Begley (1997)
- Kashmir: Symphonic Led Zeppelin by the London Philharmonic Orchestra (1997)
- Finisterres by Dan Ar Braz (1997)
- With Friends Like These by James Keane (1998)
- Os Amores Libres by Carlos Núñez (1999)
- Bilbao Oo:Oh by Kepa Junkera (1999)
- Speaking With Angels by Mary Black (2000)
- Volume 3: Further in Time by Afro Celt Sound System (2001)
- Journey: The Best of Dónal Lunny by Dónal Lunny (2001)
- The Girls Won't Leave the Boys Alone by Cherish the Ladies (2001)
- To Shorten the Winter by Tommy Sands (2001)
- The Blue Idol by Altan (2002)
- An Dealg Óir by Pádraigín Ní Uallacháin (2002)

== See also ==
- List of bagpipers
