= Jimmy MacCarthy =

Irish singer-songwriter (born 1953)

- Born: 28 January 1953 (age 73); Macroom, County Cork, Ireland
- Genres: Folk, Rock
- Occupations: Singer, Songwriter
- Instruments: Vocals, keyboard, harmonica, guitar
- Years active: 1979–2003, 2008–2015, 2026-Present
- Spouse: Qiumei Chen (Annie Maccarthy)

James MacCarthy (born 1953) is an Irish singer-songwriter.

== Early life and career (1953–1979) ==
MacCarthy was born in Macroom, County Cork, Ireland, to Ted MacCarthy (died 1998) and Betty MacCarthy (died 2009). He has 11 siblings. For a time, the family had a business distributing newspapers and magazines across Munster.

MacCarthy left school at 15 without qualifications, and became a stable boy at Vincent O'Brien's place in Ballydoyle. After five years between Tipperary and Newmarket, Jimmy returned home to help his father, whose ill health had resulted in the closure of his business. He then made a living out of singing at pubs, and was later busking in the streets of London and doing occasional concerts, opening for other singers' gigs in Ireland.

MacCarthy became a musician from an early age, receiving his first guitar at the age of 7. At 12, he formed a garage band with his brother Dan with whom he played in a Legion of Mary gathering and at a "glorified hamburger joint" called the Shambles. When MacCarthy turned 19, he was performing in his native Cork in bars and folk clubs, including the Pirates Den, Crosshaven.

== Southpaw (1979–1980) ==
In the late 1970s, MacCarthy was already an established musician on the Cork rock circuit. Southpaw was MacCarthy's first band of note, which he formed with ex-Horslips guitarist Declan Sinnott, Johnny Campbell, Dave Whyte and Teddie Moynihan. MacCarthy was the band's acoustic guitar player and, together with Sinnott, wrote much of the band's own material. While in Southpaw, MacCarthy performed at venues such as Cork’s Connolly Hall, supporting John Martyn, the Manhattan Bar in Galway, the Festival Dome, the UCC Downtown Kampus, the Blue Shark in Kinsale, The Meeting Place on Dorset Street and some prestigious Dublin residencies.

== Becoming a solo performer (1981–1991) ==
Following Southpaw, MacCarthy became a solo performer and, through a deal with Mulligan Records, released two singles of his own in 1981, titled 'Miles of Eyes' and 'Like in the Movies'. MacCarthy stated that being a songwriter was what earned him his place in Southpaw. When Moving Hearts debuted MacCarthy's songs ‘Burning Star’ and ‘Strain of the Dance’ at the Rossnaree Hotel, Drogheda in late 1982 and released the latter on their 1983 album ‘Live Hearts’, it was only the following year that MacCarthy was booked to play a residency in the Cork Metropole, the Anchor Bar, Dunmore East, and Dublin’s National Stadium.

Initially, ‘Strain of the Dance’ was to be MacCarthy’s first single, but, due to its disturbing imagery and in respect to the victims of the Stardust tragedy and their families, he and Seamus O’Neill of Mulligan Records mutually settled on ‘Miles of Eyes’ instead. However, Moving Hearts' success with 'Strain of the Dance' gave MacCarthy the confidence to think of himself as a songwriter.

In the early 1980s, MacCarthy secured a number of support slots for other artists, including Chris de Burgh and Maura O'Connell and, while his debut single 'Miles of Eyes' wasn't a chart success, it received ongoing airplay on Irish radio for five weeks.

In his career, MacCarthy has toured with De Dannan and producers such as Donal Lunny.

== Releasing solo albums (1991–2003) ==
From the 1990s until the 2010s, MacCarthy had begun to release full albums, and his solo career was well underway.

While recording his debut album, MacCarthy teamed up with some of Ireland's most acclaimed musicians, including Liam O'Maonlai of the Hothouse Flowers, Bill Whelan, Davy Spillane and Honor Heffernan. The album 'The Song of the Singing Horseman', released in 1991, was commended for its "masterly blend of pop melodies, trad fiddles, Spanish guitars, country-and-western rhythms and chamber-music strings" and received critical acclaim for its rich imagery.

After releasing 'The Song of the Singing Horseman', MacCarthy saw some success as a solo performer of contemporary folk music. With the release of his second album 'The Dreamer' in 1994, MacCarthy wished to create a more universally appealing album that had a more urban feel to it. Coincidentally, when he was living in Wicklow, a chance encounter with his next-door neighbour determined the direction for this album. Prior to the release of 'The Dreamer', MacCarthy was listening to Van Morrison’s ’Avalon Sunset’ while he was driving through the Wicklow mountains. Impressed by the string arrangements, MacCarthy hoped he would be able to work with the musician who worked on those string arrangements on the album. MacCarthy recalled reading the name Fiachra Trench on the album sleeve, only to find that he was the man who had just moved next door to him. MacCarthy and Trench collaborated over the three-year recording of ’The Dreamer’, in ways as casual as talking over one another’s garden fence about song arrangements.

In October 1999, MacCarthy played at the National Concert Hall, Dublin as a special guest with the "fifth Beatle" George Martin, which was a dream for him as a longtime fan of the band. At the concert, MacCarthy performed a cover of the Beatles' song "She's Leaving Home".

In an interview shortly before his 2000 performance at Dublin's HQ, MacCarthy stated that he had converted an old cowshed in his Wicklow home into a studio to record his third album, while also setting up his own label titled 'Ride On Records' with promoter Pat Egan.

MacCarthy's third album, The Moment, which was released in the summer of 2002 featured co-writers on five tracks, including a song written with Graham Lyle (the songwriter of Tina Turner's "What's Love Got to Do with It?"). More firmly a pop-rock album than his first two recordings, the music on The Moment is predominantly guitar- and keyboard-based.

== Return to performing (2008–2015) ==
Between 2003 and 2008, MacCarthy took an extended hiatus from performing. Upon his return to the live scene, he played with a band consisting of Eleanor Healy (bass and vocals) and Martin Leahy (percussion and drums). He also performed solo at venues throughout Ireland. Since he returned to the live scene, MacCarthy performed new songs along with all the classics. In summer 2009, he made his first nationwide tour, doing gigs at venues such as the National Concert Hall, the Cork Opera House and Galway Town Hall.

In addition, MacCarthy has played at smaller venues, including in Kenmare, County Kerry, the town known as "Neidín", in Irish, after which he named his song "As I Leave Behind Neidín". Deryn O'Callaghan, manager of the Carnegie Arts Centre, has said that, after he had commemorated the town in one of his songs, Jimmy MacCarthy would have a warm welcome whenever he played the venue.

Prior to the release of his last album to date, MacCarthy had written over 100 new songs. A new album, Hey-Ho Believe, was released on 25 October 2010 and featured a new producer Donal Lunny. This album included other musicians such as Eoin O'Neill, Anto Drennan and Graham Henderson.

Following the release of Hey-Ho Believe and a short promotional tour, MacCarthy kept a low profile until April 2013, when he was inducted into the Irish Music Rights Organization (IMRO) Academy and announced further concert dates, including Dublin's Vicar Street. This tour lasted until 2015. MacCarthy has not performed live since then, although he has performed some new songs during performances on live radio. One song titled 'Prophecy/Conspiracy?', co-written with singer-songwriter Rob Burke, was performed on radio interviews. Additionally, a song MacCarthy wrote about his life growing up in Cork 'Roll On The Lee' was released as a charity single for Enable Ireland.

== The Electric Horsemen and the Acoustic Horsemen (2026-present) ==
As of 2026, MacCarthy is set to return to performing. First he was scheduled to play four intimate sold out shows at the White Horse in Ballincollig, Co. Cork on 25 May, 1 June, 8 June and 15 June 2026. This performance included a band, called "The Electric Horsemen", consisting of MacCarthy, Declan Sinnott, Johnny Campbell, Paul Seymour and Brian Calnan.

Following on from this, MacCarthy is due to perform with a new band known as "The Acoustic Horseman" at the Cork Opera House on 1 October and 20 October 2026 and the National Concert Hall in Dublin on 14 October 2026. The Cork Opera House and National Concert Hall shows are due to include performances from Nollaig Casey and string quartet performing arrangements by Casey and Bill Whelan, alongside special guest musicians including Steve Cooney, James Blennerhassett and Paul McAteer.

== Songwriting ==
MacCarthy is best known as a songwriter. Composing since the late 1970s, his songs have been recorded by many Irish artists including Christy Moore, Mary Black, Finbar Wright, Maura O'Connell, the Corrs and Westlife. "Ride On", recorded by Christy Moore, is one of his best-known compositions. Moore also recorded MacCarthy's songs "Missing You", "Bright Blue Rose" and "Mystic Lipstick". Mary Black, Maura O'Connell and The Corrs have recorded MacCarthy's "No Frontiers", while Black has also recorded his songs "Katie", "Adam at the Window", "Diamond Days", "As I Leave Behind Neidín", "Shuffle of the Buckled" and "Another Day." MacCarthy also co-wrote Westlife's "Angel's Wings." This track was meant to be a Christmas single for Westlife during that year but the band chose a different song. MacCarthy believes that if Westlife had released "Angel's Wings" as a single the chances were that it could have become a number one hit and that it would have been nice to have a song at the top of the UK charts.

More recently, MacCarthy's songs have been recorded by newer artists such as the Celtic Tenors, Michelle Lally, Marc Roberts, and Tommy O'Sullivan.

== Industry advocacy ==
MacCarthy has, throughout the years, expressed his frustrations with RTÉ for their lack of support for indigenous Irish artists. In particular, MacCarthy remembered the mid 80s to late 90s as a golden age for Irish artists on national radio, and RTÉ's output of local talent declined significantly, mostly just depending on songs from groups like The Corrs, The Cranberries, U2, Boyzone and Westlife that had international success for the 20% local talent they were expected to play. MacCarthy did ultimately make amends with the national broadcaster. He later gave RTE credit for reversing the decline of Irish artists on radio and conceded that the nation would be much poorer without them.

Additionally, in a speech he gave while being inducted to the IMRO Irish Songwriters Academy, MacCarthy discussed how, in recent times, traditional radio and television were being replaced by the internet as the means by which music and information are broadcast and disseminated. Understanding that American multinational corporations such as Google, as the core owners of products like the iPhone and smartphone, had poor track records of protecting author’s rights, MacCarthy requested that those in attendance be aware of the need to continue protecting the rights of songwriters for future generations. In another interview, MacCarthy clarified that he doesn't think technology is inherently the problem, but the way in which the individuals designing it and how it can be taken advantage of are. As MacCarthy was a Director-in-Board since the IMRO's inception. He saw how an institution like that, through the good work of Hugh Duffy, could improve circumstances for Irish composers.

== Influences ==
While MacCarthy is often assumed to have come from the folk tradition, he has on several occasions referred to himself as a "child of the radio". Growing up, MacCarthy loved Elvis Presley, Smokey Robinson and especially Dusty Springfield, and he made his first pay covering their songs in pubs. Some of MacCarthy's favourite songs included ‘Adios Amigo’ and ‘Liverpool Lou’ and, through bands like The Supremes and The Animals, he was introduced to electric guitars.

MacCarthy's written influences include the German-Swiss poet Hermann Hesse. MacCarthy was inspired by the lyrical flow in his books. Musically MacCarthy has named Paul Simon, Randy Newman and Tom Waits as being among his favourite lyricists of all time.

== Musicianship ==
MacCarthy established himself as a versatile musician, playing guitar with Southpaw and later learning to play piano himself, and gathering musicians with whom he would go on to record. MacCarthy formed the Jimmy McCarthy band with his fellow ex-Southpaw member Johnny Campbell, as well as pianist James Delaney and Paul Moran of Paul Brady and Begley Boys fame respectively, as well as another Cork native Brian Calnan and Eoghan O’Neill.

MacCarthy revealed that he sought to be a pop singer from the age of 19, but, from the release of his debut album 'The Song of the Singing Horseman' in 1991, his music took a shift towards being more folk-oriented.

In the late 90s and early 2000s, when MacCarthy was established as a prolific songwriter and an esteemed solo performer, his style of performance was regarded as being closer to the style of Martin Hayes or Andy Irvine than those employed by the rock acts. Upon the release of his single 'The People of West Cork & Kerry' in 2001, MacCarthy was asked whom he would compare his performance style to. MacCarthy named James Taylor as the performer most like him, due to the fact he plays guitar and piano on stage, and had two backing singers. In MacCarthy's case, these backing singers were Lynn Kavanagh and Mandy Murphy.

== Music ==
MacCarthy's music has been described as folky power-pop, but it can also be classed as folk-rock. MacCarthy's first singles "Miles of Eyes" and "Like in the Movies" would fit this description, but his later works ranged anywhere from contemporary folk to folk pop.

MacCarthy's lyrics and the meanings of his songs are widely debated. In particular, his most famous composition, 'Ride On', is often thought to be a particularly complex song, although MacCarthy has always said it is simply a song about dying and the inevitability of it happening, no matter what happens in life. Forms of parting can vary from the loss of loved ones through death, breakup, or any other causes and, no matter what happens, the only thing you can't do is not go forward. MacCarthy wrote two verses and a chorus for what would become ’Ride On’ in an inspired 10 minutes while awaiting a lift on Cork’s Barrack Street. MacCarthy said that the deeper element that people miss lies in the fact 'Ride On' tells a tale of two people going separate paths because one doesn’t believe in bloodshed, and them being lovers adds an extra layer of loss.

MacCarthy, who has always been outspoken on his views on Irish history and current affairs, likes to include deeper subject matter in his songs, in addition to meaning that seems superficially simplistic. In live performances, MacCarthy juxtaposed the sentimental feelings of nationhood and belonging with a degree of social critique on Ireland in the late twentieth century. Whenever MacCarthy set to lay out the facts, he would do so with great caution. In the song 'Mystic Lipstick', MacCarthy chose not to say who was right or wrong, but to present the course of Ireland in the twentieth century through facts conveyed in metaphor. The opening line "She wears Mystic Lipstick" is, according to MacCarthy, the national voice, how the Irish speak as a poetic nation rooted as much in imagination as they are in the sod. Conversely, the line "She wears stones and bones" refers to the people that the Irish were and the stones at which they prayed. Lines like ”She wears wings of hope” suggest the hope that Irish people held onto, to overcome oppression, and how Gerry Adams’ comments about freedom mirror what Pearse and Connolly said so long ago.

In addition to MacCarthy's own four studio albums, albums celebrating his work have been released over the years.

=== Tribute albums ===
As of 2017, there have been two tribute albums released celebrating the work of Jimmy MacCarthy. The first was a collection by popular artists that have recorded his songs and the second was by his long-time friend Mary Black.

==== Warmer for the Spark ====
In 1998, MacCarthy released an album together with Tommy Fleming, Frances Black, Mary Black, Christy Moore, Maura O Connell and Mary Coughlan, which they named Warmer for the Spark; the songs of Jimmy MacCarthy Volume One. MacCarthy wrote every song on this album and sang two of his own.

==== Mary Black Sings Jimmy MacCarthy ====
In 2017, Mary Black released an album celebrating MacCarthy's work. This album includes the songs by MacCarthy that Black is known for, such as 'No Frontiers', 'Katie' and 'Adam At The Window', classics never recorded by her, like 'Mystic Lipstick', a new song 'Love's Last Chance', and a live recording of Black and MacCarthy both singing 'As I Leave Behind Neidin'. MacCarthy was very pleased with Black's work on this album, particularly the new songs.

== Personal life ==
Throughout his career, MacCarthy has lived in various parts of Ireland. Once he was making a stable income from his songwriting royalties, he found houses to buy and renovate. Firstly, in 1995, he bought a then 500-year-old, rundown farmhouse in Wicklow that required much work. MacCarthy restored the stables on this house, until it was destroyed in a blaze, along with the recording studios he had set up in the outhouses.

Years later, MacCarthy said that, his roots in Cork were calling when he found Jenkinstown House in Kilkenny. He opted to purchase and renovate this property over the course of six years, and put it on the market in 2019 and sold in 2020 for €705,000.

While MacCarthy lived alone for many years, the thought he might remain a bachelor crossed his mind, when he was seeing someone but not yet married by the age of 47. In 2013, when MacCarthy was single and living alone, he said poverty had been an obstacle for him getting married for most of his life and, when he was in a position where he could get married, he had already become very bachelor-like, often leaving because he was drawn to songwriting.

On 2 December 2020, MacCarthy married his Chinese fiancee Chen Qiumei, with whom he founded the Europe-China Culture and Art Exchange Association and Chinese and foreign family Association. She has a daughter and son-in-law. The couple's work has involved gathering musicians to organize anti-epidemic public welfare activities.

== Freedom of Macroom ==
MacCarthy was awarded the keys of Macroom in April 2008 for his achievements in songwriting. He was only the third person to be awarded the freedom of the town. He was presented with the keys by mayor Pat O'Connell.

== Europe-China Culture & Art Exchange Research Association (current work 2020–present) ==
While MacCarthy took a 10-year break from performing from 2020, himself and his wife Chen Quimei promoted the public welfare cause of European-Chinese cultural and artistic exchanges. Quimei is the president of the Europe-China Culture & Art Exchange Research Association, while MacCarthy served as the honorary president.

MacCarthy and Quimei lead the European Chinese Culture and Arts Exchange and Cooperation Research Association and the Chinese and foreign International Family Association, which are both involved in international joint anti-epidemic welfare activities between Europe and China, in an effort to build a multi-dimensional and diversified bridge for cultural and artistic exchanges between Europe and China. The organization is composed of artists and related cultural and art institutions from Europe and China. Their headquarters is in Ireland but branches have been established in Europe and many places in China.

== Discography ==
Albums:

- The Song of the Singing Horseman (1991)
- The Dreamer (1994)
- Warmer For The Spark - The Songs Of Jimmy MacCarthy (1997) (Various artists, including Jimmy MacCarthy)
- The Moment (2002)
- Hey-Ho Believe (2010)

Singles:

- "Miles of Eyes"/"Shuffle of the Buckled" (Mulligan, 1981)
- "Like in the Movies"/"Cherry Blossom Blue" (Mulligan, 1981)
- "Adam at the Window"/"The Grip of Parallel" (from The Song of the Singing Horseman; Solid Records, 1987)
- "Mystic Lipstick"/"A Hard Man To Follow"/"On My Enchanted Sight" (from The Song of the Singing Horseman; Mulligan, 1991)
- "Lorraine" (from The Dreamer; Sony Music, 1994)
- "My Singing Bird"/"The Mad Lady and Me" (from Warmer for the Spark; Dara Records, 1998)
- "The Contender"/ "My Singing Bird" (Ride on Records, 1998)
- "The People of West Cork and Kerry"/"Sky Road" (non-album tracks; Ride on Records; 2000)
- "The Music of Love" (from The Moment; Ride on Records, 2002)
- "Hey-Ho Believe"/"Christian Telephone" (CDr promo from the album Hey-Ho Believe; currently unavailable as a physical single but used for airplay; 2010)
- "Roll On The Lee" (charity single for Enable Ireland; Ride On Records, 2017)
