= Shaun Davey =

Northern Irish composer (born 1948)

- Origin: Belfast, Northern Ireland
- Genres: Celtic; Classical
- Occupations: Composer, singer
- Years active: 1977–present

Shaun Davey (born 18 January 1948) is an Irish composer.

== Early years ==
Shaun Davey was born in Belfast in 1948 and attended Rockport School in County Down. He graduated from Trinity College, Dublin in the history of Art in 1971. He then took a master's degree at the Courtauld Institute of Art in London. In the late 1970s, he made his first recording, Davey and Morris, with James Morris, and guest artist Dónal Lunny, produced by Tony Hooper of The Strawbs. He worked as a composer of advertising jingles, including "The Pride of the Herd" for the National Dairy Council, 7up, Bank of Ireland and many more.

== Orchestral music relating to Ireland ==
Davey's reputation is built on four large-scale concert works based on Irish history, all using uilleann pipes and folk tunes.

1. The Brendan Voyage (1980) depicts the journey taken by explorer Tim Severin, in 1978, from Ireland across the Atlantic to Newfoundland in a leather currach. Severin's journey was a recreation of the one allegedly made by Saint Brendan. The style is similar to that of film composer John Williams. The work uses the traditional uilleann pipes to represent the small currach, while the rest of the orchestra represents the conditions, islands and wildlife encountered by the boat.
2. The Pilgrim (1983) is set in a vaguely medieval world where the Irish, the Bretons and Scots explore the seas of western Europe. It exists in two versions: the 1983 recording made at the Lorient Interceltic Festival, and an expanded version recorded mostly in the 1990s.
3. Granuaile (1985) tells the story of Gráinne O'Malley, an Irish pirate queen in the 16th century. It has more songs than the previous works and features the voice of Rita Connolly (who married Davey soon after). Dónal Lunny again contributed as a session musician. It is a homophonic piece of music set in the re mode and was also accompanied by a chamber orchestra.
4. The Relief of Derry Symphony (1990) has a more obvious symphonic structure. It is based around the 17th century Siege of Derry, showing the Protestants inside and the Catholics outside the beleaguered city. Whereas the previous three works involved uilleann piper Liam O'Flynn, this one uses a Scottish bagpipe band, who enter the auditorium from behind the audience.

== Other recordings ==
May We Never Have To Say Goodbye, released by the Tara Music label, is a collaboration between Davey, the RTÉ National Symphony Orchestra and a number of famous artists. The album takes its name from the anthem specially composed for the Opening Ceremony of the Special Olympics World Summer Games in Croke Park, June 2003, and performed by Rita Connolly, Ronan Tynan and six Dublin choirs. It is presented along with a range of music from Davey's suite, featuring traditional soloists, singers, choir, pipe band, and orchestra, together with percussion. This release also includes previously unrecorded pieces from The Pilgrim, along with (among others): "Fill to me the Parting Glass" (from the film score of Waking Ned), and "Music of the Spheres", a magical piece from the Royal Shakespeare Company production of Pericles.

Beal Tuinne – Live at St. James' church Dingle (TARA4022) is a collection of songs composed by Davey with lyrics based on the poems of the late Kerry Poet Caoimhín Ó Cinnéide. Davey is joined on this recording by his wife Rita Connolly and Dingle-based musicians: Séamus Begley, Eilís Kennedy, Lawrence Courtney, Eoin Ó Beaglaoich, Daithí Ó Sé and Jim Murray.

Voices from the Merry Cemetery (TARA4023) is a suite of songs again composed by Davey but this time based on grave inscriptions from the cemetery—known as the Merry Cemetery—of the village of Săpânța on Romania's border with Ukraine. For this live recording, Davey has again teamed up with Connolly (vocals) and O'Flynn (uilleann pipes), as well as the Romanian Men's Choir of the Theology Faculty, Sibiu, directed by Pr. Dr. Sorin Dobre and sections from the Romanian State Philharmonia, conducted by David Brophy.

== Film composer ==
Davey has worked on numerous films. His most famous film score has been Waking Ned Devine (1998), with contributions from John McSherry, Liam Ó Maonlaí, The Voice Squad, Nollaig Casey and Arty McGlynn. His other scores include Twelfth Night, The Tailor of Panama, David Copperfield, and The Lion, the Witch and the Wardrobe. Television work includes The Hanging Gale for the BBC (the score won an Ivor Novello and was nominated for a BAFTA) and the theme to Ballykissangel (nominated for a BAFTA). In 2000, he collaborated with Richard Nelson on the musical James Joyce's The Dead which was performed on Broadway, for which the score was nominated for a Tony.

Other notable work remains Granuaile, which features Connolly's soaring soprano voice. Liam O'Flynn's solo album Out to an Other Side (1993) had several tracks written by Davey. He also created a setting of St. Patrick's Breastplate titled The Deer's Cry, first used on the soundtrack of the TV documentary Who Bombed Birmingham and later included on his album The Pilgrim.

== Selected discography ==
=== Feature Film Soundtracks ===
- Twelfth Night, (1996), Silva Screen Music America
- Waking Ned, (1998), London Records
- The Tailor of Panama, (2001), Varèse Sarabande
- The Abduction Club, (2002), Silva Screen Music, (FILMCD 362)

=== Television Soundtracks ===
- The Hanging Gale, (1995), BBC/Virgin
- Ballykissangel, (1997), BBC/Virgin, (VTCD117)

=== Theatre Soundtracks ===
The Lion, the Witch and the Wardrobe, (1999), Royal Shakespeare Company, (61021)

=== Orchestral suites ===
- The Brendan Voyage (1980), Tara, (TARA3006)
- The Pilgrim (1983), Tara, (TARA3032)
- Granuaile (1985), Tara, (TARA3017)
- The Relief of Derry Symphony (1990), Tara, (TARA3024)
- May We Never Have To Say Goodbye (Special Olympics World Summer Games 2003), (2003), Tara/RTE, (TARA4017)
- Voices from the Merry Cemetery, (2009), Tara, (TARA4023)
