= Between the Jigs and the Reels: A Retrospective =

Compilation album by Planxty
- Released: 28 October 2016
- Recorded: Command Studios, London (1972); Escape Studios, Kent, UK (1973); Sarm Studios, London (1974); Windmill Lane Studios (1979); Windmill Lane Studios (1980); Windmill Lane Studios (1983)
- Genre: Irish folk
- Length: 77:08
- Label: Universal Music Ireland
- Producer: Dónal Lunny; Phil Coulter; Dónal Lunny & Bill Whelan

Planxty chronology
Live 2004 (2004)	Between the Jigs and the Reels: A Retrospective (2016)

Between the Jigs and the Reels: A Retrospective is a two-disc anthology by the Irish folk band Planxty. It includes a 17-track CD and a 36-track DVD with over two hours of previously unreleased footage (1972–1982) from RTÉ archives.

== Recording ==
=== CD ===
All but two tracks are re-released from the following albums:

- Planxty (1973) – (tracks: 3, 4, 12, 15),
- The Well Below the Valley (1973) – (tracks: 2, 11),
- Cold Blow and the Rainy Night (1974) – (track 5),
- After the Break (1979) – (tracks: 7, 10, 14),
- The Woman I Loved So Well (1980) – (tracks: 1, 13),
- Words & Music (1983) – (tracks: 6, 8, 9)

Two tracks are re-released from earlier singles: one is "Nancy Spain" (track 16) from 1981, and the other is Timedance (track 17), a three-part suite recorded with full orchestra and rhythm section. The latter was also performed during the interval of the Eurovision Song Contest, held in Dublin on 4 April 1981, and was the genesis of the work Bill Whelan would later compose for Riverdance.

=== DVD ===
The DVD features footage recorded during the following live performances:

- Live from The Late Late Show (1972) – (track 1),
- The Music Makers, Live from the National Stadium (1973) – (tracks: 2–10),
- Live from the Abbey Tavern (1980) – (tracks: 11–18),
- Live Aisling Gheal Special (1980) – (tracks: 19–22),
- Festival Fold, Live from the National Stadium (1982) – (tracks: 23–36)

== Critical reception ==
Between the Jigs and the Reels:A Retrospective received positive reviews from folk music critics.

In her review of the compilation for The Irish Times (28 October 2016), Siobhan Long stated:

- "The boys are back. This CD/DVD is a timely reminder, 44 years after their debut, of the revolutionary musical imaginations that fuelled Planxty's music and shaped so much of what has happened since then in the world of traditional music."
- "There is a healthy balance between the show-stoppers (Little Musgrave) and the infinite complexities of the tunes (Baneasa's Green Glade), with plenty of space in between to make room for every listener."
- "The gargantuan DVD, bursting with outtakes from a slew of RTÉ recordings, is a treasure trove, with complementary versions of seminal recordings that will have ally self-respecting trad anoraks comparing and contrasting album and DVD for months."
- "Between the Jigs and the Reels is also striking for the riches of Planxty's ensemble contributions: all multi-instrumentalists, with three vocalists rambling from the west coast of Clare to the furthest reaches of eastern Europe, propelled by calculus-like rhythms and genteel vocals."

In his review of the compilation for the Irish Examiner (26 October 2016), Ed Power added:

- "Planxty are one of those seminal Irish acts doomed to bask in an aura of reverence while remaining essentially obscure to all but a tiny subset of the listening public."
- "A new overview of their accomplishments, may go towards restoring the group to the prominence folk purists agree they deserve."

In his review of the compilation (5 October 2016), Roddie Cleere (of Roddie Cleere's Irish Music Show (IMS)) stated:

- "This wonderful and impressively assembled collection tells the story of a morphing ensemble of musicians, songwriters, collectors, arrangers, and singers with a mutual lust for the discovery of music from different times and different places. The songs and tunes they collected and arranged, including everything from soft introverted ballads to whirling regional fiddle tunes, from haunting airs to skittering Balkan jams, all somehow made sense within this unique narrative of traditional and folk music they had sculpted and named Planxty."
- "This package of Planxty music is an arduously-curated goldmine of recordings, TV appearances and live sets that both the band and their fans deserve. Delve in. Lose yourself in it."

== Track listing ==
=== CD ===
All titles credited as "Traditional" and arranged by: "Andy Irvine, Dónal Lunny, Christy Moore, Liam O'Flynn", except where indicated.

1. "True Love Knows No Season (Billy Gray)" (song) (Norman Blake) – 5:29
2. "Pat Reilly" (song) – 3:15
3. "Sí Bheag, Sí Mhór" (waltz) (Turlough O'Carolan) – 3:33
4. "Follow Me Up to Carlow" (song) – 2:20
5. "Băneasă's Green Glade"/"Mominsko Horo" (song/Bulgarian dance) (Andy Irvine)/(Trad., Arr. A. Irvine, D. Lunny) – 5:48
6. "Aconry Lasses"/"The Old Wheels Of The World"/"The Spike Island Lasses" (reels) – 3:32
7. "The Pursuit Of Farmer Michael Hayes" (song) – 6:10
8. "Accidentals"/"Aragon Mill" (instrumental/song) (Andy Irvine)/(Si Kahn) – 6:02
9. "The Irish Marche" (Irish clan march) (Traditional/William Byrd, Arr. Liam O'Flynn, Dónal Lunny, Bill Whelan) – 3:37
10. "The Rambling Siúler" (song) – 4:19
11. "The Well Below the Valley" (song) – 5:30
12. "Junior Crehan's Favourite/Corney is Coming" (reels) – 2:36
13. "Roger O'Hehir" (song) – 5:33
14. "Smeceno Horo" (Bulgarian dance) – 4:32
15. "The West Coast of Clare" (song) (Traditional, Arr. Andy Irvine) – 5:30
16. "Nancy Spain" (song) – 3:32
17. Timedance:
  a. "The Humours of Barrack Street" (reel) (Trad., Arr. Liam O'Flynn, Dónal Lunny, Christy Moore, Bill Whelan) – 1:30
  b. "Isercleran" (slow air/waltz) (Dónal Lunny, Bill Whelan) – 2:35
  c. "Ballymun Regatta" (slip jig) (Dónal Lunny, Bill Whelan) – 2:25

=== DVD ===
All titles credited as "Traditional" and arranged by: "Andy Irvine, Dónal Lunny, Christy Moore, Liam O'Flynn", except where indicated.

1. "The Blacksmith"/"Blacksmithereens" (song/Bulgarian dance) (Trad., Arr. Andy Irvine, Dónal Lunny)
2. "Three Drunken Maidens"/"The Foxhunter's Reel" (song/reel)
3. "When First Unto This Country" (song)
4. "Sweet Thames Flow Softly" (song) (Ewan MacColl)
5. "The Gold Ring" (jig)
6. "Hey! Sandy" (song) (Harvey Andrews)
7. "Kitty Gone A Milking/Music Of The Forge" (reels)
8. "Only Our Rivers" (song) (Mickey MacConnell)
9. "Raggle Taggle Gypsy/Tabhair Dom Do Lámh" (song/slow air)
10. "Three Drunken Maidens"/"The Foxhunter's Reel" (song/reel) (Reprise)
11. "The Good Ship Kangaroo" (song)
12. "Ride A Mile/Hardiman The Fiddler/The Yellow Wattle" (jigs)
13. "The Hackler From Grouse Hall" (song)
14. "An Bonnán Buí/The West Wind" (reel)
15. "The Jolly Beggar/The Wise Maid" (song/reel)
16. "Sally Brown" (sea shanty)
17. "Bean Pháidin"/"Rakish Paddy" (song)
18. "Little Musgrave" (song)
19. "East At Glendart/Brian O'Lynn/Pay The Reckoning" (double jigs)
20. "The Lady On The Island/The Gatehouse Maid/The Virginia/Callaghan's" (reels)
21. "As I Roved Out (Andy)" (song)
22. "Smeceno Horo" (Bulgarian dance)
23. "Johnny of Brady's Lea" (song)
24. "The Pullet/The Ladies Pantalettes" (reels)
25. "I Pity The Poor Immigrant" (song) (Bob Dylan)
26. "Arthur McBride" (song)
27. "True Love Knows No Season (Billy Gray)" (song) (Norman Blake)
28. Timedance:
  a. "The Humours of Barrack Street" (reel) (Traditional, Arr. Liam O'Flynn, Dónal Lunny, Christy Moore, Bill Whelan)
  b. "Isercleran" (slow air/waltz) (Dónal Lunny, Bill Whelan)
  c. "Ballymun Regatta" (slip jig) (Dónal Lunny, Bill Whelan)
29. "You Rambling Boys Of Pleasure" (song)
30. "The Good Ship Kangaroo" (song)
31. "Táimse Im' Chodladh" (slow air)
32. "Thousands Are Sailing" (song)
33. "Queen Of The Rushes"/"Paddy Fay's" (jigs)
34. "Little Musgrave" (song)
35. "The Scholar/The Chattering Magpie/Lord McDonald's/The Virginia/Callaghan's" (reels)
36. "Cliffs of Dooneen" (song)

== Personnel ==
CD

- Christy Moore – vocals, guitar, bodhrán, keyboard
- Andy Irvine – vocals, mandolin, mandola, bouzouki, harmonica, hurdy-gurdy
- Dónal Lunny – bouzouki, guitars, bodhrán, vocals
- Liam O'Flynn – uilleann pipes, tin whistles
- Matt Molloy – flute (tracks 1, 7, 10, 13, 14)
- Bill Whelan – keyboards (tracks 1, 6, 8, 9, 13, 16, 17)
- Noel Hill – concertina (tracks 1, 13)
- Tony Linnane : fiddle (tracks 1, 13)
- Nollaig Casey – fiddle (tracks 6, 8, 9, 16, 17)
- James Kelly – fiddle (tracks 6, 8, 9)
- Paul McAteer – Drums (track 17)
- John Drummond – Bass (track 17)
- Mike Nolan, Benny McNeill, Davy Martin, John Tate and Jack Boyle – Brass Section (track 17)
- Audrey Park: Concert Mistress (track 17)

DVD

- Christy Moore – vocals, guitar, bodhrán, keyboard
- Andy Irvine – vocals, mandolin, mandola, bouzouki, harmonica, hurdy-gurdy
- Dónal Lunny – bouzouki, guitars, bodhrán, vocals
- Liam O'Flynn – uilleann pipes, tin whistles

== Charts ==
Chart (2016)	Peak position
Irish Albums (IRMA)	10
