= Prosperous (album) =

Album by Christy Moore

Studio album by Christy Moore
- Released: 1972
- Recorded: Prosperous, County Kildare
- Genre: Folk
- Length: 38:56
- Label: Tara Music
- Producer: Bill Leader

Christy Moore chronology
Paddy on the Road (1969)	Prosperous (1972)	Whatever Tickles Your Fancy (1975)

Professional ratings
Review scores
Source	Rating
Allmusic	link

Prosperous is the second album by Irish folk musician Christy Moore, released in 1972. His first album, Paddy on the Road, was recorded by Dominic Behan in 1969 and has long been out of print. In addition to Moore's guitar and voice, Prosperous featured musicians Andy Irvine (mandolin, mouth organ), Liam Óg O'Flynn (uilleann pipes, tin whistle) and Dónal Lunny (guitar, bouzouki). These four musicians later gave themselves the name Planxty, making this album something of the first Planxty album in all but name. Other musicians included Kevin Conneff (later of The Chieftains) on bodhrán, Clive Collins on fiddle, and Dave Bland on concertina.

The album takes its name from the town of Prosperous, County Kildare, where it was recorded by producer Bill Leader in the summer of 1971 in Downings House. The house features on the front cover of the album and was owned by Dr Andrew Rynne, surgeon and medical practitioner and founder of Clane General Hospital in County Kildare.

The majority of the songs on the album are traditional, with the exception of "James Connolly" by established folk singer Patrick Galvin, "Tribute to Woody" (about Woody Guthrie) by Bob Dylan (originally titled "Song to Woody"), "The Ludlow Massacre", by Guthrie, "A Letter to Syracuse" by English folksingers Dave Cartwright and Bill Caddick, and "I Wish I Was in England", an early composition by Moore, who would go on to establish himself as a significant songwriter of Irish music. The album opens with a medley of the traditional song "The Raggle Taggle Gipsies" and the harp tune "Tabhair dom do Lámh", which would be the opening track of Planxty's self-titled album released the following year.

== LP track listing ==
All tracks Traditional; arranged by Christy Moore; except where indicated

=== Side one ===
1. "The Raggle Taggle Gipsies"/"Tabhair Dom Do Lámh"
2. "The Dark Eyed Sailor"
3. "I Wish I Was in England" (Christy Moore)
4. "Lock Hospital"
5. "James Connolly" (Patrick Galvin)
6. "The Hackler from Grouse Hall"

=== Side two ===
1. "Tribute to Woody" (Bob Dylan)
2. "The Ludlow Massacre" (Woody Guthrie)
3. "A Letter to Syracuse" (Dave Cartwright, Bill Caddick)
4. "Spancill Hill"
5. "The Cliffs of Dooneen"
6. "Rambling Robin"

== Personnel ==
- Christy Moore – vocals, guitar
- Dónal Lunny – guitar, bouzouki
- Andy Irvine – mandolin, harmonica
- Liam O'Flynn – uilleann pipes, tin whistle
- Clive Collins – fiddle
- Dave Bland – concertina
- Kevin Conneff – bodhrán
