= Live 2004 (Planxty album) =

Live album by Planxty
- Released: 2004
- Recorded: Glór Theatre, Ennis, County Clare; Vicar Street, Dublin
- Genre: Irish folk
- Length: 67:09
- Label: Sony
- Producer: Dónal Lunny

Planxty chronology
Words & Music (1983)	Live 2004 (2004)	Between the Jigs and the Reels: A Retrospective (2016)

Live 2004 is an album recorded live by the Irish folk band Planxty.

== Recording ==
This live album was recorded during Planxty's third reunion (dubbed "The Third Coming"), which unfolded in late 2003 and into early 2004.

Initial rehearsals at the Royal Spa Hotel in Lisdoonvarna, County Clare were followed by a gig there on Saturday, 11 October 2003 in front of 200 people.

Planxty then played a series of concerts at the Glór Theatre in Ennis, County Clare (on 23 & 24 January 2004) and at Vicar Street in Dublin (on 30 & 31 January and on 4 & 5, 11 & 12 February 2004), which were recorded and from which selected material was released on the present CD and its associated DVD.

Another round of concerts took place in late 2004 and early 2005 in Galway, Belfast, Dublin and London.

== Track listing ==
1. "The Starting Gate" – 4:38
2. "The Good Ship Kangaroo" – 4:31
3. "The Clare Jig" – 3:14
4. "Arthur McBride" – 3:59
5. "Little Musgrave" – 9:20
6. "The Vicar St. Reels (2004)" – 4:21
7. "The Blacksmith" (trad.)/"Black Smithereens" (A. Irvine) – 5:03
8. "The Dark Slender Boy" – 4:37
9. "As Christy Roved Out" – 4:01
10. "As Andy Roved Out" – 5:17
11. "The Kildareman's Fancy" – 4:15
12. "Raggle Taggle Gypsy"/"Tabhair Dom Do Lámh" – 5:46
13. "The West Coast of Clare" (A. Irvine) – 6:05
14. "O'Dwyer of The Glen" – 2:02

== Personnel ==
- Christy Moore - vocals, guitar, bodhrán, keyboard
- Andy Irvine - vocals, mandolin, mandola, bouzouki
- Dónal Lunny - bouzouki, guitars, bodhrán, vocals
- Liam O'Flynn - uilleann pipes, tin whistles
