= Planxty (album) =

Album by Planxty

Studio album by Planxty
- Released: Early 1973
- Recorded: Early September 1972
- Studio: Command Studios, London
- Genre: Irish folk music
- Length: 41:53
- Label: Polydor, Shanachie Records
- Producer: Phil Coulter

Planxty chronology
Planxty (1973)	The Well Below The Valley (1973)

Professional ratings
Review scores
Source	Rating
Allmusic	4.5/5 stars

Planxty is the first album by the Irish folk group Planxty, recorded in London during early September 1972 and released in early 1973.

== Overview ==
Because of its dark cover, Planxty is sometimes referred to as "the black album." Author Leagues O'Toole has written that the album "crystallises the 1972 set" performed live by the band during their first year of touring.

The album features a variety of traditional and modern Irish folk songs and tunes. It was influential in popularising this genre. The last track revealed the impact of Balkan folk music on mandolinist Andy Irvine. The traditional song "The Blacksmith" concludes with Irvine playing "Blacksmithereens", a tune reflecting the influences he gathered during his travels in Eastern Europe.

Although Planxty is nominally the first album by the band, all four members performed together on Christy Moore's previous album Prosperous, which opened with the same song, "Raggle Taggle Gypsy/Tabhair dom do Lámh". An earlier recording of "Sí Bheag, Sí Mhór" had been included as a b-side to Planxty's first single, "Three Drunken Maidens".

Recordings completed during the sessions but excluded from the album were new versions of the singles "Three Drunken Maidens" and "The Cliffs of Dooneen", as well as "When First unto this Country" (sung by Lunny) and the traditional Southern Appalachian song "Down In The Valley" featuring all members of the band, including O'Flynn on vocal harmonies. The latter track has since been released on Christy Moore's 2004 box set.

== Track listing ==
1. "Raggle Taggle Gypsy/Tabhair Dom Do Lámh" (song/waltz) – 4:25
  (Traditional; arranged by Moore, O'Flynn, Irvine, Lunny)
2. "Arthur McBride" (song) – 2:51
  (Traditional; arranged by Moore, O'Flynn, Irvine, Lunny)
3. "Planxty Irwin" (Turlough O'Carolan) (planxty) – 2:14
  (Traditional; arranged by Moore, O'Flynn, Irvine, Lunny)
4. "Sweet Thames Flow Softly" (song) – 3:09
  (Ewan MacColl)
5. "Junior Crehan's Favourite/Corney is Coming" (reels) – 2:36
  (Traditional; arranged by Moore, O'Flynn, Irvine, Lunny)
6. "The West Coast of Clare" (song) – 5:30
  (Andy Irvine)
7. "The Jolly Beggar/The Wise Maid" (song/reel) – 4:23
  (Traditional; arranged by Moore, O'Flynn, Irvine, Lunny)
8. "Only Our Rivers" (song) – 4:04
  (Mickey MacConnell)
9. "Sí Bheag, Sí Mhór" (waltz) – 3:33
  (Turlough O'Carolan, arranged by Moore, O'Flynn, Irvine, Lunny)
10. "Follow Me Up to Carlow" (song) – 2:20
  (Traditional; arranged by Moore, O'Flynn, Irvine, Lunny)
11. "Merrily Kissed the Quaker" (slide) – 2:39
  (Traditional; arranged by Moore, O'Flynn, Irvine, Lunny)
12. "The Blacksmith" (song) – 4:09
  (Traditional; arranged by Moore, O'Flynn, Irvine, Lunny)

For a detailed analysis of this album's contents see the Irishtune.info album page.

== Personnel ==
- Christy Moore - vocals, guitar, bodhrán
- Andy Irvine - vocals, mandolin, bouzouki, harmonica, hurdy-gurdy
- Dónal Lunny - synthesizer, bouzouki, vocals
- Liam O'Flynn - uilleann pipes, tin whistle
