= Live 2004 =

Live 2004 may refer to:

- Live 2004 (Planxty album) by the Irish folk band Planxty
- NBA Live 2004
