= Rory Dall O'Cahan =

Irish harper and composer

Ruairí Dall Ó Catháin (anglicized: Rory Dall O'Cahan) may have been an Irish harper and composer. Recent research, however, raises the question whether he ever really existed. He is said to have been born circa 1580 in County Antrim and to have died circa 1653 at Eglinton Castle.

== Background ==
All current knowledge about Ó Catháin is based on anecdotes by the harper Arthur O'Neill, retold by Edward Bunting (1840), Charlotte Milligan Fox (1911), and Francis O'Neill (1913). Captain Francis O'Neill explained the uncertainty concerning his lifetime, stating he lived c.1570 to 1650 and that he was active during the first half of the 17th century.

According to Arthur O'Neill, unlike the vast number of travelling musicians, Ó Catháin was a gentleman by birth, his sept being hereditary allies of the O'Neill dynasty. Their territory was Keenaght (barony), now part of County Londonderry in Northern Ireland. Reflecting his origins, Ó Catháin "traveled into Scotland attended by the retinue of a gentle man of large property, and when in Scotland, according to the accounts preserved there also, he seemed to have traveled in the company of noble persons."

== Compositions ==
Ó Catháin's best-known composition is Give Me Your Hand (Irish: Tabhair dom do Lámh, Latin: Da mihi manum), published originally under its Latin title.

There is an anecdote about its composition:

"Proud and spirited, he resented anything in the nature of trespass on his dignity. Among his visits to the houses of Scottish nobility, he is said to have called at Eglinton Castle, Ayrshire. Knowing he was a harper, but being unaware of his rank, Lady Eglinton commanded him to play a tune. Taking offence at her peremptory manner, Ó Catháin refused and left the castle. When she found out who her guest was her ladyship sought and effected a speedy reconciliation. This incident furnished a theme for one of the harper's best compositions. Tabhair Damh do Lámh (or Give Me Your Hand). The name has been Latinized into Da Mihi Manum. The fame of the composition and the occasion which gave birth to it reaching the ear of King James the Sixth, induced him to send for the composer. Ó Catháin accordingly attended at the Scottish court and created a sensation."

"His performance so delighted the royal circle that King James I familiarly laid his royal hand on the harper's shoulder. When asked by one of the courtiers if he realized the honour thus conferred on him, to their consternation Rory replied: 'A greater than King James has laid his hand on my shoulder'. Who was that man?' cried the King. 'O'Neill, Sire', proudly answered Rory standing up."

In the late 20th century, the piece was wedded to Raggle Taggle Gypsy in a version by Planxty and has since enjoyed a huge resurgence.

== Other compositions ==
Bruce Armstrong attributed the following pieces to Ó Catháin:

- Lude's Supper
- The Terror of Death
- The Fiddler's Content
- Rorie Dall's Sister's Lament
- The Derry Air

O'Neill thought that Port Athol, Port Gordon, and Port Lennox, were all Ó Catháin's.

Seabhac Bheal Atha Seanaigh/The Hawk of Ballyshannon, celebrating the wedding of Charles O'Donnell, son of Manus of Rosturk Mulranny, County Mayo, to a Miss More, composed to a tune by Ruairí Dall Ó Catháin is printed in Bunting (1840, p. 13).

Robert Burns’ poem “Ae Fond Kiss” was first published using a tune entitled “Rory Dall’s Port”. It appears that the melody sung by Eddi Reader and other popular singers today is derived from this. “Rory Dall’s Port” is sometimes credited to Ruaidrí Dáll Ó Catháin. It could also have been written by Ruairidh Morison ‘An Clàrsair Dall’ (‘The Blind Harper’), or James Oswald, who first published the tune in Volume 8 of “The Caledonian Pocket Companion.”

== Death ==
O'Neill reports that he died in Scotland:

"It is a curious coincidence that after spending many years with McLeod, of Dunvegan, in the Isle of Skye, O'Cahan should die at Eglinton Castle about the year 1653. In some inaccountable way during his long sojourn in Scotland he became known as Rory Dall Morrison, and this has so clouded his origin and identity as to involve his very nationality in question."

O'Neill was, however, mistaken as their lives didn't even overlap, Morrison being born on the Isle of Lewis around 1656 while Ó Catháin was born in Antrim in the 1580s. Ruaidrí Dáll Mac Ghille Mhoire is buried in Dunvegan on the Isle of Skye while Ó Catháin is buried in Sleat, also on Skye, having spent most of his life in the Scottish Highlands. Maybe this is what confused O'Neill.

== Doubts about Ó Catháin's existence ==
In 2017, the Scottish researcher Keith Sanger explained at length his reasons for believing that Ruairí Dall Ó Catháin never existed and was instead made up by Arthur O'Neill. He takes up the most thorough biographical research on Ó Catháin to date, which was first published by Colm Ó Baoill in 1971 and repeated in 2007. Ó Baoill stated that "while Arthur cannot be contradicted on present knowledge, the known history of the Ó Catháin family does not support his account in any way" By 2007, Ó Baoill wrote, "the argument is based on no real evidence, and until some is found we must conclude that the only relic we have of Ruairi Dall Ó Catháin is his music”. Sanger, having revisited the sources for the music (the "Straloch manuscript" of about 1627–1629) states that this has gone missing in 1845. He concludes "But overall the evidence, or rather the lack of any, for a Rorie Dall Ó Cathain does not provide much of a base on which to build his character."

== Bibliography ==
- Edward Bunting: The Ancient Music of Ireland (Dublin: Hodges and Smith, 1840; reprinted Dublin: Walton's, 1969)
- Robert Bruce Armstrong: The Irish and the Highland Harps (Edinburgh: David Douglas, 1904).
- Charlotte Milligan Fox: Annals of the Irish Harpers (London: Smith, Elder & Co., 1911).
- Colm Ó Baoill: "Some Irish Harpers in Scotland", in Transactions of the Gaelic Society of Inverness, vol. 47 (1971–72), pp. 143–171.
- C. Ó Baoill: "Two Irish Harpers in Scotland", in Defining Strains. The Musical Life of Scots in the Seventeenth Century, edited by Michael Porter (Bern etc.: Peter Lang, 2006), pp. 227–244.
- Keith Sanger: "Mapping the Clarsach in Scotland", published 31 May 2017 on wirestrungharp.com
