= Lord Baker =

Lord Baker may refer to:

- John Baker, Baron Baker (1901–1985), British scientist and civil engineer
- Kenneth Baker, Baron Baker of Dorking (born 1934), British politician
- "Lord Baker" (song), a traditional English folk song
