= Spanish Nights =

Spanish Nights may refer to:

== Songs ==
- "Spanish Nights", 1934 piano solo by Oscar Rasbach
- "Spanish Nights", on the 1966 album Shapes of Rhythm by Galt MacDermot
- "Spanish Nights", on the 1974 album I'm Still in Love with You
- "Spanish Nights", on the 1982 album MSB by the Michael Stanley Band
- "Spanish Nights", on the 1999 album Under a Violet Moon by Blackmore's Night
- "Spanish Nights", on the 2002 album Paradise
- "Spanish Nights", on the 2002 album Unicorns by Bill Caddick
- "Spanish Nights", on the 2008 album Tequila Moon by Jessy J
- "Spanish Nights", 2009 work by Joyce Grill

== Other ==
- Spanish Nights (film), a 1931 American Pre-Code drama film
- Spanish Nights, 1994 novel by Jennifer Taylor

== See also ==
- "Spanish Night", song from the 1979 album Heart String by Earl Klugh
- A Night in Spain, 1927 musical revue
