= Bean Pháidin =

Irish folk song

"Bean Pháidín" ('Páidin's Wife') is an Irish folk song, in the Irish language. The song takes the point of view of a jealous and angry woman who yearns to be married to Páidin (Paddy), who already has a wife. The song is known for containing some rather harsh lyrical content as it portrays the hatred that the narrator has toward the other woman. The song started in the sean-nós genre. Joe Heaney was known to have sung the song in a medley. Celtic Woman's version contains partial English lyrics.

== Notable recordings ==
- Planxty – The Well Below the Valley (1973)
- Lasairfhíona Ní Chonaola – An Raicín Álainn (2002)
- Celtic Woman – Destiny (2016)
- Orla Fallon – Lore (2020)
- Jiggy – Translate (2017)
- John Spillane – Irish Songs We Learned at School (2008)
