= So, we'll go no more a roving =

Poem by Lord Byron

So, we'll go no more a roving

So we'll go no more a roving
So late into the night,
Though the heart be still as loving,
And the moon be still as bright.

For the sword outwears its sheath,
And the soul wears out the breast,
And the heart must pause to breathe,
And Love itself have rest.

Though the night was made for loving,
And the day returns too soon,
Yet we'll go no more a roving
By the light of the moon.

"So, we'll go no more a roving" is a poem, written by (George Gordon) Lord Byron (1788–1824), and included in a letter to Thomas Moore on 28 February 1817. Moore published the poem in 1830 as part of Letters and Journals of Lord Byron.

== Background ==
The poem evocatively describes how the youth at that time wanted to do something different. Byron wrote the poem at the age of twenty-nine. In the letter to Thomas Moore, the poem is preceded by an account of its genesis:

At present, I am on the invalid regimen myself. The Carnival—that is, the latter part of it, and sitting up late o' nights—had knocked me up a little. But it is over—and it is now Lent, with all its abstinence and sacred music... Though I did not dissipate much upon the whole, yet I find 'the sword wearing out the scabbard,' though I have just turned the corner of twenty-nine.

The poem was suggested in part by the refrain of a Scottish song known as "The Jolly Beggar". "The Jolly Beggar" was published in Herd's Scottish Songs in 1776, decades before Byron's letter, with this refrain:

And we'll gang nae mair a roving
Sae late into the night,
And we'll gang nae mair a roving, boys,
Let the moon shine ne'er sae bright.
And we'll gang nae mair a roving.

The poem appears as "Go No More A-Roving" on the 2004 Leonard Cohen album Dear Heather. It was also recorded by Joan Baez on her 1964 Joan Baez/5 album, by Mike Westbrook on his 1998 album The Orchestra of Smith's Academy, and by Kris Delmhorst on her 2006 album Strange Conversation. Richard Dyer-Bennet recorded his own setting, with slightly altered text, on the 1955 album Richard Dyer-Bennet 1. The poem also appears on the Marianne Faithfull and Warren Ellis album She Walks in Beauty. The poem is also a centerpiece of "—And the Moon be Still as Bright" from Ray Bradbury's fix-up The Martian Chronicles. A reading of the poem is performed partially as the first verse, and completely as the final verse, in the cover of AC/DC's "For Those About to Rock" by TISM.

The poem serves as a basis for the chorus of the song "The Jolly Beggar" as recorded by the traditional Irish band Planxty, as well as the basis for the love leitmotif in Patrick Doyle's score for the film Mary Shelley's Frankenstein, where it is fully realized in the track "The Wedding Night". The poem is referenced in the epilogue of the novel Fevre Dream by George R. R. Martin. The poem is also featured in John Wyndham's post-apocalyptic novel The Day of the Triffids, where it occurs when a blinded pianist commits suicide.

The first line is a sub-theme to the "Dark Autumn" episode of Midsomer Murders.

== See also ==
- Lachin y Gair
