= Dave Cartwright =

British musician

Dave Cartwright (30 April 1943 – 8 August 2015) was a British singer, songwriter, guitarist and author. Born in Haslemere, Surrey, he grew up in Amblecote, West Midlands where, on lead guitar and vocal, he formed his first rock and roll group, The Crossfires, in 1959. He then joined the Kidderminster outfit The Clippers, before 'discovering' folk music in 1964. His subsequent folk club work and the signing of a deal with Transatlantic Records in 1970 enabled him to turn professional in 1971. He is best known for his 1970s solo albums and TV appearances on BBC daytime show, Pebble Mill at One, and as a former music presenter on BBC Local Radio in the UK Midlands, where he hosted two shows, 'Rock'n'Roll-The Vintage Years' and 'Folkus', an acoustic showcase. Both shows ran for over 13 years. Later in life, he produced and issued his own recordings on his Luna label, from his home studio in Worcestershire, whilst still performing in the UK and Europe.

Cartwright was the co-writer of "A Letter To Syracuse" with Bill Caddick, as recorded by Christy Moore on his album Prosperous. He was also the author of a biography of the late Kidderminster singer-songwriter Clifford T. Ward, entitled Bittersweet. In the year of publication, the book was voted third best biography in Record Collector 's review poll.

He died suddenly and unexpectedly, at his home in Worcestershire on 8 August 2015.

== Discography ==
=== Solo albums ===
- A Little Bit Of Glory (Transatlantic TRA255, 1972) produced by Nathan Joseph
- Back to the Garden (Transatlantic TRA267, 1973) produced by John Worth
- Don't Let Your Family Down (Transatlantic TRA284, 1974) produced by John Whitehead and Dave Cartwright
- Masquerade (DJM DJF20489, 1976) produced by Hugh Murphy
- The Transatlantic Years (Luna 255) compilation from the above TRA albums
- Honesty (Luna 245)
- Strange News (Luna 246)
- Willow Patterns (Luna 247)
- Long Shadows (Luna 249)

=== Other recordings ===
"Dave Cartwright – - – - Number 1" (Highway Records HWY 6001, 1965) EP

==== with Bev Pegg ====
- Bev Pegg (Harmony DB0005, 1969)
- Middle of the Road (Harmony DB0001, 1970) – Vinyl LP, only 99 copies produced, but now available on CD
- Away From The Sand (Harmony DB0006, 1975)

== Books ==
- Bittersweet: The Clifford T Ward Story (Cherry Red Books) ISBN 978-1-901447-18-7
