= Bev Pegg =

British musician

Bev Pegg (born 1941 in Halesowen, England) is an English vocalist, guitarist and comedian, from the Black Country. He lived in Cradley in his early years. He entertains crowds with his humorous anecdotes on his experiences in the Black Country from childhood to the present day, interspersed with related songs. Besides his solo performances, he fronts his “Bev Pegg and his Good Time Jazz Gang” playing classic jazz from the 1920s and 1930s, “Bev Pegg and his Cowboy Band” playing country music, “Bev Pegg and his Railroad Skiffle Group”, and also “Bev Pegg and his Rock ‘n’ Roll Band.”

His musical career started in the late 1950s when he played lead guitar with the Rhythmaires. In the early 1960s, Pegg moved on to the jazz scene playing with pianist Duncan Swift. He was with Ken Rattenbury and his Band during the 1960s and played alongside Bill Rank during 1968. During the late 1960s and early 1970s, Pegg was into the more contemporary folk / rock style that was in vogue at the time. It was in this period at his studio in Kinver, that he recorded songs with Clifford T. Ward, immediately before Clifford was signed to the Dandelion label of which John Peel was a co-owner. He has recorded songs by Dave Cartwright and also John Richards, with whom he co-wrote "Did You Like The Battle Sir?". This song has been recorded by Paul Downes and many other notable folk artists.

Robert Plant has made several impromptu appearances with Pegg's band who shared the bill when Plant launched his “Priory Of Brion” band at Bewdley on 20 November 1999. Pegg has also played alongside Sonny Curtis during two of his UK tours. Pegg is referred to in A Life, the authorised biography of Plant by Paul Rees. There is a reference on page 134 of Pegg's first meeting with Plant. There are picture credits for Pegg, one of Plant with Najma Akthar together with Pegg's wife Sheena at the wedding of Pegg's cousin and also Plant's schoolmate, Rob Brinton. On the following page there is a picture of Plant singing with Bev's Rock 'n' Roll Band at Stourbridge Lawn Tennis and Squash Club in January 2004.

The "Record Collector Rare Record Guide" lists several of Pegg's LPs.

Also a keen sportsman, Pegg won the over 65s Hereford and Worcestershire Tennis single title in 2008, the Hereford and Worcestershire over 60s Racketball title in 2010, and was losing semi-finalist in the UK National over 65s Racketball Championships in 2010. In May 2012, he was the winner of the Men's Over 70s National Racketball Championships. Pegg was unable to defend his title in 2013 due to appearing at The Upton Jazz Festival, however he regained the title once more in 2014.

== Bibliography ==
- Bittersweet: The Clifford T Ward Story (Cherry Red Books), pp. 324, 77-84, 95, 98, 115 ISBN 978-1-901447-18-7
- Brum Rocked On! by Laurie Hornsby, pp. 210 and 229. ISBN 0-9536951-5-8
- Robert Plant. A Life the authorised biography by Paul Rees, p. 134 plus various photographs credited to Pegg ISBN 978-0-00-751487-8
