= The Jolly Beggar =

Traditional song

The Jolly Beggar (Roud 118, Child 279), also known as The Gaberlunzieman, Gaberlunzie King, The Ragged Beggarman or simply The Beggar Man, is a traditional Scottish folk ballad. The song's chorus inspired lines in Lord Byron's poem "So, we'll go no more a roving".

== Synopsis ==
A beggar comes over the hills one day, and knocks on the door of a local farmer and asks for a roof for the night. He will not accept a bed in the barn, but wishes only to sleep by the kitchen fire. Late at night, the farmer's daughter comes down to lock the kitchen door. The beggar and daughter exchange words, and fall in love. They sleep together, and through some unmentioned premise, the daughter accuses the man of being a nobleman come dressed as a beggar to woo her. He convinces her that he is indeed only a beggar, and she kicks him out. It is revealed, however, that he was indeed a nobleman.

Hamish Henderson and Ewan McVicar have noted:

Another native Scots ballad. It is sometimes said to reflect one of the adventures of King James V of Scotland, who traveled the country disguised as the Guidman of Ballengeich to learn how his subjects fared. Some versions include a violent seduction verse sounding akin to rape. This ballad is intensely popular, and many Scots traditional singers have recorded it.

== Recorded versions ==
- Ewan MacColl recorded the song for the 1956 anthology album The English and Scottish Popular Ballads, Volume 1.
- The Ian Campbell Folk Group recorded it for their 1962 album Ceilidh at the Crown.
- Cyril Tawney recorded the ballad twice, once for his 1969 album The Outlandish Knight and once for his 1976 album Down Among the Barley Straw.
- Planxty recorded a version of the song on their eponymous 1973 album as "The Jolly Beggar".
- The Corries recorded a version of this song (a condensed version of Child's second version) on their album Bonnet, Belt and Sword. However, somewhat confusingly, they recorded it under the title "Gaberlunzie King", and this album includes a completely different song recorded under the title "The Jolly Beggar".

== See also ==
- List of the Child Ballads
- The Beggar-Laddie
