= Máire Ní Chathasaigh =

Irish harpist and singer (born 1956)

- Born: Bandon
- Occupations: Singer, harpist, teacher
- Awards: Gradam Ceoil TG4 (2001); Fleadh Cheoil (1975, 1976, 1977)
- Website: www.maireandchris.com

External videos
- “Máire Ní Chathasaigh & Chris Newman playing 'Molly St. George'”, Harp Ireland, Dec 27, 2021.

Máire Ní Chathasaigh (Irish pronunciation: [ˈmˠaːɾʲə n̠ʲiː ˈxahəsˠiː]; born 1956) is an Irish harpist, composer and singer. Her stylistic innovations made her famous. She has won All-Ireland (Fleadh Cheoil na hÉireann) harp competitions, the Senior All-Ireland competition, and Pan-Celtic Harp Competitions at both junior and senior levels. Her 1985 album The New-Strung Harp has been credited with redefining what the instrument could do. In 2001 she was the recipient of the Gradam Ceoil TG4 for Traditional Musician of the Year. In Live Ireland 2016 she was named Female Musician of the Year.

== Biography ==
Máire Ní Chathasaigh was born in Bandon, County Cork, Ireland and grew up in Ballinascarty and Bandon. Her family includes multiple generations of musicians, among them her mother Úna Casey and sisters Nollaig and Mairéad. Máire began learning to play the harp by ear at age eleven. She later learned to read and play written music. She created new harp ornamentation techniques to make the harp's stylistically accurate performance possible. She did not take classical harp lessons until much later, in her twenties, when Denise Kelly began to teach pedal harp at the Cork School of Music. Ní Chathasaigh then began to combine classical harp techniques with her own innovations on traditional forms. Her stylistic innovations made her famous in the Celtic music scene.

Having won All-Ireland (Fleadh Cheoil na hÉireann) harp competitions at under-fourteen and under-eighteen levels, she then, in the mid-1970s, won the Senior All-Ireland competition three years in succession. She also won the Pan-Celtic Harp Competition at junior and senior levels.

Ní Chathasaigh earned an honours degree in Celtic Studies from University College Cork, and a diploma in education. After three years, she gave up a secure job teaching Irish in a secondary school, Scoil Mhuire in Cork city, to become a professional musician. She later taught at the Cork Municipal School of Music (where she created the first non-pedal harp exam syllabus) and at the Leeds College of Music, where her students included the Scottish harpist Corrina Hewat.

Camac Harp, France, belonging to Máire Ní Chathasaigh

In 1985 Ní Chathasaigh recorded The New-Strung Harp, the first harp album to concentrate primarily on traditional Irish dance music. This album has been credited with redefining what the instrument could do, expanding the harp’s role beyond the constraints of its accepted repertoire and style. The New-Strung Harp was remastered and reissued in 2023.

Ní Chathasaigh began playing as a duo with English guitarist Chris Newman in 1987, on the main stage at the 1987 Cambridge Folk Festival. Touring as a duo they have performed in at least twenty-four countries on five continents, including Europe, North America, Australasia and Japan.

In 1988 Ní Chathasaigh and Newman recorded The Living Wood, their first duo album, and possibly the first harp/guitar duo album recorded. Since then they have recorded at least six further duo albums. In 2008, Ní Chathasaigh and Newman recorded a quartet album, Heartstring Sessions, with Máire's sister Nollaig Casey and Nollaig's husband Arty McGlynn. The four toured internationally as the Heartstring Quartet. In 2016 Máire Ní Chathasaigh released a trio album, Sibling Revelry, with her sisters Nollaig Casey and Mairéad Ní Chathasaigh. The album includes harp, vocals, fiddles, and tin whistle. Songlines reviewer Michael Quinn applauded both Máire's harp playing and her voice, which was described as "blissfully beautiful".

Ní Chathasaigh gives masterclasses worldwide to share her techniques. She began teaching in the 1970s. She taught harp when it was first included as an instrument in the Scoil Éigse, held before Fleadh Cheoil na h-Éireann, in 1976. She has published two books of arrangements, The Irish Harper Vols. I and II. Volume I, which was published in 1991 by Old Bridge Music, is considered an authoritative work. Volume II was first released by Old Bridge Music in 2001. A second updated edition of Volume Two was published on 25 July 2022.

She was the 2001 recipient of TG4 Gradam Ceoil Ceoltóir na Bliana / Musician of the Year, awarded "for the excellence and pioneering force of her music, the remarkable growth she has brought to the music of the harp and for the positive influence she has had on the young generation of harpers". In Live Ireland 2016 she was named Female Musician of the Year.

She features on the cover of the first edition of the book Bringing it all back home: The influence of Irish music (1991) by Nuala O'Connor and the June–July 2017 issue of Germany's Folk Magazin and of Comhaltas Ceoltóirí Éireann's magazine, Treoir. She and Chris Newman were featured on the cover, and in an article within, the April / May 2021 issue of The Living Tradition magazine. She is profiled in Celtic Women in Music by Mairéad Sullivan, The Rough Guide To Irish Folk, and a number of magazine and newspaper articles.

A TV documentary programme about Ní Chathasaigh and her sister Nollaig (also featuring their sister Mairéad, together with Chris Newman and Nollaig's late husband Arty McGlynn) was originally broadcast on TG4 on November 29, 2020.

== Albums ==
- The New Strung Harp (Temple Records, 1985)
- The Living Wood (first released by Green Linnet, 1988; reissued by Black Crow 1989; re-mastered and reissued by Old Bridge Music 1995, OBMCD07) - with guitarist Chris Newman
- Out Of Court (Old Bridge Music OBMCD03, 1991) - with guitarist Chris Newman
- The Carolan Albums (Old Bridge Music OBMCD06,1991) - with guitarist Chris Newman
- Live In The Highlands (Old Bridge Music OBMCD08,1995) - with guitarist Chris Newman
- Dialogues / Agallaimh (Old Bridge Music OBMCD014, 2001) - with guitarist Chris Newman
- Firewire (Old Bridge Music OBMCD017, 2007) - with guitarist Chris Newman
- Heartstring Sessions (Old Bridge Music OBMCD018, 2008) - with guitarist Chris Newman, fiddler / singer Nollaig Casey and guitarist Arty McGlynn
- Christmas Lights (Old Bridge Music OBMCD20, 2013) - with guitarist Chris Newman
- Sibling Revelry (Old Bridge Music OBMCD22, 2015) - with her sisters, fiddler / composer / singer Nollaig Casey and fiddler / singer Mairéad Ní Chathasaigh (The Casey Sisters)

== Books ==
- The Irish Harper (Vol. 1 and Vol. 2)
