= Chris Newman (British musician) =

British guitarist and mandolinist (b.1952)

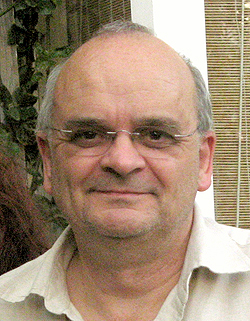
- Born: 30 October 1952 (age 73); Stevenage, Hertfordshire, England
- Occupations: Acoustic guitarist and mandolinist
- Known for: The Chris Newman Trio

Chris Newman (born 30 October 1952) is a British acoustic guitarist and mandolinist, noted for his work as a soloist, as the partner of the Irish harper Máire Ní Chathasaigh, as a member of the Irish-English band, Heartstring Sessions, and with his own band, The Chris Newman Trio.

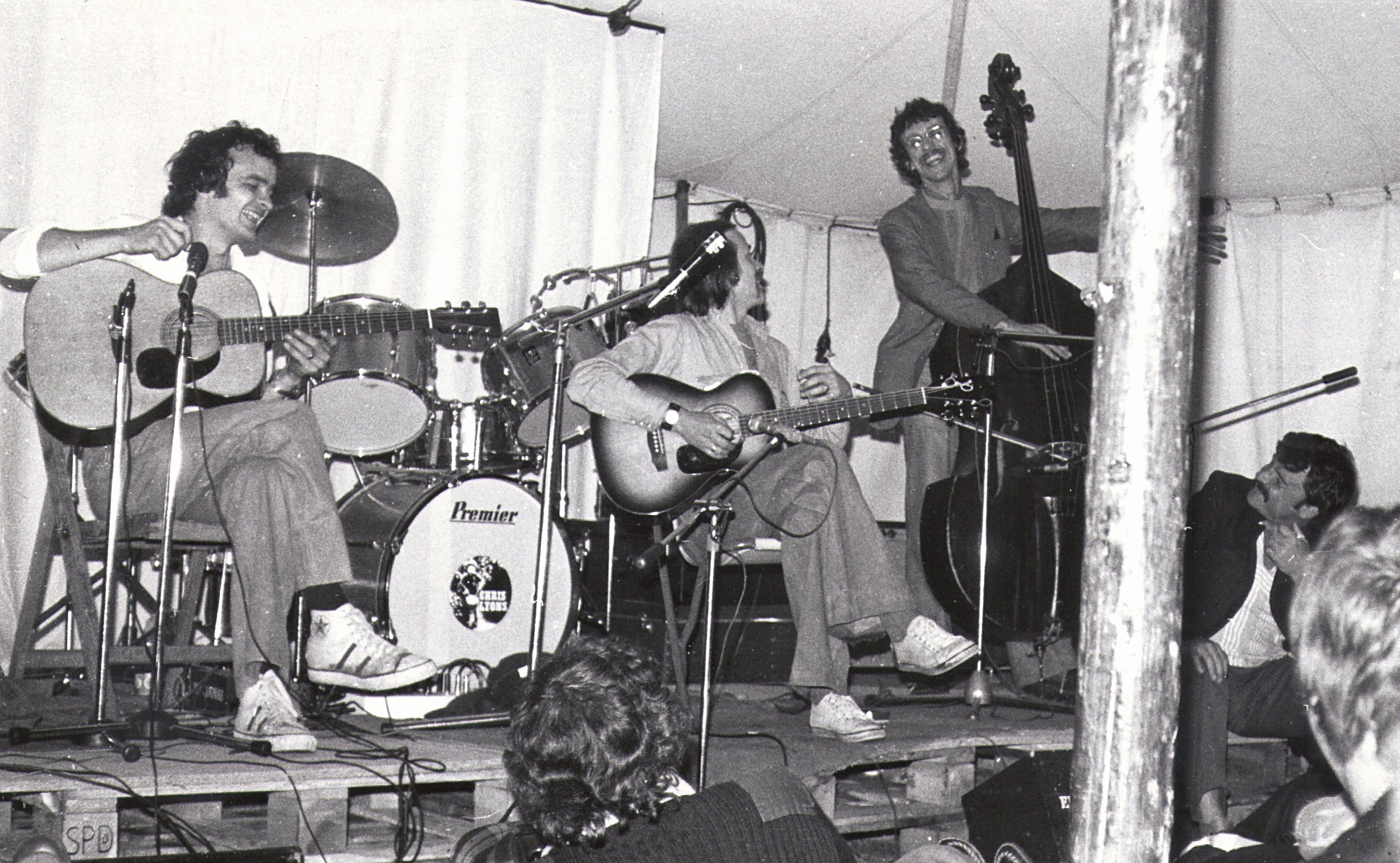
Newman (left) performs with his group at the 1977 Cambridge Folk Festival, U.K., while Diz Disley (extreme right) watches on. Musicians L-R: Chris Newman, guitar; Mike Ring, guitar; Henry Davies, double bass.

== Life and career ==
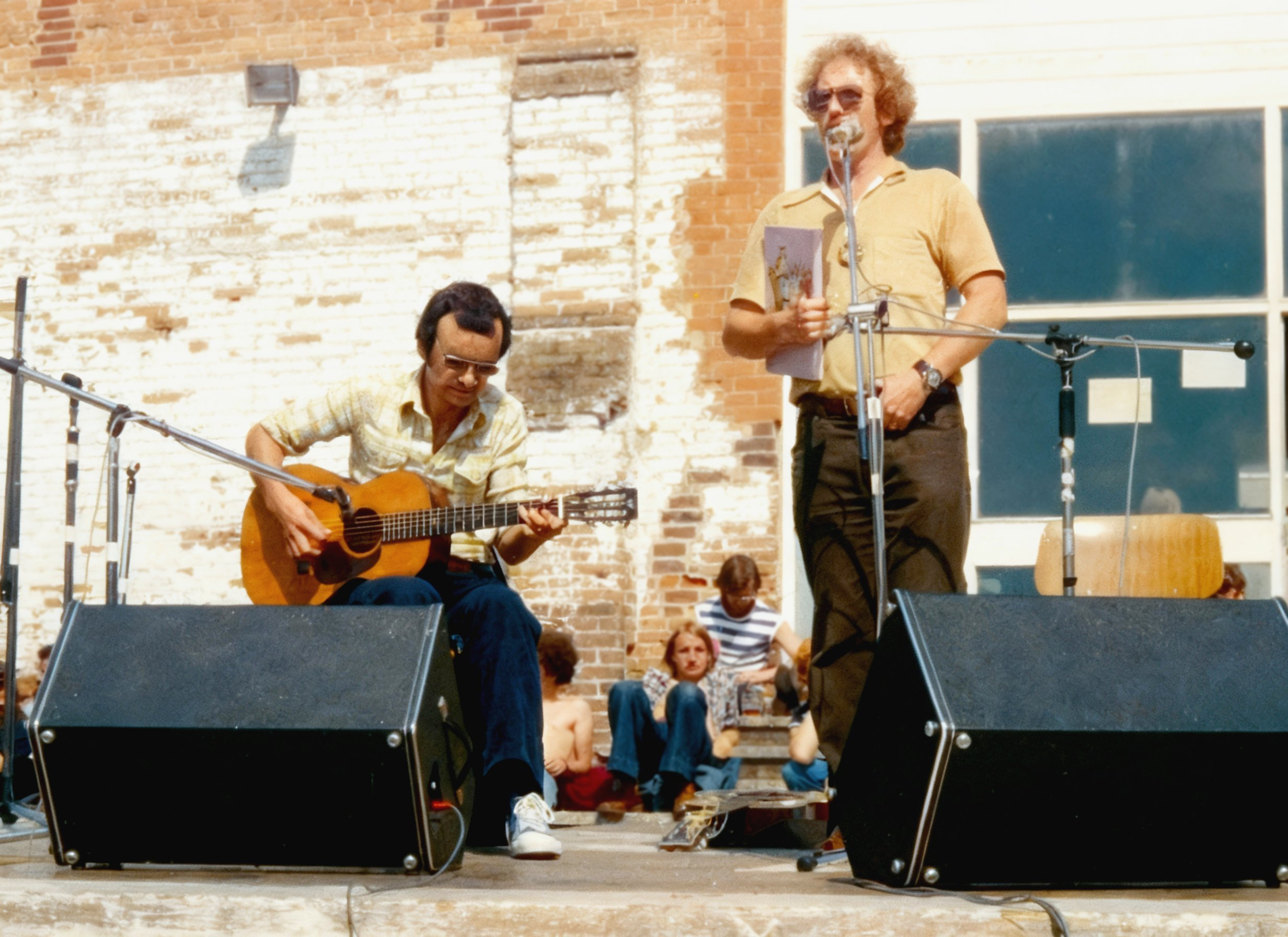
Newman (on guitar) in 1978, accompanying the humorous performer Fred Wedlock

He was born in Stevenage, Hertfordshire, England. He began playing guitar at the age of four and, in his teenage years, was mentored by the jazz guitarist Diz Disley. In the 1970s and 1980s, he worked as musical director and record producer for the singers Fred Wedlock and Brenda Wootton, at the same time establishing his identity as a soloist with the 1981 album, Chris Newman. He has subsequently worked with the Scottish-Irish Celtic music band, The Boys of the Lough. He has been principal guitar tutor for Newcastle University’s Folk B.Mus course since its inception, and regularly teaches at residential courses worldwide. He continues production work and has produced albums for many noted artists in the sphere of traditional and acoustic music, including Irish fiddler Nollaig Casey and acoustic guitarist Clive Carroll.

== Albums ==
- Chris Newman (1981) - solo
- Chris Newman Two (1983) - solo
- Fretwork (1998) - solo
- Still Getting Away With It (2011) - solo
- The Living Wood (1988) - with harper Máire Ní Chathasaigh
- Out Of Court (1991) - with harper Máire Ní Chathasaigh
- The Carolan Albums (1991) - with harper Máire Ní Chathasaigh
- Live In The Highlands (1995) - with harper Máire Ní Chathasaigh
- Dialogues (2001) - with harper Máire Ní Chathasaigh
- Firewire (2006) - with harper Máire Ní Chathasaigh
- Christmas Lights (2013) - with harper Máire Ní Chathasaigh
- Breaking Bach (flat picking the partitas) (2021) - solo

== Books ==
- Adventure With A Flatpick (2001)
