= Unicorns (album) =

Studio album by Bill Caddick
- Released: 2002
- Genre: Folk
- Label: Working Joe
- Producer: Mick Dolan

Professional ratings
Review scores
Source	Rating
Living Tradition	

Unicorns is a folk album by Bill Caddick recorded and released in 2002.

Recorded and produced by Mick Dolan. Issued by Working Joe Music in the UK, catalogue number WJM2003.

These are 2002 rerecordings of Caddick's "greatest hits" (the original albums being unavailable) plus a few previously unrecorded songs.

== Track listing ==
All written by Bill Caddick except where noted.

=== Disc 1 ===
1. Donkey Jack
2. Waiting For The Lark
3. Oller Boller
4. Winter Fair
5. Poor Pig
6. Narrow Lock Gates
7. King Sun
8. Unicorns
9. John O'Dreams
10. Jack Pudding
11. One Hand On The Radio (Bond/Caddick)
12. Born A Dog
13. Rainbow Waistcoat
14. Letter To Syracuse (Caddick/Cartwright)
15. Sunny Memories
16. Gibson Girl
17. The Reaper
18. The Writing Of Tipperary

=== Disc 2 ===
1. Eights And Aces
2. Wild West Show
3. Two-Fisted Heroes
4. The Day They Busted Superman
5. Spanish Nights
6. A Dance To The Music Of Time
7. Stay On The Line
8. Chaconne
9. Won't Say When
10. Lili Marlene Walks Away
11. The Barmaid's Song (She Moves Among Men)
12. Down In The South
13. Can't Blame A Man
14. Reach For Jesus
15. Flat Earth
16. Aqaba
17. Quixote (The Old Man's Song) (Caddick/Tams)
18. The Last Damn Song

== Personnel ==
- Bill Caddick - guitar, vocals
