= Cold Blow and the Rainy Night =

Studio album by Planxty
- Released: 1974
- Recorded: August 1974
- Studio: Sarm Studios, Whitechapel, London
- Genre: Irish folk music
- Length: 45:44
- Label: Polydor Records, Shanachie Records
- Producer: Phil Coulter

Planxty chronology
The Well Below the Valley (1973)	Cold Blow and the Rainy Night (1974)	After The Break (1979)

Professional ratings
Review scores
Source	Rating
Allmusic	4.5/5 stars

Cold Blow and the Rainy Night is the third album by the Irish folk group Planxty. It was recorded in Sarm Studios, Whitechapel, London during August 1974 and released the same year. It takes its title from the third song on the album, "Cold Blow and the Rainy Night".

== Track listing ==
All titles are Traditional, arranged by Planxty, except where indicated.

1. "Johnny Cope" (song & hornpipe) – 5:16
2. "Dennis Murphy's Polka"/"The 42-Pound Cheque"/"John Ryan's Polka" (polkas) – 3:07
3. "Cold Blow And The Rainy Night" (song) – 2:40
4. "'P' Stands For Paddy, I Suppose" (song) – 4:36
5. "The Old Torn Petticoat"/"The Dublin Reel"/"The Wind That Shakes The Barley" (reels) – 3:46
6. "Băneasă's Green Glade"/"Mominsko Horo" (song/Balkan dance) – 5:48
  (Andy Irvine)/(Trad., Arr. Irvine-Lunny)
7. "The Little Drummer" (song) – 3:16
8. "The Lakes Of Pontchartrain" (song) – 5:48
9. "The Hare In The Corn"/"The Frost Is All Over"/"The Gander In The Pratie Hole" (jigs) – 4:22
10. "The Green Fields Of Canada" (song) – 6:55

For a detailed analysis of this album's contents see the Irishtune.info album page.

== Personnel ==
- Christy Moore - vocals, guitar, bodhrán, harmonium
- Andy Irvine - vocals, mandolin, mandola, hurdy-gurdy, dulcimer
- Dónal Lunny - guitar, bouzouki, portative organ, bodhrán
- Johnny Moynihan - vocals, bouzouki, fiddle, tin whistle
- Liam O'Flynn - uilleann pipes, tin whistle
