= Sí Bheag, Sí Mhór =

Irish traditional song

Sí Bheag, Sí Mhór (traditional feminine form, the alternative masculine form being "Sí Beag, Sí Mór"), anglicized as Sheebeg, Sheemore, is a traditional Irish folk tune. The title uses the word sí, the Irish for 'fairy mound'.

== Origins ==
The tune is usually attributed to blind harpist and singer Turlough O'Carolan (1670–1738) as his first song, written to the tune of "The Bonnie Cuckoo" (Roud 24351).

One author describes it as a "beautiful old Irish air, usually played simply and leisurely, and occasionally played as a waltz". Sí Mór (Sheemore) and Sí Beag (Sheebeg) are the names given to two small hills, situated close to each other in south County Leitrim, said to be ancient burial sites, and to a site in Carolan's birth county of Meath.

== Recordings ==
In modern times the tune has been recorded by many artists, first by Planxty on their 1973 debut album Planxty and by The Boys of the Lough on their 1973 debut album The Boys of the Lough, then by The Chieftains on their 1975 album The Chieftains 5, as part of "The Humours of Carolan" suite. It has been performed live on numerous occasions by Fairport Convention, who also recorded it for the B-side of their 1987 single release of "Meet on the Ledge". It is commonly played on the fiddle – Fairport Convention's fiddler Dave Swarbrick showcased the tune in his touring partnership with Simon Nicol – and is also a favourite of various fingerstyle guitarists, including Tony McManus, Joseph Chester and Pierre Bensusan. The Galician folk band Milladoiro recorded a version of this song in their 1980 debut album A Galicia de Maeloc.
