= Cold Blow and the Rainy Night (song) =

English folk song

"Cold Blow And The Rainy Night"

Song
- Genre: English folk song

"Cold Blow and a Rainy Night" (also known as "Cold Haily Windy Night", Let Me In This Ae Nicht", or "The Laird o’ Windy Wa's") is an English folk song which has been recorded by numerous musicians and musical groups, including James Bowie (Blind Jimmie), Jeannie Robertson, Steeleye Span, Martin Carthy, Planxty, and the Exiles.

It is a typical "night-visiting song".

The song has been documented through EFDSS and Mainly Norfolk. The song has been recorded by Jon Boden and Oli Steadman for inclusion in their respective lists of daily folk songs "A Folk Song a Day" and "365 Days of Folk".
