= Bill Caddick =

English folk singer-songwriter and guitarist (1944–2018)

- Born: Lewis Frederick William Caddick; 27 June 1944; Hurst Hill, Wolverhampton, England
- Died: 19 November 2018 (aged 74)
- Occupations: Singer-songwriter, guitarist
- Formerly of: Home Service

Lewis Frederick William Caddick (27 June 1944 – 19 November 2018) was an English folk singer-songwriter and guitarist, particularly noted for his songwriting and as a member of the innovative and influential group Home Service.

== Career outline ==
He was born in Hurst Hill, Wolverhampton, England. Singing since the 1960s in folk clubs and festivals, in 1973 Caddick joined the street theatre group Magic Lantern, formed by Taffy Thomas and described by Mel McClellan on the BBC website as "legendary". He left Magic Lantern in 1975 to concentrate on his solo career, becoming well known as a festival artist in Britain and overseas. In 1977, he joined the Albion Band in the National Theatre productions of Lark Rise and The Passion. Caddick later collaborated with Tim Laycock and Peter Bond in a stage show and album about circus life, called A Duck on his Head. About this time, he wrote songs for radio and TV, and performed his own songs in a film about the Tolpuddle Martyrs. From 1980 to 1985, Caddick was a member of the renowned folk-rock band Home Service. He continued to write and perform at clubs and festivals, albeit in a more low-key way than before, as well as continuing his involvement with the National Theatre, writing and appearing in several plays which included Don Quixote, and The Mysteries (an award-winning trilogy performed in the West End, on TV and throughout Europe, as well as at the National).

In later life Caddick ran a folk club in his home village of Jackfield, Shropshire and, as well as his solo career, was a member of three groups: local band the Jackfield Riverbillies, ceilidh band All Blacked Up and as part of the Anne Lennox Martin Band.

His songs, such as "John O'Dreams", "Unicorns", "Oh to Be a King", and "She Moves Among Men", have been recorded by numerous other musicians including June Tabor, Faustus, Chris Foster, Alex Campbell, Christy Moore, Priscilla Herdman, Dan Evans, Peter Rowan, John Kirkpatrick, Artisan, Coope Boyes and Simpson and The Yetties.

== Personal life and death ==
Caddick's marriage, to June Powell, ended in divorce. He married his second wife, illustrator Katherine Soutar, in 1996. After briefly living in London, he settled in Jackfield with Katherine.

He died on 19 November 2018, aged 74. He is survived by his wife Katherine their son, Tam, and by Christy, his son from his first marriage.

== Discography ==
=== Solo recordings ===
- Rough Music (1976)
- Sunny Memories (1977)
- Reasons Briefly Set Down (1979)
- Wild West Show (1986)
- Urban Legend (1991)
- Winter With Flowers (1995)
- Unicorns (2002)

In 2009 Two-Fisted Heroes from Wild West Show was included in Topic Records 70-year anniversary boxed set Three Score and Ten as track seventeen on the fifth CD.

=== Group recordings ===
- (With The Albion Band) Lark Rise To Candleford (1979)
- (With Bond, Caddick & Laycock) A Duck On His Head (1980)
- (With Home Service) Doing The Inglish (1981)
- (With Home Service) Home Service (1984)
- (With Home Service) The Mysteries (1984)
- (With Home Service) The Mysteries EP (1985)
- (With Home Service) Wild Life (1995)
- (With Home Service) Early Transmissions (1996)
- (With The Jackfield Riverbillies) Cherokee (1999)

=== As session musician ===
- John Kirkpatrick – Going Spare (1978)
- Richard and Linda Thompson – First Light (1978)
- Peter Bond – See Me Up, See Me Down (1979)
- Tim Laycock – Capers & Rhymes
- Various Artists – All Through The Year
- Ashley Hutchings – The Guv'nor Vol 2 (1997)
- Jan Davies – Magpies
- Les Barker – Tubular Dogs
- Various Artists – Festival
- Anne Lennox-Martin – Born to the Breed (2004)
