= Vicar Street =

Venue in Dublin, Ireland

Coordinates: 53.342667°N 6.277815°W

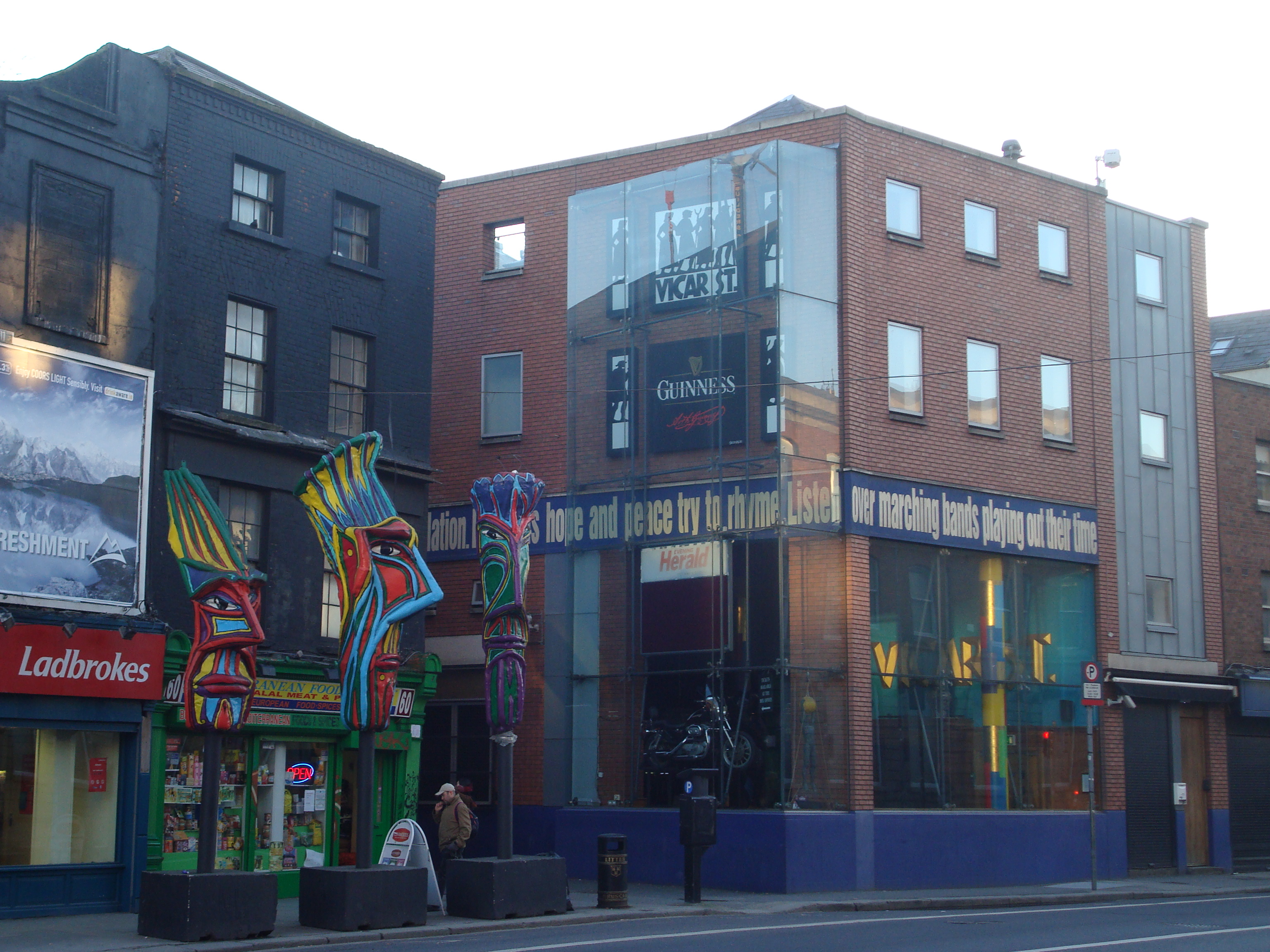
- Vicar Street exterior in 2010
- Interactive map of Vicar Street
- Address: 58 Thomas Street, Dublin, Ireland
- Owner: Harry Crosbie
- Seating type: Seated, standing
- Capacity: 1,050 (seated); 1,500 (standing)
- Type: Concert hall Performing arts centre

Construction
- Built: 1997–1998
- Opened: September 1998
- Expanded: 2002

Website
- vicarstreet.ie

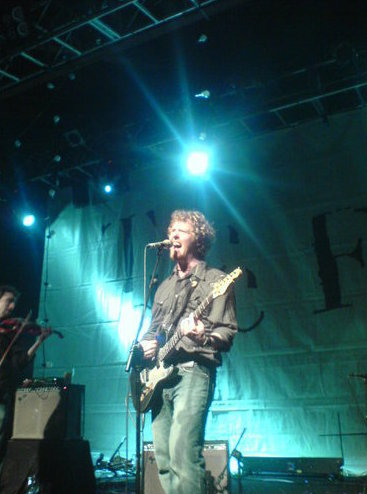
Glen Hansard live at Vicar Street, December 2006

Vicar Street is a concert, performing arts centre and events venue in Dublin, Ireland. Located at Thomas Street, Dublin 8, Vicar Street has a capacity of 1,050 people for seated performances and 1,500 people for standing gigs. The venue is owned by Harry Crosbie and operated by Peter Aiken. Since opening in 1998, the venue has become a popular setting for a wide range of acts like stand-up comedy, drama performances, and a variety of concerts. The first artist to play on the Vicar Street Stage was local singer/songwriter Shay Cotter. Major international recording artists have performed in Vicar Street including Bob Dylan in 2000, Neil Young in 2003, Adele in 2008, Paul Simon and Ed Sheeran in 2011, Lana Del Rey in 2013, and The Wailers in 2025.

Because of its intimate size, the venue is looked on with warmth by fans and acts alike.

== Notable events ==
=== Longest-running solo show ===
The longest-running show to take place in Vicar Street was Tommy Tiernan's Loose show with a string of 166 performances.

=== Other events ===
Vicar Street hosts the Choice Music Prize ceremony in February/March each year. Occasionally, the venue is used to accommodate higher attendances than expected at smaller venues. In 2008, Canadian indie rock band Wolf Parade's November show which had been scheduled for Andrew's Lane Theatre was moved to Vicar Street. Bob Dylan performed at the venue in 2000 for his first, and as yet, only gig at the venue.Lankum have played here many times with the nights known for their debauchery, general mayhem and off-kilter vibes.

Gary Numan played his first concert in Ireland here in 2001. Planxty played a series of concerts at the venue on 30 & 31 January and on 4 & 5, 11 & 12 February 2004, which were recorded and from which selected material was released on the CD Live 2004 and its associated DVD.

Bell X1 played two shows in November 2008 to celebrate the venue's tenth anniversary. In March 2009, the Irish Anti-War Movement hosted a fund-raising event at Vicar Street, featuring Christy Moore, Stephen Rea, Sinéad Cussack, Róisín Elsafy, Mick Pyro, Judith Mok, and Joyce. A Musicians For Marriage Equality show featuring artists such as Michele Ann Kelly and The Spikes took place at Vicar Street in October 2009.

Rap superstar Kendrick Lamar played his first concert in Ireland in Vicar Street in 2013. "Weird Al" Yankovic played his first concert in Ireland here on 26 October 2015, during the Mandatory World Tour.

== Live recordings ==
Many comedians and musicians, both from Ireland and abroad, have chosen to record some of their live material at the venue including Simon Amstell, Aslan, Des Bishop, Jason Byrne, Damien Dempsey, The Dubliners, Erasure, The Frames, Andy Irvine's 70th birthday concerts, Kíla, Christy Moore, Dylan Moran, Moving Hearts, Mundy, Planxty, Josh Ritter, Tommy Tiernan, Neil Young, Dara Ó Briain, and Foil, Arms & Hog.

== Awards ==
Vicar Street has been awarded the Live Music Venue of the Year Award, in the national and Dublin-based categories of the IMRO awards, for two years running in 2009 and 2008–the first two years of the IMRO Music Venue Awards. Additionally in 2008, it also received the Hot Press Readers Award for Best Live Music Venue in Ireland.
