= Nollaig Casey =

Irish fiddle player

Nollaig Casey (Irish: Nollaig Ní Chathasaigh) is an Irish fiddle player, and has an international reputation as one of Ireland's finest fiddle players. By the time she was eleven years old she could play violin, piano, tin whistle and uilleann pipes. During her teenage years she learned to play in both the classical and traditional musical traditions. She won several All-Ireland titles for fiddle and traditional singing culminating in an award for her in 1972 for the best all-round performer.

== Life ==
She graduated from University College Cork with a B.Mus. degree at the age of nineteen, and started her career with the RTÉ National Symphony Orchestra where she remained for five years. She began performing live with the band Planxty in 1980, touring with them throughout Europe and appearing on their final album, 1983's Words & Music. Casey has also recorded and toured with Moving Hearts, Liam O'Flynn, Frances Black, The Clancy Brothers and Elvis Costello.

Her television appearances include the BBC TV series Bringing It All Back Home and A River of Sound. She has also performed as a featured artist in Dónal Lunny's Coolfin band with whom she has recorded and toured extensively. More recently she has performed as a soloist with the phenomenally successful Riverdance as well as featuring in Shaun Davey's Granuaile and May We Never Have To Say Goodbye which was the theme song of the 2003 Special Olympic World Games which were hosted by Ireland.

She also performed frequently with her husband guitarist Arty McGlynn, and performed with her sister harpist Máire Ní Chathasaigh and guitarist Chris Newman.
