= Words & Music (Planxty album) =

Words and Music

Studio album by Planxty
- Released: 1983
- Recorded: Late October - early November 1982
- Studio: Windmill Lane Studios, Dublin
- Genre: Irish folk music
- Length: 39:42
- Label: WEA, Shanachie Records
- Producer: Dónal Lunny

Planxty chronology
The Woman I Loved So Well (1980)	Words and Music (1983)	Live 2004 (2004)

Alternative cover
- Words & Music German cover, photo of Poulnabrone dolmen

Words & Music is the sixth album by the Irish folk band Planxty, produced by Dónal Lunny and recorded at Windmill Lane Studios in late October and early November of 1982; it would be their only release on the WEA label. In 1989, the album was reprinted by the Shanachie label, who have kept it in print ever since.

== Expanded line-up ==
Like the previous album, The Woman I Loved So Well, Words & Music features an expanded line-up of the band. Core band members Christy Moore, Dónal Lunny, Andy Irvine and Liam O'Flynn were joined again by keyboard player Bill Whelan, now a member of the band, and fiddler Nollaig Casey, who had been performing live with the band since 1980. Fiddler James Kelly and Moving Hearts bass player Eoghan O'Neill also appear on the album.

== Track listing ==
1. "Queen of the Rushes"/"Paddy Fahy's" (jigs) – 3:25
  (Traditional; arranged by Planxty)
2. "Thousands Are Sailing" (song) – 5:18
  (Words: Traditional; music: Andy Irvine, Dónal Lunny)
3. "Táimse Im' Chodladh" (slow air) – 4:07
  (Traditional; arranged by Planxty)
4. "Lord Baker" (song) – 9:16
  (From John Reilly, with new words and music from Christy Moore)
5. "Accidentals"/"Aragon Mill" (instrumental/song) – 6:02
  (Andy Irvine)/(Si Kahn)
6. "Aconry Lasses"/"The Old Wheels Of The World"/"The Spike Island Lasses" (reels) – 3:32
  (Traditional; arranged by Planxty)
7. "I Pity the Poor Immigrant" (song) – 4:25
  (Bob Dylan)
8. "Irish Marche" (Irish clan march) – 3:37
  (William Byrd, arranged by Liam O'Flynn, Dónal Lunny, Bill Whelan)

For a detailed analysis of this album's contents see the Irishtune.info album page.

== Personnel ==
- Christy Moore - vocals, guitar, bodhrán
- Andy Irvine - vocals, mandolin, bouzouki, harmonica
- Dónal Lunny - guitar, bouzouki, spinnet, dulcimer, bowed psaltery, Prophet synthesizer
- Liam O'Flynn - uilleann pipes, tin whistle
- Bill Whelan - keyboards
- Nollaig Casey - fiddle
- James Kelly - fiddle
- Eoghan O'Neill - electric bass
