= After the Break =

After The Break

Studio album by Planxty
- Released: 1979
- Recorded: 18–30 June 1979
- Studio: Windmill Lane Studios, Dublin
- Genre: Irish folk music
- Length: 47:57
- Label: Tara Music, Shanachie Records
- Producer: Dónal Lunny

Planxty chronology
Cold Blow and the Rainy Night (1974)	After The Break (1979)	The Woman I Loved So Well (1980)

After The Break is the fourth studio album by the Irish folk music band Planxty, recorded at Windmill Lane Studios from 18 to 30 June 1979 and released the same year. It was the band's first of two releases on Tara Records.

As its title suggests, this was the first album released after the group's initial split in 1975 (although Dónal Lunny and Christy Moore had resigned, separately, earlier). The album was produced by Lunny and engineered by Brian Masterson, who had worked with the band since their earliest shows. It is the first of two albums to feature future Chieftains member Matt Molloy on flute, who had earlier been playing with Lunny in The Bothy Band.

Two other pieces recorded at the time, "Lord McDonald/The Chattering Magpie" (a set of reels) and "The Bonny Light Horseman" (a song by Andy Irvine) were not included on the LP, but were later released on the Tara Records compilation High Kings of Tara, in 1980. However, these two recordings were subsequently added to the CD and digital versions of After The Break.

The album closes with the Bulgarian dance tune "Smeceno Horo" brought to the group by Irvine, who has called it "the closest I ever got to melding two traditions together".

== Track listing ==
All titles credited to Christy Moore, Dónal Lunny, Andy Irvine, Matt Molloy and Liam O'Flynn. Published by Mild Music.

=== Original LP Version ===
Side A

1. "The Good Ship Kangaroo" (song) – 4:33
2. "East At Glendart/Brian O'Lynn/Pay The Reckoning" (double jigs) – 3:43
3. "You Rambling Boys Of Pleasure" (song) – 7:48
4. "The Lady On The Island/The Gatehouse Maid/The Virginia/Callaghan's" (reels) – 3:11

Side B

1. "The Rambling Siúler" (song) – 4:19
2. "The Blackberry Blossom/Lucky In Love/The Dairy Maid" (reels) – 4:58
3. "The Pursuit Of Farmer Michael Hayes" (song) – 6:10
4. "Smeceno Horo" (Bulgarian dance) – 4:32

=== CD and Digital Release ===
1. "The Good Ship Kangaroo" (song) – 4:33
2. "Double Jigs: East at Glendart / Brian O' Flynn / Pay the Reckoning" (double jigs) – 3:43
3. "You Rambling Boys of Pleasure" (song) – 7:48
4. "Reels: The Blackberry Blossom / Lucky in Love / The Dairy Maid" (reels) – 3:11
5. "The Rambling Siúler" (song) – 4:19
6. "The Lady On The Island / The Gatehouse Maid / The Virginia / Callaghan's" (reels) – 4:58
7. "The Pursuit of Farmer Michael Hayes" (song) – 6:10
8. "Lord McDonald / The Chattering Magpie" (reels) – 4:12
9. "The Bonny Light Horseman" (song) – 4:31
10. "Smeceno Horo" (Bulgarian dance) – 4:32

For a detailed analysis of this album's contents see the Irishtune.info album page.

== Personnel ==
- Christy Moore – vocals, guitar, harmonium & bodhrán.
- Andy Irvine – vocals, mandolin, mandola, hurdy-gurdy & bouzouki.
- Dónal Lunny – blarge & guitar.
- Liam O'Flynn – uilleann pipes & tin whistle.
- Matt Molloy – flute & tin whistle.
