= The Woman I Loved So Well =

Studio album by Planxty
- Released: 1980
- Recorded: April–May 1980
- Studio: Windmill Lane Studios, Dublin
- Genre: Irish folk music
- Length: 44:51
- Label: Tara
- Producer: Dónal Lunny, Brian Masterson

Planxty chronology
After The Break (1979)	The Woman I Loved So Well (1980)	Words & Music (1983)

Professional ratings
Review scores
Source	Rating
Allmusic	3/5 stars

The Woman I Loved So Well is the fifth studio album by Planxty. Like their previous album, After The Break, the album was recorded at Windmill Lane Studios and released by Tara Records. Co-produced by band member Dónal Lunny and engineer Brian Masterson, the album was recorded in April and May of 1980 and released on LP in July of that year. It remains in print on CD and in digital form from Tara to date.

Like their sixth album—Words & Music—the album features a total of eight musicians, more than any other Planxty album. The core line-up of Christy Moore, Dónal Lunny, Andy Irvine and Liam O'Flynn are joined again by flautist Matt Molloy, who had left the band shortly after the release of After The Break to join The Chieftains full-time. Newcomer Bill Whelan joined the group in the studio to play keyboards, as did the concertina/fiddle duo of Noel Hill and Tony Linnane, who completed a short tour of Ireland with the group prior to the recording.

The album concludes with an epic nine and a half minute rendition of the ballad "Little Musgrave", which Moore had previously recorded on his self-titled solo album, in 1976. Moore has stated that he first found the song's lyrics on papers scattered on the floor of an auctioneer's in Dublin, although the song had previously been recorded by many artists (see "Matty Groves").

== Track listing ==
All titles credited to Andy Irvine, Dónal Lunny, Christy Moore and Liam O'Flynn; except where indicated.

1. "True Love Knows No Season" (song) – 5:29
  (Norman Blake)
2. "Out On The Ocean / Tiocfaidh Tu Abhaile Liom" (double jigs) – 3:20
3. "Roger O'Hehir" (song) – 5:33
4. "The Tailor's Twist" (hornpipes) – 3:14
  (Traditional; arranged by Liam O'Flynn)
5. "Kellswater" (song) – 4:59
6. "Johnny of Brady's Lea" (song) – 6:31
7. "The Woman I Never Forgot / The Pullet / The Ladies Pantalettes" (reels) – 4:19
8. "Little Musgrave" (song) – 9:38
9. "Paddy Fahy's Reel" (reel) – 1:48
  (Played on flute by Matt Molloy, with keyboard accompaniment, as the album fades out).

On the vinyl album as released “Kellswater” is actually track 3, and “Roger O’Hehir” is track 5, contrary to the sleeve notes.

For a detailed analysis of this album's contents see the Irishtune.info album page.

== Personnel ==
- Christy Moore - vocals, guitar, bodhrán
- Andy Irvine - vocals, mandolin, bouzouki, harmonica
- Dónal Lunny - bouzouki, guitar, synthesiser
- Liam O'Flynn - uilleann pipes, tin whistle
- Matt Molloy - flute
- Bill Whelan - keyboards
- Noel Hill - concertina
- Tony Linnane - fiddle
