= The Well Below the Valley (album) =

Studio album by Planxty
- Released: 1973
- Recorded: June 18–30, 1973
- Studios: Escape Studios, Kent, England
- Genre: Irish folk music
- Length: 45:13
- Labels: Polydor Records; Shanachie Records
- Producer: Phil Coulter

Planxty chronology
| Planxty (1973) | The Well Below the Valley (1973) | Cold Blow and the Rainy Night (1974) |

Alternative cover
- The Well Below the Valley German cover

Professional ratings
Review scores
| Source | Rating |
|---|---|
| Allmusic | 4.5/5 stars |

The Well Below the Valley is the second album by the Irish folk group Planxty. It was recorded at Escape Studios in Kent, England, from 18 June 1973 until the end of the month, and was released later that year. It takes its title from the sixth song on the album, "The Well Below the Valley".

== Track listing ==
All titles are Traditional, arranged by Planxty, except track 12.

1. "Cúnla" (song) – 3:54
2. "Pat Reilly" (song) – 3:15
3. "The Kid on the Mountain"/"An Phis Fhliuch" (slip jigs) – 3:49
4. "As I Roved Out (Andy)" (song) – 5:19
5. "The Dogs Among the Bushes"/"Jenny's Wedding" (reels) – 2:37
6. "The Well Below the Valley" (song) – 5:30
7. "Hewlett" (waltz) – 2:30
8. "Bean Pháidin" (song) – 3:42
9. "The Fisherman's Lilt"/"Cronin's Hornpipe" (hornpipes) – 3:14
10. "As I Roved Out (Christy)" (song) – 3:49
11. "Humours of Ballyloughlin" (jig) – 2:11
12. "Time Will Cure Me" (song) – 5:23
  (Andy Irvine)

For a detailed analysis of this album's contents see the Irishtune.info album page.

== Personnel ==
- Christy Moore - vocals, guitar, bodhrán
- Andy Irvine - vocals, mandolin, bouzouki, harmonica
- Dónal Lunny - bouzouki, vocals
- Liam O'Flynn - uilleann pipes, tin whistle
