= Taffy Thomas =

British storyteller

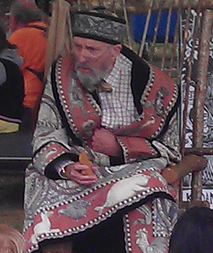
- Occupation: Storyteller

Taffy Thomas, MBE is a storyteller, based in Grasmere in the English Lake District.

== Biography ==
Thomas trained as a Literature and Drama teacher at Dudley College of Education, before teaching in Wolverhampton. While teaching, he also founded two companies to promote folk theatre and rural arts. Thomas fronted and performed in the Fabulous Salami Brothers, the popular touring unit of Charivari, while The Magic Lantern traveled Europe illustrating folk songs by use of shadow puppets.

A stroke at the age of 36 brought another change in direction when he turned to storytelling as self-imposed speech therapy. Now widely acknowledged as England's leading proponent in the art of traditional storytelling, Thomas boasts a repertoire of over 300 tales and elaborate 'lies' collected predominantly from oral sources and folklore. With so many stories in Thomas's head, fellow storyteller Giles Abbot once remarked "when Taffy goes it will be like a library burning down."

In the 2001 New Year Honours List, he was awarded the MBE for services to storytelling and charity, and later in the year performed a new collaboration for the Blue Peter Prom at the Royal Albert Hall in London.

In September 2009, Thomas accepted the honorary position of the UK's first Laureate for Storytelling, which was officially launched on 30 January 2010 at the British Library as part of a series of national events for National Storytelling Week, for a period of two years. Brian Patten, Michael Rosen, Pete Suchil Chand, Patsy Heap, Del Reid and Simon Thirsk are patrons and official guardians of the first laureate for storytelling.

Combining the fields of education and entertainment, Thomas has toured nationally and internationally, appearing at the Settle Storytelling Festival, Bergen Arts Festival in Norway, the American National Storytelling Festival, and a stint as storyteller-in-residence for the programme of summer residencies at the National Center for Storytelling in Jonesborough, Tennessee in 2006.

Thomas is currently artistic director of Tales in Trust, the Northern Centre for Storytelling, in Grasmere, and a patron of the Society for Storytelling.
