= Give Me Your Hand =

Early 17th-century Irish tune by Rory Dall O'Cahan

"Give Me Your Hand" (Irish: Tabhair dom do Lámh) is a tune from early 17th century Ireland by Rory Dall O'Cahan. It is one of the most widely recorded pieces of Irish traditional music.

== Composer ==
According to Edward Bunting, in The Ancient Music of Ireland, this harp tune was written in about 1603 by Rory Dall O'Cahan.

This tune, revived by Seán Ó Riada, was originally a composition of the blind Derry harpist Ruaidri Dáll Ó Catháin. He wrote it while (in) Scotland, where he had a disagreement with a Lady Eglington. He composed the tune for her when she apologized.

from the Wolfetones.

Captain Francis O'Neill suggests

Proud and spirited, he resented anything in the nature of trespass on his dignity. Among his visits to the houses of Scottish nobility, he is said to have called at Eglinton Castle, Ayrshire. Knowing he was a harper, but being unaware of his rank, Lady Eglinton commanded him to play a tune. Taking offence at her peremptory manner, Ó Catháin refused and left the castle. When she found out who her guest was her ladyship sought and effected a speedy reconciliation. This incident furnished a theme for one of the harper’s best compositions. “Tabhair Damh do Lámh,” or “Give Me Your Hand!” The name has been latinized into “Da Mihi Manum.” The fame of the composition and the occasion which gave birth to it reaching the ear of King James the Sixth, induced him to send for the composer. Ó Catháin accordingly attended at the Scottish court, and created a sensation.

There are other stories and legends, but no authoritative evidence or references are known.

The tune is sometimes claimed to be written by the famous harpist [O'Carolan], who lived some years later. However, there is no reference in the Bunting collection of O Carolan’s music. Nor should Rory Dall O'Cahan be confused with another blind poet at around the same time, Rory 'Dall' Morrison.

A number of apocryphal stories have circulated about the circumstances of the tune's composition; further details can be seen at Andrew Kuntz's The Fiddler's Companion.

== Later references to the tune ==
The Fiddler's Companion says

The Latin title first appears in the Wemyss manuscript of 1644 and in the Balcarres manuscript of 1692

and then

The melody's popularity was long-lived, as attested by its appearance in many collections throughout the 18th century, including Wright's Aria di Camera (1730), Neal's Celebrated Irish Tunes (c. 1742—a revised date from the oft-given 1721 or 1726, this based on watermark research—see the appendix to the 2001 edition of O’Sullivan’s Carolan), Burk Thumoth's Twelve English and Irish Airs (c. 1745-50), Thompson's Hibernian Muse (c. 1786), Brysson's Curious Selection of Favourite Tunes (c. 1790), and Mulholland's Ancient Irish Airs (1810).

English and Irish titles first seem to have appeared in 'A Collection of Ancient Irish Airs', by John Mulholland, 2 vols. Belfast, 1810.

Seán Ó Riada is attributed with reviving the tune in the late 1960s.

== Some recordings of "Give Me Your Hand" (Tabhair dom do Lámh) ==
The Wolfe Tones and Family Pride were thought to be the only known recordings with vocals. However, in 2007 Mary Kay Aufrance composed lyrics and recorded the tune with her vocals, performing with her husband Tom as Gairin Celtic Music on their album Musical Dreams (2007) and she published her 2007 music score in her book titled Musical Dreams: Sheet Music and Lyrics.

- Áine Minogue & Druidstone - Tabhair dom do Lámh [The Vow-04](1998)
- Bandari - Tabhair dom do Lámh (Give me your Hand) [Garden Of Dreams-08] (1999)
- Bukkene Bruse - Tabhair Dom Do Lahm [Bukkene Bruse] (1993)
- Celtic Orchestra - Tabhair dom do Lámh [Classic Celtic Moods, CD3 - 02]
- Celtic Southern Cross - Give me your Hand [Begged Borrowed & Stolen, CD3 - 26]
- Ceoltóirí Chualann (with Seán Ó Riada)- Tabhair dom do Lámh [Ceol na nUasal - 08] ( 1967)
- Ceoltóirí Chualann - Tabhair dom do Lámh [Ó Riada - 11] (1971)
- Charles Guard - Tabhair dom do Lámh [Avenging & Bright - 08] (1991)
- Chris Thile & Brad Mehldau - Tabhair dom do Lámh [Chris Thile & Brad Mehldau - 11] (2017)
- Cobblers' Last - Peggy & the soldier, Give me your hand [Boot in the Door - 04]
- Comhaltas Ceoltóirí Éireann - Tabhair dom do Lámh [Foinn Seisiun Book 1, p. 42 - 19]
- Dancing Willow - Tabhair dom do Lámh, Give me your Hand (see recording link above)
- Emily Cullen - Tabhair dom do Lámh [Maidens Of The Celtic Harp - 14] (1997)
- George Winston - Tabhair dom do Lámh (La Valse...Jeunes Filles) [Plains-04] (1999)
- Tom & Mary Kay Aufrance - Give Me Your Hand [Musical Dreams] (2007)
- Innisfree Ceoil - Tabhair dom do Lámh [Celtic Airs, CD1 - 02] (1996)
- Bjarte Eike & Barokksolistene - Tabhair dom do lámh (‘Give me your hand’) [The Image of Melancholy] (2016)
- James Galway & The Chieftains - Give me your Hand [05]
- Jay Ungar & Molly Mason - Give Me Your Hand [The Lover's Waltz] (1997)
- Kate MacLeod & Kat Eggleston-Tabhair dom do Lámh [Drawn From The Well-09] (2002)
- Kim Robertson - Give me your Hand [Wind Shadows, Vol. I - 10] (1983)
- Lifescapes - Give me your Hand [Celtic Mystery - 08] (2000)
- Oliver Schroer - Tabhair dom do Lámh (Give me your Hand) [Celtic Devotion-09] (1999)
- Patrick Ball - Give me your Hand [Celtic Harp - The Music of Turlough O'Carolan - 10] (1983)
- Planxty - Raggle Taggle Gypsies, Tabhair dom do Lámh [Reunion Point Theatre, CD2-08](2004)
- Planxty - Raggle Taggle Gypsy, Tabhair dom do Lámh [Planxty - 01] (1973)
- Planxty - Tabhair dom do Lámh [Vicar Street, Dublin - February 2004]
- Pól O'Ceallaigh - Tabhair dom do Lámh [Celtic Drones - 11] (1993)
- Réalta - Tabhair Dom Do Lámh [Clear Skies] 2016
- Rosemary Beland - Tabhair dom do Lámh [The Tinkers' Wedding - 12] (1992)
- Spailpin (with Colum Mac Oireachtaigh) -White, Orange & Green, followed by Tabhair dom do Lámh [Whiskey in the Jar-08] (1991)
- The Chieftains - Tabhair dom do Lámh [The Chieftains 5 - 02](1975)
- The Chieftains - The Cloak, Tabhair dom do Lámh [The Essential Chieftains (CD1) - 17] (2006)
- The Chieftains & James Galway - Give me your hand [In Ireland - 05] (1987)
- The Irish and the Scotch - Give me your Hand [Open Folk - 04] (1999)
- The Rambling Irishmen - White, Orange & Green & Tabhair dom do Lámh [Songs of Old Ireland-01]
- Wolfe Tones - Tabhair dom do Lámh, Give me your Hand [Till Ireland a Nation - 13] (1974)
- Wolfe Tones - Tabhair dom do Lámh, Give me your Hand [25th Anniversary, CD1-12](1991)
- Family Pride- Give Me Your Hand 1972

== See also ==
- List of Irish ballads
