= Mickey MacConnell =

Northern Irish musician and songwriter (1947–2025)

- Born: Michael MacConnell; 28 December 1947; Bellanaleck, County Fermanagh, Northern Ireland
- Died: 3 July 2025 (aged 77) Listowel, County Kerry, Ireland
- Occupations: Musician; songwriter; journalist
- Years active: 1965–2000
- Spouse: Maura
- Website: mickeymacconnell.com

Michael MacConnell (28 December 1947 – 3 July 2025) was a Northern Irish musician and songwriter.

== Life and career ==
MacConnell was born on 28 December 1947, in Bellanaleck near Enniskillen, County Fermanagh, Northern Ireland. He was the youngest member of a musical family. He worked in Dublin for Irish Press Group and, later, with The Irish Times.

MacConnell began writing songs very early in his life. In 1965, he wrote "Only Our Rivers Run Free" — a song that describes the natural world being damaged by the Irish border and that has been described by Stuart Bailie as "political but not hectoring". This encouraged him to seriously devote himself to writing music when he moved to Listowel, County Kerry, where he lived with his wife, Maura.

MacConnell released two albums. His first album, Peter Pan and Me, was issued in 1992. His second, Joined Up Writing, was released in 2000.

MacConnell died after a short illness in Listowel, on 3 July 2025, at the age of 77.

== Discography ==
Name	Year	Label	Type
Peter Pan And Me	1992	Spring Records	Album
Joined Up Writing	2000	Spring Records; Elm Grove Music	Album

== See also ==
- Music of Ireland
