= Noel Hill (musician) =

Irish concertina player (born 1958)

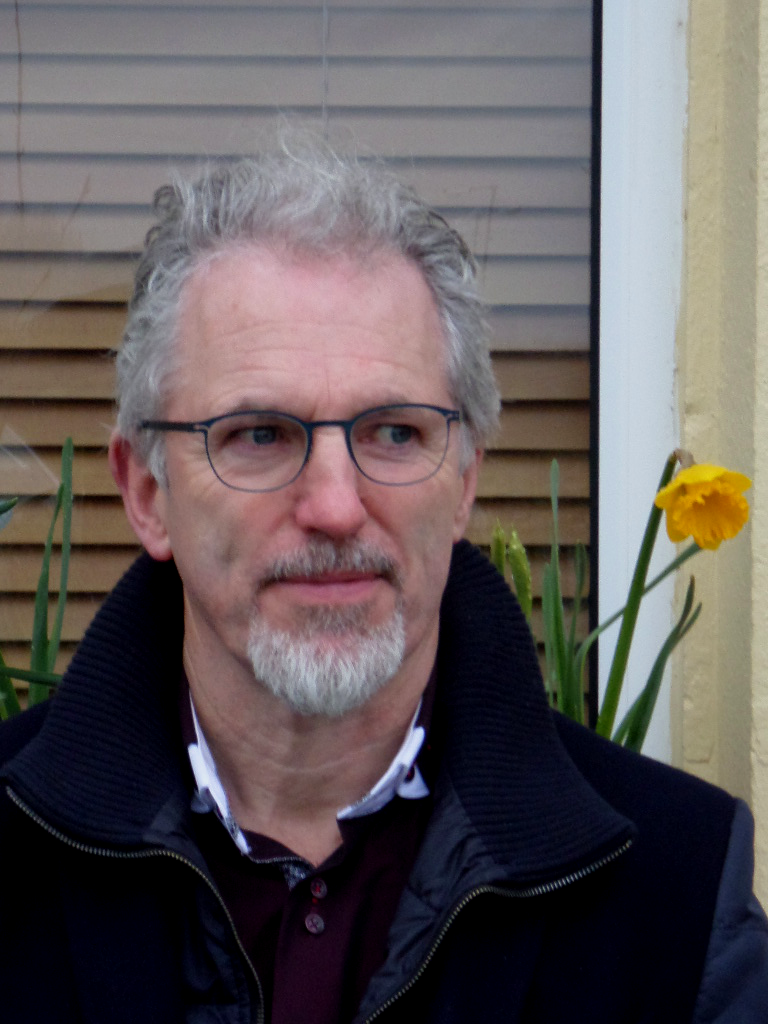

Background information
- Born: Noel Hill; 1958 (age 67–68); Caherea, Lissycasey, Co. Clare, Ireland
- Occupation: Irish concertina player
- Instrument: concertina
- Website: www.noelhill.com

Noel Hill (born 1958) is an Irish concertina player from County Clare who has had great influence developing the modern playing style of the Irish concertina, as a performer and educator.

== Early life ==
Noel Hill was born in Caherea in West County Clare, Ireland, into a family with seven siblings. His parents and grandparents were all concertina players. He was particularly influenced by his uncle, Padraig A Chnoic, (Paddy Hill). He lived in a house which was the last house in the area to hold the traditional Irish house dance, where musicians were always welcomed; particularly towards the end of the year when farm work was done. It was at these events that he learned his early tunes, rather than from the radio, books or records.

Hill started playing at nine and listened extensively to Willie Clancy, Paddy Canny, Peter O'Loughlin, Paddy Murphy, and Micky Hanrahan. Much of the music in his later repertoire comes from the music he learned as a child from those players. Hill wanted to be play the uilleann pipes, but pipes were not readily available. However, the pipes were to influence his style of concertina playing. Hill states that the concertina which he took up had initially been purchased for his brother.

== Musical career ==
Hill has been a professional concertinist since the late 1970s. He joined up with Tony Linnane, Tony Callanan and Kieran Hanrahan to form the group Inchiquin. They recorded one album. Hanrahan and Callanan then left to form Stockton's Wing. His most celebrated album is Noel Hill and Tony Linnane (1979) with Tony Linnane (fiddle), Matt Molloy (flute), Alec Finn (bouzouki and mando-cello) and Micheal O'Domhnaill (church harmonium). Inchiquin continued with Noel, Tony and Barry Moore (Luka Bloom) and toured Germany.

The Pogues wrote the tune "Planxty Noel Hill" in response to his criticism of their band during a radio interview; the tune appeared on their 1986 Poguetry in Motion EP.

Hill has toured worldwide including Europe, United States, Canada, China, Hong Kong, and Australia. He teaches concertina at the Noel Hill Irish Concertina Schools in Ireland and throughout the United States. With his two children, he now lives in Connemara in the Irish-speaking region of southwest County Galway.

In 2008 Hill's career suffered a setback when he sustained major injuries during an assault in a pub toilet at the hands of a construction labourer, purportedly over a payment dispute that was under litigation. Hill suffered multiple facial fractures, spent three weeks in hospital, and required extensive surgeries and rehabilitation. During trial testimony in 2015, Hill stated that his ability to perform the concertina had been permanently impaired by the attack, requiring that he only play for short periods of time and use medication and acupuncture therapy in order to perform.

== Discography ==
=== Solo ===
- The Irish Concertina (1982); voted the "Irish Folk Album of the Year" in 1988
- The Irish Concertina Two (2005)
- The Irish Concertina 3: Live in New York (2017)

=== With Inchiquin ===
- Inchiquin (1976)

=== With Tony Linnane ===
- Noel Hill & Tony Linnane (Tara, 1979)

=== With Tony MacMahon ===
- I gCnoc Na Graí (In Knocknagree) (1985)

=== With Tony Mac Mahon and Iarla Ó Lionáird ===
- Aislingí Ceoil - Music Of Dreams (1993)

=== As session musician ===
- Mairéad Ní Dhómhnaill, Mairéad Ní Dhómhnaill (1976)
- Christy Moore, The Iron Behind the Velvet (1978)
- Paul Brady, Welcome Here Kind Stranger (1978)
- Mick Hanly, As I Went Over Blackwater (1980)
- Planxty, The Woman I Loved So Well (1980)
- Iarla Ó Lionáird, I Could Read the Sky (2000)
- Paul Brady, The Missing Liberty Tapes (2001)
- Paddy Glackin and Micheál Ó Domhnaill, Athchuairt/Reprise (2001)

=== Anthologies ===
- The 4th. Irish Folk Festival (1977)
- The Green Fields of America (1979)
- H - Block (1981)
- Treasury of Irish Song, Vol. 2 (1995)
- Treasury of Irish Song, Vol. 3 (1995)
- BLASTA! - The Irish Traditional Music Special (1997)
- Anglo International (2006)
- Experience Ireland (2007)
- All in Good Time: Traditional Irish Folk, Jigs and Reels (2012)
