= Glór Theatre =

Coordinates: 52°50′40.2″N 8°58′37.13″W

glór
- Interactive map of glór
- Former names: glor Irish Music Centre
- Address: Causeway Link, Ennis, County Clare V95 VHP0
- Seating type: Seating
- Capacity: 485
- Type: Concert Hall, Performing Arts Venue

Construction
- Opened: 2001

Website
- www.glor.ie

glór, formerly glór Irish Music Centre, is a concert and events venue in Ireland, located in the town of Ennis County Clare. Its capacity allows for 485 people for seated performances. glór also has a studio space for smaller events and artist use, an art gallery, café and bar.

Since opening in 2001 the venue has become a setting for a wide range of acts including stand-up comedy, drama performances, art exhibitions and a variety of concerts.

glór was designed by Des McMahon of Gilroy McMahon Architects. The challenge was to create a building which would allow the user to experience Irish music in an intimate and real way, whether in a small group or as a member of a large audience.

== Awards ==
It was nominated for the Munster category of the IMRO Live Music Venue of the Year Award in 2008 and won that award in 2012.
