= Blacksmith (song) =

Traditional song

"Blacksmith"
Performed by Celtic Aire of the United States Air Force Band

"Blacksmith", also known as "A Blacksmith Courted Me", is a traditional English folk song listed as number 816 in the Roud Folk Song Index.

== Traditional versions ==
The song was noted down by Ralph Vaughan Williams in 1909 from a Mrs Ellen Powell of Westhope near Weobley, Herefordshire; his transcription is available online from the Vaughan Williams Memorial Library. On that occasion it was sung to the tune "Monk's Gate", better known as the tune of "To be a pilgrim", the hymn by John Bunyan. The same tune is sometimes used for the song "Our Captain Cried", which can be considered a version of the same song. George Butterworth (a friend of Vaughan Williams and Cecil Sharp) collected another version of the song with a similar tune from a Mrs. Verrall of Horsham, Sussex in 1909, and included a setting of the song in his 1912 collection Folk Songs from Sussex.

Several traditional singers from the south of England have recorded versions of the song, such as the travellers Phoebe Smith (1969) and Caroline Hughes (1963/66), Harry Brazil of Gloucestershire, George "Pop" Maynard of Sussex (1962), Tom Willett of Surrey (1960), Charlie Scamp of Kent (1954). The recordings of Tom Willet, Phoebe Smith, Caroline Hughes and George "Pop" Maynard can be heard via the Vaughan Williams Memorial Library website.

== Popular recordings ==
The song has been recorded many times. Steeleye Span lead off their first two studio albums Hark! The Village Wait (1970) and Please to See the King (1971) with different versions of the song; it also can be heard on several of their live albums. Andy Irvine sings it on Planxty's debut album Planxty (1973), Loreena McKennitt on Elemental (1985), Pentangle on the album So Early in the Spring (1989), and Eddi Reader on Mirmama (1992). Maddy Prior (of Steeleye Span) also sings an a cappella version of the song on her solo album Ballads and Candles (2000).

Being a well-documented song and publicised by English Folk Dance and Song Society, The Broadside Ballads Project, and Mainly Norfolk, the song was recorded by Jon Boden and Oli Steadman for inclusion in their respective lists of daily folk songs "A Folk Song a Day" and "365 Days Of Folk".

There are also versions by Martin Simpson and Kathy & Carol, The Critics Group, Shirley Collins, Barbara Dickson on the album Do Right Woman, Phil Cooper on the album Pretty Susan, Scatter the Mud on the album In the Mood. Linda Ronstadt gives an a cappella rendition on the 1990 compilation album Rubáiyát. Barry Dransfield recorded an unusual instrumental version of the tune. Jah Wobble recorded a version of the song on his 1996 album English Roots Music. Runa recorded a version on their debut album Jealousy.

For a discography with lyric versions, see Reinhard Zierke's site.

== Lyrics ==
(collected by Ralph Vaughan Williams from Ellen Powell, 1909)

A blacksmith courted me, nine months or better
He bravely won my heart, wrote me a letter
With his hammer in his hand, he looked quite clever
And if I was with my love, I'd live forever

But where is my love gone, with his cheeks like roses
And his good black billycock on, all crowned with primroses
I'm afraid the scorching sun, will shine and burn his beauty
And if I was with my love, I'd do my duty

Strange news has come to town, strange news is carried
Strange news flies up and down, that my love he's married
I wish them both much joy though they can't hear me
And may God reward them well for the slighting of me

Don't you remember well, when you lay beside me
And you said you'd marry me and not deny me
If I said I'd marry you, it was only for to try you
But bring your witness love, and I'll not deny you

Oh witness have I none, save God almighty
And may he reward you well, for the slighting of me
Her lips grew pale and wan, it made her poor heart tremble
To think she loved a one and he proved deceitful
