= Lord Baker (song) =

"Lord Baker" is the name of a traditional folk song (Roud 40), sung in English and recorded and collected by Tom Munnelly from the singing of John Reilly. It is also recorded in English by Sinéad O'Connor, Susan McKeown and Christy Moore.

Although collected in Ireland, the song is closely related to a number of songs from the British tradition including "Lord Bateman" and "Young Beichan".
