= Cliffs of Dooneen =

Irish ballad

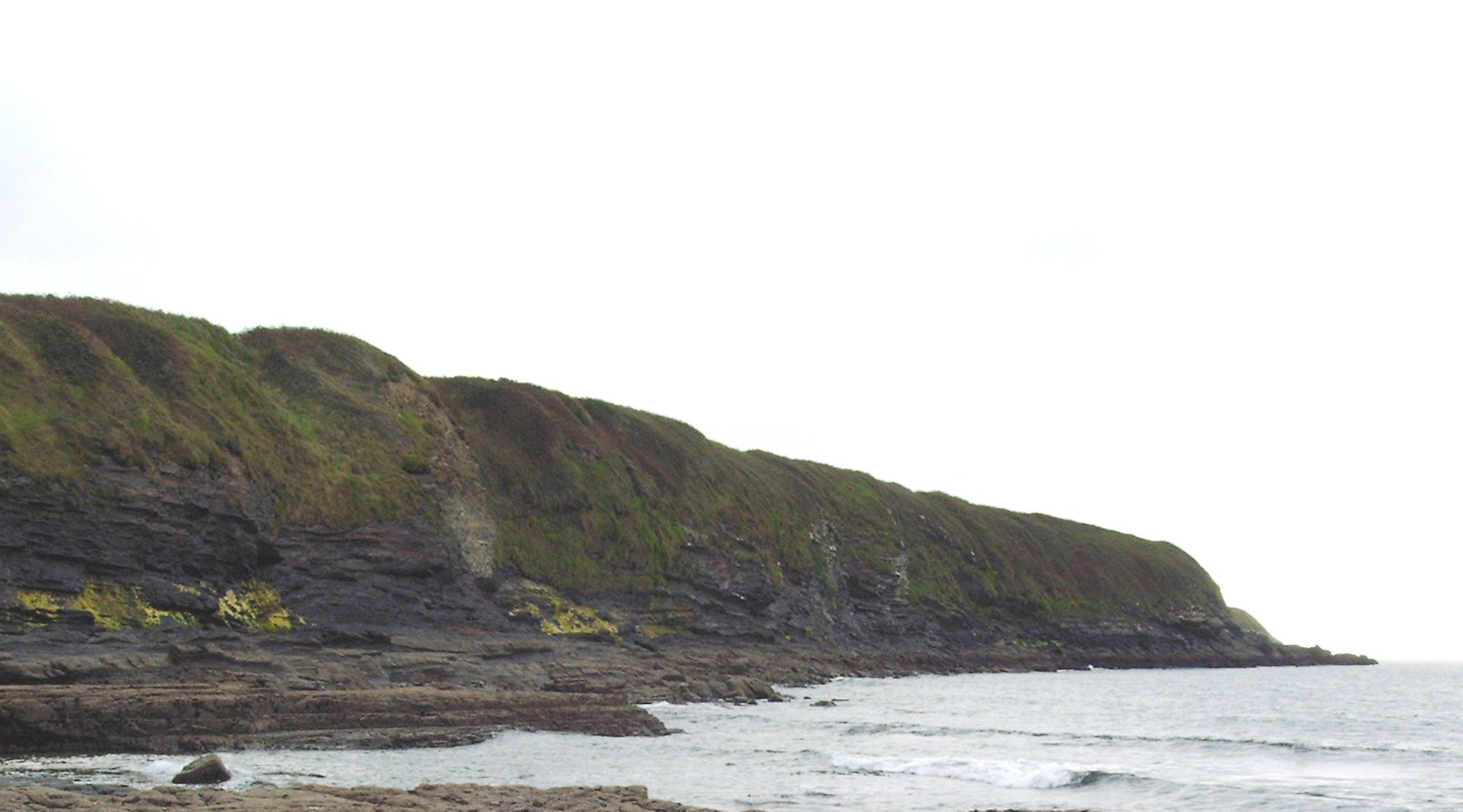
- Cliffs of Dooneen

Song
- Songwriter: Jack McAuliffe

The "Cliffs of Dooneen" is an Irish ballad made famous by Planxty. It is often performed by Christy Moore. The song was written by Jack McAuliffe from Lixnaw, County Kerry about the cliffs around Dooneen Point near Beale, Kerry in the west of Ireland.

== Confusion over the location ==
The mention of the west coast of County Clare and the towns of Kilkee and Kilrush have made the song a County Clare anthem, with the words "Cliffs of Dooneen" often changed to "Hills of Moveen", a location a few miles west of Kilkee. This has led to confusion over the location of the cliffs which some assume to be in Clare rather than in Kerry.

In September 2010 the confusion was mentioned in a lighthearted Irishman's Diary article which provoked responses from the public in the follow-up article.

Dooneen Point is clearly marked on the historic Ordnance Survey of Ireland map. The cliffs themselves can also be seen from satellite photos.

Some doubt the ability to see both Kilkee (on the north of the Clare peninsula) and Kilrush (on the south of the Clare peninsula) from North Kerry. The following photographs taken from the same spot show Beale, Kerry in the foreground with Clare towns in the distance.

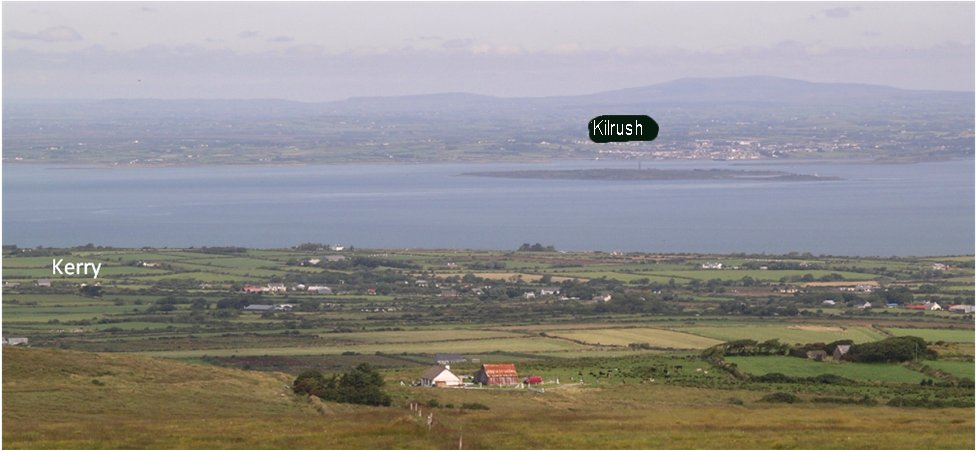
Kilrush from County Kerry

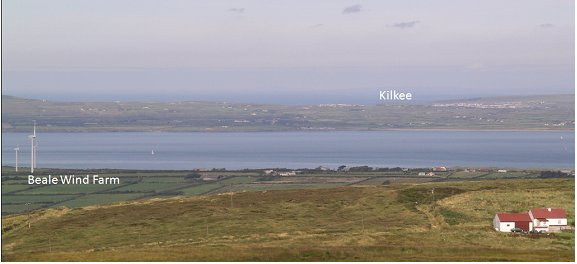
Kilkee from County Kerry

== Origins of the song ==
The late Liam Buckley, who was born in the cottage immediately adjacent to the Cliffs of Dooneen, has stated the poem was penned by Jack McAuliffe who had travelled from Lixnaw to Beale to visit his sister. Jack had spent time with locals in the fields above and shore below the cliffs. He then visited Bill and Nell Buckley's cottage, known as "99" a few hundred metres away - for tea and scones. Liam was told by his mother (Jack's host) that the poem was written at the kitchen window of the cottage. Liam says the poem was put to music years later by a local musician. Liam did not know the date the poem was written but he remembers it from the 1930s.

A variation of Liam Buckley's account from Jack McAuliffe's niece also exists which suggests it was written in the adjoining cottage occupied by Bob Boyle.
