= Planxty =

Irish folk music band

- Origin: Kildare/Dublin, Ireland
- Genre: Irish folk music
- Years active: 1972–1975; 1978–1983; 2003–2005
- Past members: Christy Moore; Dónal Lunny; Andy Irvine; Liam O'Flynn; Johnny Moynihan; Paul Brady; Matt Molloy; Bill Whelan; Nollaig Casey; Noel Hill; Tony Linnane; Dolores Keane

Planxty were an Irish folk music band formed in January 1972, consisting initially of Christy Moore (vocals, acoustic guitar, bodhrán), Andy Irvine (vocals, mandolin, mandola, bouzouki, hurdy-gurdy, harmonica), Dónal Lunny (bouzouki, guitars, bodhrán, keyboards), and Liam O'Flynn (uilleann pipes, tin whistle). They transformed and popularized Irish folk music, touring and recording to great acclaim.

Subsequently, Johnny Moynihan, Paul Brady, Matt Molloy (flute), Bill Whelan (keyboards), Nollaig Casey (fiddle) and briefly, Noel Hill (concertina) and Tony Linnane (fiddle) were also temporary members.

Planxty broke up twice, first in December 1975 and again in April 1983. The original quartet reunited in October 2003 and their final performance was on 31 January 2005.

== History ==
=== Formation and first run (1972–1975) ===
Christy Moore and Dónal Lunny had been friends since school days in Newbridge, County Kildare, Lunny having taught Moore how to play both guitar and bodhrán. Before the formation of Planxty, Lunny had been playing in a duet with Andy Irvine after the latter's return from Eastern Europe and they had also launched their own folk club, downstairs at Slattery's, called The Mugs Gig. Liam O'Flynn was playing in public and on the radio, and was well respected in traditional folk circles. All members were familiar with one another's work to varying degrees but were first brought together during the summer of 1971 to record Moore's second solo album, Prosperous, at his sister's house, in the village of the same name.

In January 1972, the four joined forces to form Planxty, recording their first single, "Three Drunken Maidens"/"Sí-Bheag, Sí-Mhór", in Trend Studios on 18 January 1972. The band performed on RTÉ's The Late, Late Show the following Saturday, 22 January 1972, and played their first show on 6 March 1972, a 30-minute set at The Mugs Gig on a bill that included balladeer Paddy Reilly. They then assumed a weekly residency at The Mugs Gig, began rehearsing, and started playing live around Ireland.

The group's first major performance–opening for Donovan at the Hangar in Galway, at Easter 1972–was a huge success. Neither the audience nor the band knew what to expect, and both were pleasantly surprised. Irvine, unable to see the audience through the glare of the stage lights, was worried that the crowd might be on the verge of rioting. It took him several minutes to realize that what he was hearing was the expression of their enthusiasm. A rough quality recording of the song "Raggle Taggle Gypsy" from this concert was included on the 2004 retrospective, Christy Moore – The Box Set: 1964–2004, complete with the audience's reaction.

Planxty's first single, "Three Drunken Maidens", was released by their manager Des Kelly's label, Ruby Records, reaching no. 7 in the Irish charts. The next single, a re-recording of "The Cliffs of Dooneen", previously recorded for the Prosperous album, made it to no. 3. Two full albums followed: Planxty, recorded at Command Studios in London during September 1972, and The Well Below the Valley, recorded at the Escape Studios in Kent, from 18 June 1973.

The group's increasing popularity led to heavy touring throughout Ireland, Britain, France, Germany, Italy, Spain and northern Europe.

Tired of constant touring and wishing to explore other musical avenues, Lunny left Planxty at the start of September 1973, playing his last gig with the band at the Edinburgh Festival. He would eventually end up a member of The Bothy Band. Johnny Moynihan, who had played with Irvine in Sweeney's Men, joined at this point, playing mandolin, bouzouki, fiddle, tin whistle and singing. This line-up, with contributions from Lunny, would record Planxty's third album, Cold Blow and the Rainy Night in Sarm Studios, Whitechapel in London during August 1974.

Next to leave, shortly after the making of this album, was Moore, who had a desire to return to his solo career and perform from a larger repertoire of songs. The split was amicable, and while Paul Brady was recruited to fill the gap in September 1974, Moore stayed on with him in the band until October. After his departure, the Irvine/Moynihan/Brady/O’Flynn line-up toured extensively but released no recordings before playing their final show in Brussels on 5 December 1975.

=== Reunion and second run (1978–1983) ===
After the break-up, Moynihan retreated into obscurity, continuing to perform occasionally, but rarely recorded. Irvine and Brady toured together as a duo and, in August 1976 recorded an album at the Rockfield Studios, Andy Irvine/Paul Brady, produced by Lunny who also plays on most tracks, and with Kevin Burke on fiddle. For a while, Irvine continued to tour with Brady in Ireland and in the UK, and also with Mick Hanly, predominantly in Europe. In 1978, Brady released a solo album (Welcome Here Kind Stranger) including Irvine, Tommy Peoples and Lunny who also produced it.

The original four members of Planxty, however, continued to encounter each other socially, on the stage, and in the studio. It eventually led to a reunion encouraged by music promoter Kevin Flynn, who would become their manager. They were joined this time by Matt Molloy, who had been a member of The Bothy Band with Lunny and was also a close friend of O'Flynn's. Beginning rehearsals at Molloy's home on Tuesday, 19 September 1978, the line-up went on a mammoth European tour the following year, from 15 April to 11 June 1979, during which the band played forty-seven concerts in fifty-eight days, in the UK, Germany, Switzerland, Belgium, France and Ireland.

From 18 to 30 June 1979, Planxty recorded their fourth album, After the Break, at the Windmill Lane Studios in Dublin; it was produced by Lunny and released on the Tara Records label. Molloy left the group to join The Chieftains shortly after the album was recorded; he remains with them to this day. In between the Planxty activity, Irvine squeezed in tours in Europe with Lunny, Mick Hanly and Gerry O'Beirne. He also recorded his first solo album, Rainy Sundays... Windy Dreams, at Windmill Lane Studios in late 1979, produced by Lunny and released on Tara Records in 1980.

On 28 February 1980, Planxty headlined the Sense of Ireland concert at the Royal Albert Hall in London. When they returned to Ireland, they recorded two programmes for RTÉ at the Pavilion Theatre in Dún Laoghaire, then started rehearsals at Kilkea Castle in Castledermot, County Kildare with two musicians from County Clare: concertina player Noel Hill and fiddler Tony Linnane. The six-member lineup of Moore, Irvine, Lunny, O’Flynn, Hill, and Linnane were joined by Molloy and keyboardist Bill Whelan, to record the band's fifth album, The Woman I Loved So Well, at Windmill Lane Studios for two sessions: 23–29 April and 16–19 May. The album was wrapped up with a reception at Windmill Lane Studios on 9 June 1980.

The band began touring as a four-piece during the summer of 1980, playing a tour of Italian castles in July and returning to The Boys of Ballisodare Festival on 9 August, joined by Whelan and a young Cork fiddler, Nollaig Casey. Shows around this time would feature the four-piece band for the first set, with Whelan and Casey joining in for the second set. This line-up played a week of shows at the Olympia Theatre in Dublin on 18–23 August 1980, taped for a potential live album, which eventually emerged in 1987 as the unlicensed release The Best of Planxty Live. The line-up, augmented by a full orchestra and rhythm section, also recorded "Timedance" in 1981 as part of the Eurovision Song Contest; "Timedance" was the genesis for what Whelan later developed into Riverdance.

The six-piece Planxty continued to tour but began to drift apart. O’Flynn took on a project with Shaun Davey, The Brendan Voyage. Moore & Lunny, eager to experiment with a rhythm section and a different, more political, song set, formed Moving Hearts. Lunny also kept busy producing albums by other artists. The original four-piece line-up played their last show together on 24 August 1982, at the National Stadium in Dublin. Nevertheless, the band (with Whelan and Casey still on board) recorded one final album at Windmill Lane Studios for the WEA label in late October and early November 1982, Words & Music, which also featured contributions from fiddler James Kelly and Moving Hearts bass guitarist Eoghan O’Neill.

The divided attention of two bands proved too much and in early 1983, Lunny and Moore left to concentrate on Moving Hearts. Irvine, O’Flynn, and Whelan decided to continue as Planxty, retaining fiddler James Kelly and recruiting Arty McGlynn of County Tyrone on guitar, plus Galway’s Dolores Keane on vocals and a plethora of traditional instruments. Irvine would later dub this line-up "Planxty-Too-Far", as the personnel and musical focus, now more dominated by Whelan, was far removed from the original Planxty.

A tour of Ireland in the spring of 1983, including the National Stadium in Dublin on 27 April, was the end of the group. In the words of Andy Irvine:

I left on a long tour and travelled to the Balkans two days later and was in contact with Bill by phone once or twice. We had agreed to do more gigs in the autumn. I didn't get back till the middle of June and I found, to my surprise, that the band hadn't exactly split up, it had just fallen asunder. An unfortunate ending to the second coming...

— Leagues O'Toole, The Humours of Planxty.

Although Moore, Irvine, Lunny, and O'Flynn continued to meet from time to time and perform occasionally in various combinations during professional engagements—and even play together as a foursome in the privacy of Moore's house at least once—rumours of putative reunions circulated for over two decades.

=== No Disco Documentary (2002–2003) ===
In late 2002, broadcaster and journalist Leagues O'Toole was working as presenter and researcher for the RTÉ television show No Disco and persuaded the programme editor, Rory Cobbe, to develop a one-off documentary about Planxty.

O'Toole interviewed Moore, Irvine, and O'Flynn but Lunny, who was living in Japan was unavailable. After also shooting links at key landmarks from the Planxty history, the programme aired on 3 March 2003, receiving a phenomenal response from the public and very positive feedback from the Planxty members themselves. In a final comment about the constant speculation of the original line-up regrouping, Moore had said on camera: "There's nobody longs for it more than myself and the other three guys. Definitely the time is right. Let's go for it".

=== "The Third Coming" (2003–2005) ===
On Tuesday, 7 October 2003, O'Toole received a postcard from Moore reading: "There might be something of interest happening on Saturday. I'll be in touch". It turned out that Paddy Doherty, owner of the Royal Spa Hotel in Lisdoonvarna (and co-founder of the Lisdoonvarna Music Festival), had arranged for the band's use of the hotel's old dining room for rehearsals, which led to a one-off concert there in front of 200 people on 11 October 2003. Moore, on stage, credited the No Disco documentary with inspiring the reunion.

Pleased with the results and the experience of playing together again, the original Planxty quartet agreed to the longed-for reunion (dubbed "The Third Coming") and performed together again, on and off, for a period of just over a year.

First, they played a series of concerts at the Glór Theatre in Ennis, County Clare (on 23 & 24 January 2004) and at Vicar Street in Dublin (on 30 & 31 January and on 4 & 5, 11 & 12 February 2004), which were recorded and from which selected material was released on the CD Live 2004 and its associated DVD.

In late 2004 and early 2005, another round of concerts took place at the following venues:

- Radisson SAS Hotel in Galway (6, 7 and 8 October 2004);
- Point Theatre in Dublin (28, 29 and 30 December 2004, plus extra dates on 3, 4 and 5 January 2005);
- Waterfront Hall in Belfast (19, 20 and 21 January 2005);
- Barbican Centre in London (29, 30 and 31 January 2005).

Planxty remained a four-piece throughout this period, with Moore occasionally playing keyboards. Since then there has been no further activity; Moore has said he would not participate in another reunion but gave his blessing to the others for the future use of the Planxty name.

=== The Humours of Planxty (2006) ===
Leagues O'Toole documented the history and development of the group in the biography The Humours of Planxty, which was published by Hodder Headline in 2006.

=== LAPD (2012–2013) ===
Friday, 20 January 2012 ushered in the inaugural gig at Dublin's Vicar Street, of a quartet including three members of the original Planxty. They called themselves 'LAPD', after the initials of their first names: Liam O'Flynn, Andy Irvine, Paddy Glackin, and Dónal Lunny.

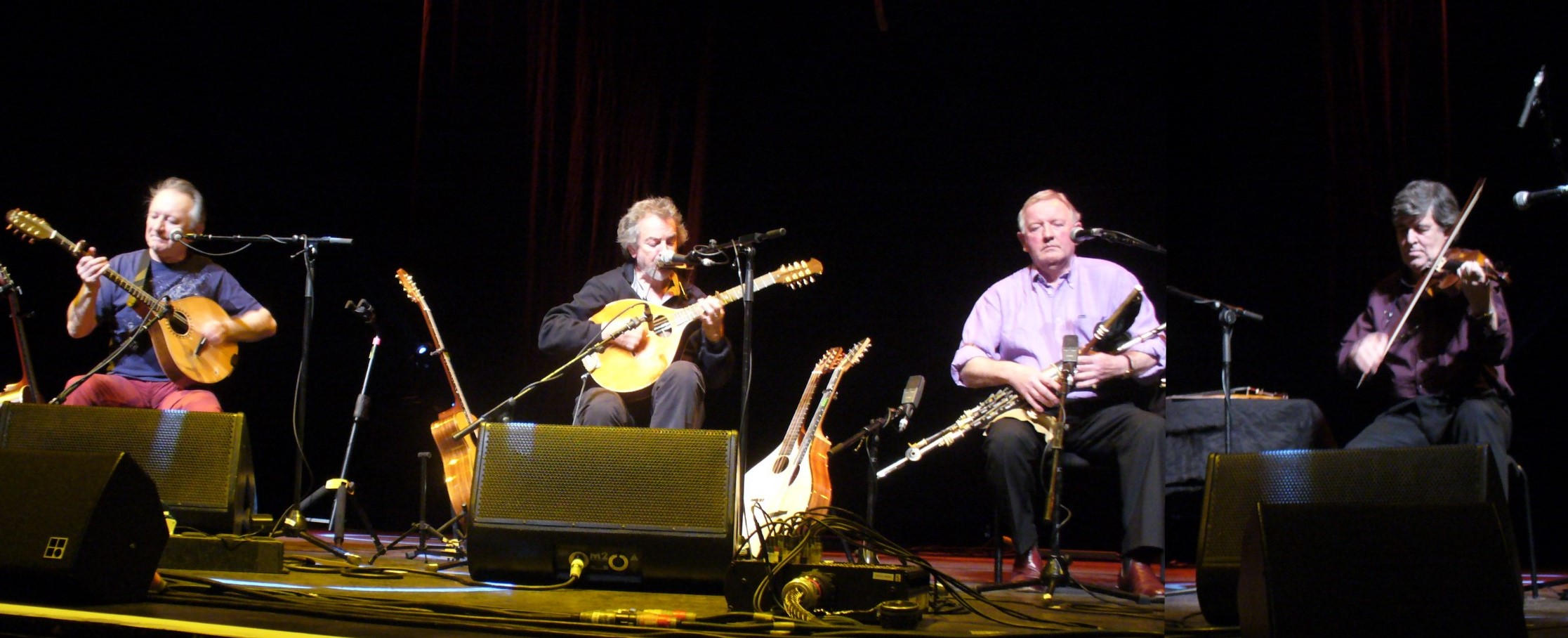
Dónal Lunny, Andy Irvine, Liam O'Flynn and Paddy Glackin as 'LAPD', March 2012

They played a set combining tunes and songs from the repertoires of:

- Planxty: "Jenny's Wedding/The Virginia/Garrett Barry's", "Paddy Canny's" ("The Starting Gate"), "The Jolly Beggar/The Wise Maid", "Arthur MacBride", "As I Roved Out (Andy)", "The Blacksmith/Blacksmithereens" and "West Coast of Clare"
- Irvine & Lunny: "My Heart's tonight in Ireland/West Clare Reel", "Braes of Moneymore", "Suleiman's Kopanitsa", "The Dream/Indiana", "O'Donoghue's" and "Siún Ni Dhuibhir"
- O'Flynn & Glackin: "Kitty's Rambles/Humours of Ennistymon", "The Green Island/Bantry Hornpipe", "Young Tom Ennis/Nora Crean", "A Rainy Day/The Shaskeen", "Two Flings", "Speed the Plough/Colonel Fraser" and "The Gold Ring".

In June of 2012, at a pair of concerts to mark Andy Irvine's 70th birthday, LAPD performed two songs that had been Planxty standards, "The West Coast of Clare" and "The Blacksmith", which were included on a subsequent live album. Paul Brady performed on the latter, making it a Planxty reunion of sorts.

LAPD performed only occasionally, to rave reviews, but never recorded before their final performance, which took place at Sligo Live, on Saturday 26 October 2013.

=== Usher's Island (2015–present day) ===
When O'Flynn resigned from LAPD, Irvine, Lunny and Glackin were joined by Michael McGoldrick and John Doyle to form a new group named Usher's Island (a reference to the Dublin quay).

== Etymology ==
"Planxty" was a word used by people who named works by harper Turlough O'Carolan after his death, and is believed to denote a tribute to a particular person: "Planxty Irwin," for example, would be in honour of Colonel John Irwin of Sligo. "Planxty" is thought to be a corruption of the Irish word and popular toast "sláinte", meaning "good health." Another possible explanation is that it is derived from the Latin planctus, a medieval lament composed in honour of a deceased person or a tragic event; also suggested is Ancient Greek πλαγκτός (planktos, "wandering, roaming.")

Regardless of its origin, the name, which replaced the provisional "CLAD" (Christy – Liam – Andy – Dónal), turned out to be a good fit, as O'Carolan's music would play an important part in the band's repertoire. (see "Influences", below).

== Influences ==
A formative influence on Planxty, and in particular on Moore, was the singing of Irish Traveller John "Jacko" Reilly who hailed from Boyle, County Roscommon. It was from Reilly that Moore learned "Raggle Taggle Gypsy", which was recorded for the first Planxty album, in addition to "The Well Below the Valley," which appeared on The Well Below the Valley. Moore later dipped into Reilly's songbook again for an updated version of the lengthy ballad "Lord Baker," which was featured on Planxty's 1983 album Words & Music. ("Baker" appears to be a mondegreen for the "Beichan" of earlier versions.) Reilly died in 1969 at the age of 44, shortly after being found beneath his coats in the top room of his dwelling in Boyle by Tom Munnelly, who had originally collected his songs for archiving.

The music of Turlough O'Carolan appeared on a number of Planxty albums (including the B-side of their very first single), played by O'Flynn on the pipes. Much of this music first came to the attention of the band through the work of seminal Irish composer Seán Ó Riada and his group Ceoltóirí Chualann.

== Members ==
- Dónal Lunny – vocals, bouzouki, guitar, bodhrán, portative organ, blarge (Note: a large bouzouki with an extra B-course made by luthier, Andy Manson), synthesiser, spinnet, dulcimer, bowed psaltery, Prophet synthesizer (1972-1973, 1978-1983, 2003-2005)
- Andy Irvine – vocals, mandolin, mandola, hurdy-gurdy, harmonica, dulcimer (1972-1975, 1978-1983, 2003-2005)
- Liam O'Flynn – uileann pipes, tin whistle (1972-1975, 1978-1983, 2003-2005, died 2018)
- Christy Moore – vocals, guitar, harmonica, bodhrán (1972-1975, 1978-1983, 2003-2005)
- Johnny Moynihan – vocals, bouzouki, fiddle, tin whistle (1973-1975)
- Paul Brady – vocals, guitar, mandolin, bouzouki, tin whistle (1974-1975)
- Matt Molloy – flute, tin whistle (1978-1979, 1980)
- Noel Hill – concertina (1980)
- Tony Linnane – fiddle (1980)
- Bill Whelan – keyboards (1980-1983)
- Nollaig Casey – fiddle (1980-1983)

== Discography ==
=== Studio albums ===
- 1973: Planxty
- 1973: The Well Below the Valley
- 1974: Cold Blow and the Rainy Night
- 1979: After the Break
- 1980: The Woman I Loved So Well
- 1983: Words & Music

=== Live Albums ===
- 1987: The Best of Planxty Live – a two-cassette live album compiled from shows at Olympia Theatre in Dublin, 18–23 August 1980. The unauthorized release by their former manager Kevin Flynn (PLANX MC01), was stopped by a court injunction.
- 2004: Live 2004
- 2018: One Night in Bremen - Recorded by Radio Bremen on April 24th, 1979 at University of Bremen.

=== Anthologies ===
- 1976: The Planxty Collection—Includes "The Cliffs of Dooneen"
- 1984: Planxty Arís–Released in Ireland only; includes "The Cliffs Of Dooneen" and "Yarmouth Town."
- 2016: Between the Jigs and the Reels: A Retrospective (Universal Music Ireland CD/DVD LC01846)—A two-disc anthology, comprising a 17-track CD and a 36-track DVD with over two hours of previously unreleased footage (1972-1982) from RTÉ archives, of live recordings from the Abbey Tavern, the National Stadium, and Live on Aisling Ghael Special

=== Compilations ===
- 1973: Kertalg 73: 2ème Festival Pop'Celtic (France – Barclay CPF 920 452 LP)—Contains live recordings from the festival on 22 July 1973 of "Si Bheag Si Mhor", "Jig", "Raggle Taggle Gypsy"
- 1980: Nyon Folk Festival (France – Cat Music CAT 81004/05 LP)—Contains live recordings from the festival in July 1979 of "Raggle Taggle Gypsy" and "Smeceno Horo"
- 1980: High Kings of Tara (Ireland – TARA 3003)—Irish-only V/A; includes then-exclusive Planxty tracks "Lord McDonald"/"The Chattering Magpie" and "The Bonny Light Horseman" (subsequently added to the CD and digital releases of After The Break); also includes previously unreleased Andy Irvine / Dónal Lunny track, "General Monroe", as well as the Planxty set: "First Slip"/"Hardyman The Fiddler A & B"/"The Yellow Wattle".
- 1986: Irish Folk Festival (Sound CD 8)—Dutch-only CD; includes "Timedance" and "Nancy Spain"
- 1992: The Seville Suite (Tara CD 3030) – credited to Bill Whelan, features exclusive Planxty reunion studio track "Timedance '92"
- 2004: Christy Moore: The Box Set 1964–2004—Includes an early live recording of "The Raggle Taggle Gypsy" live at City Hall, Cork; "Three Drunken Maidens", and the previously unreleased Planxty outtake "Down In The Valley".

=== Singles ===
- 1972: "Three Drunken Maidens"/"Sí Bheag, Sí Mhór" – 7" single (Ruby 152)
- 1972: "Cliffs of Dooneen"/"Yarmouth Town" – 7" single (Polydor 2078–023)
- 1981: "Timedance"/"Nancy Spain" – 7" single (WEA IR 18711 / UK K 18711)
- 1981: "Timedance"/"Nancy Spain" – 12" single (WEA IR 28207)
- 1983: "I Pity the Poor Immigrant"/"The Irish Marche" – 7" single (WEA PLAN01)

=== With Christy Moore ===
- 1971: Prosperous (Trailer LER 3035 LP) – Christy's second solo album in the village where the members of Planxty first came together.
- 1983: "Easter Snow" / "The Knock Song" (WEA IR 9591 45)—7" single, with Planxty members on "Easter Snow". Republished on The Christy Moore Collection 1981–1991
- 1985: Ordinary Man (WEA 0706 & WEA 0763 LP) – Planxty featured on the track "St. Brendan's Voyage"

== Filmography ==
- Planxty Live 2004 (2004), DVD
- Come West Along the Road Vol. 1 (2005), DVD
- Come West Along the Road Vol. 2 (2007), DVD
- Come West Along the Road Vol. 3 (2010), DVD
- Between the Jigs and the Reels: A Retrospective (2016), DVD

== Bibliography ==
- Huntington, Gale; Herrmann, Lani; Moulden, John, eds. (2010). Sam Henry's Songs of the People. Athens, GA and London: The University of Georgia Press. ISBN 08-2033-625-4.
- Irvine, Andy (1988). Aiming For The Heart (1st ed.). Germany: Heupferd Musik Verlag GmbH. ISBN 39-2344-501-6.
- Irvine, Andy (2008) [First published 1988]. Aiming For The Heart: Irish Song Affairs (2nd expanded ed.). Germany: Heupferd Musik Verlag GmbH. ISBN 978-3-92-344505-9.
- Irwin, Colin (2003). In Search of the Craíc. London: André Deutsch. ISBN 02-3300-004-6.
- Moore, Christy (2000). One Voice: My Life In Song. London: Lir/Hodder and Stoughton. ISBN 03-4076-839-8.
- Moore, Christy (2003) [First published 2000]. One Voice (2nd revised ed.). London: Lir/Hodder and Stoughton. ISBN 978-0-340-83073-4.
- Ó Callanain, Niall; Walsh, Tommy (1989). The Irish Bouzouki. Ireland: Waltons. ISBN 07-8661-595-8.
- O'Toole, Leagues (2006). The Humours of Planxty. Dublin: Hodder Headline. ISBN 03-4083-796-9.
- Planxty (Songbook) (1976). London: Mews Music.
