= Mellow Candle =

Irish progressive folk rock band (1968–1973)

Background information
- Origin: Ireland
- Genres: Folk rock, progressive folk
- Years active: 1968–1973
- Labels: Deram, ACME Gramophone Company
- Members: Clodagh Simonds; Alison Bools (later O'Donnell); Maria White; David Williams; Frank Boylan; William Murray; Steve Borrill

Mellow Candle was an Irish progressive folk rock band, active from 1968 to 1973. They released one studio album, Swaddling Songs, in 1972. A collection of demos and sessions for the album, recorded 1969–1971, was released in 1996 as The Virgin Prophet.

== History ==
At the time of their first single, "Feelin' High", released in 1968 on Simon Napier-Bell's Snb (2) Records, founding band members Clodagh Simonds, Alison Bools and Maria White were teenagers at high school. After leaving school Maria drifted away, and after a brief hiatus the band re-formed with an expanded line-up including Dave Williams (guitar), Frank Boylan (bass) and William Murray (drums). In 1972 the band released Swaddling Songs, which was commercially unsuccessful at the time.

Boylan was subsequently replaced by Steve Borrill (ex-Spirogyra).

The band split up in 1973.

Swaddling Songs has since received critical acclaim and original vinyl copies are highly collectable. It has been re-released multiple times on various labels since 1989, including a 50th anniversary release by Deram in 2023.

In 2022 the album's 50th anniversary was marked by the RTE radio documentary Swaddling Songs at 50.

== Members ==
Mellow Candle c.1967

- Clodagh Simonds – lead vocals, backing vocals, piano, harpsichord, mellotron
- Alison Bools (later Williams, later O'Donnell) – lead vocals, backing vocals
- David Williams – guitar, backing vocals
- Frank Boylan – bass guitar, backing vocals (replaced by Steve Borrill)
- William Murray – drums, percussion

== Discography ==
=== Albums ===
- Swaddling Songs (Deram SDL 7, 1972)
- The Virgin Prophet, demos and sessions for Swaddling Songs recorded 1969–1971, released 1996 (Kissing Spell KSF004)

=== Singles ===
- "Feeling High" / "Tea With The Sun" (Snb (2) 55–3645, 1968)
- "Dan The Wing" / "Silversong" (Deram DM 357, 1972)

== After Mellow Candle ==
In the years immediately following the band's dissolution, Simonds worked with Thin Lizzy, Jade Warrior, and Mike Oldfield. Boylan played with Gary Moore, while Murray, who had previously worked with Kevin Ayers (Whatevershebringswesing, 1971), contributed to albums by Amazing Blondel, Mike Oldfield, and Paul Kossoff. Steve Borrill and William Murray toured with Richard and Linda Thompson.

Williams and Bools, who married in 1972, moved to South Africa, forming the band Flibbertigibbet which released the album Whistling Jigs To The Moon.

In 1991, the Swaddling Songs track "Silversong" was covered (as "Silver Song") by All About Eve as a B-side to some versions of their single "Farewell Mr. Sorrow".

1996 saw the release of The Virgin Prophet, a collection of previously unreleased material by the band, including demos of many of the songs on Swaddling Songs. Some of these sessions featured Richard Coughlan of Caravan on drums, although his sessions do not feature on the album.

In 1999, Simonds recorded a version of Syd Barrett's setting of the James Joyce poem "Golden Hair" for Russell Mills' album, Pearl and Umbra.

In 2002 Simonds established her own label Janet Records, and the loose collective Fovea Hex, which released a number of recordings featuring Brian Eno, Roger Eno, film composer Carter Burwell, Andrew McKenzie of the Hafler Trio, Steven Wilson, Colin Potter (of Nurse With Wound), Robert Fripp, Percy Jones, Michael Begg, Laura Sheeran, Cora Venus Lunny, Roger Doyle, cellist Kate Ellis and others. She has also appeared on recordings by Current 93, Matmos, Steven Wilson, and Brian Eno.

In 2003, Steven Malkmus included a live version of the Swaddling Songs track "Poet & The Witch" on a bonus CD accompanying his album Pig Lib.

In 2006, O'Donnell was reunited with Dave Williams and Frank Boylan on the album Mise Agus Ise. She followed this with the 2008 EP The Fabric of Folk, a collaboration with English folk/rock band The Owl Service, and her debut solo album Hey Hey Hippy Witch (Floating World, 2009). Subsequently, she continued to release a wide variety of mostly collaborative recordings.
