= Svetlana Smolina =

Concert pianist

Svetlana Smolina is a Concert pianist.

== Early life and education ==
Smolina is a recipient of the “New Names” scholarship program in Russia., and has a DMA from the University of Michigan, as well as an MM, BM and Artist Diplomas from Indiana University South Bend, Oberlin Conservatory, Brussels Royal Conservatory and Balakirev Music College.

== Career ==
Smolina has performed with orchestras such as Mariinsky Orchestra at Carnegie Hall, New York Philharmonic at Avery Fisher, St.Petersburg Philharmonic, Orchestra National de France, Odessa and Nizhny Novgorod Philharmonic, Pittsburgh Symphony, New Florida Philharmonic, Shreveport Symphony, and New York Chamber Orchestra. She has performed at venues including Salzburg Festival, Hollywood Bowl, Ravinia Rising Stars, White Nights, Maggio Musicale, Mikkeli, Ruhr, Easter, Rotterdam Phillips Gergiev, International Gilmore, Settimane Musicali di Stresa and many others.

Later recordings include Stravinsky's Igor Stravinsky Les noces (Valery Gergiev, conductor on Decca/Phillips and on Mariinsky Label which received the ICMA award for Best Choral Work in 2011), a recording of solo Chopin Album for the Chopin iTunes Project, Benjamin Britten Young Apollo live recording from Walt Disney Hall for BCM+D records and broadcasts for NPR, BBC, PBS, RAI, Cultura TV and other networks.

In the summer of 2011, Smolina joined iPalpiti Festival of International Laureates in Los Angeles, making her debut at Walt Disney Concert Hall with iPalpiti Orchestra (Eduard Schmieder, conductor). Since 2011, Smolina is directing the piano program at Philadelphia International Music Festival. In 2014, she was appointed as Artist in Residence in Temple University's Esther Boyer College of Music and Dance, in the Department of Instrumental Studies.

In 2014, Smolina won the "Live on Stage” live showcases and was chosen as their only Classical Pianist Artist for the 2015–16 season US tour of more than 20 states. Other collaborations include a series of concerts with Robert Davi and Dave Konig at Eisenhower Park, Harry Chapin Lakeside Theater.

In 2014-15 Vadim Repin gave a series of concerts /presentation with Smolina at the residence of the Ambassador of Russia in Washington, D.C. and in London UK for Maestro Repin's Trans-Siberian Art Festival. In March 2015 they performed a recital at Koerner Hall in Toronto, Canada, and, in July 2015, they performed a recital as part of "2015 – Russian Year in Monaco" in the Salle Garnier, Monte-Carlo Opera.

In the 2015–16 season, Smolina opened the season with Orquesta Sinfonica Nacional Juvenil in Lima, Peru, and was chosen as the soloist on the New Year tour to China with the Dublin Philharmonic (conductor Derek Gleeson) performing a Rachmaninoff Concerto in seven cities including Suzhou Grand Theater, Harbin New Opera House and Harbin Concert Hall, Wuhan Qintai Concert Hall, Tianjin Grand Theater and in Changsha opening its new Concert Hall.

Highlights of 2016-2017 included performances and recordings at the inauguration year/ opening of Tippet Rise Festival in Montana together with Christopher O'Riley with a CD released on Pentatone Oxingale Records in July 2017. This was followed by duo recitals with Vadim Repin at Cartagena Music Festival in Teatro Colón, Bogota for “2017 Colombia- France Year”, then, in Bangalore, Mumbai India, for XXV Lakshminarayana Global Music Festival, at Teatro Lirico di Cagliari in Sardinia, Italy. Then came a Carnegie Hall recital with Lee-Chin Siow, Sentosa World Theater in Singapore concert for International Women Day/Chinese Chamber of Commerce. Smolina then performed with the South Florida Symphony (conductor Sebrina Alfonso) in Florida, and, in 2017, she performed at a number of concerts including a recital in Buenos Aires, Argentina at “The Best Pianists of the 21st Century “ series.
