= Adam Leonard =

Adam Leonard may refer to:

- Adam Leonard (singer-songwriter), English singer-songwriter
- Adam Leonard (gridiron football) (born 1986), American gridiron football linebacker
