= From the Outside =

From the Outside may refer to:

== Albums ==
- From the Outside (Bert Jansch album), a 1985 album and its title track by Bert Jansch
- From the Outside (Hey Violet album), a 2017 album by Hey Violet

== Songs ==
- "From the Outside", a song by All That Remains from the 2010 album For We Are Many
- "From the Outside", a 2018 song by Real Friends
