= Tadhg Cooke =

Irish musician

Tiger Cooke
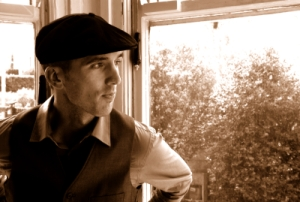
- Tadhg Cooke

Background information
- Born: Tadhg Cooke
- Origin: Dublin, Ireland
- Genres: Soulful folk noir, Dark folk, indie rock
- Years active: 2005 – present
- Labels: Ivy Court Records, Vivo Discs (Japan)
- Website: www.tigercooke.com

Tadhg Cooke is an Irish musician, also known by his stage name "Tiger Cooke".

Born in Dublin, Ireland and raised in Dunboyne, County Meath, he showed musical promise from an early age and began writing his own music in school.

He obtained a degree in Computational Linguistics from Dublin City University in 2002, but chose to pursue a career in music. Sparks from his debut release, The Sparks EP, was A-listed on the alternative rock station Phantom FM.

Tadhg has supported the likes of Damien Dempsey, Damien Rice, and Bell X1 over the past number of years and begun to establish himself on the Irish music scene. His single Know You Hate Me made it to number 88 in the Irish airplay charts. In addition, he has made several TV appearances on RTÉ. He appeared at the 2006 Electric Picnic in Stradbally, Co Laois, with David Geraghty's Bell X1 solo project which also featured renowned violinist Cora Venus Lunny, vocalist Clare Finglass, double-bassist Dave Redmond, drummer Kevin Brady (both from the Kevin Brady Trio who have toured Ireland with Bill Carothers, Maria Tecce, The Phil Ware Trio, etc.) David's first solo album, Kill Your Darlings, was nominated for the Choice Music Prize. The follow-up, The Victory Dance, was released on 28 August 2009.

== Wax & Seal ==
He began work on his first full album in Freiburg, Germany in 2004, and the result, Wax and Seal, was released to positive reviews in 2005. The Irish Times described it as "Eminently likeable. (4/5)", whilst Hot Press described it as "a confident, impressive debut".

Wax and Seal was released in Japan by Vivo Discs in November 2006.

== Fingertips of the Silversmith ==
Cooke teamed up with bassist David Redmond and drummer Kevin Brady in early 2010 to arrange songs for what would become "Fingertips of the Silversmith". This album, produced by David Geraghty, was released independently in Ireland on 22 October 2010, under the new name of "Tiger Cooke". Tadhg found that as an independent act without a huge marketing budget, "Tiger" would be an easier name to use in foreign markets (and even at home), especially in an age when the internet and internet searches are so important. The new name is one less barrier between the music and the listener. "Fingertips of the Silversmith" was described as "a dreamy, understated collection of Americana-tinged folk-rock, marked out by Cooke’s poetic sensibility and keen eye for life’s absurdities" and given 4 stars by The Sunday Business Post; while GoldenPlec described it as "One of the strongest albums an Irish artist has come out with this year". The album was released under a Creative Commons licence (BY-NC-ND).
