= The Owl Service (band) =

English band

- Origin: England
- Genres: Alternative folk, indie folk
- Years active: 2006–present
- Members: Steven Collins; Dorothy Chappell; Rebecca Leivers
- Past members: Dom Cooper; Katie English; Jo Lepine; Jason Steel; Nancy Wallace; Diana Collier; Mark Offord; Kate Waterfield; Daniel Forbes; Bryan Styles

The Owl Service is an English alternative folk music collective formed in 2006 by multi-instrumentalist Steven Paul Collins (who has led the band for its entire duration), named after the 1967 novel by Alan Garner.

== History ==
The Owl Service began as a studio-based solo project for Steven Collins in June 2006. While working on the first Owl Service release (the Wake the Vaulted Echo EP from 2006), he met Dom Cooper, of The Straw Bear Band, who was drafted in to provide lead vocals on the song "The Two Magicians". Dom remained involved with The Owl Service until March 2012, singing, writing songs, and coordinating the band's graphic design. The Wake the Vaulted Echo EP was warmly received in psych-folk circles, which led to Collins being asked to record a track for the 2007 compilation album John Barleycorn Reborn on the Cold Spring label (for which he also contributed sleeve notes). For John Barleycorn Reborn, Steven recorded the traditional song "The North Country Maid" with session singer Rachel Davies, a song he would revisit on the debut album in an alternative version. While recording the debut Owl Service album, the singers Jo Lepine and Diana Collier became permanent members of the band.

The debut album, A Garland of Song, was released on Collins' own Hobby-Horse micro-label in July 2007 as a handmade CD-r limited to 100 copies. Collins arranged, recorded and mixed the album himself at home, also providing almost all of the instrumentation. This model is how the collective operate to this day: Collins selects and arranges the songs, recording everything at home, then brings in singers and occasionally extra instrumental players to complete the tracks. Often Collins would record vocals and other parts on location if the musicians weren't able to make it to his home studio in Essex. Soon after the release of the debut album, Collins expanded the line-up to enable them to function as a live group. This was when Nancy Wallace (formerly of The Memory Band) became a permanent member of the band. By the end of 2007 Collins had signed to UK independent label Southern Records. It was not an obvious label choice for a folk band, but Collins felt a certain kinship with Tony Sylvester (who handled Southern Records' A&R at the time) as, like Collins himself, Tony was passionate about both heavy metal and the 1960s English folk revival. The other deciding factor was that two of Collins' favourite records of all time were by the Chicago band 90 Day Men, who were also signed to Southern Records.

Southern reissued A Garland of Song in June 2008 on CD and LP, followed a month later by an EP on the Static Caravan label recorded with ex-Mellow Candle singer Alison O'Donnell entitled The Fabric of Folk. By this time the band had a core line-up of 7 with the addition of Jason Steel (guitar, banjo, vocals), and experimental musician Katie English (a.k.a. Isnaj Dui) providing flute and melodica. Keen to return to his DIY roots, Collins parted company with Southern Records at the end of 2009 and immediately began a series of new Owl Service releases collectively titled The Pattern Beneath the Plough. The second full-length Owls album, The View From a Hill, was released on 1 May 2010 and was the centrepiece of the Pattern series. The album featured guest appearances from Joolie Wood (of Current 93) and Alison O'Donnell, among others.

December 2011 saw the release of a two-track 7" vinyl single comprising "The Standing Stones" and "The Red Barn", a traditional ballad based on the Red Barn Murder and this was followed by another 7" release, entitled There Used to be a Crown, which included cover versions of four songs originally by Tom Rapp/Pearls Before Swine.

At the start of 2012, Steven Collins put The Owl Service on an indefinite hiatus and immediately began working on two new projects. The first was Greanvine, a duo with fellow Owl Service member Diana Collier, who played a mix of traditional songs and cover versions in stark, electric arrangements; the second was Country Parish Music, a project closer to the sound of The Owl Service. Collins also formed a new label, Stone Tape Recordings, named after the Nigel Kneale television play from 1972. The first two releases on Stone Tape Recordings were by The Owl Service: a data DVD entitled She Wants to be Flowers, But You Make Her Owls, which collected mp3 files of every track the band had released at that point plus a wealth of unreleased material, artwork files, and video recordings; and the album Garland Sessions, which included all 13 songs from the debut album re-mixed and partially re-recorded along with 6 additional tracks.

In October 2013 Collins publicly hinted via Facebook that a new Owl Service record was in production and that the band would be making a return to the live stage in December. The December concert in Leigh-on-sea, their first live performance in over 18 months, saw Collins reunited with Jo Lepine, Diana Collier and Nancy Wallace. The band regrouped again 6 months later for two more shows; the first was again in Leigh-on-sea, where they were joined by frequent collaborator Alison O'Donnell, and the second was in London at a fund-raising event for the feature-length Shirley Collins documentary film.

October 2014 brought forth the first new Owl Service record since the Garland Sessions album in 2012; a low-key EP to mark Halloween entitled Three Inverted Nines, which featured cover versions of four songs written by musician Glenn Danzig. At the end of 2014 after 18 releases Stone Tape Recordings closed down. The reason Collins cited for the closure was the huge workload which was keeping him from recording new Owl Service material. In September 2014 another concert was announced, this time in London at an event organised by Collins to celebrate the 100th birthday of US folk song collector Alan Lomax. The concert, held the following January at Asylum in Peckham, was their last for over 5 years.

Free from the constraints of running a label, in January 2015 Collins confirmed that the new Owl Service album, entitled His Pride. No Spear. No Friend., would be released before the end of the year. The album eventually saw the light of day on 31 October 2015 and was something of a departure from previous Owl Service releases. According to Collins, "The album is mostly traditional songs, but the sound is far from traditional. It's a folk album in lyrical content only, not in sound". Ultimately, Collins' fierce anti-industry/pro-DIY stance would prove to be his downfall as the band flew below the radar of most people and the album was both a critical and commercial failure, being either met with total indifference or completely ignored. Collins likened the task of promoting His Pride. No Spear. No Friend. to "flogging a dead horse whilst banging my head against a brick wall". His exasperation was compounded by his belief that the album was his finest work to date, and the pinnacle of what he'd set out to achieve with The Owl Service 10 years earlier. The album was almost entirely a one-man project, with Collins arranging, recording, mixing and mastering the audio, performing everything except the vocals, and creating the artwork. To see the album fail proved to be the final straw and soon after its release Steven Collins announced that The Owl Service would cease to exist on the band's 10th anniversary on 6 June 2016.

After 5 years in exile, Collins returned to revive the band in June 2021. A new EP, Rise Up Rise Up, was released via the band's Bandcamp page on June 6, 2021, with a new album project announced at the same time. In October 2021 the band were commissioned by Southend-on-sea's Focal Point Gallery to create an exclusive work, which resulted in the mini-album English Country Music, a set of five new arrangements of songs taken from a book of folk songs collected in Essex entitled Bushes & Briars. The FPG commission was performed in full by the band at the 2022 Leigh Folk Festival. One more show in 2022 (again, in Leigh-on-sea) was followed by a return to the Leigh Folk Festival the following year, which brought that phase of the band to a close. In 2024 Collins began a series of three releases which came under the banner of Black Chapel Music, which saw him experimenting with electronic instruments, loops and samples. On the third instalment, Collins returned to folk song, recording an arrangement of the traditional song "The Garden Gate" (with folk singer Liz Overs) and an original Peter Bellamy song ("Above the Hill"). In April 2025 the line-up was expanded to include two new singers, Rebecca Leivers and Dorothy Chappell, and a string of new releases began to surface, starting with a two-track single recorded in tribute to Sandy Denny. This was followed by another single, "All You Maids & Gentlemen", and an EP of Anne Briggs songs entitled Will the Waters Hold My Burden (released on both CD and clear vinyl lathe-cut 7"). In August of 2025 Collins announced that the next Owl Service album was scheduled for release in early 2026 and would be titled Tied to the Land.

== Personnel ==
- Steven Collins – electric, acoustic and bass guitars, banjo, vocals, keyboards, drones, percussion, drums, synths, recording, mixing, mastering (2006-present)
- Dorothy Chappell – vocals (2025-present)
- Rebecca Leivers – vocals (2025-present)
- Diana Collier – vocals (2007-2023)
- Mark Offord – bass guitar (2010-2023)
- Kate Waterfield – vocals, viola (2007, 2021-2023)
- Daniel Forbes – guitar, vocals (2021-2023)
- Bryan Styles – drums, percussion, vocals (2021-2023)
- Dom Cooper – vocals (2007-2012)
- Katie English – flute, percussion (2008-2012)
- Jo Lepine – vocals (2007-2016)
- Jason Steel – acoustic guitar, banjo, vocals (2008-2012)
- Nancy Wallace – acoustic guitar, concertina, vocals (2007-2016)

Occasional members of the collective on record and/or as part of the live band include Alison O'Donnell, Joolie Wood, Martyn Kember-Smith, Rebsie Fairholm, Pamela Wyn Shannon, Mark Patterson, Simon Green, Simon Sparrow, Adam Leonard, Laura Hulse, Michelle Bappoo, Roshi Nasehi, Matthew Boulter, Emma Reed, and Magnus Dearness.

== Discography ==
=== EPs & Singles ===
- Wake the Vaulted Echo (CD-r) (2006) (Hobby-Horse)
- Cine (CD-r) (2006) (Hobby-Horse)
- Cine (The Director's Cut) (CD) (2007) (Static Caravan)
- The Fabric of Folk (CD) (2008) (Static Caravan)
- The Bitter Night EP (Lathe-cut 7") (2008) (Hobby-Horse)
- The Fabric of Folk (12") (2009) (Midwich)
- Tigon Session (CD-r) (2009) (Midwich)
- The Burn Comes Down (CD) (2010) (Rif Mountain)
- All Things Being Silent (7") (2011) (Rif Mountain)
- There Used to be a Crown (7") (2012) (Hobby-Horse)
- Bare Ghosts (CD-r) (2013) (Stone Tape Recordings)
- Three Inverted Nines (CD-r) (2014) (Horn Records)
- Jean (CD-r) (2015) (Horn Records)
- The Fabric of Folk (redux edition) (CD-r) (2015) (Horn Records)
- Tracing Patterns (CD-r) (2016) (Horn Records)
- Rise Up Rise Up (CD-r) (2021) (Hobby-Horse)
- English Country Music (CD-r) (2023) (Hobby-Horse)
- Black Chapel Music part 1: The Stone Tape (Download) (2024) (Hobby-Horse)
- Black Chapel Music part 2: A Call to Prayer / Unfurling (Download) (2024) (Hobby-Horse)
- Black Chapel Music part 3: The Garden Gate / Above the Hill (7" & Download) (2025) (Hobby-Horse)
- A Tribute to Sandy Denny (CD-r & Download) (2025) (Hobby-Horse)
- Hail the Queen of the May (Download) (2025) (Hobby-Horse)
- Will the Waters Hold my Burden (Download, CD & 7") (2025) (Hobby-Horse / Future Grave)

=== Albums ===
- A Garland of Song (original) (CD-r) (2007) (Hobby-Horse)
- A Garland of Song (reissue) (CD & LP) (2008) (Southern Records)
- The View From a Hill (CD) (2010) (Rif Mountain)
- Garland Sessions (CD) (2012) (Stone Tape Recordings)
- His Pride. No Spear. No Friend. (CD & LP) (2016) (Horn Records)

=== Compilations ===
- The Petrifying Well (CD-r) (2008) (Midwich)
- The Pattern Beneath The Plough Parts 1 + 2 (2011) (Rif Mountain) - 2 CDs; CD 1 = The Burn Comes Down plus 7 bonus tracks; CD 2 = The View From A Hill plus 2 bonus tracks
- She Wants to be Flowers But You Make Her Owls (Data DVD) (2012) (Stone Tape Recordings) - data DVD containing every Owl Service release
- She Wants to be Flowers But You Make Her Owls (reissue) (Data DVD) (2014) (Horn Records) - data DVD containing every Owl Service release and 17-track CD compilation
- The Wolf in Every Mind (Data DVD) (2016) (Horn Records) - updated version of She Wants to Be Flowers on data DVD and download
- Swearing on the Horns (2 CDs) (2021) (Hobby-Horse) - collection of 7 out-of-print EPs + 2 compilation-only tracks
