= Alison O'Donnell (musician) =

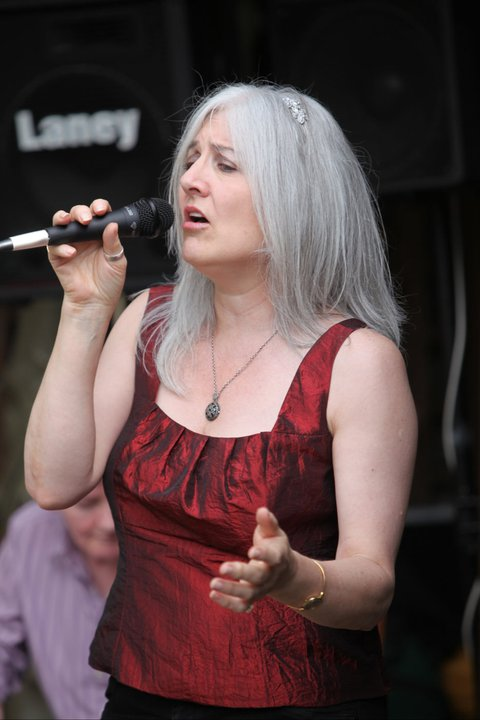
- O'Donnell on stage at The Wishing Well Gig in The Garden, Blackrock, Dublin, July 2010

Background information
- Also known as: Alison Leigh, Alison Williams, Assie O'Donnell
- Born: Alison Felicity Bools; 5 October 1952 (age 73); Dublin, Ireland
- Genres: Folk; folk rock; psychedelic folk; traditional Irish; jazz
- Instruments: Voice, bodhrán, percussion, autoharp
- Years active: 1963 to present
- Labels: Deram Records, Stanyan Records, Kissing Spell Records, Osmosys Records, Static Caravan Recordings, Fruits de Mer Records, Floating World Records
- Website: alisonodonnell.com

Alison O'Donnell (born 5 October 1952) is an Irish musician, solo and band singer-songwriter. Born Alison Bools in Dublin to an English mother and Irish father, raised in Dalkey and educated at Holy Child Killiney.

== Biography ==
=== Childhood ===
O'Donnell grew up in Dalkey and Killiney in south County Dublin, where she had a daily view of Dalkey Island (which was to provide inspiration for song writing in her teens and early 20s). Ballet and sporting activities were early interests until the age of 11 when music became her abiding passion. Her commitment was sealed when she took Cecilia as her Confirmation name (Saint Cecilia being the Patron saint of musicians). At the age of 11 she co-founded the progressive folk rock band Mellow Candle with school friends Clodagh Simonds and Maria White. They released their first single, Feeling High on SNB Records (Simon Napier-Bell) in 1968.

=== Early career ===
On leaving school, O'Donnell attended Art College in Dún Laoghaire (now Dún Laoghaire Institute of Art, Design and Technology) and briefly joined Blue Tint, a covers band, where she met her first husband, guitarist Dave Williams, who was studying at Trinity College Dublin. This was followed by a secretarial course and employment until a full electric line-up of Mellow Candle reformed. The band lived and worked in Ireland and England between 1969 and 1973 managed by Thin Lizzy manager, Ted Carroll. O'Donnell and Williams spent their wedding evening in concert with Thin Lizzy at the National Stadium in Dublin. Bob Geldof, Luke Kelly and members of Clannad were amongst early spectators at Irish concerts, and several members of the group participated in house sessions with pioneering traditional musicians, Dónal Lunny and Andy Irvine. The band released their latterly highly acclaimed, cult album, Swaddling Songs on Decca Records's Deram subsidiary in 1972.

The untimely and unhappy demise of Mellow Candle and the tough economic climate of the Three-Day Week in 1973/74 London sent O'Donnell and Williams to Johannesburg, South Africa. Simonds and Murray ultimately went to New York, and Boylan joined The Gary Moore Band for a time. In the year before their departure they played Belgian bars as a folk duo and formed a short-lived band with guitarist Jimmy Faulkner, who died in 2008. Disenchanted by hard drug use backstage, they abandoned the project. Two years after their arrival in South Africa the couple participated in Palet, an Afrikaans music and poetry programme in 1976 for the fledgling South African Broadcasting Corporation's television service. The show was considered too radical and highbrow, and never aired, resulting in the producer's resignation. They formed traditional group Flibbertigibbet in 1977 with Barrie Glenn and Jo Dudding whom they met at Mangles Folk Club. The band recorded their vinyl album, Whistling Jigs to the Moon in 1978 in South Africa for a slim, niche market, and made several appearances on SATV. The recording was more fully appreciated and reissued in 1996.

After the break-up of Flibbertigibbet in 1979 O'Donnell worked as a session singer for singer-songwriters and advertising agency recordings, toured in the musical I'm Getting My Act Together and Taking It on the Road produced by Des and Dawn Lindberg, and performed in a series of satirical revues in 1980/81 with South African actors and musicians: Tortue Revues I and II in Rockey Street's famed 80s clubs, and Fool Marks and Commit No Nuisance at the Chelsea Hotel Hillbrow with music by David Marks (songwriter, producer and archivist), who had earlier given Flibbertigibbet their first run at The Market Theatre in Johannesburg. In the early to mid-80s O'Donnell appeared briefly with jazz group Theta and an early incarnation of the popular rock group Ella Mental at Sun City. She recorded an album with writer/producer Terry Dempsey's band, Plastik Mak, which included his hit song Daydreamer and performed in after-show cabaret with musician/actress Michelle Maxwell and on the folk club stage with blues/folk guitarist Mike Dickman. She also appeared regularly with singer-songwriters Colin Shamley and Roger Lucey, guesting on their respective albums. During this period she assisted in running the door for Club Le Chaim, which featured musicians opposed to the Apartheid regime. In the year before she departed Johannesburg for London in early 1986, O'Donnell co-wrote the repertoire and performed with contemporary jazz group Earthlings at night. By day she worked for South African Associated Newspapers, which at that time included The Rand Daily Mail and The Sunday Times.

=== Later music career ===
Between 1986 and 1996 O'Donnell worked in public sector administration in London. At this time interest in Mellow Candle was gathering pace. The pre-drums demos were released as The Virgin Prophet and the re-mastered Swaddling Songs has been reissued on vinyl and CD regularly since then. In 2006 a Mojo magazine poll Beyond Folk the group was listed in the top 50 genre-bending folk classics of the last forty years. The band features in a number of Top Ten lists in Galactic Ramble (a complete study of 60s and 70s music in the UK). Tracks are regularly licensed out to compilations, amongst them, O'Donnell's Messenger Birds for The Story of British Folk (a double CD collection covering British folk music from the early 60s to modern day contemporaries), the co-written Sheep Season on Early Morning Hush, Notes from the Folk Underground 1969–1976, and Heaven Heath on Legends of Ireland. In 2007 an original vinyl copy of Swaddling Songs sold to a Canadian eBay bidder for $2,650.

In 1997 after leaving an administrative post with the London School of Economics, O'Donnell moved to Brussels, working with jazz and folk musicians, in pantomime, and giving voice coaching lessons and workshops. O'Donnell's own vocal training had included a period at the Leinster School of Music & Drama in Dublin in her teens, in Johannesburg during the mid-1970s for a six-month period with a teacher specialising in syncopation, and a further three months with a former opera singer. Traditional group Éishtlinn was formed by O'Donnell with Flemish guitarist Philip Masure in 1998. The band played in Belgium, France, Luxembourg and the Netherlands, releasing the album, Éist Linn in 2001.

O'Donnell returned to Ireland in 2001 but continued to work with three Flemish women singers in French, Flemish and English in the band Oeda, which came joint second in the nationwide Belgian band competition Nekka-contest 2001–2002. Soetkin Collier, of Oeda, is more frequently associated with the Belgian folk group Urban Trad, who finished second in the Eurovision Song Contest 2003.

O'Donnell's repatriation after 28 years away from the Irish music scene meant that she had to embark on a steep learning curve. She sings and plays bodhrán in sessions, festivals, gigs and charity events in Ireland and abroad, mostly collaborating with other artists. O'Donnell and a male entrant won a medal each for a "Newly Composed Song in English" at the Dublin Fleadh in 2004, they being the only two entrants in the category that year. Aside from her concert repertoire of original psych folk and trad rock songs, she has a wide repertoire of traditional, folk and jazz songs. She is a member of An Góilín (a traditional singers' club) TAC (Traditional Arts Collective) and was part of the Howth Singing Circle. With instrumentalist Isabel Ní Chuireáin, she released the album Mise agus Ise in 2006.

From 2007 there were collaborations and contributions to recordings with Dave Colohan of Agitated Radio Pilot, Canadian psych folk band, Mr. Pine, Colin Harper's collective The Field Mouse conspiracy and The Guessing Game, the 9th album from the Doom metal band Cathedral. In 2008 O'Donnell featured on a vinyl double A-Side single of Nick Drake's Day is Done and Nico's Frozen Warnings with Graeme Lockett of Head South By Weaving and an EP, The Fabric of Folk, with The Owl Service. They appeared together at the Green Man Festival. O'Donnell and Steven Collins of The Owl Service have collaborated regularly, including on several tracks for her first solo album, Hey Hey Hippy Witch, released in 2010. Other contributors and collaborators on this project are Michael Tyack of the psychedelic folk rock band Circulus, Kevin Scott of Mr. Pine, Head South By Weaving and Gavin Prior and Dave Colohan of United Bible Studies. In 2008 O'Donnell became a member of United Bible Studies, an experimental psych folk collective which draws on students from a number of countries and has contributed to a prolific output of albums and recording projects since that time. She contributed to their 2009 album The Jonah and a UBS/Jozef Van Wissem vinyl album, Downland, in 2011.

O'Donnell is known for her enthusiastic and varied collaborations. Recent work includes Bajik, a live band playing new and recent O'Donnell material formed in 2010, headlining at their maiden concert in Spain at the Datura Folk Festival, a contribution to the album Towards Abstraction by Big Dwarf, a contemporary electronic psychedelic band and a joint album with Head South By Weaving, The Execution of Frederick Baker, both in 2013. Between 2014 and 2015 there has also been a CD and vinyl release with Firefay, British folk noir group.

She appeared on the TV documentary Phil Lynott: Scéalta Ón Old Town, about the making of Phil Lynott's music video for the 1982 song Old Town, first broadcast on RTÉ One on 30 December 2018. In February 2024, she featured in the BBC Two Northern Ireland documentary "Legends of Harper", about Belfast author, musician, songwriter and composer Colin Harper, with whom she has been a long-time collaborator.

=== Personal life ===
O'Donnell married Dave Williams in January 1972 in Dublin and Ian Brower in Johannesburg in January 1986. She has one daughter, Kate Brower, born London 1988. O'Donnell has worked under her mother's maiden name since 1980.

O'Donnell developed an interest in Genealogy in 1996, working extensively on her family tree. This led to an appearance in the BBC Four documentary series Family Ties (a precursor to Who Do You Think You Are?) in 2004. The programme focused on her grandmother Nina, a singer who, long after her death, was revealed to be a secret bigamist with another family living in Scotland (the two branches of the family are now in contact). O'Donnell's musical heritage hails from her English maternal granny, Irish great-grandfather Peter, and her grandfather P.S.G. O'Donnell and his two brothers Rudolph Peter and Bertram Walton, military musicians with distinguished careers with the Royal Marines Band Service during the first half of the twentieth century. O'Donnell is an animal-lover, particularly of cats and dogs. She lives in Dublin.

== Discography ==
=== Albums ===
- Swaddling Songs – Mellow Candle, 1972 (Deram SDL 7)
- Whistling Jigs to the Moon – Flibbertigibbet, 1978 (Stanyan 3EE 7002)
- Love Connection – Plastik Mak, 1980 (Flash Records FL 1001)
- The Virgin Prophet – Mellow Candle, 1996 (Unreleased sessions 1969–1970, Kissing Spell KSCD 9520-F)
- My Lagan Love – Flibbertigibbet, 1998 (live/demos Kissing Spell KSCD 902)
- Éist Linn – Éishtlinn, 2001 (Spiral SCD 925)
- Mise agus Ise – Alison O'Donnell & Isabel Ní Chuireáin, 2006 (Osmosys CD 033)
- The Jonah – United Bible Studies, 2009 (Camera Obscura CAM 084CD)
- Hey Hey Hippy Witch – Alison O'Donnell, 2010 (Floating World FREEM5021)
- Downland – United Bible Studies & Jozef Van Wissem, 2010 (Deserted Village/Incunabulum)
- The Execution of Frederick Baker – Head South By Weaving & Alison O'Donnell, 2012/13 (Ritual Echo Records rerLP007) (Vinyl/CD)
- Doineann – United Bible Studies, 2014 (A Year in the Country)
- Box Social (live 2009) – United Bible Studies, 2014 (Reverb Worship)
- Anointed Queen – Firefay & Alison O'Donnell, 2014 on CD (Stonetape Recordings) and 2015 on vinyl (Golden Pavilion)
- So As To Preserve The Mystery – United Bible Studies, 2015 (Deep Water)
- The Ale's What Cures Ye – United Bible Studies, 2015 (MIE)
- Soregh, Murne & Fast – United Bible Studies, 2015
- Rosary Bleeds – United Bible Studies, 2016 (Golden Pavilion)
- Climb Sheer The Fields Of Peace – Alison O'Donnell, 2017 (Mega Dodo)
- Exotic Masks and Sensible Shoes – Alison O'Donnell, 2019 (Freeworld)

=== Singles ===
- Feeling High/Tea with the Sun – Mellow Candle, 1968 (SNB 55–3645)
- Dan the Wing – Mellow Candle, 1972 (Deram DM 357)
- Mariner Blues – Flibbertigibbet, 1978 (Stanyan Records 3EE 7002)
- Blackberry Bush – Flibbertigibbet, 1978 (Stanyan 3ES 703)
- Love Connection – Plastik Mak, 1980 (Flash Records FLS 001)
- Let the Bad Times Roll – The Medium Wave Band, 1982 (3rd Ear Music 3EE 7007)
- Frozen Warnings/Day is Done – Alison O'Donnell with Head South By Weaving, 2008 (Fruits de Mer Records, Crustacean 03)

=== EPs ===
- The Fabric of Folk – The Owl Service and Alison O'Donnell, 2008 (Static Caravan Recordings VAN 142). (redux edition), reissue EP, SPC 2015

=== Guest appearances ===
- The Road is Much Longer – Roger Lucey, 1979 (3rd Ear Records 3EE7004)
- World Winding Down (Double Album) – Agitated Radio Pilot, 2007 (deadslackstring records Truenote 10)
- Freedom and the Dream Penguin – The Field Mouse Conspiracy, 2008 (WMNY Recordings CD 039)
- Rewilding – Mr. Pine, 2008 (Whiskey Lad Recordings 78632 90223)
- The View From a Hill – The Owl Service, 2010 (Rif Mountain RM-004)
- The Guessing Game – Cathedral, 2010 (Nuclear Blast 27361 22760)
- Towards Abstraction – Big Dwarf, 2013 (Ajar Records)
- Derring Do – Dodson and Fogg, 2013 (Wisdom Twins Records)
- The Flooers O' The Forest, Songs and music of Flodden 1513–2013 Five Hundredth Anniversary (Compilation), 2013 (Greentrax Recordings) (Flodden Field from the EP The Fabric of Folk)
- Plankton – A Fruits de Mer Collection, 2013 (Record Collector) (vinyl)
- After the Fall – Dodson and Fogg, 2014 (Wisdom Twins Records)
- Songs from the Black Meadow (Compilation), 2014 (Black Meadow Song) and 2016 (Mega Dodo)
- Last Night I Dreamt of Hibrihteselle – Richard Moult, 2015 (Wild Silence)
- Sjoraust – Richard Moult, 2016 (Second Language)

== See also ==
- Mellow Candle
- Clodagh Simonds
