= Cora Venus Lunny =

Irish musician

- Genres: Classical; Celtic; Folk
- Occupations: Musician, composer, singer
- Instruments: Violin, singing
- Years active: 2002–present
- Member of: Sinéad O'Connor; Nigel Kennedy; Fovea Hex; Damien Rice; Luka Bloom; Eivør; Dublin Philharmonic Orchestra; Laura Sheeran; Dublin Gospel Choir
- Website: www.coravenuslunny.ie

Cora Venus Lunny is an Irish violinist, composer, and singer. She is the daughter of Irish musician Dónal Lunny and German photographer Julia Buthe.

Established as a classical musician since her teens, Lunny is active as a soloist, chamber musician, interpreter of contemporary classical music, improvising violinist and composer. She has toured Europe, America and China as a violin soloist with the Dublin Philharmonic Orchestra.

== Early years ==
Born into a musical family in Dublin, Lunny was given her first violin at the age of three, immediately showing a natural aptitude and love for the instrument. She was classically trained in the Suzuki Method. A brief fling with movie acting failed to distract her, and a life in music became her goal. From the age of thirteen she studied intensively with violin teachers around Europe, including Rimma Sushanskaya, Joji Hattori, Alexander Arenkov, Arkady Futer, Lara Lev and Vladimir Spivakov.

At the age of sixteen, she became the youngest ever winner of the RTÉ Musician of the Future competition, and was chosen by The Irish Times' TV ad campaign to represent the new face of Ireland.

== Music career ==
In 2001, she was a laureate of the Sarasate Violin International Competition in Pamplona, Spain, to which she would return again in 2007 as a member of the international jury.

In 2002, Lunny was a guest musician on Sinéad O'Connor's album of traditional Irish songs, Sean-Nós Nua, her first excursion into the non-classical world. This inspired her to improvise more and experiment with other genres of music. A few months in Vienna among the classical establishment became an unintentional sabbatical, and confirmed that despite her love for classical music, she needed to broaden her musical horizons. A jam with Nigel Kennedy in Dingle in 2002 (filmed for a Philip King documentary) resulted in an invitation to Berlin with his band, to play some Polish folk music and some Jimi Hendrix tunes. Subsequently, she accompanied Kennedy on a tour of Taiwan, Japan and New Zealand as second soloist, playing Vivaldi Double Concertos and some pieces by Bartok.

Lunny's musical travels took her as far as Iceland and the Faeroe Islands and, in 2004, she made her first foray into film score composition for Sangrail, an unfinished short. In 2005, she made her debut as a violist in a performance of Mozart's Sinfonia Concertante with Vladimir Spivakov and the Ulster Orchestra at the Waterfront Hall, Belfast. Also in 2005, she joined Clodagh Simonds' Fovea Hex.

Lunny has featured as a guest performer on other artists' albums (see Selected discography section). In 2011, Lunny released her first album, 1943, followed by Terminus (Conscientiae) in 2014.

== Film career ==
Lunny has appeared in several Irish films: Rawhead Rex (1986), Man About Dog (2004), Speed Dating (2007), Bachelors Walk Christmas Special (2006), and Mr Crocodile in the Cupboard (2008). She also contributed as a musician on the soundtrack of the following films and documentaries: Screw Cupid (2008), Truth About Kerry (2010), Men of Arlington (2011), and Mud Pies & Kites: Death & Resurrection in Haiti (2012).

== Selected discography ==
Solo albums

- 1943 (2011)
- Terminus (Conscientiae) (2014)

With Sinéad O'Connor

- Sean-Nós Nua (2002)

With Fovea Hex

- Neither Speak Nor Remain Silent (2005-2007)
  - Part 1: Bloom (2005)
  - Part 2: Huge (2006)
  - Part 3: Allure (2007)
- Hail Hope! (2010)
- Here Is Where We Used To Sing (2011)
- The Salt Garden 1 (2016)

With Damien Rice

- 9 (2006)
- My Favourite Faded Fantasy (2014)

With Eivør

- Mannabarn (2007)

With Luka Bloom

- Eleven Songs (2008)

With Declan de Barra

- A Fire To Scare The Sun (2008)

With The Jimmy Cake

- Spectre & Crown (2008)

With Dublin Gospel Choir

- Doing Their Thing (2009)

With Yurodny

- Evenset (2009)

With Tiger Cooke

- Fingertips Of The Silversmith (2010)

With Laura Sheeran

- Lust Of Pig & The Fresh Blood (2011)
- Echo (2013)
