= Michael Begg =

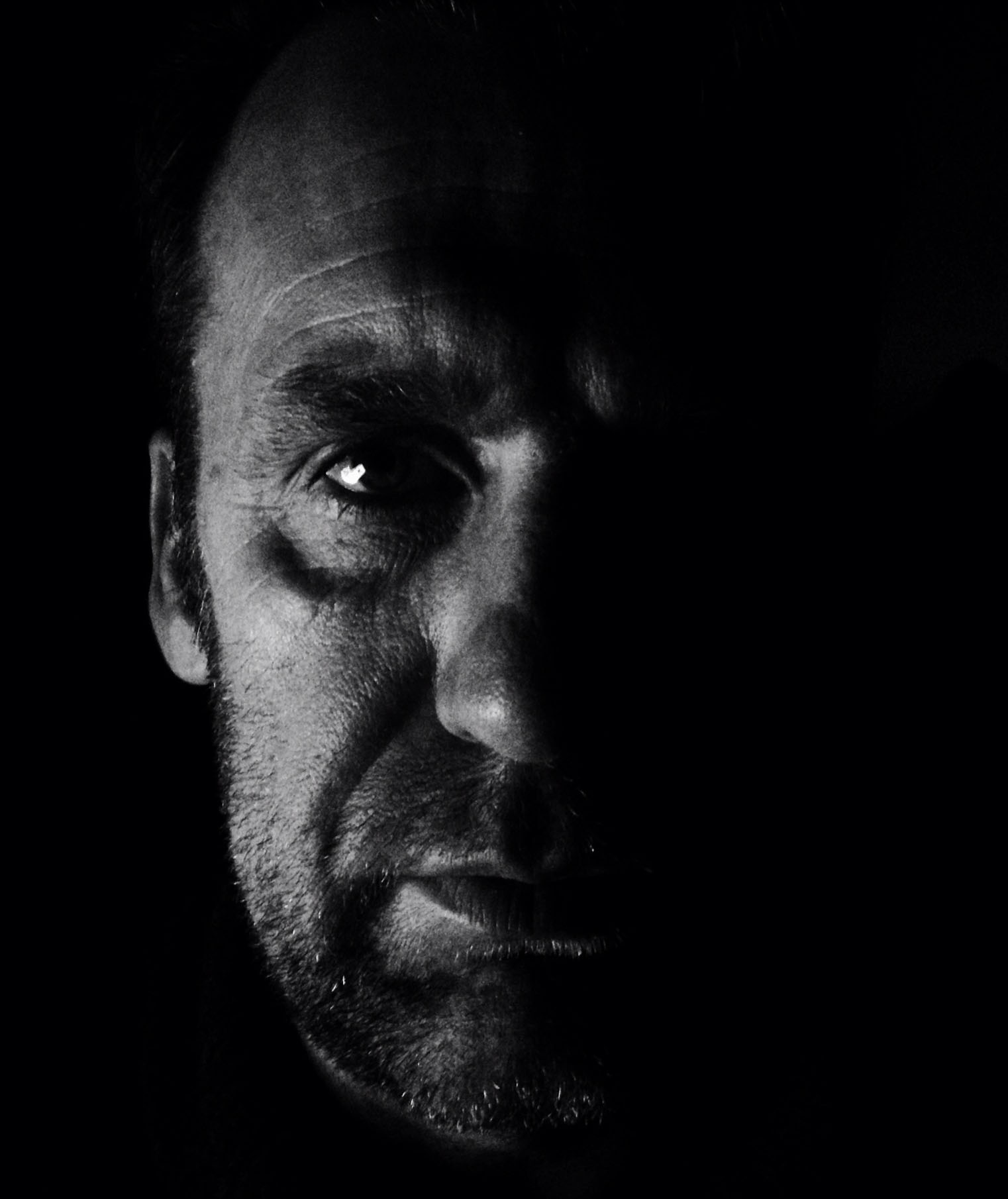
- Michael Begg, Scottish sound artist, musician and composer

Background information
- Born: Michael James Begg; 8 June 1966 (age 59); Edinburgh, Midlothian, Scotland
- Genres: Experimental; ambient
- Occupations: Composer, musician
- Instruments: Electronics, keyboards, guitars
- Years active: 2000–present
- Labels: Omnempathy, Janet Records, ICR, Die Stadt
- Website: omnempathy.com

Michael Begg (born 8 June 1966) is a Scottish composer, sound artist, and musician.

== Early life ==
Michael Begg was born in Edinburgh, Scotland, and was raised in the suburb of Currie. He attended Currie High School from 1978 to 1983 before enrolling in Chelsea College of Arts in London in 1984.

Begg returned to Scotland in 1989 because of debt. In Edinburgh, he became involved in theatre production as co-artistic director of Cerberus Theatre Company, and taught creative writing, music and theatre skills to various mental health groups.

== Music career ==
In 2000, making use of new affordable computer technologies, he began to experiment in computer mediated composition. Along with long time collaborator Deryk Thomas, he produced a series of recordings intended for use in theatre which became the first Human Greed album, Consolation.

Consolation was released in 2001 on Steven Severin's short lived RE: Records label. The name Human Greed arose from the title of a play for which Begg intended the music to inhabit.

Begg and Thomas have to date released four further albums under the group name Human Greed. Their most recent album, World Fair, was warmly received in 2014, making the end of year "best-of" lists, including the influential USA based Brainwashed list.

He began contributing to Clodagh Simonds' Fovea Hex project in 2007 with an appearance on the track "Long Distance" on the EP Allure, the third part of the Neither Speak Nor Remain Silent trilogy. He has since appeared on every subsequent Fovea Hex recording, and is a core member of the performing iteration of the ensemble.

In 2009, Begg was commissioned by Edinburgh City Council and Unique Events to produce a soundscape work to be performed in the city's St. Giles' Cathedral. This was undertaken as a collaboration with Colin Potter. The resulting work, Fragile Pitches, was described by the Glasgow Herald as "In turns eerie, contemplative and majestically other-worldly… magnificently put the avant-garde into a populist arena without ever labouring the point."

Begg has released a number of recordings in his own name, working more progressively towards a territory comprising site specific thematic work, contemporary classical music, and studio experimenting.

In 2016, he was commissioned by Public Art promoters Artichoke to provide music for the BBC broadcast of London 1666. The programme documented the floating and subsequent burning of sculptor David Best's floating model of the city of London on the river Thames.

In 2017, he was commissioned by Glasgow Cryptic to compose a new electronic work for Sonica 2017. The work was situated in the wheelhouse of the Titan Clydebank. The work received praise from the national press and earned Begg a New Music Scotland Award 2018.

In 2018, Begg formed and became artistic director for the Black Glass Ensemble, a combination of chamber players and electronic experimentalists. He continues to provide composition and sound design for Moscow based blackSKYwhite theatre company, and writes about music for publications including The Quietus, Sound on Sound, Audio Media International, and Total Theatre.

== Personal life ==
Begg lives in East Lothian with his wife and two sons.

== Selected discography ==
Solo

- A Moon That Lights Itself, 2016
- Titan: A Crane Is A Bridge, Omnempathy, 2017

With Human Greed

- Consolation, RE Records, 2001
- Pilgrim: New World Homestead, Omnempathy, 2006
- Black Hill: Midnight At The Blighted Star, Lumberton Trading Co. 2007
- Fortress Longing, Omnempathy/ICR, 2011
- World Fair, Omnempathy, 2014

Other albums

- Fovea Hex – Here Is Where We Used To Sing, Janet Records, 2012
- Michael Begg & Chris Connelly – New Town Nocturnes, 2016
- Fovea Hex – The Salt Garden 2, Headphone Dust/Die Stadt, June 2017
