= Fovea Hex =

Irish band

- Origin: Dublin, Ireland
- Genres: Ambient rock, folk rock, electronic rock, experimental rock
- Years active: 2005–present
- Labels: Flaming June, Die Stadt, Headphone Dust
- Members: Clodagh Simonds; Laura Sheeran; Cora Venus Lunny; Michael Begg; Colin Potter; Kate Ellis

Fovea Hex is an Irish experimental rock band, formed in 2005 by Clodagh Simonds. As a performing unit, Fovea Hex usually consists of Clodagh Simonds, Laura Sheeran, Cora Venus Lunny, Michael Begg and Colin Potter, with either Julia Kent, Kate Ellis or John Contreras on cello.

Between 2005 and 2007 Fovea Hex released three EPs, collectively entitled Neither Speak Nor Remain Silent, featuring Carter Burwell, John Contreras, Roger Doyle, Brian Eno, Roger Eno, Robert Fripp, Percy Jones, Cora Venus Lunny, Donal Lunny, Andrew M. McKenzie of The Hafler Trio, Sarah McQuaid, Hugh O'Neill, Geoff Sample, Lydia Sasse and Steven Wilson. Each EP was available in a special edition that included an additional disc, containing an extensive re-working of that EP's material by The Hafler Trio. Their first full-length album Here Is Where We Used To Sing was released in 2011.

In May 2007 Fovea Hex performed at the invitation of David Lynch at the Fondation Cartier in Paris, as part of his The Air Is on Fire retrospective exhibition. Having also performed in Austria, Spain and Italy in 2007 and 2008, Fovea Hex made their debut Irish performance at the Electric Picnic festival in Stradbally, County Laois, in August 2008.

In December 2015 Steven Wilson announced that Fovea Hex's EP The Salt Garden would be released on his Headphone Dust label as a limited edition 10 inch vinyl that also included a CD copy of the EP. Pre-orders also included a second CD featuring Wilson's own 21 minute interpretation of the track "Solace" from the EP.

== Discography ==
- Bloom (part 1 of Neither Speak Nor Remain Silent) - EP - Janet Records/Die Stadt, 1 November 2005
- Huge (part 2 of Neither Speak Nor Remain Silent) - EP - Janet Records/Die Stadt, 10 May 2006
- Allure (part 3 of Neither Speak Nor Remain Silent) - EP - Janet Records/Die Stadt, 1 June 2007
- Here Is Where We Used To Sing - album - Janet Records, 2012
- The Salt Garden 1 - EP - Headphone Dust/Die Stadt, 9 March 2016
- The Salt Garden 2 - EP - Headphone Dust/Die Stadt, June 2017
- The Salt Garden 3 - EP - Headphone Dust/Die Stadt, November 2019
