= Swaddling Songs =

Studio album by Mellow Candle
- Released: April 1972
- Recorded: December 1971
- Genre: Folk rock
- Length: 42:57
- Label: Deram Records
- Producer: David Hitchcock

Singles from Swaddling Songs
- 1. "Feeling High" Released: 1968; 2. "Dan The Wing" Released: 1972

Professional ratings
Review scores
Source	Rating
Allmusic	4/5 stars

Swaddling Songs is the only studio album by Irish progressive folk rock band Mellow Candle, originally released in 1972 by Deram Records.

Commercially unsuccessful at the time of release, Swaddling Songs has since received critical acclaim and original vinyl copies are highly collectable. It has been re-released multiple times on various labels since 1989, including a 50th anniversary release by Deram in 2023.

In 2022 the album's 50th anniversary was marked by the RTE radio documentary Swaddling Songs at 50.

Swaddling Songs is notable for its multi-layered vocal harmonies and complex arrangements. It has become regarded a classic of the progressive folk genre.

A collection of demos and sessions for the album recorded 1969–1971 was released in 1996 as The Virgin Prophet.

== Track listing ==
All tracks written by Clodagh Simonds except where noted.

1. "Heaven Heath" (Alison Williams) – 3:00
2. "Sheep Season" (Simonds, A. Williams, David Williams) – 5:01
3. "Silversong" – 4:26
4. "The Poet and the Witch" – 2:51
5. "Messenger Birds" (A. Williams) – 3:38
6. "Dan the Wing" – 2:45
7. "Reverend Sisters" – 4:21
8. "Break Your Token" – 2:27
9. "Buy or Beware" (D. Williams) – 3:04
10. "Vile Excesses" (D. Williams, William Murray) – 3:14
11. "Lonely Man" – 4:30
12. "Boulders on My Grave" – 3:40

== Bonus tracks ==
The CD re-issue includes the following bonus tracks, originally released as a single in 1968:

1. "Feeling High" (Simonds) – 2:23
2. "Tea with the Sun" (Simonds) – 3:18

== Singles ==
- "Feeling High" / "Tea With The Sun" (Snb (2) 55–3645, 1968)
- "Dan The Wing" / "Silversong" (Deram DM 357, 1972). "Silversong" was covered (as "Silver Song") by All About Eve as a B-side to some versions of their single "Farewell Mr. Sorrow".

== Personnel ==
=== Mellow Candle ===
- Clodagh Simonds – lead vocals, backing vocals, piano, harpsichord, mellotron
- Alison Williams (Alison Bools) – lead vocals, backing vocals
- David Williams – guitar, backing vocals
- Frank Boylan – bass guitar, backing vocals
- William Murray – drums, percussion

=== Production ===
- David Hitchcock – producer
- Derek Varnals – engineer
- Kevin Fuller – engineer
- Recorded at Tollington Park Studios

== Release history ==
Source for this section:

- 1972 UK, Deram SDL 7
- 1989 Japan, Decca: Edison European Rock Series ERC-29223/DCI 23190
- 1989 US, Zen ZN-001
- 1993 South Korea, Si-Wan SRML 0021
- 1994 UK, See For Miles SEECD 404
- 1994 Japan, Decca: British Rock Masterpiece POCD-1903
- 2000 Japan, Decca: British Rock Legend/Rock Fantasy Series UICY-9033
- 2003 Australia, Progressive Line PL 545
- 2004 UK, Acme ADCD1040
- 2005 South Korea, Universal SRML 0021
- 2007 Liechtenstein, Tapestry TPT 206
- 2008 Japan, Decca: Rock Legend Series UICY-93825
- 2010 Japan, Deram: My Generation My Music UICY-20146
- 2011 UK, Rise Above Records (boxed set) RARLP007
- 2020 UK, Deram (Record Store Day white vinyl) 085447–0
- 2021 UK, Esoteric ECLEC2044
- 2023 Europe, Deram 487 755–7, 00602448775573
