= Maria (Rodgers and Hammerstein song) =

Song
- Released: 1959 in The Sound of Music
- Genre: Showtune, Classical, Religious
- Composer(s): Richard Rodgers
- Lyricist(s): Oscar Hammerstein II

"Maria", sometimes known as "How Do You Solve a Problem Like Maria?", is a show tune from the Rodgers and Hammerstein musical The Sound of Music (1959).

== Background ==
This song is sung by the nuns at Nonnberg Abbey, who are exasperated with Maria for being a "flibbertigibbet"; they say that she is too frolicsome for the decorous and austere life at the Abbey.

The titular question is paraphrased with metaphorical questions, such as: "How do you catch a cloud and pin it down?"; "How do you keep a wave upon the sand?"; and "How do you hold a moonbeam in your hand?". These rhetorical questions on problems that cannot be solved act as proof that a problem like Maria is equally intractable.

When Oscar Hammerstein II wrote the lyric for this song, he followed the lead from a line in the dialogue that Howard Lindsay and Russel Crouse wrote in their script, describing Maria's flighty ways in the Abbey. In particular, he was taken by the detail of her wearing curlers in her hair under her wimple. Hammerstein asked if he could incorporate their dialogue into the song, and they allowed him to do so because: "If you tell a story in a song, it's so much better."

When writing the lyric, Hammerstein knew he needed adjectives for the nuns to describe Maria. He admitted that his vocabulary was never big, but the simple adjectives he used to describe Maria's character proved a success.

== In popular culture ==
This song gave its title to the Andrew Lloyd Webber reality TV series How Do You Solve a Problem Like Maria? (2006), in which TV viewers voted for a contestant to play the lead role of Maria von Trapp in his London revival of The Sound of Music. Connie Fisher won the TV series and was cast as Maria in the London revival of the show that opened in November 2006 at the London Palladium.

== See also ==
- How Do You Solve a Problem Like Maria?
