= From the Outside (Bert Jansch album) =

Studio album by Bert Jansch
- Released: September 1985 in Belgium
- Recorded: c. late 1983−1985
- Studios: Sweet Silence Studios, Copenhagen and Hern Place Studios, Sunningdale
- Genre: Folk
- Labels: Konnexion Records (1985); Hypertension (1993 reissue); Earth Recordings (2016 reissue)
- Producer: No producer credited

Bert Jansch chronology
Heartbreak (1982)	From the Outside (1985)	Leather Launderette (1989)

Professional ratings
Review scores
Source	Rating
Allmusic	3.5/5 stars

From the Outside is the 15th studio album by Scottish folk musician Bert Jansch. This album was released as a limited edition of 500 copies in Belgium in 1985. From The Outside was available in the UK as well, but was released by an unknown label.

Colin Harper describes the album in his Bert Jansch biography, "Dazzling Stranger": "Towards the end of 1985 a solo album called From the Outside appeared, but only just. Cobbled together from sessions in Denmark and London, with unsympathetic engineers and featuring only guitar and voice, it was Bert's rawest and most cathartic work since Bert Jansch twenty years earlier. It slipped out on the tiny Belgian label Konexion in a pressing of only five hundred copies, and a greater contrast to [Bert's previous studio album] Heartbreak would be hard to imagine."

On 10 June 2016, Earth Recordings reissued the album (remastered by Brian Pyle, with an amended track listing and new sleeve art) in digital, CD, and vinyl formats; the latter available in red and gold vinyl versions.

== Track listing ==
All tracks composed by Bert Jansch; except where indicated

1. "From The Outside" – 1:43
2. "Change The Song" – 3:16
3. "Read All About It" – 3:04
4. "Shout" – 3:18
5. "Ah Sure Wanna Know" – 3:32
6. "Times Is An Old Friend" – 2:53
7. "If You're Thinking 'Bout Me" (Jansch, Portman Smith) – 2:42
8. "Silver Raindrops" – 2:42
9. "Still Love Her Now That She's Gone" – 2:54
10. "Get Out My Life" – 2:35
11. "Sweet Rose" – 3:02
12. "Blues All Around Me" – 3:00
13. "From The Inside" – 1:46

=== CD reissue track list (Hypertension 1993) ===
1. "Sweet Rose" – 3:02
2. "Blackbird in the Morning" – 3:40
3. "Read All About It" – 3:04
4. "Change the Song" – 3:16
5. "Shout" – 3:18
6. "From The Outside" – 1:43
7. "If You're Thinking 'Bout Me" (Jansch, Portman Smith) – 2:42
8. "Silver Raindrops" – 2:42
9. "Why Me? (Still Love Her Not That She's Gone)" – 2:54
10. "Get Out of My Life" – 2:35
11. "Time Is An Old Friend" – 2:53
12. "River Running" – 3:17
13. "High Emotion" – 3:30
14. "From The Inside" – 1:46

=== 2016 reissue track list (Earth Recordings) ===
1. "Sweet Rose" – 3:02
2. "Blackbird in the Morning" – 3:40
3. "Read All About It" – 3:04
4. "Change the Song" – 3:16
5. "Shout" – 3:18
6. "From The Outside" – 1:43
7. "If You're Thinking 'Bout Me Babe" – 2:42
8. "Silver Raindrops" – 2:42
9. "Why Me (Still Love Her Now That She's Gone)" – 2:54
10. "Get Out Of My Life" – 2:35
11. "Time Is An Old Friend" – 2:53
12. "River Running" – 3:17
13. "High Emotion" – 3:30
14. "I Sure Wanna Know" – 3:32
15. "From The Inside" – 1:46

== Personnel ==
- Bert Jansch – guitar, banjo, vocals
