= Zdravitsa =

1939 cantata by Sergei Prokofiev

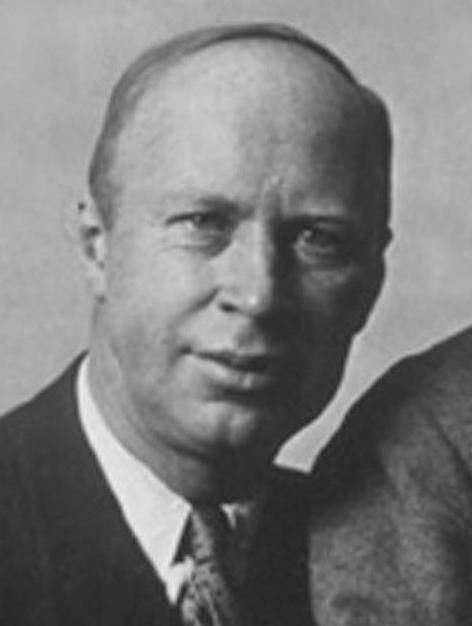
Sergei Prokofiev in 1936

Zdravitsa, Op. 85, (Russian: Здра́вица, lit. 'Toast!', Russian pronunciation: [ˈzdravʲɪt͡sə]) is a cantata written by Sergei Prokofiev in 1939 to celebrate Stalin's 60th birthday. Its title is sometimes translated as Hail to Stalin in English. A performance lasts around thirteen minutes.

== Background ==
After Prokofiev returned to the Soviet Union, he was viewed as a suspect in the eyes of the Stalinist regime and was under scrutiny. Numerous Soviet artists had already been arrested or even executed for creating art that was deemed too 'formalistic' by Soviet officials. Indeed, when Prokofiev collaborated with theatre director Vsevolod Meyerhold for his opera Semyon Kotko, the opera's premiere was postponed due to Meyerhold being arrested on 20 June 1939. Meyerhold was executed on 2 February 1940. In October 1939, Prokofiev was invited to write Zdravitsa for the approaching celebrations of Stalin's 60th birthday on 21 December.

== Libretto ==
The libretto, which according to the first edition was taken from "Russian, Ukrainian, Belorussian, Kumïk, Kurd, Mari, and Mordovian sources", is a patchwork of poems taken from a 534-page pseudo-folkloristic collection celebrating the 20th anniversary of the October Revolution. The fabricated contents were ostensibly the work of ordinary citizens from the USSR's many regions and ethnic groups. The anonymous government writers' attempts to imitate folk byliny are done in a clumsy and blundering manner. The selection was made by officials of the Radio Committee, which Prokofiev then reordered and edited. Using previously published texts obviated the need for official approval which new ones would have required and prevented a repeat of the damaging fiasco that had occurred when the Cantata for the 20th Anniversary of the October Revolution had to be rewritten after Prokofiev had produced his own libretto without official guidance.

== Analysis ==
Simon Morrison notes that "in explicit contrast to the reality of mass incarceration, starvation, and execution, [Zdravitsa and similar propaganda works] offer benign images of resplendent harvests and harmonious labor". The cantata opens with a sighing motif on trumpets, after which the strings play an expansive, flowing melody in C major. The choir suddenly enters, and the music picks up speed. The choir slips cheekily into distant keys now and then, but the harmonic language contains nothing too 'unorthodox' which would have been anathema to Soviet musical strictures. Faster staccato sections continue to alternate with slower flowing sections.

Of special interest is the penultimate section, where the choir races up and down a C major scale (spanning more than two octaves), rather like a child practising piano scales: the British journalist, Alexander Werth (author of Musical Uproar in Moscow), "wondered whether [Prokofiev] hadn't just the tip of his tongue in his cheek as he made the good simple kolkhozniks sing a plain C major scale, up and down, up and down, and up and down again...". The orchestra provides alternating G and A-flat pedal notes. The cantata ends in a blazing C major, a favourite key of Prokofiev (cf. Piano Concerto No. 3, Russian Overture, and Symphony No. 4), while the choir sings, "You are the banner flying from our mighty fortress! You are the flame that warms our spirit and our blood, O Stalin, Stalin!"

Sviatoslav Richter, in Bruno Monsaingeon's documentary, criticizes the "brutal" Prokofiev for working on commission "without principles" and calls Zdravitsa unplayable today due to its subject matter, but, nevertheless, an "absolute work of genius".

== Performance history ==
The cantata premiered on 21 December 1939 in Moscow, conducted by Nikolai Golovanov. It was broadcast twice in 1952. After de-Stalinization, the text, like many others, was rewritten to remove references to the now partially disgraced Stalin. In the editions of 1970 and 1984, the toast becomes a toast to the Communist Party of the Soviet Union.

== Text and translation ==
Никогда так не было
поле зелено.
Небывалой радости
всё село полно.
Никогда нам не была
жизнь так весела.
Никогда досель у нас,
рожь так не цвела.
Но иному светит нам
солнце на земле.
Знать оно у Сталина
побыло в Кремле.

Я, пою, качая сына
на своих руках: "Ты расти,
как колосочек
в синих васильках.
Сталин будет первым словом
на твоих губах.
Ты поймешь, откуда льётся
этот яркий свет.
Ты в тетрадке нарисуешь
Сталинский портрет.

Ой, бела в садочках вишня,
как туман бела.
Жизнь моя весенней
вишней нынче расцвела!
Ой, горит-играет солнце
в светлых каплях рос.
Этот свет, тепло и солнце
Сталин нам принес.
Знай, сынок мой ненаглядный,
что его тепло
Через боры, через горы
до тебя дошло.

Ой, бела, бела в садочках
вишня, как туман бела,
Жизнь у нас весенней вишней расцвела!"
Если б молодость да снова вернулась,
Если б Кокшага-река на север побежала,
Если бы глаза мои блистали,
как в семнадцать лет,
Если б щёки розовели, как яблоко спелое,
Я бы съездила в Москву, город большой.
Я сказала бы большое спасибо
Иосифу Сталину.

Он всё слышит-видит, слышит-видит
как живёт народ,
Как живёт народ, работает.
За хороший труд, за труд хороший
награждает всех.
Он в Москву к себе, в Москву к себе
приглашает тех
Он встречает ласково, говорит со всеми
Говорит со всеми, весело, ласково, ой!

Он всё слышит-видит, слышит-видит
как живёт народ,
Как живёт народ, работает.
За хороший труд, за труд хороший
награждает всех.
Он гостей проводит в светлы горницы.
Он садит за столики, за дубовые
– порасспросит всё,
да порасспросит-поразведает.
Как работают, чем нуждаются?
Ой, не наша ли земля да раскрасавица
Как работает чем нуждается?
Сам даёт советы мудрые.

Он всё слышит-видит, слышит-видит,
как живёт народ.
За хороший труд, за труд хороший
награждает всех.
Он в Москву к себе, в Москву к себе
приглашает тех.
Он встречает всех очень весело,
Он встречает всех очень ласково,
Мудрые советы сам даёт.

Ой, вчера мы песни, песни, да гуляли!
То не русую мы косу пропивали,
То не замуж мы Аксинью выдавали –
В гости к Сталину Аксинью провожали.
В Москву-город провожали мы в столицу,
Как невесту наряжали – молодицу.
Выходила свет – Аксинья за ворота;
Хороша собой, красива, в новых ботах.
За околицу Аксинью провожали мы,
С нею Сталину привет посылали мы.

Он всё слышит-видит, слышит-видит,
как живёт народ,
Как живёт народ, работает.
За хороший труд, за труд хороший
награждает всех.

Много, Сталин, вынес ты невзгод
И много муки принял за народ.
За протест нас царь уничтожал.
Женщин без мужей он оставлял.
Ты открыл нам новые пути.
За тобой нам радостно идти.
Твои взоры — наши взоры, вождь родной!
Твои думы — наши думы, до одной!
Нашей крепости высокой — знамя ты!
Мыслей наших, крови нашей — пламя ты,
Сталин, Сталин!

Never before
Were the fields so green.
With unprecedented joy
The whole village is full.
Never before for us
Has life been so joyous.
Never before in our country,
Has the rye blossomed so.
Differently now, the sun
Shines upon the earth.
Surely the sun must have been
With Stalin in the Kremlin.

I sing, rocking my son
In my arms: "You shall grow up,
like a stalk of wheat,
Amongst the blue cornflowers.
Stalin shall be the first word
On your lips.
You shall learn
The source of this bright light.
You will draw in your notebook
A picture of Stalin.

Oh, white is the cherry tree in the garden,
Like a white mist.
My life is blooming
Like the spring cherry blossom now!
Oh, the sun glows and dances
In the bright dewdrops.
This light, warmth and sun,
Stalin brought to us.
Know, my beloved son,
That his warmth
Through forests, across mountains,
Reaches you.

Oh, white, white in the gardens
Is the cherry, white as mist.
Our life has blossomed like the cherry!
If my youth suddenly returned,
If the Kokshaga River suddenly ran North,
If my eyes glowed
As they did when I was seventeen,
If my cheeks became pink like a ripe apple,
I would go to Moscow, the great city.
I would give thanks to
Joseph Stalin.

He hears all, sees all,
How the people live,
How the people live and work.
He rewards everyone
For their hard work.
He invites them
To see him in Moscow.
He welcomes them kindly,
He talks with them merrily, kindly, oh!

He hears all, sees all,
How the people live,
How the people live and work.
He rewards everyone
For their hard work.
He leads his guests into the bright rooms.
He bids them all sit down at the tables made of oak,
And asks them about everything
He wants to know.
How is their work? What do they need?
Is not our motherland beautiful?
But how is the people's work? What do they need?
He himself gives us his wise advice.

He hears all, sees all,
How the people live.
He rewards everyone
For their hard work.
He invites them
To see him in Moscow.
He welcomes them kindly,
He welcomes them merrily,
He himself gives us his wise advice.

Oh, yesterday we sang, we celebrated!
We were not drinking to celebrate as Aksinia's light brown braid
Was plighted to her betrothed –
We were sending Aksinia on a visit to Stalin.
To the city of Moscow we sent her, to the capital.
We dressed her as if she were a young bride.
Aksinia, our light, went out of the gate;
So beautiful, so handsome, in new boots.
We escorted Aksinia to the end of the village.
With her, we send greetings to Stalin.

He hears all, sees all,
How the people live,
How the people live and work.
He rewards everyone
For their hard work.

You, O Stalin, have faced many trials,
And for the people suffered much.
When we protested the Tsar crushed us,
And left women without husbands.
You have opened a new way for us.
Behind you, we joyously march.
Your vision is our vision, O leader of the people!
Your thoughts are our thoughts, indivisible!
You are the banner flying from our mighty fortress!
You are the flame that warms our spirit and our blood,
O Stalin, Stalin!

== Instrumentation ==
The cantata is scored for piccolo, 2 flutes, 2 oboes, English horn, 2 clarinets, bass clarinet, 2 bassoons, contrabassoon, 4 horns, 3 trumpets, 3 trombones, tuba, timpani, percussion (woodblocks, snare drum, tambourine, triangle, cymbals, bass drum, tam-tam, xylophone, tubular bells), harp, piano, strings, and a choir.

== Recordings ==
Orchestra	Choir	Conductor	Record company	Year of recording	Format
State Symphony Capella of Russia	State Symphony Capella of Russia	Valery Polyansky	Chandos Records	2003	CD
London Philharmonic Orchestra	Geoffrey Mitchell Choir / London Philharmonic Choir	Derek Gleeson	IMP Masters	2000	CD
New Philharmonic Orchestra	Saint Petersburg Philharmonic Choir	Alexander Titov	Beaux	1998	CD
USSR Radio/TV Large Symphony Orchestra	Moscow Radio Chorus	Yevgeny Svetlanov	Le Chant Du Monde	1962	CD

== Notes ==
=== Sources ===
- Jaffé, Daniel, Sergey Prokofiev (London: Phaidon, 1998; rev. 2008)
- Morrison, Simon (2009). The People's Artist: Prokofiev's Soviet Years. Oxford University Press. ISBN 9780199830985 – via Internet Archive.
- Werth, Alexander, The Year of Stalingrad (London: Hamish Hamilton, 1946)
