= Derek Gleeson =

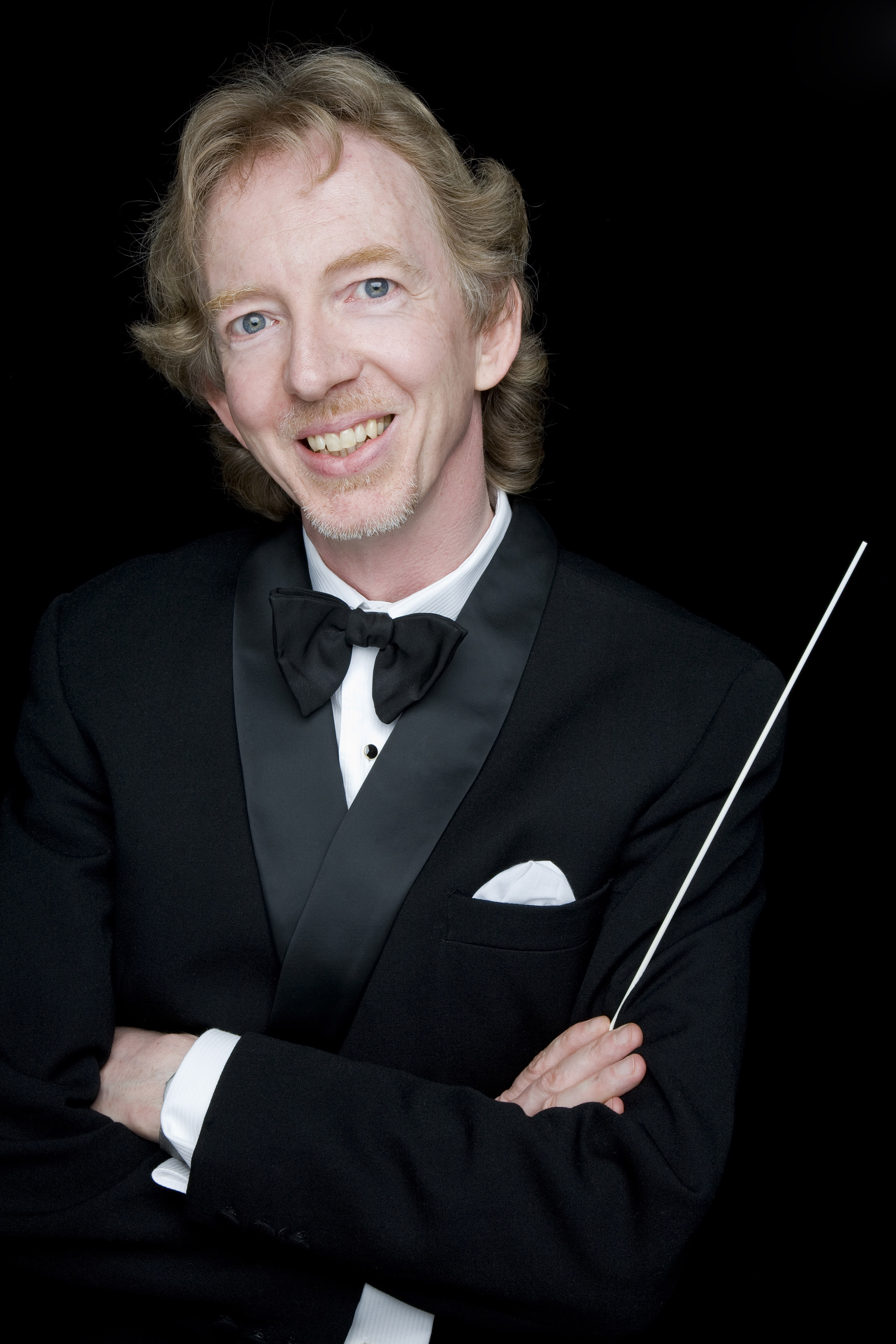

Background information
- Origin: Dublin, Ireland.
- Genres: Orchestral/contemporary
- Occupation: Conductor/composer
- Instruments: Piano, timpani & percussion
- Website: http://www.derekgleeson.com

Derek Gleeson is an Irish/American musician. Born in Dublin, Ireland. He is currently the music director and conductor of the Dublin Philharmonic Orchestra (since 1997) and has been the conductor at the Anna Livia Dublin International Opera Festival (now disbanded). Since 2025 Gleeson is also music director & conductor of the Vienna Festival Orchestra * Vienna Festival Orchestra – CAMI Music. Since January 2016 Gleeson is Principal Guest Conductor or The Harbin Symphony Orchestra, Harbin, China. (A city of 10 million people) He also composes musical scores for film and television and of symphonic music for the concert hall.

Gleeson Founded the FAS/Screen Training Ireland Film Scoring Program in 1996 (now called ScreenSkills) with Industry legend Don Brandon Ray, the creator of the first film scoring program in the world at UCLA in 1980. * Industry Mourns Death of Composer Don Brandon Ray – IFTN

He then founded the Pulse College/DIT MA in scoring program in Ireland in 2014 They shoot, they score – The Irish Times (2014) and the Film Scoring Academy of Europe in Sofia, Bulgaria in 2016, as well as the Film Scoring Academy of Europe Examination Board in Ireland in 2019. Gleeson was Founder Board Member and executive director of the European Academy of Fine Arts from September 2019 until July 2024

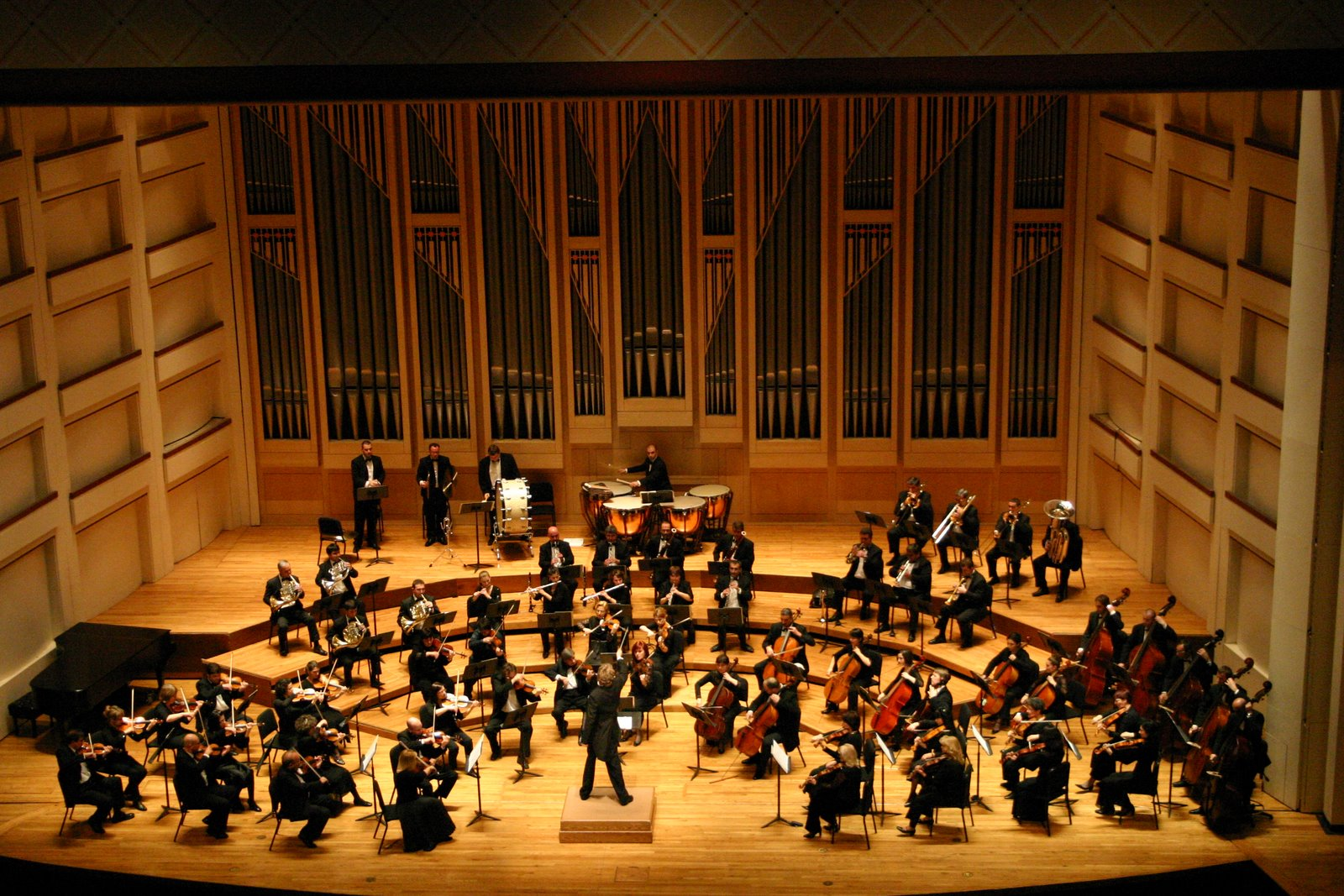
DPO Conductor Derek Gleeson

== Early musical life ==
At age twelve, Gleeson was timpanist of the Irish Youth Orchestra. At age fifteen he joined the European Community Youth Orchestra (ECYO) (now the European Union Youth Orchestra, EUYO) as percussionist and timpanist, where he had the opportunity to work under the great conducting masters of the day, including Herbert Von Karajan, Claudio Abbado, Leonard Bernstein, Sir Georg Solti and Daniel Barenboim, whilst performing, amongst others, at the Salzburg Festival, the Edinburgh Festival, Lucerne Festival as well as at the BBC Proms at the Royal Albert Hall. In parallel, he was also a member of "EuroJazz" The European Community Youth Jazz Orchestra and NYJO, The National Youth Jazz Orchestra of Great Britain, with whom he featured as Vibraphone soloist in the CD release of Paul Hart's Concerto for Classical Guitar and Jazz Orchestra, written for Guitarist John Williams, released on CBS Records.

At 15 years old, as freelance timpanist and percussionist, Gleeson began working with the RTÉ Concert Orchestra and the RTÉ Symphony Orchestra while still attending High School. Between 1979 and 1989 he performed as a freelance orchestral player with many of the prominent British Orchestras, and the Chamber Orchestra of Europe. In 1984 he was a prize winner in the Shell/London Symphony Orchestra Music Scholarship. During this period he also worked as a Studio Session Musician, principally as a Keyboardist and Piano player for pop/rock and commercial recording sessions. Gleeson studied Piano and Timpani & Percussion at the Royal Academy of Music, London, and Composition and Film Scoring at the University of California at Los Angeles (UCLA).

Whilst living and studying conducting in Vienna at the Hochschule für Musik und darstellende Kunst, Wien (University of Music and Performing Arts, Vienna) Gleeson sang second bass with Gunther Theuring's, Wiener Jeunesse-Chor, with whom he performed with the Wiener Philharmoniker at the Musikverein. (Gleeson also studied Voice periodically with the famed Irish vocal teacher Veronica Dunne at the Dublin Institute of Technology Conservatory of Music & Drama.

In 1989, Gleeson "won" a US Green Card (NP-5 Visa) in the US Donnelly Visa lottery and moved to Los Angeles where he attended UCLA, studying Film Scoring and Composition.

== Conducting ==
In December 1989, Gleeson moved to Los Angeles, left the world of the freelance orchestral musician, and directed his time exclusively to conducting and composition.

Gleeson has conducted amongst others, the Dublin Philharmonic Orchestra, the London Philharmonic Orchestra, the RTÉ Concert Orchestra, the National Symphony Orchestra of Ireland, The Czech National Symphony Orchestra, Orchestra da Camera Fiorentina, in Italy, the Bohuslav Martinů Philharmonic, the Karlovy Vary Symphony Orchestra, RTL Orchestra, the NOS Nederlandse Omroep Stichting Orchestra, ); the Danish Radio Concert Orchestra, Orchestra of the Sadlers Wells Royal Ballet, Bulgarian National Radio Symphony Orchestra, Philharmonia Bulgarica, in Bulgaria; the Vratza Philharmonic Orchestra, the Los Angeles Composers Guild Chamber Orchestra, the Ruckert Chamber Orchestra, Orchestre Symphonic de Bretagne (France), Hradec Kralove Symphony Orchestra (Czech) The National Ballet of China Symphony Orchestra, Varna State Opera, Plovid State Opera, Bourgas State Opera, the Tehran Symphony Orchestra, Prague Philharmonia and the Harbin Symphony Orchestra, Harbin, China.

Gleeson conducted the premier CD recording of Tchaikovsky's Ode to Joy, The original Romeo and Juliet Fantasy Overture and Prokofiev's Zdravitsa with the London Philharmonic Orchestra and Choir.

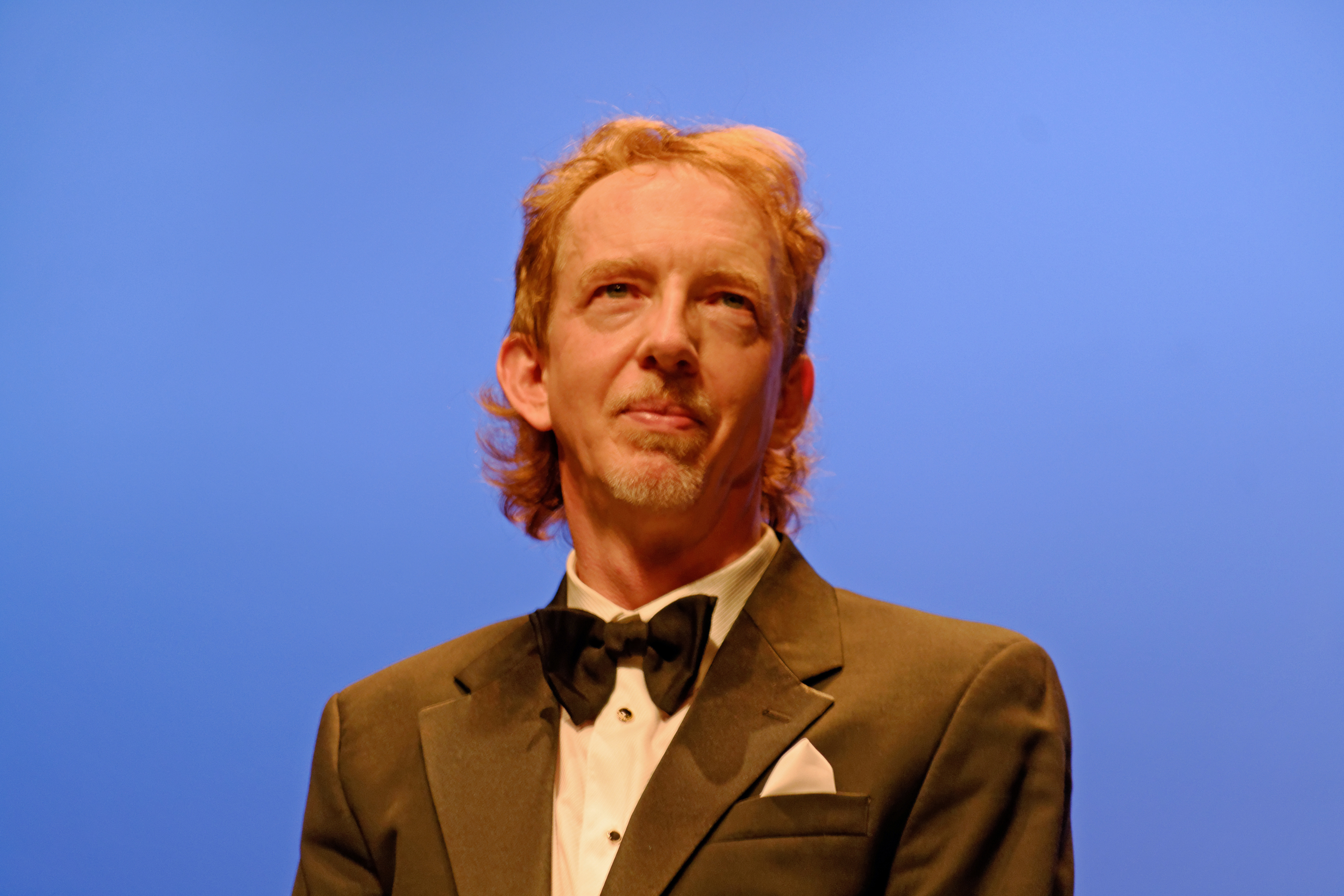
In 2015 with Symphony Orchestra of Brittany and celtic rock guitarist Dan Ar Braz.

In 2009, Gleeson and the Dublin Philharmonic Orchestra made the largest orchestral tour of the US that year, to over 49 cities, under the auspices of Columbia Artists Management, Inc.

In 2010, Gleeson and the DPO toured China, performing at the Shanghai Grand Theatre's World Expo Program, and two concerts opening the Beijing Summer Festival "Roam about the Classics" from the National Centre for the Performing Arts (NCPA) at the Opera House, televised throughout China to over 400 million people.

In January 2016 Gleeson lead the Dublin Philharmonic Orchestra on its second tour of China, performing in Suzhou, Wuhan, Tianjin, Harbin and Changsha.

In 2017 Gleeson lead the Czech National Symphony Orchestra on a tour of China. http://www.cnso.cz

In 2018 Gleeson lead the Dublin Philharmonic Orchestra on a tour of India.

== Composer and Producer ==
Gleeson composed Film Scores for the feature films The White Pony (Director Brian Kelly); Irish Whiskey (Director Jon Stevens); Moving Target (Director Paul Ziller); The Doorway (Director Michael Druxman); Kitchen (Director Kieron J Walsh) and additional music on The Suicide Club (Director Rachel Samuels).

In addition to composing music for film, Gleeson is Director of Ceoil Productions Ireland/Screen Training Ireland's Film Scoring Program. He served as composer advisor to Moonstone International and as Music Jury chairman and Composer of the Irish Film & Television Awards (IFTAs). Gleeson founded Screen Training Ireland's/UCLA Certificate Program in Film Scoring. Founder and Director of Ireland's "MA in Scoring for Film & Visual Media", a Pulse College/Windmill Lane Studios/Dublin Institute of Technology collaboration. (2014 -2018). He then Founded the Film Scoring Academy of Europe in 2016 and the Film Scoring Academy of Europe Examination Board in 2019.

Gleeson is a producer for both Columbia Artists Management and CAMI Music, producing international touring acts for the U.S. domestic market. Including The Dublin Philharmonic Orchestra, The Five Irish Tenors, The Four Italian Tenors, Songs of Ireland, Dublin Irish Dance, Brazilian All Stars and Tango Argentina.
