= Clodagh Simonds =

Irish musician, songwriter and singer (born 1953)

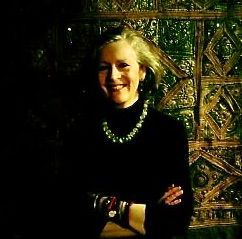

Background information
- Born: Clodagh Simonds; 16 May 1953 (age 73); Banbridge, County Down, Northern Ireland
- Instruments: Voice, piano, keyboard, Harmonium
- Labels: Deram, Janet Records, Die Stadt
- Website: Official Website

Clodagh Simonds (/ˈkloʊdə/ KLOH-də; born 16 May 1953) is an Irish musician, songwriter and singer. She was born in Banbridge, County Down, Northern Ireland and raised and educated in Killiney, County Dublin.

== Career ==
At the age of eleven, in 1964 Simonds formed her first band, Mellow Candle, with two schoolfriends, Alison Bools (later Williams, later O'Donnell) and Maria White. They released their first single, "Feelin' High", on SNB Records in 1968, when she was fifteen. Three years later, initially under the management of Thin Lizzy manager Ted Carroll, and with an expanded line-up, Mellow Candle released their only album, Swaddling Songs, which made little or no impact beyond Ireland until around twenty-five years later. The group disbanded in 1973.

Between 1972 and 1975, she guested on Thin Lizzy's second album, Shades of a Blue Orphanage, and sang on the Mike Oldfield albums Hergest Ridge, Ommadawn (also helping Oldfield to coin the album title).

In 1976 Simonds and Mellow Candle drummer William Murray moved to New York, at one point playing in a band with Carter Burwell and Stephen Bray. Simonds wrote music for two theatre productions at La MaMa ETC and resumed studies of the piano and music of other cultures.

In 1989, interest in Mellow Candle reawakened in Japan, and Deram re-released the album there. The album has subsequently been re-released several times in other countries.

In 1990 she sang on Mike Oldfield's album Amarok.

In 1991 one of Simonds' songs, "Silversong", was covered by All About Eve.

In 1996, by which time Simonds had returned to Ireland, her mini-album Six Elementary Songs was produced by Tom Newman and released on the Tokyo-based label Evangel Records. That same year, the album Virgin Prophet, consisting mostly of recordings for Deram by a pre-drums line-up of Mellow Candle, was licensed to UK label Kissing Spell. It included two even earlier solo demos, written and recorded by Simonds at the age of 16.

In 1998 her sampled voice appeared on "Far Above the Clouds" on Mike Oldfield's Tubular Bells III, and her song "Poet and the Witch" was covered by Stephen Malkmus.

In 1999, she sang a version of the Syd Barrett/James Joyce song "Golden Hair" for Russell Mills' album Pearl & Umbra.

=== Fovea Hex ===
Between 2005 and 2007, under the name Fovea Hex, she released 3 EPs, collectively entitled Neither Speak Nor Remain Silent, featuring Michael Begg, Carter Burwell, John Contreras, Roger Doyle, Brian Eno, Roger Eno, Robert Fripp, Percy Jones, Cora Venus Lunny, Dónal Lunny, Andrew M. McKenzie of The Hafler Trio, Sarah McQuaid, Colin Potter of Nurse with Wound, Lydia Sasse, Laura Sheeran, and Steven Wilson. Each EP was available in a special edition that included an additional disc, containing an extensive re-working of that EP's material by The Hafler Trio.

In 2011, Fovea Hex released the album Here is Where we Used to Sing, produced by Colin Potter, featuring Laura Sheeran, Michael Begg, Cora Venus Lunny, Brian Eno, Kate Ellis, Julia Kent and John Contreras.

Between 2016 and 2019, Fovea Hex released another trilogy of EPs, collectively titled The Salt Garden, released jointly by Die Stadt and Steven Wilson’s Headphone Dust label. In 2021, Disques Crepuscule released an album of Steven Wilson remixes, entitled The Salt Garden (Landscaped).

As a performing unit, Fovea Hex comprises Simonds, Laura Sheeran, Cora Venus Lunny, Michael Begg and Colin Potter, with either Julia Kent, Kate Ellis or John Contreras on cello. In May 2007, Fovea Hex performed at the invitation of David Lynch at the Fondation Cartier in Paris, as part of his The Air Is on Fire retrospective exhibition. The band subsequently performed in Ireland, the UK and Europe until 2019.

== Discography ==
=== Albums ===
- Mellow Candle, Swaddling Songs (Deram, 1971)
- Fovea Hex, Bloom (part 1 of Neither Speak Nor Remain Silent, Janet Records/Die Stadt, 2005)
- Fovea Hex, Huge (part 2 of Neither Speak Nor Remain Silent, Janet Records/Die Stadt, 2006)
- Fovea Hex, Allure (part 3 of Neither Speak Nor Remain Silent, Janet Records/Die Stadt, 2007)
- Fovea Hex, Here Is Where We Used To Sing, Janet Records, 2012
- Fovea Hex,The Salt Garden 1, Headphone Dust/Die Stadt, 9 March 2016
- Fovea Hex, The Salt Garden 2, Headphone Dust/Die Stadt, June 2017
- Fovea Hex, The Salt Garden 3, Headphone Dust/Die Stadt, November 2019
- Fovea Hex, The Salt Garden (Landscaped), Disques Crepuscule, 2021

=== Singles ===
- Mellow Candle, "Feelin High"/"Tea with the Sun" (SNB, 1968)
- Mellow Candle, "Dan The Wing"/"Silversong" (Deram, 1971)
- Fovea Hex & Andrew Liles, "Gone"/"Every Evening" (Die Stadt, 2007)

=== Compilations ===
- “By The Glacial Lake” for Not Alone, a fundraiser compilation of 5 CDs for Médecins San Frontière’s work on AIDS, curated by Mark Logan and David Tibet, 2006
- ‘Idumea” on “Black Ships Ate The Sky”, David Tibet's album Black Ships Ate the Sky, 2006
- “Under The Water (Iridescence)” on Heart Of The Sun by Andria Degens/Pantaleimon, 2008
- Abul Mogard’s remix "We Dream all the Dark Away" on And We Are Passing Through Silently, 2019

=== Selected credits ===
- Thin Lizzy, Shades of a Blue Orphanage (vocals, piano, mellotron), 1972
- Mike Oldfield, Hergest Ridge (vocals), 1974
- Mike Oldfield, Ommadawn (vocals, lyrics), 1975
- Jade Warrior, Kites (vocals), 1976
- Mike Oldfield, Amarok (vocals), 1990
- Mike Oldfield,Tubular Bells III (vocals), 1998
- Russell Mills, Pearl + Umbra (vocals, harmonium), 1999
- Tunnels with Percy Jones, Natural Selection (treated vocals), 2006
- Current 93, Black Ships Ate The Sky (vocals, zither, psaltery), 2006
- Matmos, For Alan Turing (vocals on "Molly Malone"), 2020
- Human Greed, Black Hill: Midnight At the Blighted Star (piano), 2008
- Steven Wilson, Insurgentes, (vocals, lyrics), 2008
- Matmos, The Ganzfeld (vocals on "Just Waves"), 2012
- Thinguma*jigsaw, Misery Together (piano on track: "Folkgore / Dulce Et Decorum Est Pro Pornografica Mori"), 2012
- Brian Eno, ForeverAndEverNoMore, "These Small Noises" (vocals), 2022
