= Colin Harper =

Irish non-fiction author and composer (born 1968)

Colin Harper (born 1968, in Belfast) is an Irish non-fiction author and composer.

== Background ==
Harper was born in Belfast and graduated in Modern History 1989 from Queen's University, Belfast, later acquiring a postgraduate diploma in Information Management from Queen's University (1997) and a PhD in Cultural Studies from the University of Sunderland (2014). Between 1994 and 2001 he was a professional freelance journalist. For Belfast newspaper Irish News he wrote features on unsigned local bands and famous bands on tour. In the same period he wrote features and reviewed regularly for popular music magazines such as Q and Mojo. He also contributed both theatre and music reviews to The Irish Times.

Harper became a regular writer of liner notes for compilations of folk, acoustic and prog-rock artists appearing on record labels including Windsong, Demon, Castle, Hux and Snapper. His long-time admiration of Bert Jansch led to his biography of Jansch, Dazzling Stranger (its title taken from a song by Alan Tunbridge). This was launched at the Edinburgh International Book Festival. He followed up the book release by being the driving force behind the tribute album People on the Highway: A Bert Jansch Encomium (Market Square, 2000). He also contributed to the Jansch documentary Dreamweaver on Channel 4 in 2000. An updated edition of Dazzling Stranger was released in 2006 including a foreword by The Smiths guitarist Johnny Marr. It was further updated in 2011, with a new Afterword by Pete Paphides.

Harper had a sabbatical in the public sector between 2001 and 2011. He continued to contribute to magazines, mainly for Mojo and Record Collector, until 2007. During this time he published one more book, Seaside Rock (2003), a small monograph on pop music in North Down in the 60s, and co-wrote Irish Folk, Trad and Blues: A Secret History (with Trevor Hodgett, 2004 and 2005).

In support of the charity World Wide Fund for Nature Harper organised two benefit compilation albums: The Wildlife Album (2004) and Live In Hope: The Wildlife Album 2 (2005). His other annotated CD compilations include the collected works of Atomic Rooster and Andy Roberts. Freedom & The Dream Penguin, a collection of his songs – fronted by guest vocalists including Judy Dyble, Alison O'Donnell, Janet Holmes, Paul Casey and Brian Houston – was released in 2008, credited to The Field Mouse Conspiracy. An album of original instrumental compositions, Titanium Flag, was self-released in 2010.

Escaping from the public sector in December 2011, Harper threw himself back into creative mode, beginning work on Bathed in Lightning: John McLaughlin, the 60s and the Emerald Beyond, his biography of guitarist John McLaughlin (up to 1975) in the context of London's musical scenes (jazz, R&B, free improvisation, pop session work) in the 1960s. The book was published by Jawbone Press in 2015, pre-launched with a music and speech podcast event with a live audience at Belfast's RedBox Studios, involving Irish jazz personality/BBC NI broadcaster Linley Hamilton, Horslips member/RTE broadcaster Jim Lockhart and various local jazz, blues, bluegrass and pop musicians. Unusually, the ebook edition added nearly 100,000 words of extra content to the 215,000-word print edition, with the ebook content also published as a stand-alone ebook for a nominal price at Harper's behest.

Two further books followed, written simultaneously, in 2015. The Wheels of The World: 300 Years of Irish Uilleann Pipers (Jawbone Press, 2015) is a 250,000-word history of the Irish pipes told through detailed chapters on some of its greatest players, going back to the early 1700s. It was written in collaboration with international recording artist/piper John McSherry. The book was promoted with articles in fRoots and the Irish Times, and by a number of live events at festivals, concerts and bookshops in Ireland in mid to late 2015, and radio sessions on BBC NI and RTE including an edition of Arena helmed by Jim Lockhart. Eyes Wide Open: True Tales of a Wishbone Ash Warrior (Jawbone Press, 2015) was published within a month of the piping book in October 2015, written by guitarist/vocalist Andy Powell in close collaboration with Harper. It was launched with an onstage Q&A at Wishbone Ash's annual AshCon event in Chesterfield in November 2015.

Other creative activity in the 2012–15 period included extensive booklets for the RPM record label's celebrations of the work of 1960s–70s British folk and jazz producer Peter Eden: The Eve Folk Recordings (RPM, 2014) 2-CD set and Turtle Records: Pioneering British Jazz 1970–71 (RPM, 2015), a 3-CD box set with 17,000 word perfect-bound booklet, including interviews with Eden and many of his artists – Howard Riley, Barry Guy, Mike Cooper, Mike Gibbs, Norma Winstone, John Taylor and others. Harper was also involved in the reissue, including booklet essay, of another 1970 Peter Eden production, guitarist Chris Spedding's Songs Without Words (Hux, 2015), and also annotated a 4CD Wishbone Ash box Road Works (Talking Elephant, 2016) in this period. In March 2016 Harper's mostly instrumental album Sunset Cavaliers, widely reviewed in Brirtish music journals (Mojo, Uncut, Prog, R2, Choice, Record Collector), was released by Market Square Records. A homage to the musical soundworlds and time period Harper chronicles most often in his writing, the album featured guest appearances from many of his recent and past collaborators – John McSherry (uilleann pipes), Chris Spedding, Andy Powell, Bert Jansch (guitars), Linley Hamilton (flugelhorn), and Duffy Power (harmonica/vocal) among others. Harper had been asked to write three obituaries on Power – whom he regards as one of the unsung greats of the 1960s – in February 2014, for The Guardian, Mojo and Record Collector.

During the first quarter of 2016, Harper focused on curating for Hux Records, as the label's 150th release, Spirits From Another Time: 1969-71 a 2-CD set of unreleased studio material by multicultural British rock band Quintessence. Material was licensed from Universal, digitised at Abbey Road Studios, and mixed and mastered by Cormac O'Kane with Harper at RedBox Studios, Belfast. Original members Phil 'Shiva' Jones and Dave 'Maha Dev' Codling contributed new parts to three tracks at studios in Leeds, UK and Woodstock, USA, and the set includes an 11,000 word essay. The album is the sixth Quintessence project Harper has worked on with Hux, other releases including Cosmic Energy: Live At St Pancras 1970 (2009), Infinite Love: Live at Queen Elizabeth Hall 1971 (2009) and Rebirth: Live At Glastonbury 2010 (2011).

From August 2015, Harper has primarily been working as an academic proofreader, with his own business Belfast Proofreading. He continues to be involved in musical projects of his own, occasional writing, and occasional reissue projects. In 2017 he self-published 'Echoes From Then: Glimpses of John McLaughlin 1959-75', a companion volume to 'Bathed in Lightning' comprising material omitted from the parent volume along with substantial new research, including 10,000 words on McLaughlin's first professional band, Big Pete Deuchar & the Professors of Ragtime (1959–60).

Since 2019, alongside proofreading, Harper has been increasingly involved in curating vintage music box sets for various labels - Repertoire, Madfish, Cherry Red and Earth. Examples include exhaustive 'Live at the BBC' sets by Colosseum, the Pretty Things and Nucleus for Repertoire. In late 2021, he began a collaborative album recording project with Ardboe, Co. Tyrone, singer Breige Devlin, featuring an array of Irish musicians.

Examples of his journalism can be found at subscription website Rock's Backpages.

== Bibliography ==
=== Books ===
- Harper, Colin (2000). Dazzling Stranger: Bert Jansch and the British folk and blues revival. London: Bloomsbury.
  - — (2006). Dazzling Stranger: Bert Jansch and the British folk and blues revival. New ed. London: Bloomsbury.
  - (2011) Dazzling Stranger: Bert Jansch and the British folk and blues revival. 2nd revision & ebook edition. London: Bloomsbury.
- Seaside Rock (2003) Bangor: North Down Heritage Centre.
- Irish Folk, Trad and Blues: A Secret History (Collins Press, 2004) – Colin Harper & Trevor Hodgett.
- Bathed in Lightning: John McLaughlin, the 60s and the Emerald Beyond (2014) – print edition & expanded ebook – London: Jawbone Press.
- Bathed In Lightning: Bonus Chapters & Appendices: John McLaughlin, the 60s and the Emerald Beyond (2014) – stand-alone ebook of bonus content) London: Jawbone Press.
- The Wheels of The World: 300 Years of Irish Uilleann Pipers (Jawbone Press, 2015) – print edition only – Colin Harper with John McSherry.
- Eyes Wide Open: True Tales of a Wishbone Ash Warrior (Jawbone Press, 2015) – print edition and ebook – Andy Powell with Colin Harper.
- Echoes From Then: Glimpses of John McLaughlin 1959-75 (Market Square, 2017) - a self-published companion volume to 'Bathed in Lightning'

Albums

- Freedom & The Dream Penguin (2007) as 'The Field Mouse Conspiracy'
- Titanium Flag (2010)
- Sunset Cavaliers (Market Square, 2016)
- Titanium Flag (Market Square, 2017) - remastered and expanded edition

Singles

- Smash the System (Market Square, 2018) - as 'Colin Harper's Bourgeois Fury featuring Petesy Burns', a protest song about Northern Ireland MLA pay with punk legend Petesy Burns
- Make Your Own World (Market Square, 2019) - a homage to Bert Jansch
- Northern Irish Politicians (digital self-release, 2020) - as 'Bourgeois Fury featuring Dave McLarnon', another commentary on Northern Irish politicians

=== Articles ===
- Harper, Colin (December 2014). "Rory Gallagher: requiem for a guitar hero". Mojo. Vol. 253, no. 6. pp. 116–117.
- Harper, Colin (30 September 2015) 'Stereophonics: It was never about celebrities or fame'. Irish Times.
