= Flibbertigibbet =

Middle English and slang term

Flibbertigibbet is a Middle English word referring to a flighty or whimsical person. In modern use, it is used as a slang term, especially in Yorkshire, England for a gossipy or overly talkative person.

== Etymology ==
Its origin may lie in a meaningless representation of chattering.

== In literature and culture ==
This word also has a historical use as a name for a fiend, devil, or spirit. In the 15th-century English morality play The Castle of Perseverance, the Bad Angel addresses the vice figure Detraccio (also called Backbiter and the messenger of the World) as Flyprgebet (line 1724). In William Shakespeare's King Lear (IV, i (1605)), he is one of the five fiends that Edgar claimed was possessing him, this one in the posture of beggar Tom o' Bedlam. Shakespeare got the name from Samuel Harsnett's Declaration of Egregious Popish Impostures (1603), where one reads of 40 fiends that Jesuits cast out and among which was Fliberdigibbet, described as one of "foure deuils of the round, or Morrice, whom Sara in her fits, tuned together, in measure and sweet ucadence."

It has been used by extension as a synonym for Puck. It is also used as a nickname for a character in Sir Walter Scott's Kenilworth, and has gained the meaning of an impish child. Victor Hugo made a 1828 theatrical adaptation of the novel Kenilworth titled Amy Robsart, where Flibbertigibet is one of the main characters in the story.

Flibbertigibbet similarly is featured as a name in a local legend about Wayland's Smithy. According to the tale, Flibbertigibbet was apprentice to Wayland the Smith and greatly exasperated his master. Eventually, Wayland threw Flibbertigibbet down the hill and into a valley, where he was transformed into a stone. Scott associates his Flibbertigibbet character in Kenilworth with Wayland Smith.

In 1942, author Roald Dahl wrote his first children's novel, The Gremlins, in which Gremlins were tiny men who lived on a Royal Air Force fighter aircraft. In the same novel, Dahl called the wives of gremlins "Fifinellas", their male children "Widgets", and their female children "Flibbertigibbets".

The nuns describe free-spirited Sister Maria as "A flibbertigibbet! A will-o'-the wisp! A clown!" in the show tune "Maria" from the 1959 Broadway musical The Sound of Music by Rodgers and Hammerstein, and in the subsequent 1965 movie.

In the 1969 book Slaughterhouse-Five by Kurt Vonnegut, Barbara Pilgrim, the daughter of the protagonist, is described as a "bitchy flibbertigibbet".

In the 1990 American romantic comedy film Joe Versus the Volcano, Meg Ryan's character Angelica refers to herself as a flibbertigibbet.

In the 2011 book Ready Player One, Art3mis, a famous female gunter and blogger, refers to herself as a Flibbertigibbet upon meeting the protagonist.

In 2018, British Author Chris Redmile released a children's book titled The Flibber-ti-gibbet, a read in rhyme book designed to educate children about the traits of ADHD.

In 2022, British politician Lord Cormack referred to Michael Gove as a "Flibbertigibbet" following disputes over the relocation of the House of Lords.
