= Kevin Brady (musician) =

Irish jazz drummer and educator

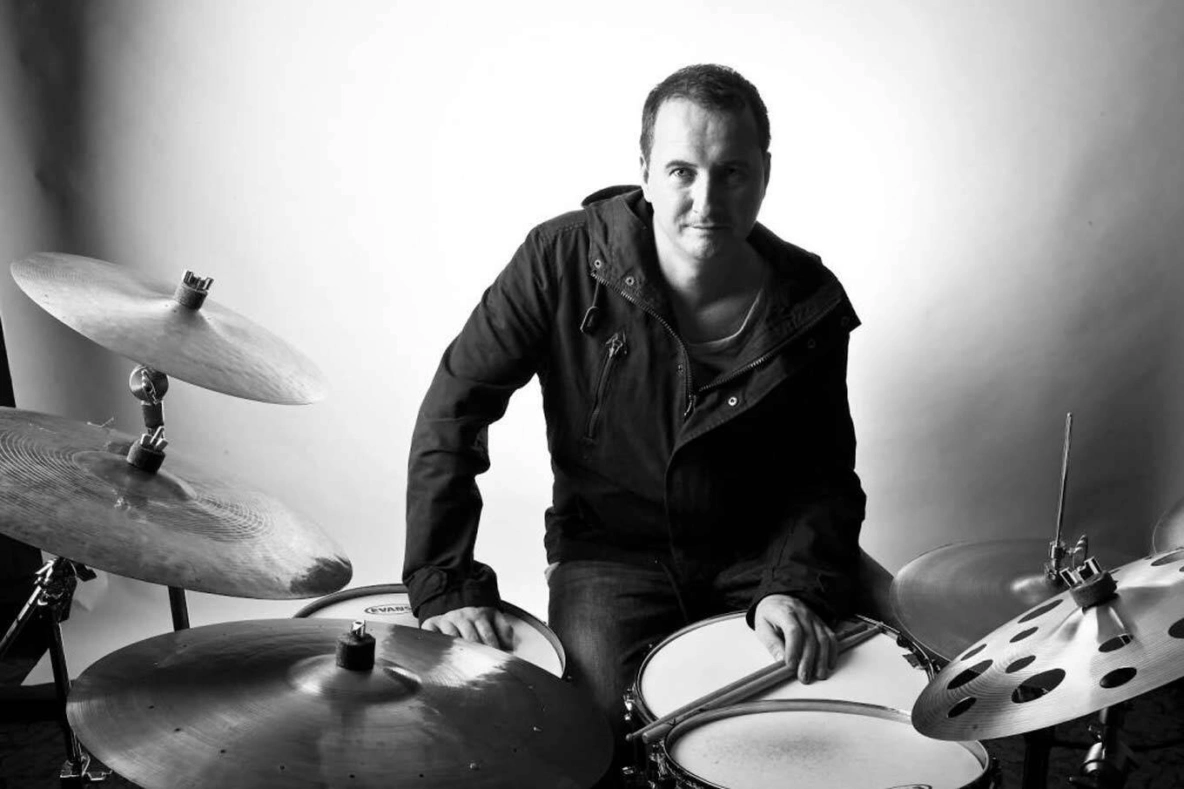
- Kevin Brady, 2023

Background information
- Born: Kevin Brady; 23 January 1974 (age 51); Dublin, Ireland
- Genres: Jazz
- Occupation(s): Drummer, composer, educator
- Instrument: Drums
- Years active: 1990s–present
- Labels: Ubuntu Music, LPR
- Website: kevinbrady.ie

Kevin Brady (born 23 January 1974) is an Irish jazz drummer, composer and music educator.

== Early life and education ==
Brady was born in Dublin. He studied classical piano and trumpet in childhood, later turning to drums. He trained at the Newpark Academy of Music and the Drummers Collective in New York. He holds a master's degree from the Cork School of Music and a performance diploma from the Guildhall School of Music and Drama.

== Career ==
Brady co-founded the Hammond organ trio Organics in 1997, which received the Young Musicwide Award. He later formed the Kevin Brady Trio with pianist Bill Carrothers and bassist Dave Redmond. In 2019, the ensemble expanded into the Kevin Brady Electric Quartet, which released the album Plan B in 2021.

He has performed with musicians such as Seamus Blake, Peter Bernstein, Norma Winstone, Van Morrison, and Larry Coryell. His appearances include international festivals and venues such as the Sydney Opera House and Ronnie Scott's Jazz Club.

== Teaching ==
Brady serves as Head of Jazz at the Newpark Academy of Music and teaches in the BA in Jazz Performance and Contemporary Music at Dublin City University.

== Discography ==
- Common Ground (LPR, 2011)
- Ensam (LPR, 2016)
- Zeitgeist (LPR, 2019)
- Plan B (Ubuntu Music, 2021)

== Reception ==
Plan B received four-star reviews from The Irish Times and DownBeat magazine, with 4.5 stars in the latter. All About Jazz also reviewed the album positively.

== Gallery ==
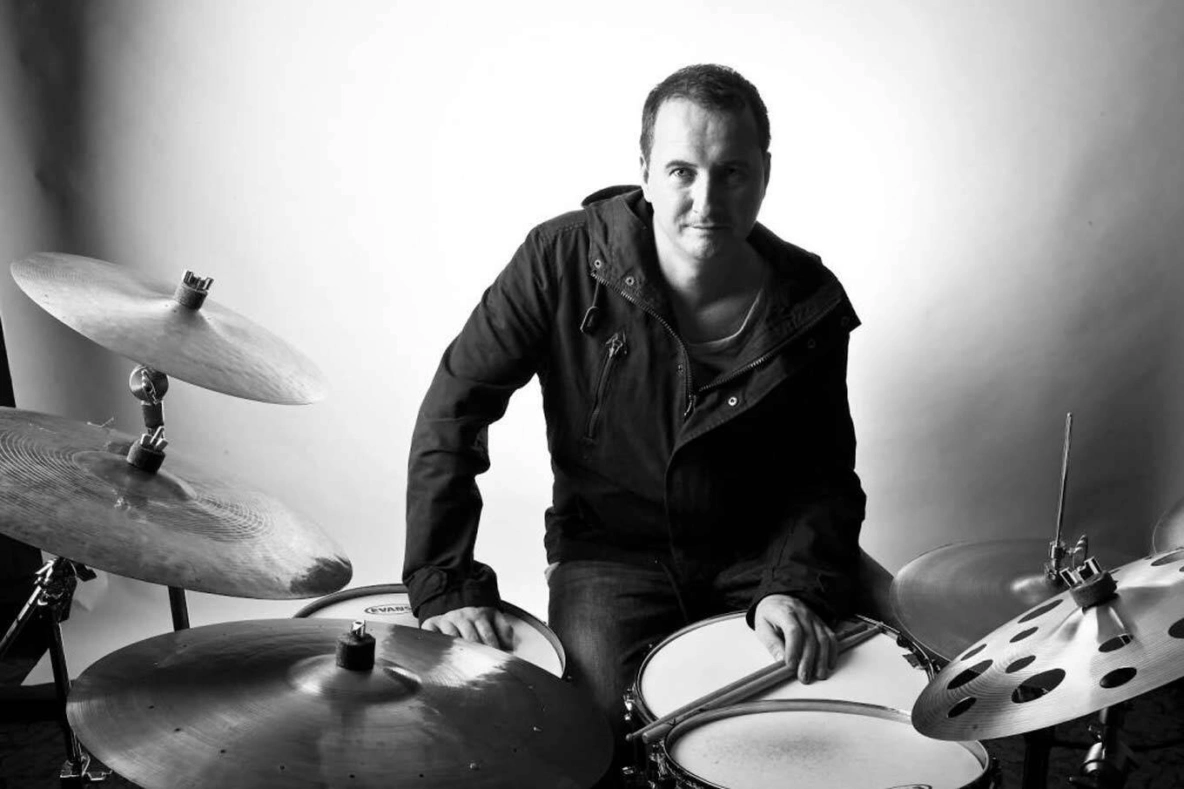
Kevin Brady, 2023

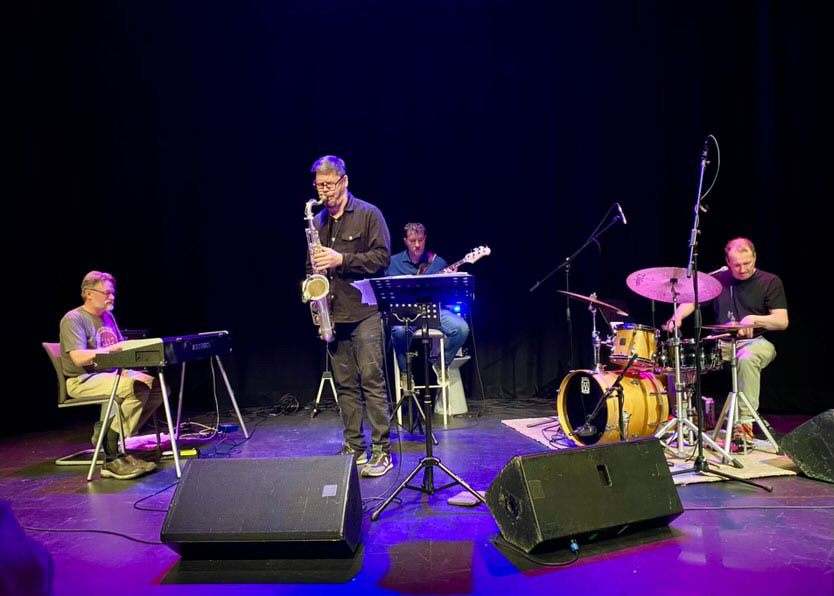
Kevin Brady Electric Quartet performing live
