= Adam Leonard (singer-songwriter) =

British singer-songwriter

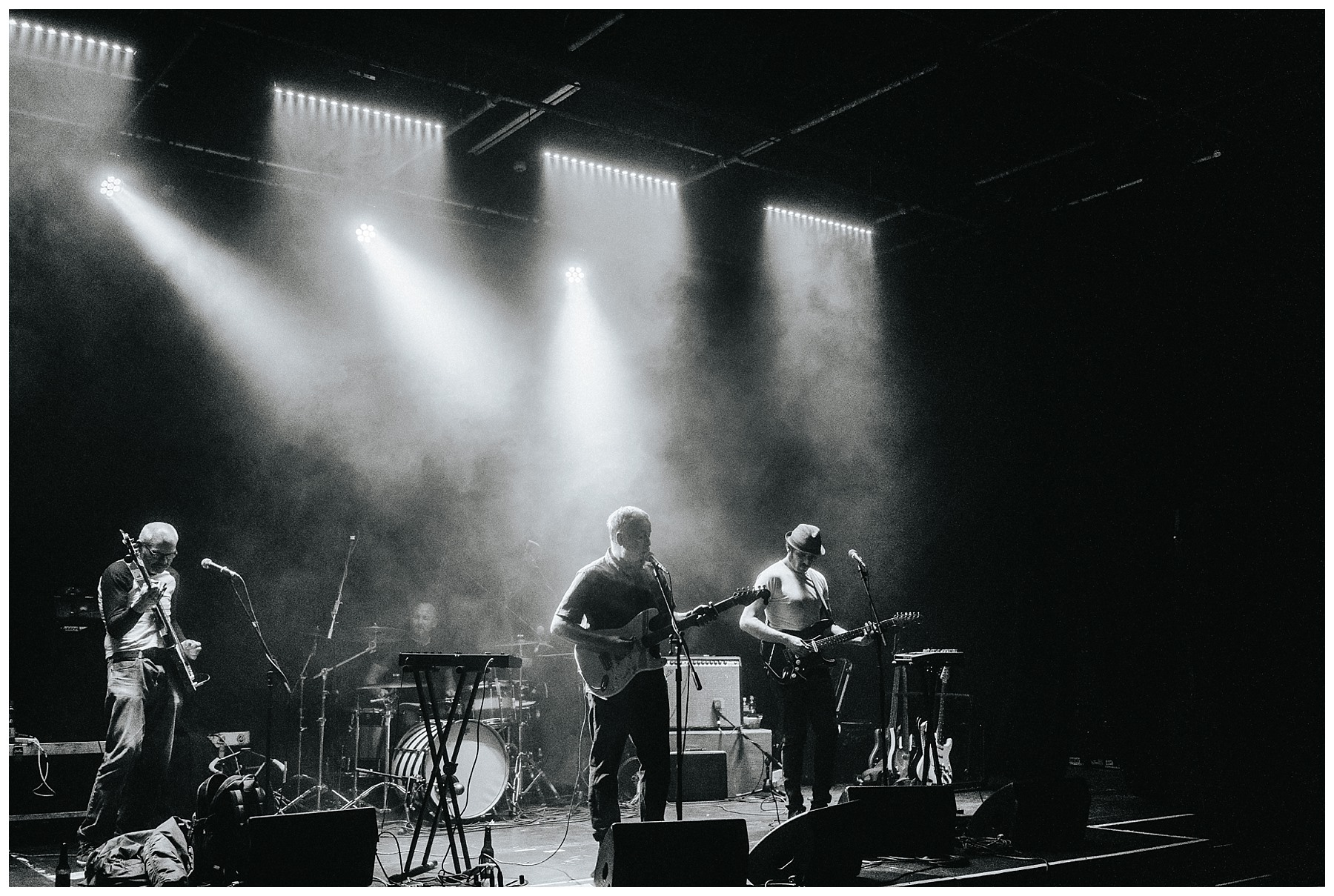
- Adam Leonard (centre) playing with Invaderband in 2017.

Background information
- Born: 27 March 1969 (age 57); Manchester, England
- Genres: Electronic music Folk music Art rock Ambient music
- Instruments: Vocals; Acoustic Guitar; Electric Guitar; Mandolin; Dulcimer; Harmonium; Synthesizer; Keyboards; Percussion
- Years active: 2000–present
- Labels: Real Wood; Apport; Bottled Music; The Great Pop Supplement; Folkwit Records; Rif Mountain; The Northwestern Series; Tectona Grandis; Polytechnic Youth; Reckless Records; Glasstone; Castles In Space; The Dark Outside / TDO Cassettes; Bibliotapes; Western Hemlock; Feral Child
- Member of: Invaderband

== Biography ==
Adam Leonard (born 27 March 1969) is an English singer-songwriter working mainly in the folk, Art rock and electronic music fields. Since his debut album in 2003, he has released many singles, EPs and albums on numerous labels.

Leonard has also created music under various monikers such as A Farewell To Hexes, Echoes In Rows, and his band project, Invaderband

Between 2003 and 2010 Leonard released the albums 'How Music Sounds', 'Leonardism' and 'Nature Recordings', the latter featuring P.G. Six and Steven Collins of The Owl Service.

In 2011, Leonard provided the soundtrack to Claudia Heindel's award-winning independent film, Lucky Seven. In 2012, Nature Recordings was issued on CD by Manchester-based label The Northwestern Series.

In 2012 Leonard formed Invaderband, a four-piece "Artrock/Garagerock/Krautrock" group and began gigging locally around Northern Ireland, including a slot at Other Voices in 2014. Occasional solo gigs still took place, including opening for Nick Harper.

Leonard was the winner of UK City of Culture 2013 Resonate Award for Best Song ("My Love").

In 2014, he embarked on the Octopus Project releasing eight albums over an eight-month period. In 2015, Invaderband released two singles ("The Implausible Man" and "Attack of the Pod People"), the latter making the BBC 6 Music playlist in December 2015. Invaderband's debut album was released in January 2017. In September 2017, the Invaderband album was shortlisted for the Northern Ireland Music Prize

In 2018, Leonard released a solo 7" single "Entkommen", on the Polytechnic Youth label, and also collaborated with Irish/French/New York band, Warriors Of The Dystotheque, on the I Know You'll Never Die EP released by Dublin's Reckless Records. The two main tracks were remixed by Le Galaxie and Richard March of Bentley Rhythm Ace.

In January 2021 a new Invaderband album was announced via invaderband.com. The first single from the album 'I Won't Remember You' was released on March 12

Invaderband's 2nd album "Peter Gabriel" was released September 2021. The sleeve was a painting of Peter Gabriel by Luke Haines. The band played the Other Voices festival in November and the album received national radio play in the UK and Ireland, favourable reviews, and ended up in a number of ‘Best albums of 2021’ lists

Leonard's solo electronic album "Rendlesham" was released on cassette by The Dark Outside late 2021, and on vinyl by Polytechnic Youth July 2022. The album was reviewed by The Quietus and Fortean Times

A 7" single 'Dark Dog' was released on Christmas Day 2022. Since then Leonard has been focussed on the A Farewell To Hexes electronic project, with various releases in 2025 and 2026, and the follow-up to the 'Rendlesham' album (entitled 'Todmorden') scheduled for release in 2027.

== Awards ==
- 2013 - UK City Of Culture (Derry~Londonderry): Resonate, Best Song - Winner - 'My Love'
- 2017 - Northern Ireland Music Prize: Album Of The Year - Shortlisted (Final 12) 'Invaderband' by Invaderband
- 2020 - Electronic Sound Magazine 2020 awards: Compilation Of The Year - Winner - for 'The Isolation Tapes'
- 2021 - Northern Ireland Music Prize: Single Of The Year - Shortlisted (Final 8) 'I Won't Remember You'
- 2022 - Northern Ireland Music Prize: Album Of The Year - Shortlisted (Final 12) 'Peter Gabriel' by Invaderband

== Selected discography ==
- How Music Sounds album, 2003 (Real Wood, RW010)
- How Real Is Real? mini-album, 2004 (Apport)
- Sgt. Pepper remake, 2005 (joint release by Real Wood/Bottled Music, BOTLP22).
- Leonardism album, 2007 (RW021) (Real Wood, RW021)
- It Happened on a Day 10" EP, 2007 (Great Pop Supplement, GPS23)
- Dan & Headless Bill – REDLIP mini-album, 2008 (Real Wood) – reissued by Folkwit Records, 2011
- To Give Up You Have To Bloody Start Live EP, 2008 (Real Wood, RW023)
- Nature Recordings vinyl LP, 2010 (Great Pop Supplement, GPS64)
- The View From A Hill, with The Owl Service, 2010 (Rif Mountain, RM-004)
- Nature Recordings CD album, 2012 (The Northwestern Series, Pendle 01)
- The Man Of Lists with Pulco, 2012 (Folkwit Records, f0079)
- Click Click Drone EP (by Echoes In Rows), 2013 (Tectona Grandis, TEAK01)
- Songs For Abandoned Tube Stations by Relycs, 3-track cassette EP, 2013 (No label)
- Sightings EP, as A Farewell To Hexes, 2013 (Tectona Grandis, TEAK02)
- Yesterday, Perhaps (Songs Of The Kitchen Cynics) V/A compilation, 2013 (Les Enfants Du Paradiddle, ENF100)
- Octopus Part 1 download album, 2014 (self-release via bandcamp)
- Octopus Part 2 download album, 2014 (self-release via bandcamp)
- Octopus Part 3 download album, 2014 (self-release via bandcamp)
- Octopus Part 4 download album, 2014 (self-release via bandcamp)
- Octopus Part 5 download album, 2014 (self-release via bandcamp)
- Octopus Part 6 download album, 2015 (self-release via bandcamp)
- Octopus Part 7 download album, 2015 (self-release via bandcamp)
- Octopus Part 8 download album, 2015 (self-release via bandcamp)
- Invaderband "The Implausible Man" 2 track CD single, 2015 (self-release)
- Invaderband "Attack of the Pod People" 3 track CD single, 2015 (self-release)
- Last Night I Dreamt Of Hibrihteselle with Richard Moult, 2015 (Wild Silence, WS008/WS09)
- Invaderband "Invaderband" – self-titled debut album (LP/CD) (Tectona Grandis, TEAK005LP / TEAK005CD), 2017
- Entkommen Parts 1 & 2 - 7" single (Polytechnic Youth, PY64), 2018
- Octopus Part 9 download album, 2018 (self-release via bandcamp)
- I Know You'll Never Die EP with Warriors Of The Dystotheque (Reckless Records, RR38), 2018
- Things In The Shadows EP with Warriors Of The Dystotheque (Glasstone Records), 2019
- Rooms album from United Bible Studies, 2019 (currently unreleased)
- It's Another Christmas - single, (self-release via bandcamp) 2019
- The Isolation Tapes V/A compilation (Castles In Space, CIS062MC), 2020
- Invaderband "I Won't Remember You" single (Tectona Grandis, TEAK09), 2021
- Invaderband "Handcuffed Man Shoots Himself" single (Tectona Grandis, TEAK10), 2021
- A Farewell To Hexes "Rendlesham" (TDO Cassettes, TDO042), 2021
- Invaderband "Peter Gabriel" album - LP, CD, digital (Tectona Grandis, TEAK11), 2021
- Invaderband "Cheese Slices" single (Tectona Grandis, TEAK14), 2022
- A Farewell To Hexes "Rendlesham" LP (Polytchnic Youth, PY160), 2022
- Echoes In Rows 'Click Click Drone' mini-album (Tectona Grandis, TEAK16), 2022
- Octopus Part 10 download album (self-release via bandcamp), 2022
- Adam Leonard 'Dark Dog' 7" single (Western Hemlock, WH002), 2022
- A Farewell To Hexes 'Zigmund' (self-release via bandcamp), 2025
- A Farewell To Hexes 'The Halt Tape In Colour: Rendlesham Expanded' CD (Tectona Grandis, TEAK08), 2025
- A Farewell To Hexes 'The Eyewall' 2-track single on 5" red lathe-cut vinyl (Feral Child, FC86), 2026
- A Farewell To Hexes 'The Eyewall' 3-track EP on CD (Tectona Grandis, TEAK19), 2026
- Adam Leonard 'Low Hanging Fruit' limited 7" single / digital (self-release via bandcamp), 2026
