= Laura Sheeran =

Irish singer, musician, composer and artist

Laura Sheeran (born 1987 or 1988) is an Irish singer, musician, composer and artist. She was born in Galway and is the cousin of Ed Sheeran. She married Marc Aubele, keyboardist with Bell X1, in 2014.

Together with Aubele, she is an instrumentalist and singer with 'Nanu Nanu'. Aside from her solo career, she has performed with Fovea Hex, having been recruited for the group by Clodagh Simonds and is now also a member of RESOUND, a Dublin-based musical collective put together by Kate Ellis in 2011.

Sheeran sings and performs on a loop station, bowed saw, melodica, accordion, flute, ukulele, and used a TC Helicon Voice Live 2 to manipulate her vocals and create harmonies. She frequently incorporates improvisation into her performances.

Musicians with whom she has performed include Cora Venus Lunny and Marc Aubele.

== Solo discography ==
- Music for the Deep Woods, EP, 2010
- To The Depths, EP, 2010
- Lust of Pig & The Fresh Blood, double album 2011* Murderous Love, nine track EP, 2011
- What The World Knows, single album 2012

== Other works ==
=== Theatre music ===
- Rural Electric (2004) – Written and directed by John Nee. Original music composed and performed by Laura Sheeran
- The Mental (2006) – Written by John Nee, directed by John Nee & Ray Yeats. Original music composed and performed by Laura Sheeran & Nuala Ní Channain
- Limavady, My Heart's Delight (2006) – Written and directed by John Nee. Original music composed and performed by Laura Sheeran . Role of 'Phillis' also acted by Laura Sheeran
- An T-Amhráin Briste(2007) – Written and directed by John Nee. Original music composed by Laura Sheeran and John Nee, performed by John Nee, Laura Sheeran, Chaoimhe Connolly

=== Film music ===
- The Tragic Tale of Arthur King The Last (2005) – Directed by Barry Richardson. Original music by Laura Sheeran
- Mr. Skin (2006) – Written and Directed by Barry Richardson. Original music by Laura Sheeran
- Bad Habit (2007) – Written and Directed by Heather Mills. Original music by Laura Sheeran
- Natural Traditions (2010) – Produced by Bridget Sheeran in collaboration with the Community Midwives Association. Original music by Laura Sheeran
- Echo (2012) – Written and Directed by Ela Gas. Original music by Laura Sheeran
