= Dublin Philharmonic Orchestra =

Orchestra conducted by Derek Gleeson

The Dublin Philharmonic Orchestra (DPO)
- Orchestra
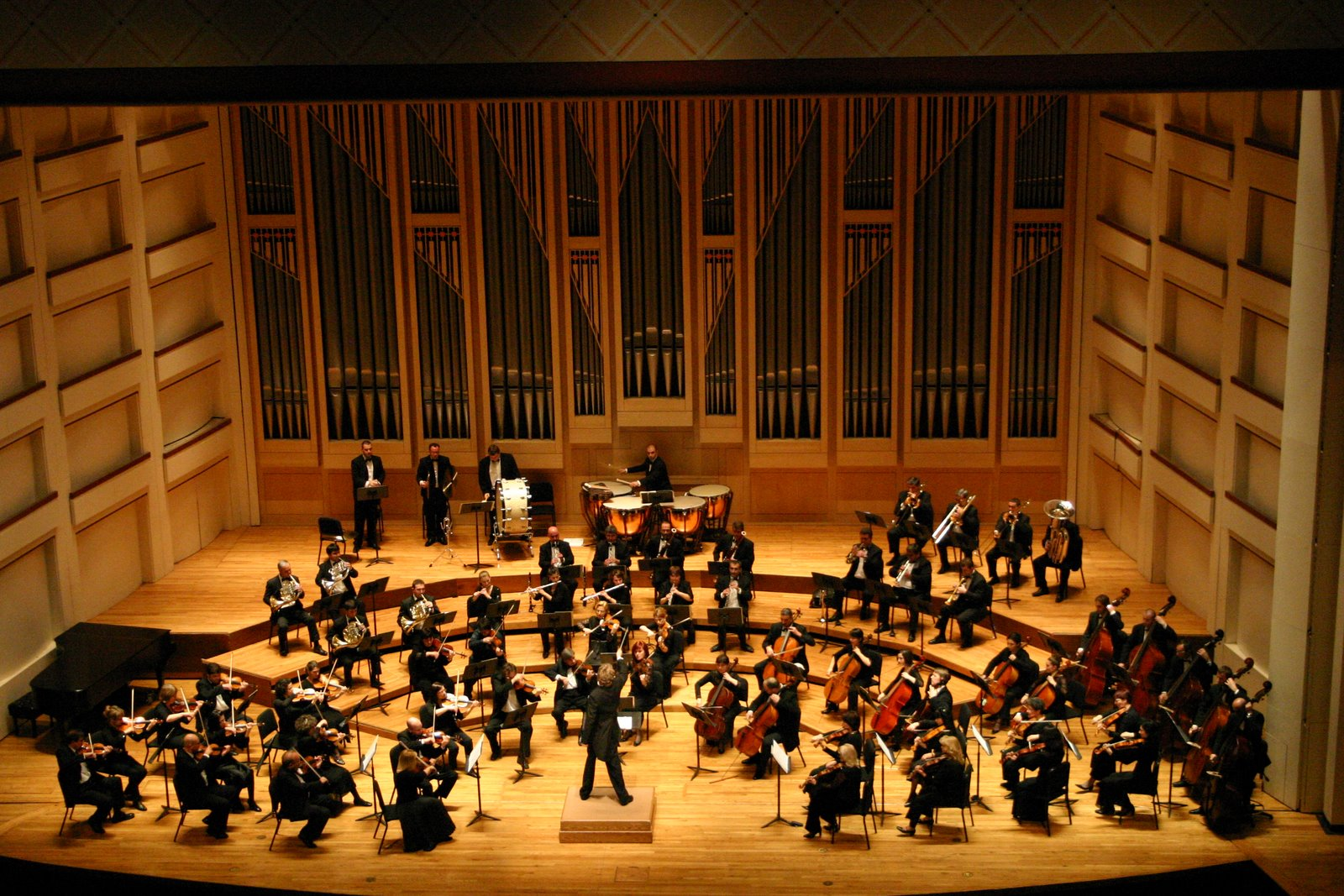
- Dublin Philharmonic Orchestra
- Founded: 1997
- Principal conductor: Derek Gleeson
- Website: www.dublinphilharmonic.com

The Dublin Philharmonic Orchestra (DPO) is an orchestra based in Dublin, Ireland. It was founded in 1997 and operates under the auspices of the Dublin Philharmonic Orchestra Association, a corporation limited by guarantee and Irish charity, The former Dublin Philharmonic Orchestra was active from the 18th century to the 1930s. The famous violinist, conductor and impresario Pierre Van Maldere conducting from 1751. The present music director and conductor is Derek Gleeson.

== Activities ==
The new Dublin Philharmonic Orchestra gave its premier concert during the 1997 Kilkenny Arts Festival at the 13th century Norman cathedral, "St. Canices", in the ancient city of Kilkenny. In addition to performing a repertoire of standard classical masterworks, the orchestra gives a voice to Ireland's contemporary composers. The orchestra has recorded classical and contemporary repertoire for commercial record companies, including Albany Records (U.S.A.), BMG/Windham Hill Records, and in 2006 was featured on the Contemporary Music Centre of Ireland's "Contemporary Music from Ireland, Volume Six" CD in a recording of Baginbun 1170 by the composer Vincent Kennedy. Additionally, the orchestra has recorded film scores for motion pictures and television.

In 2008, the DPO performed at "The World Fleadh", Ireland's largest Celtic music festival with Frankie Gavin & De Dannan, Moya Brennan, Brian Kennedy and Anthony Kearns of the Three Irish Tenors.

In 2009, it undertook its inaugural tour of the United States of America with 49-concert dates across 24 states, under the auspices of Columbia Artists Management Inc., In 2010 it toured China, performing at the official Shanghai Grand Theatre World Expo 2010 program. It also opened the Beijing Summer Festival, Roam about the Classics, with concerts broadcast from the National Centre for the Performing Arts at the Opera House,(NCPA) Beijing, on TV, Radio and the Internet to over 400 million people.

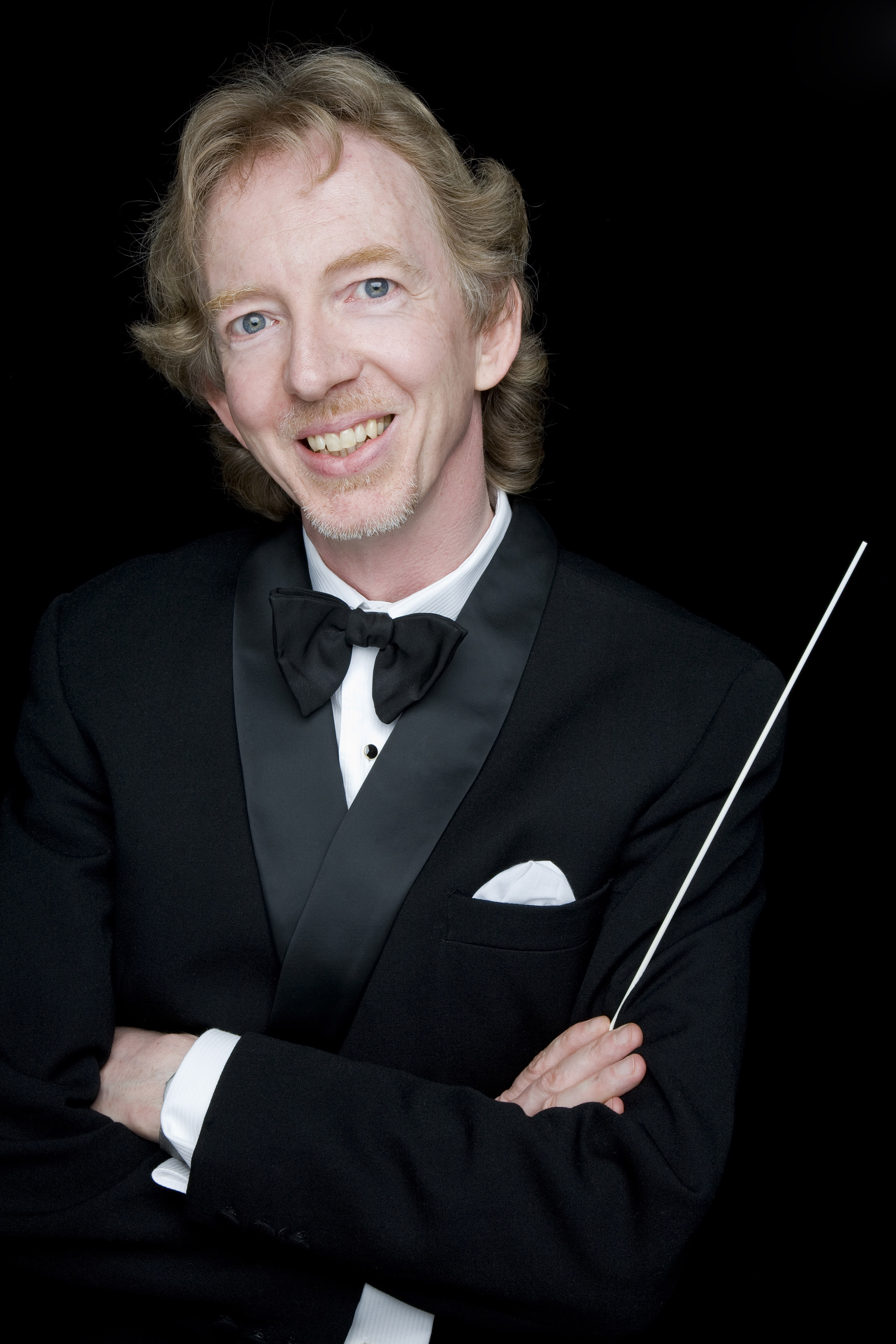
Music Director & Conductor Derek Gleeson

The Hong Kong-based, Phoenix Television Station, made a documentary about the Orchestra's China Tour of 2010.

In 2010, the DPO teamed up with Samuel L. Jackson, the Samuel Jackson Foundation and Dionne Warwick in presenting a gala fundraising event for Irish Autism Action at the O'Reilly Hall at University College Dublin.

In January 2016 the Dublin Philharmonic made its second tour of China.

== Composition and membership ==
The DPO is an International Orchestra drawing its orchestral players principally from the RTE National Symphony Orchestra (the orchestra of the Irish national radio network), the Irish Chamber Orchestra, Camerata Ireland, the Ulster Orchestra, the RTE Concert Orchestra, as well as select players from the pool of Dublin-based freelance musicians. The musicians pursue parallel careers as international soloists, members of eminent chamber groups, and as tutors and professors of music. Its Founder, Music Director and Conductor is Derek Gleeson.

Chamber music instrumentalists of the Dublin Philharmonic Orchestra also perform as the "Irish Chamber Ensemble" under DPO's associate conductor Malcolm Yuen.
