= List of Irish musicians =

This is a list of Irish musicians and musical groups.

== Jazz and Blues ==
- Paddy Cole (1939–2025) musician and bandleader
- Rory Gallagher (1948–1995), guitarist, singer and songwriter
- Josephine Alexandra Mitchell (1903–1995) was Ireland's first female saxophonist.
- Louis Stewart (1944–2016), guitarist

== Opera ==
- Aimee Banks, soprano
- Margaret Burke Sheridan (1889–1958), regarded as Ireland's second prima donna
- Norma Burrowes, coloratura soprano
- Celine Byrne, soprano
- Veronica Dunne (1927–2021), soprano
- Tara Erraught, mezzo-soprano
- Bernadette Greevy (1940–2008), soprano
- Catherine Hayes (1818–1861), once described as the Madonna of her day
- Josef Locke (1917–1999), tenor
- John McCormack (1884–1945), tenor
- Paula Murrihy, mezzo-soprano
- Regina Nathan, soprano
- Cara O'Sullivan (1962–2021), coloratura soprano
- Frank Patterson (1938–2000), tenor
- Ailish Tynan, soprano
- The Irish Tenors

== Musicians and Producers ==
- Séamus Begley (1949-2023)
- Mary Bergin
- Phil Coulter
- Séamus Ennis (1919-1982)
- James Galway
- Frankie Gavin
- David Holmes
- Jacknife Lee
- Pat McCarthy
- Máire McDonnell-Garvey
- Liam O'Flynn (1945-2018)
- Seán Ó Riada
- Luan Parle
- Tommy Peoples (1948-2018)
- Sharon Shannon

== Singers ==
- Chloë Agnew
- Kerri Ann
- Lindsay Armaou
- Rachael Baptist
- Billie Barry
- Margaret Barry
- Big Tom
- Wallis Bird
- Frances Black
- Mary Black
- Tara Blaise
- Brigid Boden
- Liz Bonnin
- Bono
- Paul Brady
- Gearóidín Bhreathnach
- Máire Breatnach
- Brídín Brennan
- Moya Brennan
- Rose Brennan
- Bry
- Jessie Buckley
- Mairead Buicke
- Jake Burns
- Mary Byrne
- Patricia Cahill
- Máiréad Carlin
- Karan Casey
- Mary Cassidy
- Maria Christian
- Liam Clancy
- Rita Connolly
- Sammy Copley
- Andrea Corr
- Caroline Corr
- Sharon Corr
- Briana Corrigan
- Mary Coughlan
- Gemma Craven
- Elizabeth Cronin
- Laura Cunningham
- Cathy Davey
- Muriel Day
- Peggy Dell
- Christy Dignam
- Kiera Dignam
- Cara Dillon
- Julie-Anne Dineen
- Ryan Dolan
- Eileen Donaghy
- Leslie Dowdall
- Ronnie Drew
- Mary Duff
- Gemma Dunleavy
- Pecker Dunne
- Kathy Durkin
- Kian Egan
- Enya
- Naisrín Elsafty
- Róisín Elsafty
- Lucia Evans
- Siobhan Fahey
- Órla Fallon
- Angela Farrell
- Julie Feeney
- Geraldine Fitzgerald
- Nadia Forde
- Bridie Gallagher
- Bronagh Gallagher
- Rory Gallagher
- Orla Gartland
- Rea Garvey
- Bob Geldof
- Gloria
- Bernadette Greevy
- Carmel Gunning
- Lisa Hannigan
- Gemma Hayes
- Margaret Healy
- Una Healy
- Lynn Hilary
- Niall Horan
- Roberta Howett
- Hozier
- Nina Hynes
- Sarimah Ibrahim
- Laura Izibor
- Jazzy
- Helena Jessie
- John Henry Johnstone
- Sandie Jones
- Tracey K
- Hazel Kaneswaran
- Niamh Kavanagh
- Dolores Keane (1953-2026)
- Rita Keane
- Ronan Keating
- Aebh Kelly
- Lisa Kelly
- Luke Kelly
- Maite Kelly
- Dermot Kennedy
- Nuala Kennedy
- Virginia Kerr
- Margaret Keys
- Katie Kim
- Michelle Lally
- Lisa Lambe
- Lasairfhíona
- Barbara Law
- Jackie Lee
- Tara Lee
- Maxine Linehan
- Sinéad Lohan
- Edele Lynch
- Keavy Lynch
- Nonie Lynch
- Phil Lynott
- Shane MacGowan
- Sinéad Madden
- Cathy Maguire
- Tommy Makem (1931-2007)
- Margo
- Maxi
- Imelda May
- MayKay
- Cathal McConnell
- Eleanor McEvoy
- Geraldine McGowan
- Liam McCay
- Maria McCool
- Lisa McHugh
- Susan McKeown
- Éabha McMahon
- Geraldine McMahon
- Katie McMahon
- Tara McNeill
- Christy Moore
- Gary Moore
- Fiach Moriarty
- Van Morrison
- Caitlín Maude
- Leanne Moore
- Robin Morton (1939-2021)
- Samantha Mumba
- Mundy
- Delia Murphy
- Majella Murphy
- Róisín Murphy
- Ann Murray
- Elaine Murtagh
- Regina Nathan
- Ciara Newell
- Niamh Ní Charra
- Sibéal Ní Chasaide
- Máire Ní Chathasaigh
- Maighread Ní Dhomhnaill
- Aoife Ní Fhearraigh
- Máire Ní Ghuairim
- Sorcha Ní Ghuairim
- Liam Ó Maonlaí
- Méav Ní Mhaolchatha
- Mairéad Ní Mhaonaigh
- Nóirín Ní Riain
- Aoibhinn Ní Shúilleabháin
- Nóra Ní Shíndile
- Eithne Ní Uallacháin
- Pádraigín Ní Uallacháin
- Muireann Nic Amhlaoibh
- Bernie Nolan
- Linda Nolan
- Róisín O
- Fiachna Ó Braonáin
- Siobhán O'Brien
- Lucy O'Byrne
- Sinéad O'Carroll
- Maura O'Connell
- Sinéad O'Connor
- Alison O'Donnell
- Daniel O'Donnell
- Danny O'Donoghue
- Máirín O'Donovan
- Maeve O'Donovan
- Áine O'Dwyer
- Stiofán Ó Fearail
- Mary O'Hara
- Maureen O'Hara
- Caitríona O'Leary
- Lisa O'Neill
- Annmarie O'Riordan
- Dolores O'Riordan
- Ryan O'Shaughnessy
- Camille O'Sullivan
- Gilbert O'Sullivan
- Cara O'Sullivan
- Úna Palliser
- Niamh Parsons
- Niamh Perry
- Maureen Potter
- Carmel Quinn
- Clare Quinn
- Eimear Quinn
- Eileen Reid
- John Reilly
- Liam Reilly
- Tina Reynolds
- Claire Roche
- Lesley Roy
- Maverick Sabre
- Tina Scala
- Dana Rosemary Scallon
- Pauline Scanlon
- Ann Scott
- Eleanor Shanley
- Deirdre Shannon
- Fionnuala Sherry
- Laura Sheeran
- Sinéad Sheppard
- Clodagh Simonds
- Alex Sharpe
- Kasey Smith
- Claire Sproule
- Lisa Stanley
- Mary Staunton
- Molly Sterling
- Heidi Talbot
- Christine Tobin
- Tríona Ní Dhomhnaill
- Veda
- Dylan Walshe
- Shayne Ward
- Kathleen Watkins
- Colm Wilkinson
- Rebecca Winckworth
- Gráinne Yeats

== Bands ==
- The 4 of Us
- A House
- The Academic
- The Adventures
- Agnelli & Nelson
- An Emotional Fish
- Ash
- Aslan
- B*Witched
- Bagatelle
- Bellefire
- Bell X1
- Belters Only
- Bicep
- The Blades
- Blink
- Boomtown Rats
- Boyzone
- The Chieftains
- The Clancy Brothers
- Clannad
- The Cranberries
- The Coronas
- The Corrs
- Cry Before Dawn
- The Divine Comedy
- The Dubliners
- Engine Alley
- The Fatima Mansions
- Fight Like Apes
- Fontaines D.C.
- The Frank and Walters
- The Fureys
- The Frames
- Ham Sandwich
- Hothouse Flowers
- Horslips
- Inhaler
- JJ72
- Kerbdog
- Kingfishr
- Kneecap
- Kodaline
- Lankum
- Little Green Cars
- Makem and Clancy
- Mama's Boys
- Mellow Candle
- Microdisney
- My Bloody Valentine
- The Nolans
- Pillow Queens
- Planxty
- The Pogues
- Power of Dreams
- The Riptide Movement
- Sack
- The Script
- Shane MacGowan and The Popes
- Snow Patrol
- Soda Blonde
- Something Happens
- The Stars of Heaven
- Stiff Little Fingers
- The Stunning
- The Sultans of Ping
- Telefís
- Them
- Therapy?
- Thin Lizzy
- The Thrills
- Tír na nÓg
- Toasted Heretic
- Two Door Cinema Club
- U2
- The Undertones
- Villagers
- The Walls
- Westlife
- We Cut Corners
- Whipping Boy
- Wilt
- The Wolfe Tones

== Songwriters ==
- Luka Bloom
- Shay Healy
- "Galway Joe" Dolan
- Arthur Colahan
- Bob Geldof
- Brendan Graham
- Brendan Phelan
- Brian Murphy
- Brian Warfield
- Bry
- Carl Hession
- Carmel Gunning
- Cathal Coughlan
- Cathal O'Byrne
- Cathy Davey
- Cecil Sheridan
- Charles J. Dunphie
- Chris de Burgh
- Chris Singleton
- Christy Moore
- Ciara Newell
- Colm de Bhailís
- Colm Farrelly
- Damien Rice
- Danny O'Reilly
- Darren Holden
- Dave Couse
- David Downes
- David Virgin
- Den Hegarty
- Glen Hansard
- Dick Farrelly
- Dominic Behan
- Dominic Scott
- Don Mescall
- Dylan Walshe
- Ed Deane
- Ed Reavy
- Elaine Murtagh
- Fiach Moriarty
- Fiachra Trench
- Francis Fahy
- Frank O'Donovan
- Freddie White
- Gavin Friday
- George Desmond Hodnett
- Gilbert O'Sullivan
- Ian Callanan
- Jake Burns
- James Lynam Molloy
- Jay Pryor
- Jimmy Kennedy
- Joe Jewell
- John Keegan Casey
- John Kennedy
- Johnnie Fingers
- Johnny McCauley
- Johnny Patterson
- Johnny Tom Gleeson
- Jolyon Jackson
- Jonathan Kelly
- Jonathon Ng
- Josie McDermott
- Julie Feeney
- Karl Broderick
- Keith Getty
- Kevin Mooney
- Kian Egan
- Kieran O'Reilly
- Kiev Connolly
- Laura Sheeran
- Leo Maguire
- Liam Harrison
- Luka Bloom
- Marc Carroll
- Mark Geary
- Mark Feehily
- Martin McCann
- Martin Mulvihill
- Matt Hayward
- Michael Brunnock
- Michael McGinley
- Mícheál Ó Domhnaill (1951-2006)
- Mickey MacConnell (1947-2025)
- Mundy
- Neil Hannon
- Niall Breslin
- Niall Horan
- Niall Toner
- Nicky Byrne
- Noel Hogan
- Noelie McDonnell
- Nuala Kennedy
- Nucentz
- Paddy McGuigan
- Patrick Heeney
- Paul Casey
- Paul Kelly
- Paul Woodfull
- Peadar Kearney
- Pete Briquette
- Philip Gaston
- Pól Brennan
- Richey McCourt
- Riocard Bairéad
- Rob Smith
- Robbie O'Connell
- Roesy
- Roma Ryan
- Ronan Hardiman
- Rory Gallagher
- Ryan Sheridan
- Ryan Tubridy
- Samuel Lover
- Seamus Kennedy
- Sean McCarthy
- Shane Filan
- Shay Healy
- Siobhan Fahey
- Sonny Condell
- Suzanne Rhatigan
- Tara Lee
- Thomas Duffet
- Thomas Houston
- Thomas P. Keenan
- Tommy Makem
- Wellington Guernsey
