= 1992 in radio =

The year 1992 in radio involved some significant events.

== Events ==
- January - KUBE/Seattle completes its shift from Mainstream Top 40 to Rhythmic CHR.
- January 15 - AC-formatted KZOL/Salt Lake City flips to modern rock as KXRK.
- January 22 - Rebel forces occupy Zaire's national radio station in Kinshasa and broadcast a demand for the government's resignation.
- February - WPLJ in New York City completes its shift from Top 40 to hot adult contemporary. In addition, the station rebrands from "Mojo Radio" to the continuing "95-5 PLJ."
- February 12 - Washington, D.C. area Top 40 radio station WAVA-FM changes to a religious format, which continues permanently.
- February 18 - After over two decades as Baltimore's premier Top 40/CHR outlet (including a brief stint with disco and a few name and call letter changes), WBSB flips to Gold-based Hot AC as "Variety 104.3."
- February 18 - The "Young Country" format debuts with KRSR 105.3 in Dallas dropping its hot AC format to become KRRM. The KRRM calls stood for "The Armadillo," but were just a placeholder for the KYNG calls, which it would acquire from a station in Coos Bay, Oregon.
- February 21 - Associated Broadcasting Company is a radio station "Kool 106" (later 106.7 Dream FM) launched.
- March 4 - WIKZ in Chambersburg, Pennsylvania flips from Contemporary hit radio as "Z-95" to soft adult contemporary as "The New MIX95".
- April 20 - KKDJ/Fresno flips from album rock to modern rock.
- May 22 - KMMK/Las Vegas flips from adult contemporary to modern rock as KEDG.
- June 22 - Radio Wimbledon, the official radio station of the Wimbledon Championships (lawn tennis) in London, is launched.
- August 1 - The FCC relaxes its longstanding rule allowing ownership of only one station per service per market. The new rules allow two stations per service per market and spur a big round of consolidation that would cash out owners like Noble Broadcast Group, Malrite Communications, Shamrock Communications and TK Communications.
- September 7 - Classic FM (UK), a classical music broadcaster and Britain's first national commercial radio station, is launched.
- September 8 - KJJO in Minneapolis, Minnesota flips from modern rock to country music.
- October - Dallas/Ft. Worth gets its first duopoly as Alliance Broadcasting and KYNG take over KODZ "Oldies 94.9." The station is promptly flipped to a soft-leaning country format as KSNN "Sunny 95."
- October 15 - Commercial radio comes to the Channel Islands with the launch of Island FM, followed 10 days later by the start of Channel 103.
- October 26 - WAPW/Atlanta flips from CHR to Modern rock as "99X".
- November 1 - KOAI/Dallas-Fort Worth drops its smooth jazz format as "106.1 The Oasis" to bring top-40 back to the market as KHKS "106.1 Kiss FM" (KEGL had left the format in the summer). In response, KCDU "CD 107.5" switches from classic rock to smooth jazz a day later, picking up the KOAI call letters and "Oasis" moniker and firing PD Gary Reynolds, who had been hired just two weeks earlier.
- November 9 - WIBF/Philadelphia flips from ethnic to modern rock as "WDRE".
- Late November - WHTE-FM's new branding goes live and becomes 101.9 FM in the Charlottesville, Virginia, area.
- November - An appearance by survivor Christine Buckley on The Gay Byrne Show on RTÉ Radio 1 in the Irish Republic to discuss industrial schools brings an "overwhelming response" from others who feel they were victims of physical and emotional abuse in these institutions.
- December 23 - American humorist David Sedaris makes his National Public Radio debut reading a radio essay on Morning Edition titled "Santaland Diaries," based on his experiences as an elf at Macy's department store during Christmas in New York City. It is a success with listeners and makes his name.
- December 25 - KQLZ/Los Angeles drops their "Pirate Radio" branding and album rock format for modern rock as "100.3 FM."
- December 31 (01:00) - Radio Luxemburg ceases to broadcast English-language programming.

== Debuts ==
- January 4 - ESPN Radio debuts as a weekend service (under the name "SportsRadio ESPN"), with Keith Olbermann, Tony Bruno and Chuck Wilson among the first group of hosts for the flagship program GameNight.
- April - Country Countdown USA, a countdown program spotlighting the top 30 songs of the week, as reported by Radio & Records magazine. The show is hosted by Lon Helton, country editor for R&R, and features an in-studio interview with a currently popular country music singer or act.
- October 10 - Billboard reintroduces the Crossover chart publishing its last chart after nearly 22 months. This time it is renamed the Top 40/Rhythm-Crossover chart, which would later be christened as the Rhythmic Contemporary chart in 1997.

=== No dates ===
- WTCX in Lakeville, Minnesota signs on the air with a hot AC format.
- Armstrong & Getty show debuts

== Closings ==
- December 30 - English service of Radio Luxembourg closes down after 59 years of broadcasting.

== Deaths ==
- February 2 - Bert Parks, American actor, singer, and radio and television announcer (born 1914)
- February 4 - John Dehner, American actor in radio, television, and films (born 1915)
- February 15 - Marcos Rodriguez, Sr., Spanish radio pioneer, founder of KESS and Cuban entrepreneur (65)
- March 18 - Ed Prentiss, American actor in radio, perhaps best known for portraying the title role on the radio version of Captain Midnight (born 1909?)
- May 17 - Lawrence Welk, American musician, radio and television personality (born 1903)
- June 23 - Joy Nichols, Australian-born musical comedy performer, dies in United States (born 1925)
- July 9 - Eric Sevareid, American news reporter (born 1912)
- October 16 - Shirley Booth, award-winning American actress and radio personality (born 1898)

== See also ==
- radio broadcasting
