= Charles Dunphie =

Charles Dunphie may refer to:

- Charles J. Dunphie (1820–1908), Irish journalist, art and literary critic, songwriter and poet
- Sir Charles Anderson Lane Dunphie (1902–1999), officer of the British Army
