= Josephine Alexandra Mitchell =

Irish saxophonist

Josephine Alexandra "Zandra" Mitchell
- Born: Josephine Alexandra Mitchell; 22 July 1903; Dublin, Ireland
- Died: 23 November 1995 (aged 92); Donegal, Ireland
- Known for: saxophonist

Josephine Alexandra Mitchell (22 July 1903 – 23 November 1995) was Ireland's first female professional saxophonist. She performed under the stage name Zandra Mitchell and led her own band, Baby Mitchell and Her Queens of Jazz, based in Germany.

== Early life ==
Mitchell was born in 1903 in Phibsborough, Dublin to Gertrude Elizabeth Woodnut and Joseph Edwin Mitchell, conductor at the Theatre Royale and civil servant for the Ordnance Survey.

== Musical career ==
From a musical family she learned the saxophone when young and performed her first gig when she was 11. She became a headline act when her brother Eddie, also a musician, took her on tour in London.She took on the stage name Zandra which was also used by friends. She was offered a place in an all-girls band touring Switzerland and Germany by an agent in the city. This took her through Germany, where she settled in Berlin and witnessed to Hitler's rise to power. She played with legends like Coleman Hawkins and Jean ‘Django’ Reinhardt. Her all-female dance band was called Baby Mitchell and Her Queens of Jazz.

== Later personal life ==
While she was in Berlin she had a daughter she named Constance Alexandra. She gave the child up for adoption to a Russian couple. She eventually married a Belgian man to enable her to get out of Germany.

On her return to Ireland Mitchell lived in a house owned by the family in Rossnowlagh in Donegal, which she knew from childhood holidays. She spent the rest of her life living there, supposedly sleeping in the bathroom, almost a complete recluse. She never attempted to find her daughter but left her money in her will.

She died on 23 November 1995. She is buried in Glasnevin Cemetery in Dublin.

== In other media ==
Zandra, Queen of Jazz, a play based on the life of "Zandra" Mitchell, written and starring Roseanne Lynch, was produced by Darn Skippy Productions and premiered in November 2019 in Dublin, Ireland. It was directed by Katherine Soloviev with original music and sound design by Richard Lennon.

== See also ==
- List of Irish musicians
