= Lady Gasoline =

Studio album by Chris Singleton and The Distractions
- Released: 28 June 2010
- Studio: Abbey Road
- Label: IRL
- Producer: Chris Singleton

Chris Singleton and The Distractions chronology
Twisted City (2006)	Lady Gasoline (2010)

Singles from Lady Gasoline
- 1. "Lady Gasoline" Released: 28 May 2011; 2. "Lose It / Lou Reed" Released: 1 October 2011; 3. "You Came with a Bang" Released: 4 April 2011

Lady Gasoline is the second studio album from Dublin-born musician Chris Singleton and his backing band The Distractions, released in 2010

== Background and recording ==
Lady Gasoline draws on a wider range of influences than Singleton's first album, Twisted City (the Lady Gasoline press release cited a diverse range of influences including Lou Reed, eighties electropop, glam rock and The Stone Roses). According to Singleton - who released a mini-documentary about the album in January 2011 - the themes on the record are chiefly love, lust and sex. "Lady Gasoline" is a character who embodies those themes, "a 'super-muse' who walks all over the tracks." The record was produced by Chris Singleton and like Twisted City was mastered at Abbey Road, by Steve Rooke, the engineer responsible for the 2009 Beatles remasters. Lady Gasoline was released in Ireland on 28 June 2010 through IRL, an independent label whose other artists include Damien Dempsey, The Wonder Stuff and Sharon Shannon; following a generally good critical reaction in Ireland a decision was made to release the album in the UK in May 2011.

== Reception ==
Reviews were mixed to positive. Music Week described it as "packed full of musical depth and surefire radio hits", Q Magazine praised its eclecticism and Ireland's Sunday Business Post gave it a four star review, praising it for having "yearning lyrics, poetic metaphors and an agreeable dose of spite". A dissenting voice came from The Irish Times' Lauren Murphy, who felt the album amounted to "pedestrian pop", saying " it’s nigh on impossible to get a sense of Singleton’s own personality through the haze of imitative ordinariness".

== The Distractions ==
Unlike Singleton's previous album, Twisted City, a large number of musicians feature on the album, including pianist Andy Fleet, backing singer John Gibbons, guitarist Stelios Kalisperides, bassist Zane Maertens and drummer Ben Woollacott. They are credited as 'The Distractions'.

== Track listing ==
No.	Title	Length
1.	"Let Me Out"	3:04
2.	"Lose It"	3:03
3.	"Bad Ambitions"	3:38
4.	"Lou Reed"	2:17
5.	"Caught in the Sun"	2:52
6.	"Lady Gasoline"	3:38
7.	"Sold the World"	3:35
8.	"You Came with a Ban"	2:45
9.	"Blood"	3:17
10.	"Valium"	2:38
11.	"Saturday"	3:16
12.	"Momma Miss Americana"	5:07
Total length:		39:15
