= Faith of Our Fathers (album) =

1996 compilation album

Compilation album by: Frank Patterson; Monks of Glenstal Abbey; RTÉ Philharmonic Choir
- Released: 21 October 1996
- Recorded: 1996
- Genre: Christian
- Languages: English, Latin, Irish
- Label: Lunar (Ireland)
- Producers: John Kearns, Bill Somerville-Large

Singles from Faith of Our Fathers
- 1. "Faith of Our Fathers" Released: 1996

Faith of Our Fathers (subtitled Classic Religious Anthems of Ireland) is a compilation album of traditional Catholic/Christian English, Irish, and Latin hymns recorded by Irish artists in 1996.

The album topped the Irish Albums Chart for two months, broke release records, and was certified fifteen times-platinum. The nineteenth-century hymn "Faith of Our Fathers" is the title track.

== Origins ==
The album was the idea of a broker, John Kearns, working for Hibernian Insurance. Funding included contributions from his coworkers. Several labels turned Kearns down before Lunar records agreed to produce the album.

== Artists ==
The album was produced by Bill Somerville-Large and overseen by musical director John Tate. Tenor Frank Patterson, soprano Regina Nathan, the Monks of Glenstal Abbey, youth choir RTÉ Cór na nÓg, and the RTÉ Philharmonic Choir made contributions to the album. It was recorded over five sessions in venues that included the Aula Maxima at Maynooth College in County Kildare and Glenstal Abbey in County Limerick.

== Track listing ==
- Holy God, We Praise Thy Name
- Sweet Heart of Jesus
- Hail Redeemer, King Divine
- Salve Regina
- Faith of Our Fathers
- The Bells of Angelus
- To Jesus, Heart All Burning
- Tantum Ergo
- Soul of My Savior
- Céad Míle Fáilte Romhat, A Íosa
- Queen of the May
- O Sacrament Most Holy
- Lord of All Hopefulness
- Ave Verum
- Hail Glorious Saint Patrick
- I'll Sing a Hymn to Mary
- Hail Queen of Heaven, the Ocean Star
- Jesus My Lord, My God, My All
- We Stand for God

== Legacy ==
With sales of over 150,000 copies, the album was the biggest-selling release in Ireland in 1996, and it became Ireland's biggest-selling album of all time by 1998. Sales in Ireland stand at 200,000 copies as of November 1997. It launched the recording career of Monks of Glenstal Abbey. Peter Lennon compared its popularity to that of Riverdance. The success of the record led the album's promoters to arrange concert performances in the Dublin's Point Depot and New York City's Carnegie Hall.

A Faith of Our Fathers II album was released in 1997, which inspired the name of Dustin the Turkey's Christmas album Faith of Our Feathers.
