= Trinití =

Irish musical group

Trinití, an Irish girl band, and Celtic music vocal trio, is composed of artists Laura Cunningham, Sharon Moran, and Eve O'Donnell.

== History ==
The group was formed in Dublin, Ireland in 2005, and was signed to Universal Music Group, Universal Classics, and Jazz, UK in 2006. They received the then-largest record deal for an emerging band in Irish history.

Their debut album ‘Triniti’, was released on 22 May 2006. It featured collaborations with internationally renowned artists such as Iarla Ó Lionáird, Irish vocalist, and co-writers Secret Garden, an Irish-Norwegian duo Fionnuala Sherry and composer, arranger and pianist Rolf Løvland. The album reached No.1 in the Irish classical chart. It was referred to by The Guardian as "concoction of layered silvery vocals".

Produced by Ross Cullum, the sound of their debut album was inspired by his work on earlier productions for Clannad and Moya Brennan. Cullum also co-produced Enya’s classic debut album ‘Watermark’, he has also produced albums by Bon Jovi, Tori Amos and Paul McCartney.

Trinití toured and supported G4 and Aled Jones on two extensive UK and Irish tours where they performed at prestigious venues such as The Royal Albert Hall, London, the SEC Armadillo, Glasgow, The Glasgow Royal Concert Hall, Scotland; and St. David’s Hall, Cardiff. Other performance highlights include support for opera singer, Katherine Jenkins, and at Terry Wogan's BBC Proms in the park 2006, and the opening of the Special Olympics, Belfast in 2006.

The band was co-managed by Lewis Kovac who previously worked with Blondie, The Bee Gees and The Cranberries. The group won Best Traditional Act at Belfast's Big Buzz Awards, as well as The Irish Post Award for Best Newcomer of 2007. The group was nominated for a Meteor Music Award in 2009. Trinití disbanded in 2008 after the choice not to renew the contract for a second album deal.

Today, vocalist Laura Cunningham is an Irish social media influencer who has presented fashion on breakfast show Ireland AM on Ireland's TV3 and an Editor for international publications. Sharon Moran is living and working in Italy, where she is a clothing designer and the business owner of Sharon Juliana Brand, a line of eco vintage clothing. Eve O'Donnell is living and working in Brooklyn, as a composer, vocalist and as the Artistic Producer of the Composer Initiatives at National Sawdust.

== Discography ==
=== Albums ===
First Released	Title	UK Chart	Label	Notes
19 June 2006	Trinití	28	UCJ	

=== Singles ===
First Released	Title	UK Chart	Label	Notes
22 May 2006	Rose on Water		UCJ	Debut single, Product Code 985 507-9

== Awards ==
- The group won Best Traditional Act at Belfast's Big Buzz Awards 2007
- The group won The Irish Post Award for Best Newcomer of 2007
- The group was nominated for a Meteor Music Award, Best Pop Act in 2009
