= Twisted City =

Studio album by Chris Singleton
- Released: 2006
- Genre: Rock
- Label: Right Track/Universal
- Producer: Chris Singleton

Chris Singleton chronology
Twisted City (2006)	Lady Gasoline (2010)

Image used on back cover and promotional poster

Professional ratings
Review scores
Source	Rating
musicOMH	3/5 stars

Twisted City is a 2006 album by Dublin singer-songwriter Chris Singleton. A self-engineered and produced album, it took two and a half years to complete. The album was conceived as a tube journey through London; every song was a 'stop on the line' and dealt with Chris' experiences of the city, both personal and professional. The album was mastered in May 2006 by well-known engineer Geoff Pesche (Coldplay, Gorillaz, Kylie Minogue) at Abbey Road Studios, London and was released in the UK and Ireland in September 2006 by Right Track/Universal Music Operations. Given the association between the album and the tube, the launch event for the album took place on the London Underground in August 2006 and attracted coverage from ITV News and BBC Radio. "Twisted City" received a warm welcome from rock critics, receiving positive reviews from The Irish Times, Hotpress, Clash Magazine and The Daily Express amongst others.

Although Chris Singleton is an Irish artist, Twisted City takes as its main influences classic English rock. Particular influences include The Beatles (see 'Pieces' and 'Wherever'), T.Rex (in particular, 'Gimme Something'), David Bowie ('Worry Number One') and The Stone Roses ('The Only One'). As a result of these influences, the album arguably has more of a 'rock band' sound to it than those of other contemporary Irish singer-songwriters.

== 'Twisted City' as free download ==
Following the release of Radiohead's 'In Rainbows,' Chris Singleton decided in late 2007 to experiment with a similar model of distribution for the album by making it temporarily available as a free download. Upon signing up to receive news updates, and recommending the album to their friends, visitors to could download the album at no cost. The record was made available on a microsite which featured a flash-programmed 'virtual tape' which people clicked on receive their album.

== 'Twisted City Tour' ==
In January 2008 Chris added an additional component to the free download of the album, by providing a downloadable guidebook to accompany it. The guidebook, containing a list of the locations which inspired the album, enabled listeners to go on a 'Twisted City Tour', where they visited each of the album's "stops" and played the relevant track on an MP3 player.

== Singles ==
There were four singles released from 'Twisted City' in 2006 and 2007. These were:

- Worry Number One, BRCDS01CS, single, released on 18 September 2006 through Brownpaper Records, Right Track and Universal Music Operations.
- Get Up, single, BRCDS02CS, released on 22 January September 2007 through Brownpaper Records, Right Track and Universal Music Operations.
- Tonight, BRCDS03CS, single, released on 18 April 2007 through Brownpaper Records, Right Track and Universal Music Operations.
- Pieces/Gimme Something, BRCDS04CS, double A-side single, released on 17 September 2007 through Brownpaper Records, Right Track and Universal Music Operations.

== Track listing ==
1. "Worry Number One"
2. "Gimme Something"
3. "Get Up"
4. "Tonight"
5. "Stop Following"
6. "Pieces"
7. "The Only One"
8. "Wherever"
9. "You Carry On"
10. "Twisted City"
11. "People"
