= Volunteer Ireland =

- Merged into: Volunteer Centres Ireland, Volunteering Ireland
- Formation: 2011
- Legal status: Charity
- Purpose: Support of local Volunteer Centres and Volunteering Information Services
- Headquarters: Carmichael House, 4 Brunswick Street North, Dublin 7, D07 RHA8
- Location: Ireland
- Region served: Ireland
- CEO: Nina Arwitz
- Website: https://www.volunteer.ie/

Volunteer Ireland is an Irish national volunteer development organisation, which supports a network of local Volunteer Centres and Volunteering Information Services in Ireland.

== History ==
Volunteer Ireland began as two organisations, Volunteer Centres Ireland and Volunteering Ireland, which were merged in 2011. In 2000 some of the older volunteer centres, including what is now the South Dublin County Volunteer Centre, the Volunteer Centre Fingal and Volunteering Ireland, came together to discuss common issues and goals. In 2001, it was decided to formalise this grouping and Volunteer Centres Ireland (VCI) was formed. VCI adopted a constitution, membership criteria and agreed aims and objectives.

The VCI lobbied government to support a national infrastructure of volunteer centres, as part of the recommendations in Tipping the Balance (2002). In January 2005, the Joint Oireachtas Committee on Volunteering published its report, Volunteers and Volunteering in Ireland, in which it specifically recommended that the existing volunteering infrastructure be developed through VCI and Volunteering Ireland. A few months later, the Department of Community, Rural and Gaeltacht Affairs announced a package of funding measures to fund this organisational infrastructure. The department extended funding to all the volunteer centres and VCI received funding to employ a national development officer.

On 28 January 2009, VCI addressed the Oireachtas Subcommittee on Community, Rural and Gaeltacht affairs on volunteering trends in Ireland.

Volunteer Ireland receives funding from the Department of Rural and Community Development and the Gaeltacht, and is a member of European Volunteer Centre, the International Association for Volunteer Effort and Points of Light.

== Activities ==
Volunteer Ireland release research and data on volunteering and volunteers in Ireland. In 2012, they claimed that volunteers in Ireland saved the Irish government millions of euro, and that volunteers had contributed free labour over the preceding 2 years that was worth €22.7 million. They run the I-VOL phone app, which allows people to find volunteering opportunities in their area.

In 2018 and 2019 they reported that the average age of volunteers was getting younger year-on-year. In 2019, Volunteer Ireland partnered with Dublin Airport to pilot a scheme, Fáilte Abhaile/Welcome Volunteers, during which volunteers welcomed and assisted those arriving into the airport over the Christmas period. During the COVID-19 pandemic in 2020, Volunteer Ireland was involved in large scale recruiting of volunteers to help with supporting the HSE and other government departments. Activities were coordinated through the network of Volunteer Centres.

=== National Volunteering Week ===
The organisation run an annual awareness week, the National Volunteering Week, each May since 2012. In 2017, they estimate that roughly 500,000 people in Ireland volunteer in some capacity annually.

=== Volunteer Ireland Awards ===
Volunteer Ireland have held an annual awards ceremony, Volunteer Ireland Awards, which celebrates volunteers in Ireland in a number of fields since 2007.

There are 11 categories:

- Animals and Environment
- Campaigning and Awareness Raising
- Children and Youth
- Community
- Culture, Arts and Media
- Education and Training
- Health and Disability
- International Development
- Social Work and Social Inclusion
- Sports and Recreation
- Outstanding Group

The main award is the Christine Buckley Volunteer of the Year.
