= St Vincent's Industrial School, Goldenbridge =

Former industrial school in Dublin, Ireland

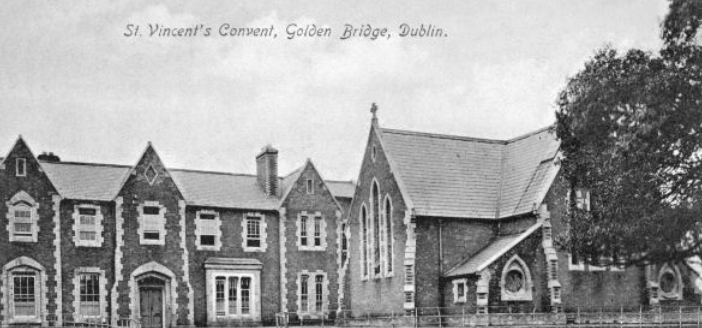
St. Vincent's Industrial School, Goldenbridge -early 1900s

St. Vincent's Industrial School, Goldenbridge, popularly known as Goldenbridge, was an industrial school in Dublin, Ireland. It was run by the Sisters of Mercy.

== History ==
The Sisters of Mercy order was founded by Catherine McAuley in Dublin in 1831. In 1855, Cardinal Paul Cullen invited the Sisters of Mercy to provide a rehabilitation service to women who had been incarcerated in Mountjoy Prison, by educating them and preparing them for final release. The convict refuge was opened in 1856. The Sisters continued with this work until 1883.

In 1880 a building within Goldenbridge convent was certified as an industrial school and named St Vincent’s Industrial School. It opened with an initial intake of 30 girls. In 1883 the convict refuge was converted into an industrial school. The industrial school closed in 1983.

Throughout the early 20th century, the Industrial School would receive children from the Dublin Police Court system, who had been convicted of crimes under the Industrial Schools Act 1868 and the Children Act 1908 (8 Edw. 7. c. 67). These crimes fell into the categories of homelessness, wandering, destitution, begging, lack of proper guardianship, and non-attendance at school. Children as young as three years old would be sentenced to incarceration in an institution until their 16th birthday.

About thirty sisters were housed in the convent at Goldenbridge, which housed a large national school and a laundry which closed in the 1950s. Few of the sisters worked in the industrial school.

== Inspections ==
In March 1941, Dr. McCabe carried out a general inspection and found that the School was ‘well kept’ and satisfactory in all areas. There is no General Inspection Report for 1942. The next inspection took place on 27 January 1944 and she commented that the premises were ‘very well kept, clean and tidy’ and most areas were found to be ‘satisfactory’, but she found that the ‘children looked far from being neat and tidy’. She said that their clothes were ‘tattered and untidy’ and their blankets were ‘thin and worn’.

The General Inspection Reports of the 1940s criticised the food and diet of the children; in particular, insufficient quantities of milk and butter were given during the war years. The Department of Education had allotted certain rations of milk and butter for children in industrial schools, and these quantities were not adhered to in Goldenbridge.

Dr McCabe's General Inspection Reports from 1948 until her retirement in 1963 were, without exception, very positive. The General Inspection Reports after Dr McCabe's retirement continued to be very favourable about the living conditions in the School. Dr Charles Lysaght, who carried out a General Inspection of the School on 21 March 1966, commented that it was ‘well run’: the premises were clean and in ‘good repair’ and the accommodation consisted mostly of modern buildings with ‘excellent dormitory accommodation’.

In the 1970s, Graham Granville took over as the Department's General Inspector. His reports were also very favourable of the living conditions and the premises and accommodation. However, Mr Granville was concerned about the lack of qualifications of the staff and the change in the type of child that was being admitted. A lot of the children were categorised as "disturbed". Proposals for the group home system were advocated, and sanction was given, but these plans were not carried through until the 1980s.

== Media coverage ==
Christine Buckley was interviewed on The Gay Byrne Show on 8 November 1992 as she was looking for her parents. Media interest in Goldenbridge and other institutional abuse were sporadic until the broadcast in 1996 of the documentary Dear Daughter which made very serious allegations about physical and emotional abuse.

== Response from the Sisters of Mercy and the State ==
Christine Buckley was interviewed on The Gay Byrne Show on 8 November 1992 as she was looking for her parents. Media interest in Goldenbridge and other institutional abuse were sporadic until the broadcast in 1996 of the documentary Dear Daughter which made very serious allegations about physical and emotional abuse.

In 1999 then Taoiseach Bertie Ahern issued an apology.

In 2004 Sr. Breege O' Neill give a clarified apology on behalf of herself and the Sisters of Mercy nuns, as survivors had felt it was incomplete and conditional. She gave an unreserved and unconditional apology to the former residents of the orphanage. She asked for forgiveness for the congregation and for the failures to hear concerns, for the physical and emotional suffering, and took responsibility for the sisters who had failed.

In 2006, at the investigation committee for the Commission to Inquire into Child Abuse, Sister Helen O'Donoghue, provincial superior, denied "any deliberate, severe injury to anybody" at St. Vincent's She felt that Goldenbridge had been "vilified" in the media and she hoped an examination would be made by a competent authority. Asked about the previous apology she said "like anywhere else, children suffered pain and hurt was not averted."

== Commission to Inquire into Child Abuse ==
The Commission reviewed conditions at the facility during the period 1936 to 1983. St. Vincent's was under the management of the Sisters of Mercy Convent in Carysfort, the mother house of all the Dublin Mercy Communities. The Superior of the Goldenbridge convent had very little involvement with the day-to-day running of the School. Her role consisted of interacting with the Department of Education. The actual management of the Industrial School was left to two nuns – the Sister-in-Charge and, from 1942 onwards, her assistant.

The children cared for in Goldenbridge had, prior to their reception into care, experienced gross neglect, deprivation and multiple trauma. They were often rejected by their immediate and extended family and by the broader society. They were admitted in large numbers to a service which could not even begin to provide an appropriate level of care. ...No professional training was available to provide understanding or direction to service organisation or therapeutic interventions.

The physical environment was totally unstable and did not facilitate either supervision or privacy. The financial resources were grossly inadequate and determined the availability of personnel and material necessities.

Some of the care practices may be understood by reference to the harsh historical context. Some actions experienced as abusive may not have had such intent, but were experienced as such due to insensitivity and ignorance. The regime became kinder and more child-centred in the late 1960s and the number of complainants was small, which suggests that even though Goldenbridge was still a large, crowded institution, better management could have an important bearing on the quality of life of the children.

=== Staffing ===
In the early 40s the day-to-day operation of the School and the care of the children were left to two untrained lay teachers. After classes, these women supervised the children and put them to bed. They were assisted by four care workers, one in the kitchen, one in the laundry and two generally in the house. These care workers were girls who had grown up in Goldenbridge and were unable to get work outside the Institution. In the evening, the sister returned to the convent, and the two lay teachers looked after the children until the next day. Among the Commissions findings was that during the 1940s Goldenbridge was both over-crowded and understaffed, however defects in the management of the School were not observed by official inspectors.

=== Physical abuse ===
Abuse by the largely unsupervised lay staff became a major feature of life in Goldenbridge in the 1950s and 1960s. The use of former residents as staff was influenced by limited finance and tended to be limited to those who could not survive in aftercare. These were probably the most unsuitable people to care for vulnerable children. Allegations of corporal punishment made against both Sisters and lay teachers appear to be correct in many instances. Corporal punishment was pervasive, unpredictable, arbitrary and was used for small infringements, although after the 1960s it decreased significantly. It was used as a punishment for bedwetting as late as the 1970s. Beatings on the landing were particularly cruel.

Children were protected if they had family members who visited them or if staff liked them. No punishment book seems to have been kept, contrary to regulations and this was not noted by the Departmental Inspector.

=== Sexual abuse ===
The commission concluded that in general there was not an issue with sexual abuse, though one incident in 1962 was dealt with promptly. However, the management did not consider the possibility of abuse when sending children to foster families.

=== Emotional abuse ===
Goldenbridge could have had a regime that was kinder and made children feel safe and secure. Low self-esteem was still a problem for those in Goldenbridge who testified to the Commission. Children were regularly humiliated and belittled by the nuns and carers who were supposed to look after them. Those with family who were in regular contact were shown favouritism. Girls who left Goldenbridge had a poor preparation for the outside world.

=== Neglect ===
Children suffered from severe neglect, though very hard work by two nuns produced improvements. Departmental inspections were weak as they did not record the neglect.

From 1952 onwards, Dr McCabe reported that the clothes were ‘very good’. In her General Inspection Report of May 1955, she stated, "children very well groomed".

=== Education ===
The Department of Education school inspection report for March 1935 had noted a very satisfactory educational standard in Goldenbridge, with each school subject rated either ‘very good’ or ‘good on the whole’. Within seven years, standards in the school had plummeted. In 1942, there were only two untrained lay teachers responsible for educating 150 children of different ages and abilities. These two teachers were ill-equipped to deal with this workload. From the late 1950s, children who showed academic ability were given the opportunity of pursuing post primary education because of a scholarship fund set up by the Archbishop of Dublin. In the 1960s, and a number of children were sent out to do secretarial courses towards the end of their time there.

The internal primary school for the industrial school had a lower standard of education than that for the external school. Given their disadvantaged backgrounds, many of the children were in need of what would now be termed remedial education. No support or encouragement was given to children with serious educational problems such as little or no education. Children were taken out of school for domestic duties, with some being taken out more than others. In addition to the normal national school curriculum, children aged 13 and over participated in a domestic economy training module overseen by the Department of Education. Many children were only trained for domestic service.

Aftercare did not feature prominently in the testimony of witnesses before the Committee. The Sisters appeared to be able to find positions for most of the girls when they left at 16 years of age.

=== Chores ===
Older girls education suffered as they were taken out of class to look after younger girls. Chores became abusive because they were too taxing and carried out under threat of punishment. Older girls had no recreational or personal time because of chores and bead-making.

=== Rosary Bead making ===
At some time in the early 1950s or the late 1940s, Sr Alida was approached by a businessman who suggested that the Institution could become involved in making rosary beads. Thus, the bead-making industry in Goldenbridge was introduced into the daily routine of the pupils, and continued until the mid-1960s. Children in Goldenbridge produced rosary beads from the 1940s to the 1960s. They had a quota of sixty decades a day on weekdays and ninety on Saturdays. The commission remarked that the conditions children worked under caused stress and anxiety and would not have been tolerated in factories. The commission also noted that the bead-making deprived children of recreation that was essential for social, emotional and psychological growth. Proceeds from the bead-making were put to the purchase of a holiday home in Rathdrum so that the children have a summer holiday away from the institution. "[T]hose who could not go home for a holiday spent the entire summer holidays there."

=== Food ===
Throughout the 1950s, the food and diet of the children was described as ‘very good’ by Dr McCabe. She spoke favourably of the food and diet when she inspected the School on two occasions in 1955. In particular, she stated that the meals ‘were attractive, well cooked and attractively served’. Dr Lysaght inspected Goldenbridge on behalf of the Department in March 1966. He wrote a detailed report in which he noted that the children looked well nourished and healthy. He inspected the main meal of the day, which consisted of soup, milk, mincemeat, vegetables, custard and tinned pears, and he found that the amounts served were ample and well cooked.

Food was of poor quality and there was little of it. Occasional attempts to remedy this did little to help. Scraps of food were thrown from a container and children scrambled for them.

== Source ==
- "Chapter 7: St Vincent's Industrial School, Goldenbridge ('Goldenbridge'), 1880–1983". Commission to Inquire into Child Abuse.
