= Louis Lentin =

Irish theatre, film and television director (1933-2014)

- Born: 11 December 1933; Limerick, Ireland
- Died: 22 July 2014 (aged 80)
- Education: Trinity College Dublin
- Occupations: Film and theatre director, television director, screenwriter, film and television producer
- Spouse: Ronit Lentin
- Children: Alana and Miki https://ifiplayer.ie/louis-lentin/

Louis Lentin (11 December 1933 – 22 July 2014) was a theatre, film and television director. He was born in Limerick, Ireland, in 1933 and worked for over forty years in the arts in Ireland. He graduated from Trinity College, Dublin, in 1956 with a Bachelor of Arts.

He founded Art Theatre Productions in 1959 and was responsible for the first Irish productions of Krapp's Last Tape and Endgame. RTÉ head of drama Hilton Edwards asked him to work in RTÉ. In 1975, he received a Jacob's Award for his direction of three television plays broadcast on RTÉ in the previous year: Aleksei Arbuzov's The Promise, Bertolt Brecht's Mother Courage, and Jean Anouilh's The Rehearsal ("La Répétition ou l'Amour puni"). Lentin was a member of Aosdána.

Louis Lentin was also involved in founding Israeli television.

He died, aged 80, on 22 July 2014.

== Productions ==
=== A Penny for your Thoughts ===
One of a series of four 40-minute cross-European programmes The New European on the introduction of the Euro. Script and direction, Lisa Mulcahy, Producer, Louis Lentin. In association with MM Productions Amsterdam funded by NCRV, RTÉ and ZDF Dokukanal.

=== Cathleen O'Neill – Born Bolshy ===
Documentary profile of the North Dublin inner city activist and educator. Funded by RTÉ. Certificate for Creative Excellence US International Film and Video Festival.

=== "Ár Dover Féin" ===
A one-hour drama-documentary re-telling/ examination of the 1937 Kirkintilloch Bothy disaster in which ten young "tattie hokers" all from Achill Island, lost their lives. Viewed against the background of seasonal migration from Achill and Donegal; and in the context of racist attitudes then and now. Funded by TG4, The Gaelic Broadcasting Committee and Bord Scannán na hÉireann (the Irish Film Board). Second Prize Gold Plaque WorldFest Heuston. Certificate of Creative Excellence US International Film and Video Festival. John Healy Award and overall Media Award Carrick-Gold Festival. Celtic Film and Television Festival Nomination.

=== The Work of Angels?....the Book of Kells ===
A major one-hour film exploring one of the most famous illuminated manuscripts in the World. In association with Muse Television and Film, New York and Viz Ltd. Funded by RTÉ, Bord Scannán na hÉireann (The Irish Film Board), The Gaelic Broadcasting Committee, Scotland. Edinburgh Film Festival 2000, Cork Film Festival 2000, Montreal Arts Festival 2001, New York Festivals Finalist Award 2001, Banff Rockies 2000 Arts Documentary Nomination.

=== Stolen Lives ===
Three 1-hour documentaries. "Our Boys' Stories", "We Were Only Children", "Philomena's Story". Personal narratives detailing and examining the lifelong effect of physical, mental and sexual abuse in Irish Industrial Schools between the 1940s and 1970s. Funded by TV3.

=== Tales from the Poorhouse / Scéalta Ó Theach na mBocht ===
by Eugene McCabe, translated by John McArdle. The Orphan Girl; The Master; The Landlord; The Mother. Disturbing excavations of the almost unthinkable human realities of the Great Famine-set and filmed within the scenario of a Famine Poorhouse. Four interlinked personal testimonies. Funded by TG4 and RTÉ. Banff Television Nomination 1999. Silver Screen Award 1999. US International Film and Television Festival.

=== No More Blooms ===
A one-hour documentary, examining Ireland's attitude to the Jewish Refugee Problem, 1933–46. Funded by RTÉ. Creative Excellence award 1998 US International Film and Television Festival.

=== Dear Daughter ===
A one-hour documentary-drama. In recounting the story of Christine Buckley, an Afro-Irish woman's search for her parents the film exposed the regime of cruelty that existed in the fifties and sixties in Goldenbridge Orphanage, run by the Sisters of Mercy in Dublin. Funded by RTÉ and Bord Scannán na hÉireann (The Irish Film Board). 1997 Banff Television Festival Nomination for Social and Political Documentary, 1996 Creative Excellence Certificate, US International Film and Television Festival. Input and the best of Input.

=== Bóthar an Bháis ===
Eight 13-minute location-based series on The Great Famine. Presented by Michael Gibbons. Funded by Teilifis na Gaeilge.

=== McKennas' Ireland ===
Six 30-minute 'Hidden Ireland' food and hospitality series presented by award-winning food writers, John and Sally McKenna. Funded by RTÉ.

=== The Quality of Rapture ===
A one-hour documentary profile of Irish soprano Regina Nathan. Funded by RTÉ.

=== The Grey House ===
A 20-minute arts documentary examination of a location installation by Glen Dimplex nominee artist, Patricia McKenna.

=== Personal Concerns ===
Four 1-hour profiles of major Irish dramatists, Tom Murphy, Paul Mercier, Frank McGuinness and Graham Reid. Funded by RTÉ.

=== Grandpa, speak to me in Russian ===
In this docudrama Lentin reconstructs the life of his paternal grandfather, Kalman Solomon Lentin who came to live with his family in Ireland in 1936. Lentin sets out, with his son Miki Lentin, to find out where the old folk came from, what was it like and if anything survived. Leaving Ireland and journeying through the Baltic countries he uncovers the story of his family and the lost world of the Jewish shtetl.
