= Frank Patterson =

Irish tenor (1938–2000)

Frank Patterson KSG KCHS
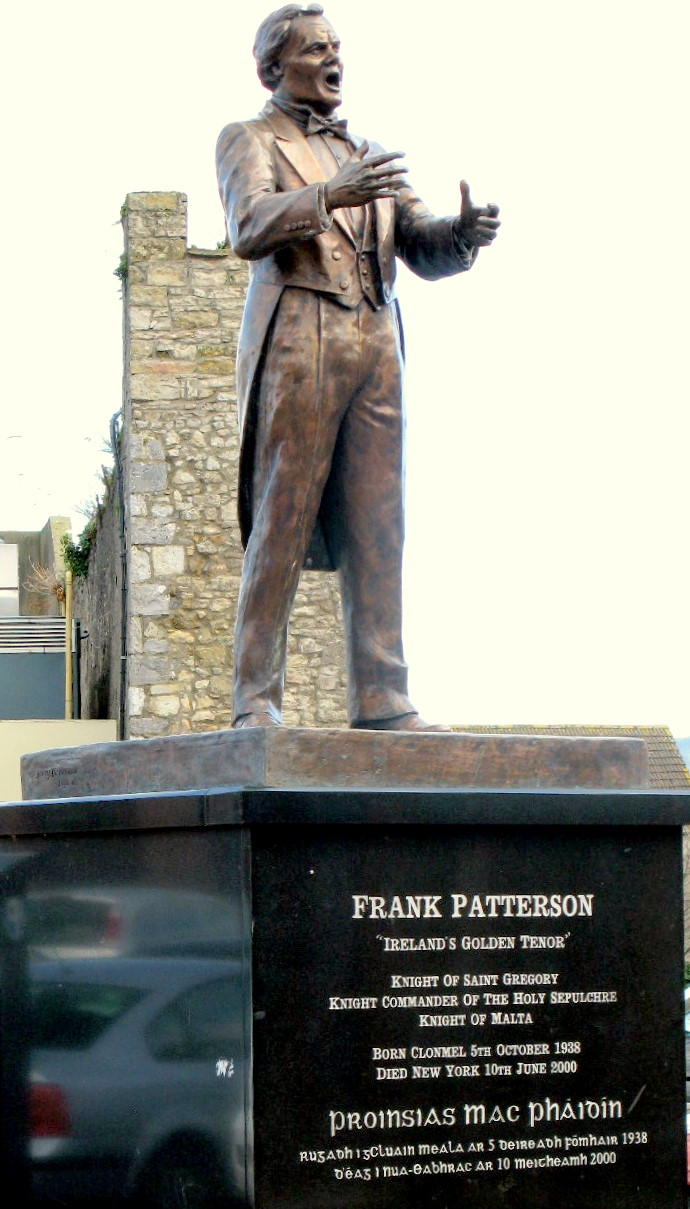
- Bronze life-size piece by Jerry McKenna titled "The Golden Tenor Statue". Unveiled in Mick Delahunty Square Clonmel, June 2002.

Background information
- Born: 5 October 1938; Clonmel, County Tipperary, Ireland
- Died: 10 June 2000 (aged 61) New York City, U.S.
- Genres: Operetta, popular, Irish drawing room, church music
- Occupation: Singer
- Years active: 1964–2000
- Labels: RCA Victor, Valley Entertainment, Rego Irish

Frank Patterson (5 October 1938 – 10 June 2000) was an internationally renowned Irish tenor following in the tradition of singers such as Count John McCormack and Josef Locke. He was known as "Ireland's Golden Tenor".

== Early life ==
Patterson was born in Clonmel, County Tipperary. As a boy he performed with his local parish choir and was involved in maintaining the annual tradition of singing with the "Wrenboys". He received special encouragement from local connoisseur Tommy O'Brien after a highschool performance as Lazarello in W. V. Wallace's Maritana. He sang in the local St. Mary's Choral Society and at a production of The Pirates of Penzance performed with both his parents. His interests extended beyond music and as a boy he represented Marlfield GAA hurling club, played tennis at Hillview and golf at the Mountain Road course. He quit school at an early stage to work at 'Slater's', the printing business of his mother's family. Patterson moved to Dublin in 1961 to enrol at the National Academy of Theatre and Allied Arts where he studied acting while at the same time receiving vocal training from Hans Waldemar Rosen. In 1964, he entered the Feis Ceoil, a nationwide music competition, in which he won several sections including oratorio, lieder and the German Gold Cup.

== Career ==
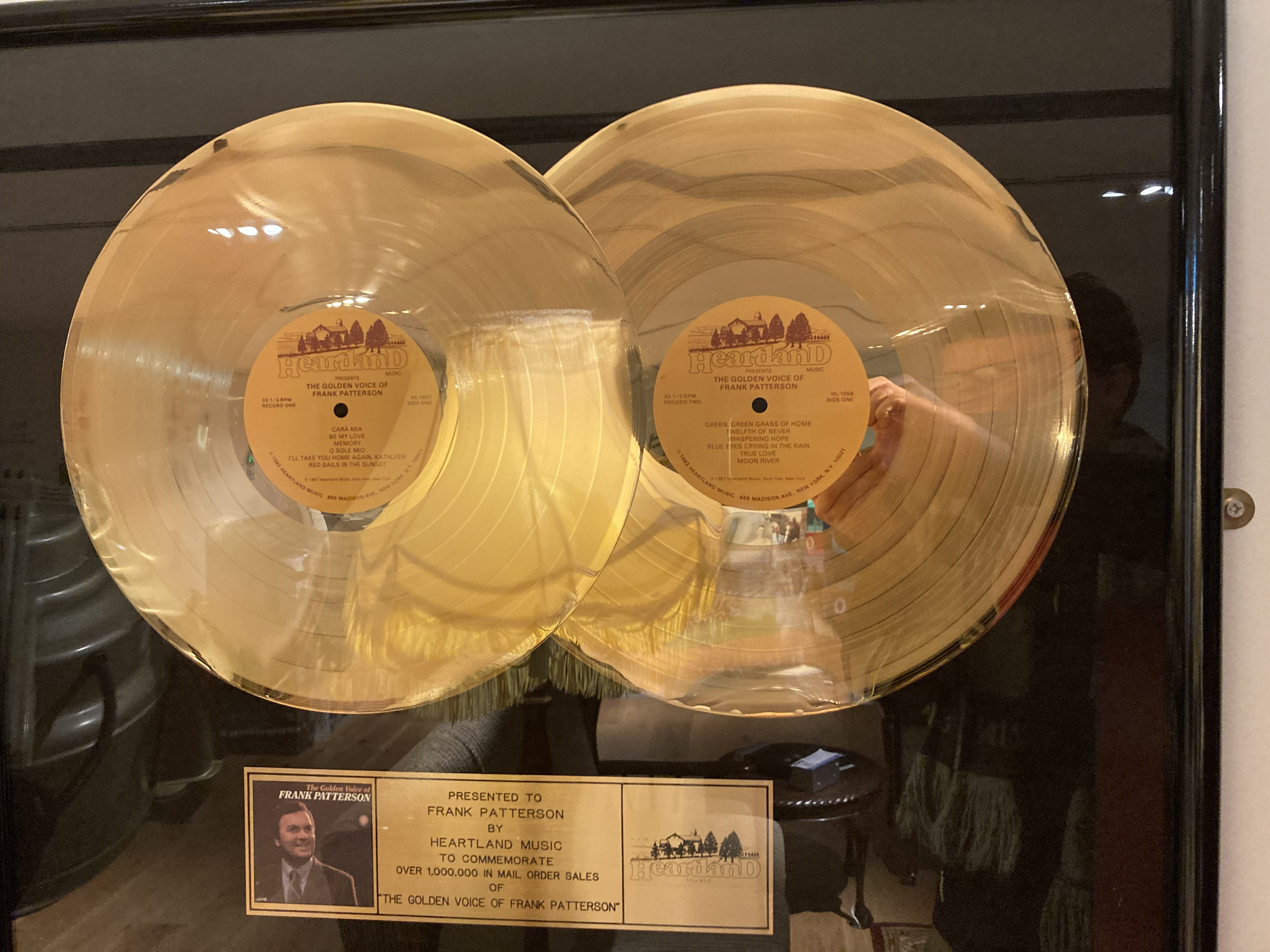
Gold record awarded to Patterson by Heartland for 1 million sales of The Golden Voice of Frank Patterson. (Tipperary Museum of Hidden History)

Patterson gave classical recitals around Ireland and won scholarships to study in London, Paris and in the Netherlands. While in Paris, he appeared in a radio broadcast, which caught the attention of the Philips Record Company. This led to a contract and his first record, My Dear Native Land. He worked with conductors such as Sir Colin Davis and some of the most prestigious orchestras in Europe including the London Symphony Orchestra and Orchestre de Paris. He also toured with Janine Micheau in Pelléas et Mélisande and won a reputation as a singer of Handel, Mozart, and Bach oratorios and German, Italian and French song. Patterson had a long-running programme on RTÉ, the Irish national broadcaster, titled For Your Pleasure.

In the early 1980s he moved to the United States, making his home in rural Westchester County, New York. A resurgence of interest in Irish culture encouraged him to turn towards a more traditional Irish repertoire. Adding hymns, ballads, and traditional as well as more popular tunes to his catalogue he became a popular singer in a country with a strong Irish connection and in March 1988 was featured host in a St. Patrick's Day celebration of music and dance at New York's famous Radio City Music Hall.

He gave an outdoor performance on the steps of the Capitol in Washington with the National Symphony Orchestra before an audience of 60,000. Patterson was equally at home in more intimate settings, such as a concert he gave for Boys Town. His singing in the role of the Evangelist in Bach's St. John Passion was given fine reviews. Further recordings followed, of Beethoven arrangements, Irish songs, Berlioz songs, Purcell songs and others, all on the Philips label.

Frank Patterson performed sell-out concerts from London's Royal Albert Hall to New York's Carnegie Hall, and with his family he presented two concerts at the White House, for presidents Ronald Reagan in 1982 and Bill Clinton in 1995. He recorded over thirty albums in six languages, won silver, gold and platinum discs and was the first Irish singer to host his own show in Radio City Music Hall in New York.

Rising to greater prominence with the new popularity of "Celtic" music in the 1990s, Patterson saw many of his past recordings reissued for American audiences, and in 1998 he starred in the PBS special Ireland in Song. His last album outsold Pavarotti.

In recognition of his musical achievements he was awarded an honorary doctorate from Salve Regina University, Newport in 1990, an honorary doctorate in fine arts from Manhattan College in 1996, and the Gold Medal of the Éire Society of Boston in 1998.

=== Film ===
Patterson appeared in several films, starting with The Dead (1987), an adaptation of a story by James Joyce, which was directed by John Huston and starred his daughter Anjelica Huston. Patterson played Bartell D'Arcy, the character who sings "The Lass of Aughrim".

Patterson is heard twice in the Coen brothers film Millers Crossing (1990), in which he sings both Danny Boy and Goodnight Sweetheart. In 1996, he appeared as "tenor in restaurant" in Neil Jordan's Michael Collins, singing "Macushla". A recording of him singing the Irish traditional "Dan Tucker" also appeared in Martin Scorsese's Gangs of New York (2002).

== Religion and social conscience ==
Patterson was a devout Catholic, and in 1979 sang at the Mass celebrated by Pope John Paul II in Dublin's Phoenix Park before a congregation of almost a million people. In 1984, he was awarded the Knighthood of St. Gregory by the Pope. He was also a Knight of Malta and a Knight Commander of the Holy Sepulchre of Jerusalem. While many of his Irish songs were quite sentimental, he did not indulge in strongly nationalistic themes and the first funds raised for the Glencree Centre for Peace and Reconciliation in the early 1970s were takings from a concert he gave in the Rupert Guinness Hall. Later, he continued to donate to the centre from his performances at the National Concert Hall in Dublin.

=== Faith of our Fathers ===
Patterson was one of various artists (including the Monks of Glenstal Abbey, the RTÉ Philharmonic Choir, and the Dublin Philharmonic Orchestra) to create the Faith of Our Fathers album, which topped the Irish Albums Chart for two months in 1996.

== Illness and death ==
In 1999, he learned he had a brain tumour. He had several operations in the following year and his condition appeared to have stabilised. Cardinal O'Connor, in his personal funeral plan, had requested that Frank Patterson sing Ave Maria at his funeral. Patterson was diagnosed with a recurrence of his illness on 7 May 2000 and he cancelled his appearance at the cardinal's funeral on the following morning, 8 May. Following the cardinals's funeral, Patterson briefly recuperated and resumed performing. Patterson's last performance was on 4 June 2000 at Regis College in Weston, Massachusetts, a suburb of Boston. Shortly thereafter he was admitted to the Memorial Sloan-Kettering Cancer Center where he lapsed into a coma and died at the age of 61.

At his death accolades and tributes came from, among others, President of Ireland Mary McAleese, Taoiseach Bertie Ahern and Opposition leader John Bruton who said he had "the purest voice of his generation". He was survived by his wife, the concert pianist Eily O'Grady, their son Eanan, a violinist with whom he frequently performed, and by his sister Imelda Malone and brothers Noel and Maurice.

== Legacy ==
In December 2005, Lisa Marie Presley attended a celebrity wedding in County Tipperary, and while there made a detour to place flowers on Patterson's grave as a tribute from the Presley family, impressed by Patterson's interpretations of songs later performed by Elvis.

"You'll come and find the place where I am lying,
And kneel and say an Ave there for me;
And I shall hear, though soft you tread above me,
And all my grave will warmer, sweeter be,
For you will bend and tell me that you love me,
And I shall sleep in peace until you come to me."

In February 2002. an independent film-maker, Johnny Watts, met Eily Patterson on Staten Island, New York. This meeting resulted in The Tribute in Song, a series of three one-hour programmes featuring Patterson's music to commemorate those killed in Manhattan in 9/11 which also became a moving tribute to Frank Patterson himself. In September 2008, Watts personally presented to the Irish consulate in New York City, a plaque that honoured Frank Patterson's contribution to Tribute in Song. It was intended that the plaque would be returned to Patterson's native Clonmel.

A bronze life-size piece by sculptor Jerry McKenna from Texas, titled "The Golden Tenor Statue", was unveiled to his memory in Mick Delahunty Square, Clonmel, in June 2002.

== Sources ==
- "It was said the whole world seemed still when he sang" (obituary), in The Irish Times, 17 June 2000.
