= Glenstal Abbey =

Benedictine monastery in Murroe, County Limerick, Ireland

- Mainistir Ghleann Stáil
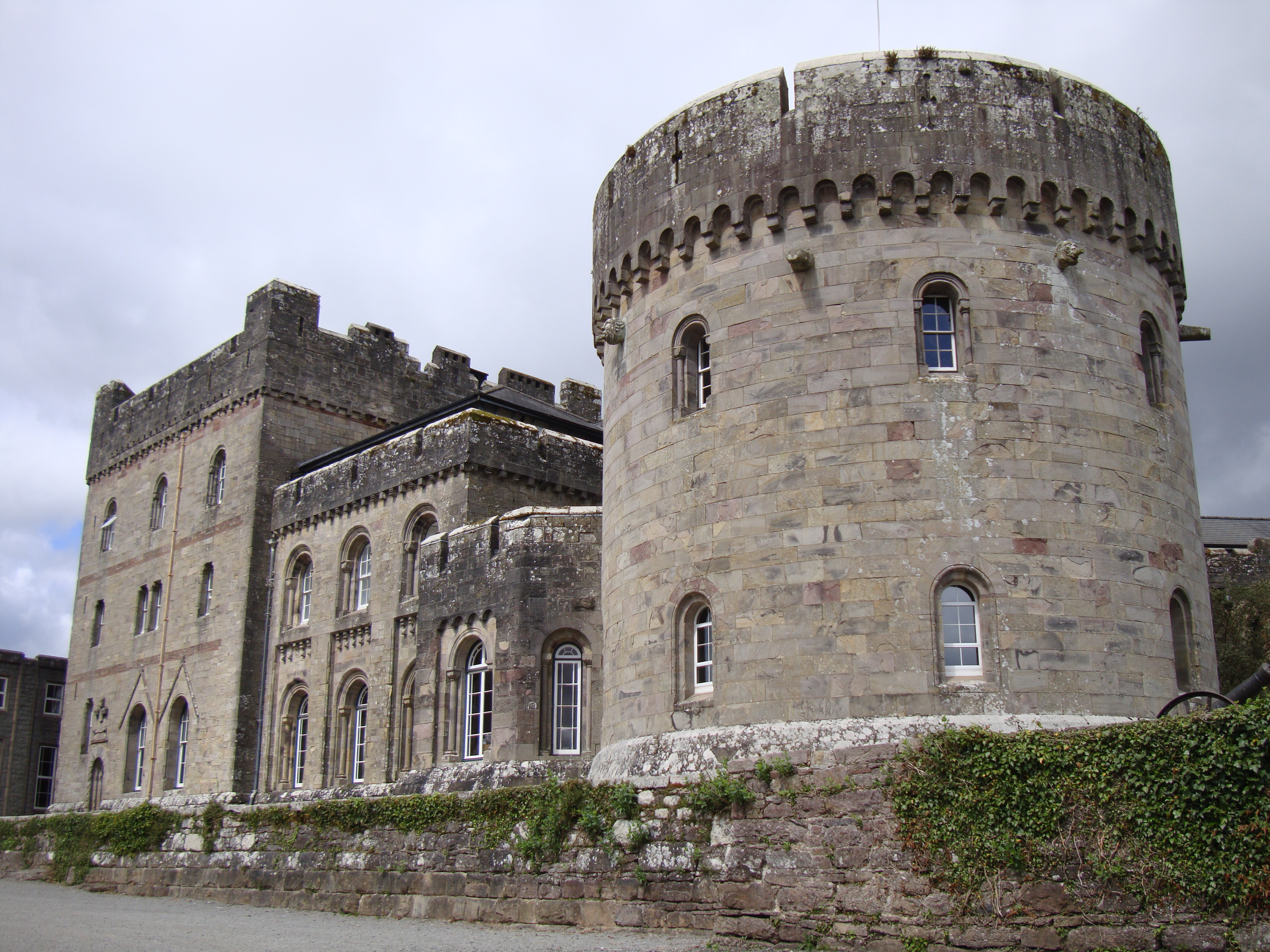
- Interactive map of Glenstal Abbey

Monastery information
- Order: Benedictine
- Established: 1927
- Mother house: Maredsous Abbey
- Dedication: Saint Joseph & Saint Columba
- Diocese: Cashel and Emly

People
- Abbot: Columba McCann OSB
- Prior: Lino Moreira OSB

Architecture
- Status: Active
- Style: Norman Revivalist

Site
- Location: Murroe, County Limerick
- Country: Ireland
- Coordinates: 52°39′42″N 8°23′17″W
- Public access: Yes
- Website: glenstal.com/abbey

Glenstal Abbey is a Catholic Benedictine monastery of the Congregation of the Annunciation located in Murroe, County Limerick, Ireland. It is dedicated to Saint Joseph and Saint Columba. In July 2024, Dom Columba McCann was elected to serve as the seventh abbot of the community.

== History ==
The abbey is located in and beside Glenstal Castle, a Normanesque castle. The house was built for Sir Matthew Barrington, who, in 1818, purchased part of Lord Carbery's Limerick estate. Designed as a castle in 12th-century style, it was built in the 1830s. The village of Glenstal grew from the construction of the abbey. Many of the builders and craftsmen who came to construct the Abbey ended up settling in the area.

Sir Charles Burton Barrington, 5th Baronet inherited the estate from his father in 1890. In 1921, his daughter, Winifred, was killed in an IRA ambush of a Royal Irish Constabulary inspector with whom she was travelling. The family then decided to relocate to Fairthorne Manor in Hampshire, England.

Barrington first offered the property to the Irish Free State for a presidential residence, but in light of the anticipated cost of maintenance, the government declined. In 1925, at the suggestion of Fr Richard Devane, professor at St Patrick's College, Thurles, and John Harty, Archbishop of Cashel and Emly, Monsignor James J. Ryan, retired president of St. Patrick's College, purchased the estate from the family with the intent to establish a Benedictine school there.

The abbey came into being in 1927 when the chapter of Maredsous Abbey in Belgium accepted Ryan's offer to donate the estate for a monastery there. Later that year, a superior, Fr Bernard O'Dea, was appointed and the founding monks were chosen. They arrived in Glenstal in May 1927. The abbey was canonically erected on 18 December 1927. The monks became legal owners of the estate in January 1928 after receiving the deeds.

Like many other religious organisations, Glenstal Abbey was faced with allegations of child abuse. Since 1975 ten accusations against six monks were filed. In a 2014 report, The National Board for Safeguarding Children (NBSC) stated that the Benedictine community handled these accusations well with proper action, including removal from monastic life and treatment.

The abbey released commercial Gregorian chant albums in the late 1990s as The Monks of Glenstal Abbey, also contributing to the multi-platinum-selling Faith of our Fathers in 1996. The monks of Glenstal Abbey, feature as part of the interval act during the 1995 Eurovision Song Contest, in Dublin, Lumen, composed by Mícheál Ó Súilleabháin who has a long association with the Abbey.

== School ==
The monastery runs an all-boys boarding secondary school on its grounds, Glenstal Abbey School, home to around 200 students.

In October 2026, the school announced that it would close by August 2028 at the latest and cited two factors contributing to the decision through an internal assessment, the rising costs of operating a small boarding school combined with a declining demand for boarding education. The abbey had apparently been contemplating a closure for many years prior to this announcement and had tried to avert this outcome. The decision was perceived with surprise by the wider Glenstal community, with parents and former students suggesting exploring alternative options to its closure, although the abbey's announcement stated that they had "sought to support" the school "financially, to strengthen enrolment and to consider whether changes to the School's model could secure a sustainable future" prior to the announcement of a closure.

== Alumni ==
- Paddy Cosgrave
- John Magnier

== Grounds ==
The picturesque grounds include lakes, forests and an old walled, terraced garden which features a "bible garden". From 1986, Fr Brian P. Murphy OSB worked with volunteers to restore the gardens. In 2004 he published the book Glensta; Abbey Gardens on the history of the gardens. The abbey also runs a 250-acre (100 hectare) dairy farm.

== Abbots and priors ==
Currently, abbots are elected for an eight-year period. Before 1957, the superior had the title of prior. From 1927 until 1945, the prior was appointed by the parent abbey of Maredsous in Belgium.

- Prior Bede Lebbe OSB (to 1938)
- Prior Idesbald Ryelandt OSB (1938–1945)
- Prior Bernard O'Dea OSB (1945–1952)
- Prior Placid Murray OSB DD (1952–1957)
- Abbot Joseph Dowdall OSB (1957–1966)
- Abbot Agustine O'Sullivan OSB (1966–1980)
- Abbot Celestine Cullen OSB (1980–1992)
- Abbot Christopher Dillon OSB (1992–2008)
- Abbot Mark Patrick Hederman OSB (2008–2016)
- Abbot Brendan Coffey OSB (2016–2024)
- Abbot Columba McCann OSB (2024-)
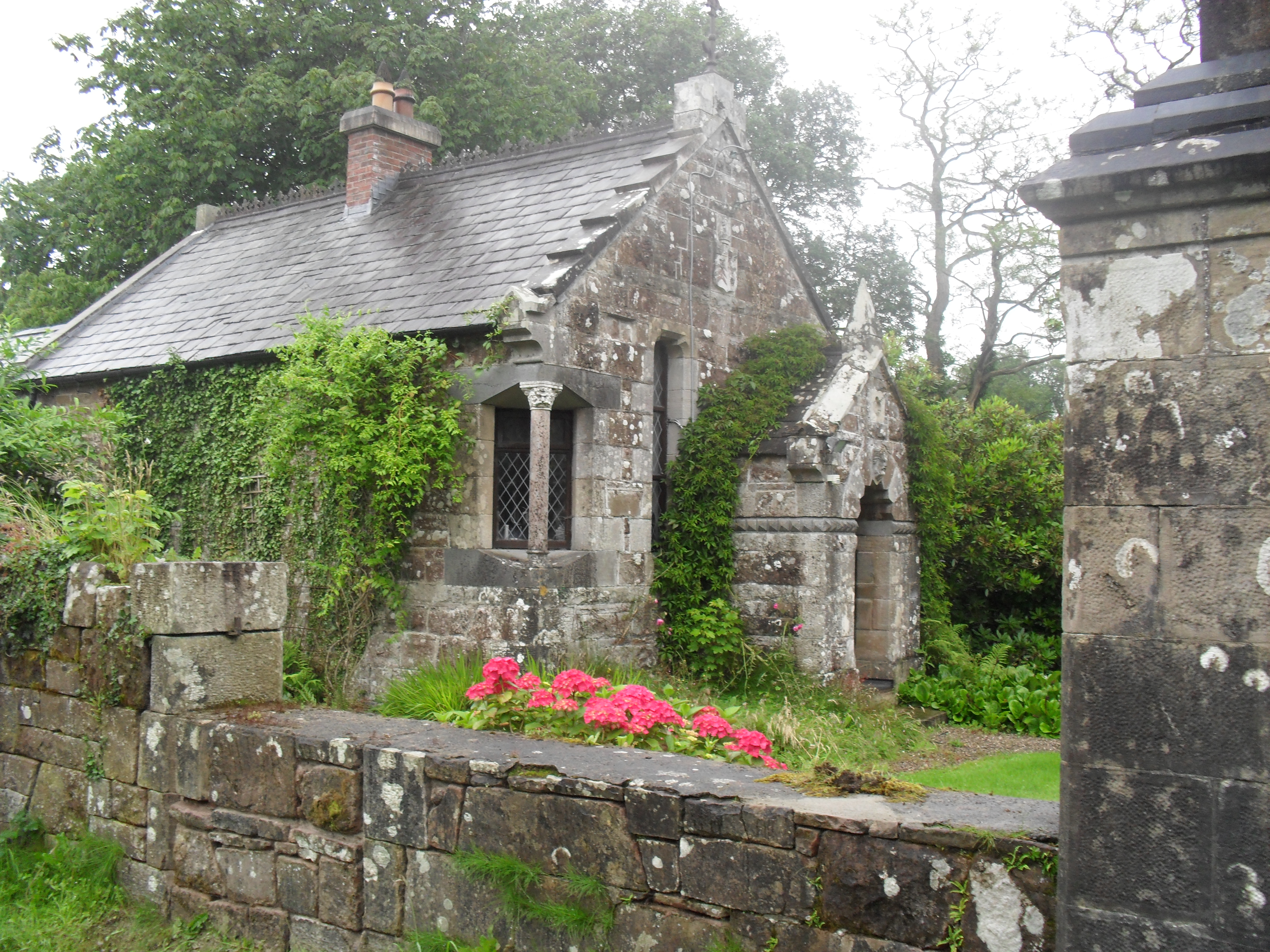
Gatehouse

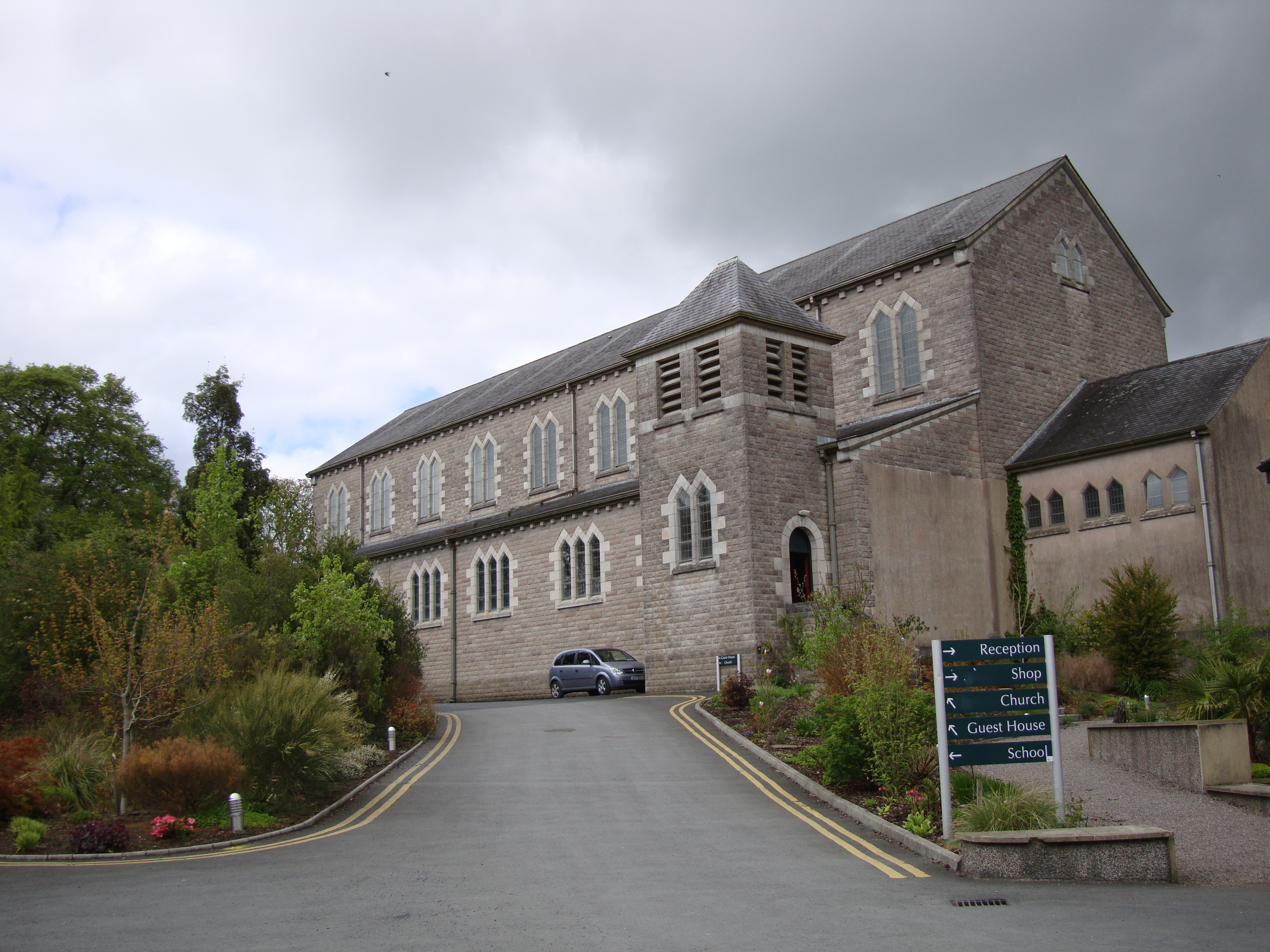
Church (outside)

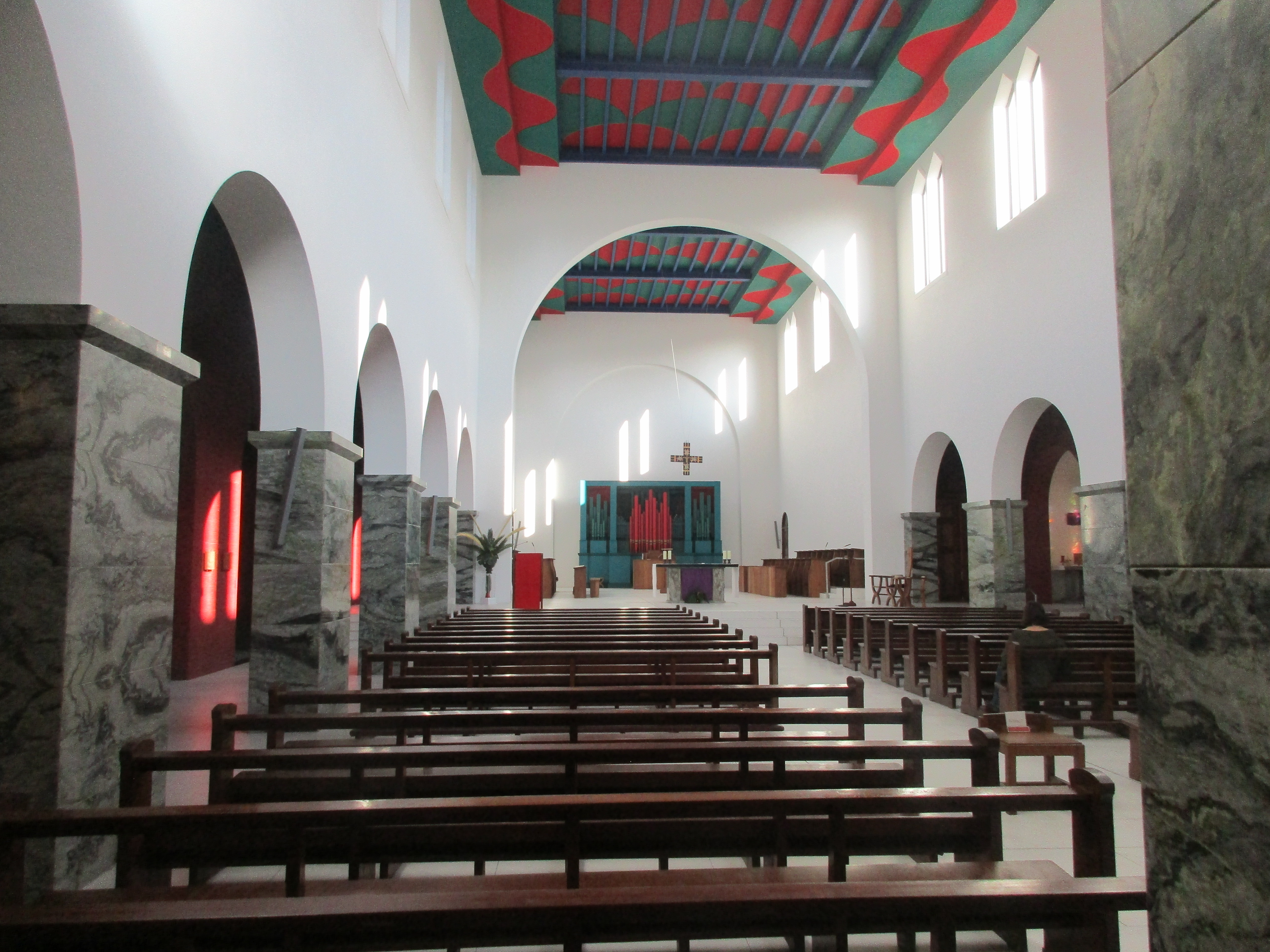
Church (inside)

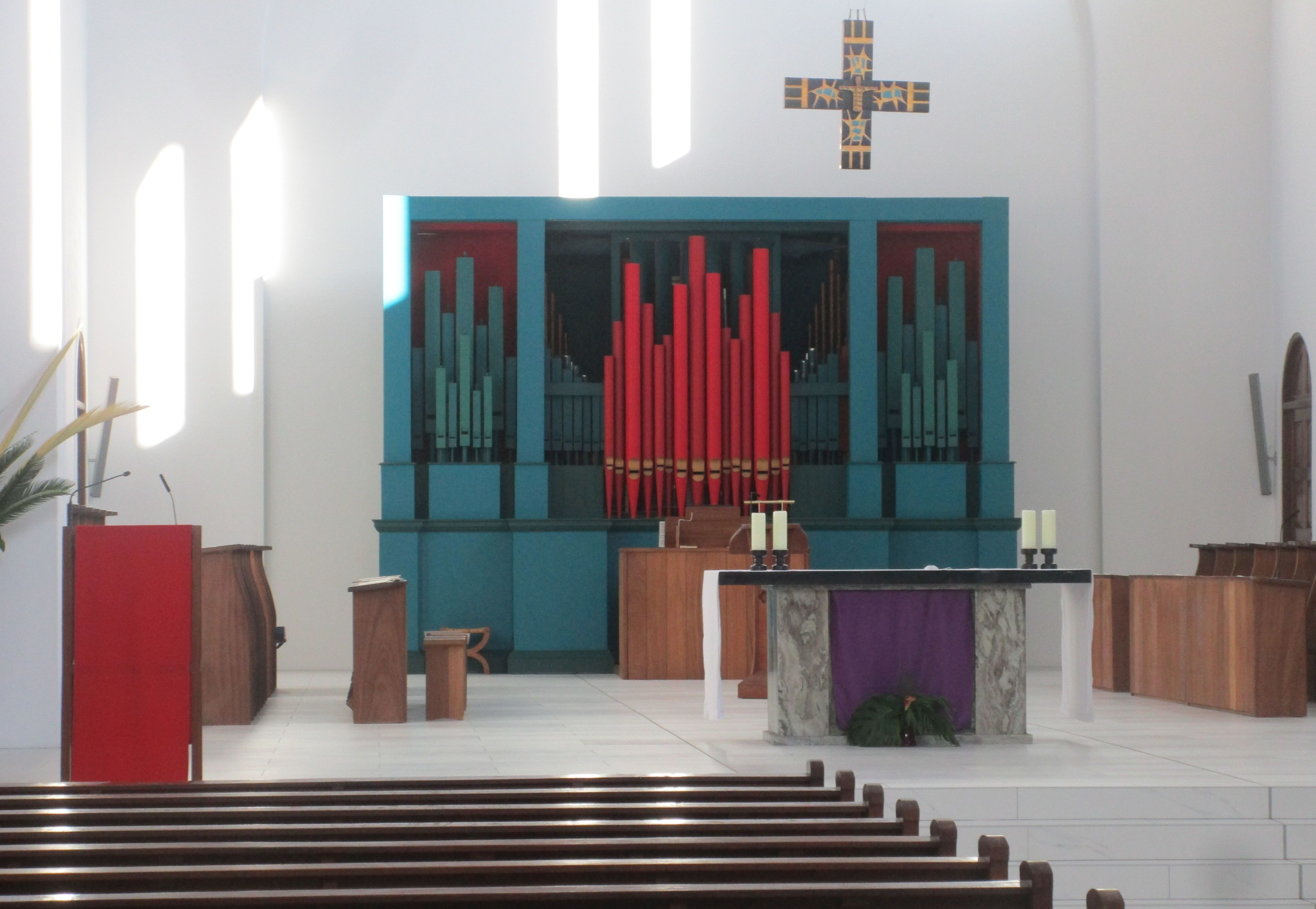
Organ

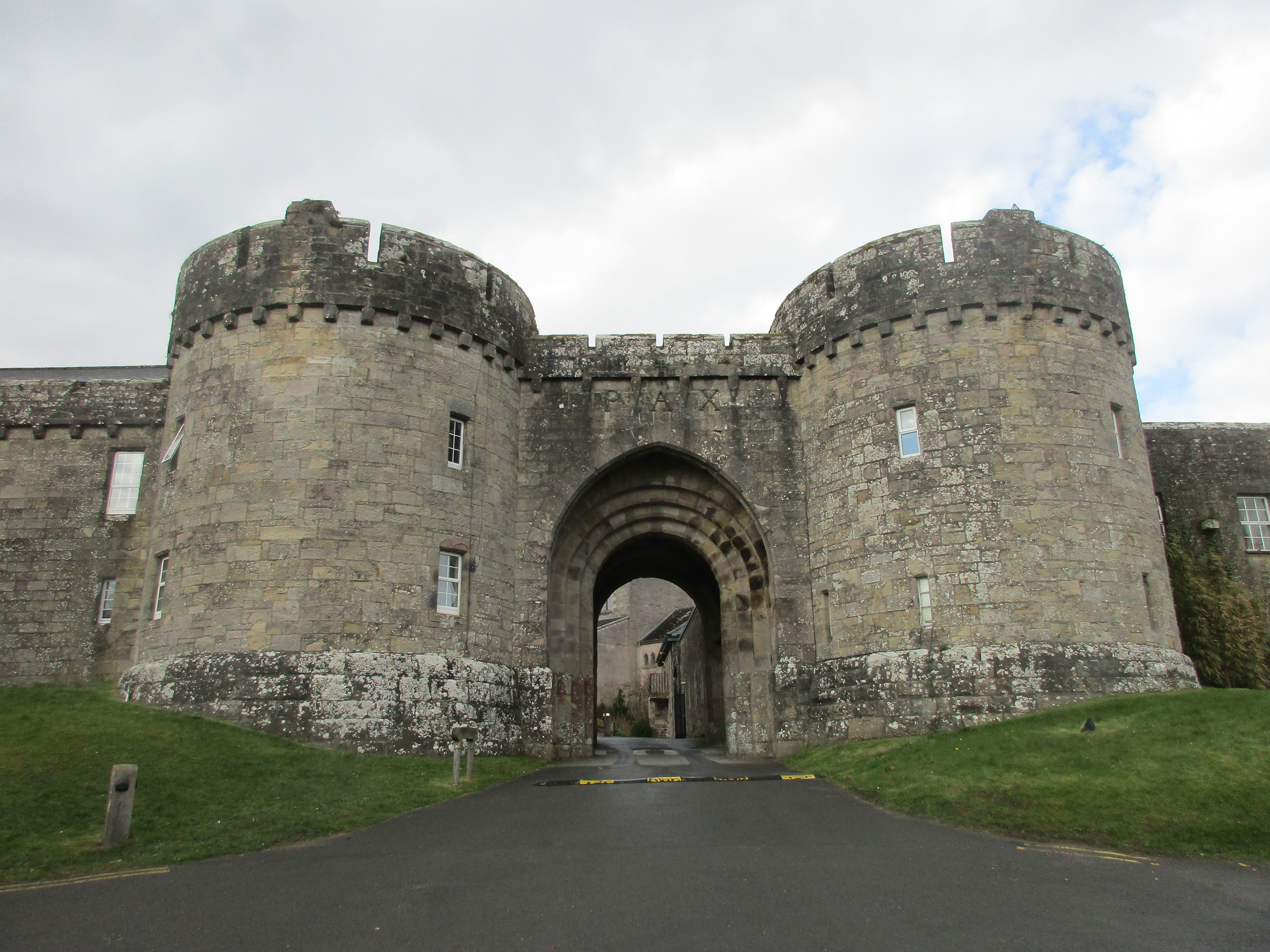
Entrance of Glenstal Abbey

== See also ==
- List of abbeys and priories in Ireland (County Limerick)
