= Bry (singer) =

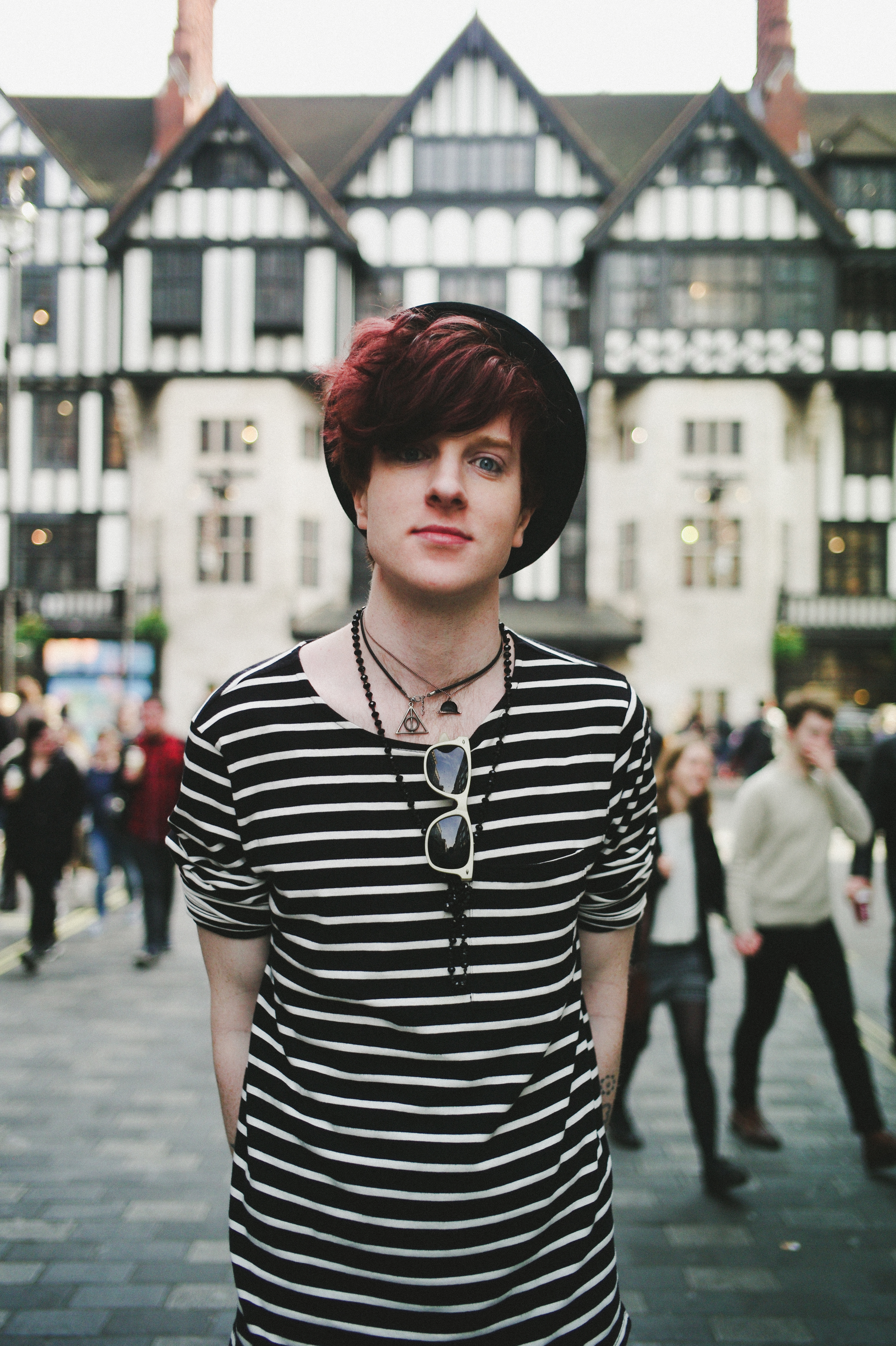
- Bry in London, 2017

Background information
- Born: Brian O'Reilly; 16 February 1988 (age 37); Dublin, Ireland
- Occupations: Musician; singer; songwriter
- Instruments: Guitar, piano
- Years active: 2012–present

Bry O'Reilly (born Brian O'Reilly; 16 February 1988), known professionally as Bry (formerly BriBry), is an Irish singer/songwriter from Dublin.

Bry's eponymous debut album, Bry, was released on 11 November 2016. At the time of the album's release, Bry was opening for Twenty One Pilots on the European leg of their Emotional Roadshow World Tour.

== Career ==
Bry originally performed under the name "BriBry". He operated without a manager, booking agent or record label for four years, booking a trip overseas, tweeting his intention to be in a certain spot in a city at a set time, and then waiting with his guitar to see who might show up. This approach drew 80 people to Central Park and 150 more to Singapore. This first-hand market research encouraged the singer to book tours of more conventional venues, and led to sell-out tours of Australia and the UK in 2013 and 2014.

In late 2014, a word-of-mouth recommendation from a friend led Jonny Quinn, Snow Patrol drummer and founder (alongside bandmates Gary Lightbody and Nathan Connolly) of Polar Patrol Publishing, to check out the singer-songwriter's YouTube channel.

In 2015, Bry toured the UK, Ireland, Australia and New Zealand.

In November 2015, it was announced on his secondary YouTube channel that he would be flying to Los Angeles to record his debut studio album. The album, eponymously titled Bry, was released on 11 November 2016.

In February 2016, Bry announced his next UK and Ireland tour, which would have 18 dates throughout April. In September 2016, it was announced that he would be supporting Twenty One Pilots on their European tour.

== Philanthropy ==
From January 2013 to early 2015, Bry fronted an online campaign known as Cut Cake Not Wrists, a charity that supported young people going through self-harm. In May 2015 it was announced in a video that the campaign had ended for a number of reasons. However, Bry continues to raise awareness for mental health issues and a number of other causes, including LGBT rights and a cancer charity in memory of his friend Ross, who died from cancer in 2010.

== Discography ==
Albums

- Bry by Bry (2016)

EPs

- Your Life Over Mine (2012)
- Grow (2013)
- Us (2014)
- Love Pop Suicide (2018)

Singles

- "Staying Together" (2012)
- "Don't Go Alone" (2016)
- "You're Alright" (2016)
- "Don't Get Closer" (2017)
- "Miserable" (2018)
- "Burn" (2018)
- "Why Are You Bothering With Me" (2019)

== Tours ==
- Support for Twenty One Pilots' Emotional Roadshow World Tour (2016)
- Bry On Tour, Ireland, UK and other countries in Europe (2016–2017)
- Bye Bye Bry Tour, UK and Europe (2018) – CANCELLED
- UK and Europe – Comeback Tour (2019)
