= Fiach Moriarty =

Irish Musician and Singer-Songwriter

- Born: Dublin, Ireland
- Genres: Acoustic, folk
- Occupations: Songwriter, musician, TV presenter, voiceover artist
- Instruments: Vocals, piano, violin, guitar, mandolin
- Label: Marcella Records
- Website: www.fiachmusic.com

Fiach Moriarty is an Irish musician and songwriter from Dublin, Ireland. His debut album So I came out in 2010; it appeared in the Irish top 100 album chart and peaked at 62. His second album was released in April 2015 and debuted at number 29 in the Irish chart. As well as being a solo performer, Fiach is also a member of the band ALDOC.

== Early life ==
At the age of 5, Fiach Moriarty began to learn the violin at school in Inchicore. He states that he grew up with traditional Irish folk music in the home but was also influenced by Mozart and Beethoven, due to his mother's piano playing. At the age of 12, he received his first guitar as a birthday gift and began writing songs, influenced by Nirvana and The Beatles.

== Career ==
In 2010, Moriarty released his debut record (released as 'Fiach'), So I, which appeared in the Irish top 100 album chart. In 2015, Moriarty released his second album, The Revolution, drawing on inspiration from the 1916 Easter Rising and World War 1.

For Christmas 2016, Moriarty collaborated with John Byrne and Duncan Maitland, releasing a Christmas single, "In Love at Christmas Time".

In Autumn 2017, Jingle Jangle, a six-episode musical travel show hosted by Moriarty, Jim Lockhart (Horslips) and Fiachna Ó Braonáin (Hothouse Flowers), aired on Irish television station be3. It featured Brian Kennedy, Una Healy, Duke Special, Mundy and other Irish musicians.

He has performed on tour with Ray Davies, Mary Black, Eddi Reader, Damien Dempsey and Declan O'Rourke. In 2017, Moriarty lent his guitar and vocals live, in studio and on television to Damien Dempsey, ALDOC, Pauline Scanlon and Beoga.

In 2019, Moriarty lent his voice as narrator to the Phil Lynott documentary Scéalta ón Old Town, which aired on RTÉ 1. From 2019 to 2021 he was a member of The Late Late Show house band, performing every Friday night. In 2022, it was announced that Moriarty would be joining Horslips as lead guitarist for a run of gigs.

In 2024, Moriarty put out his first solo release in five years, the song I'm for Gallipoli, a duet with Damien Dempsey as the lead-in single for his upcoming album. His third album, Liberties, was released on October 18, 2024.

I'm for Gallipoli was nominated for Best Original Folk Track in the 2025 RTÉ Radio 1 Folk Awards.

In January 2026, the song Dúlra Scriosta, written by Moriarty with lyrics by Carlow historian Dave Barron, won the National Pan Celtic Song Contest. The song, tackling the challenges faced by Ireland's biodiversity, was performed by Clara Hutchinson.

== Discography ==
- So I (album) – 2010
- Married to Music (single) – 2013
- The Revolution – 2015
- In Love At Christmas Time (released as HoneyPie) – 2016
- Mr Blue Sky (Degrees of Light charity album) – 2017
- Everything Will Rhyme (single) – 2019
- I'm For Gallipoli (single) – 2024
- Liberties (album) – 2024
- The Death Of MacNeill (single) – 2026
