= Niamh Ní Charra =

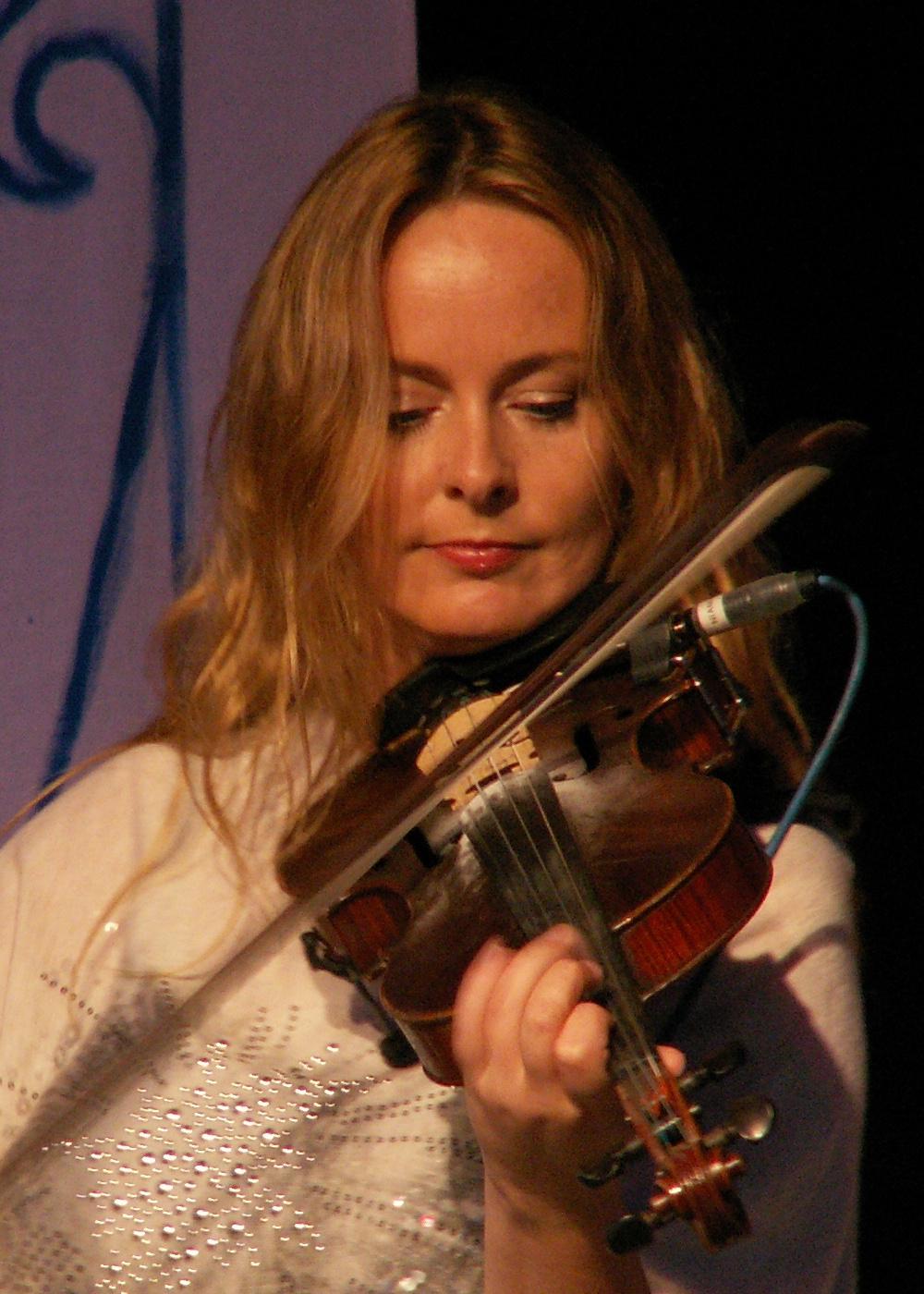
- Ní Charra in 2012

Background information
- Born: Killarney, County Kerry, Ireland
- Genres: Celtic, folk
- Occupation(s): Musician, singer
- Instrument(s): Fiddle, concertina, voice
- Years active: 1998–present
- Website: www.niamhnicharra.com

Niamh Ní Charra is an Irish fiddler, concertina player and singer from Killarney, Ireland.

== Early life ==
At the age of four, Ní Charra started playing music. She has performed in 2500 shows touring 8 years as a soloist with Riverdance before returning to Ireland.

Her first solo album, Ón Dá Thaobh/From Both Sides, was released in 2007, and was followed by a second, Súgach Sámh / Happy Out, in 2010. Both albums were well received, after which Ní Charra received awards including Mojo's Top Ten Folk Albums of 2007 and Irish World's Best Trad Music Act 2008, In 2013, Ní Charra released "Cuz", a tribute to Kerry and Chicago musician, Terry 'Cuz' Teahan. This album also received positive reviews.

Ní Charra has also toured as a member of the Carlos Núñez band.

== Discography ==
=== Solo albums ===
- 2007 Ón Dá Thaobh/From Both Sides
- 2010 Súgach Sámh / Happy Out
- 2013 "Cuz"
- 2020 "Donnelly's Arm"

=== Collaborations ===
- 2011 The Basque Irish Connection, Ibon Koteron

=== Guest Roles ===
- 2010 San Patricio (album), The Chieftains
- 2009 Alborada do Brasil (album), Carlos Núñez
- 2016 KeltiK (Album), Xabi Aburruzaga
