= Chris Singleton (musician) =

- Born: Christopher Matthew Eamonn Singleton; 1977 (age 47–48); Dublin, Ireland
- Origin: Wicklow, Ireland
- Occupation(s): Singer, songwriter
- Website: www.chrissingletonmusic.com

Chris Singleton is a singer/songwriter from Wicklow, Ireland. Based in London, he has released two solo albums to date: Twisted City and Lady Gasoline. He currently fronts glam rock band Five Grand Stereo.

== Early life ==
Christopher Matthew Eamonn Singleton was born in Dublin, Ireland on 21 July 1977, the son of the well-known English linguist Professor David Singleton. Chris' interest in writing music began at an early age (11), after he worked out how to play albums on his father's record player. The album which held particular interest for him, and which he cites as a starting point for his involvement in music, was Revolver by The Beatles. The Beatles became a major influence in his songwriting, which he developed throughout his 20s. Music lessons came from a local choir and Irish singer-songwriter Dominic Mulvany, the latter teaching him piano and showing him rudimentary recording techniques on a four-track tape recorder.

== Career ==
Chris studied Theatre Studies in Trinity College, Dublin from 1995 to 1999. After graduating he founded the group "The Lennies", a quirky band with an ever-changing line-up. Chris was the songwriter in the group and his drama background was reflected in the group's theatrical output – their music was often described as 'pop opera'. The band recorded an album called 'Sex and Money', which in 2001 attracted the attention of members of the London music industry. For a while the band were managed by London management company Mumbo Jumbo (most notable for their involvement with Chikinki), before Chris decided to go solo in 2002, deciding that the unstable nature of the band meant that a solo career was preferable to working in a group with no fixed line-up. He was subsequently represented by veteran producer Roger Bechirian.

=== Twisted City ===
In 2003, Chris decided to take a more "DIY" approach to his career and with the help of some contacts in the London music industry began recording an album called Twisted City. A self-engineered and produced album, it took a couple of years to complete. The album was conceived as a tube journey through London; every song was a 'stop on the line' and dealt with Chris' (often traumatic) experiences of the city, both personal and professional. The album was mastered in May 2006 by well-known engineer Geoff Pesche (Coldplay, Gorillaz, Kylie Minogue) at Abbey Road Studios, London and was released in the UK and Ireland in September 2006 by Right Track/Universal Music Operations. Given the association between the album and the tube, the launch event for the album took place on the London Underground in August 2006 and attracted coverage from ITV News and BBC Radio. Twisted City received a warm welcome from rock critics, receiving positive reviews from The Irish Times, Hot Press, Clash Magazine and The Daily Express amongst others. The influences on the record are quite apparent and primarily include The Beatles, David Bowie and The Kinks.

=== Lady Gasoline ===
Chris Singleton's second album, Lady Gasoline, was released on 28 June 2010 through IRL, an independent label whose other artists include Damien Dempsey, The Wonder Stuff and Sharon Shannon. Featuring a more overtly pop sound than Twisted City, and drawing on a wider range of influences (the Lady Gasoline press release cited a diverse range of influences including Lou Reed, eighties electropop, glam rock and The Stone Roses), reviews were generally positive. Music Week described it as "packed full of musical depth and surefire radio hits", Q magazine praised its eclecticism and Ireland's Sunday Business Post gave it a four star review, praising it for having "yearning lyrics, poetic metaphors and an agreeable dose of spite". A dissenting voice came from The Irish Times' Lauren Murphy, who felt the album amounted to "pedestrian pop" and described Singleton's battle with hyperacusis as an "angle". The record was produced by Chris Singleton and like Twisted City was mastered at Abbey Road, but this time by Steve Rooke, the engineer responsible for the 2009 Beatles remasters.

=== Unusual gigs ===
To promote Twisted City, and because of the association the album has with London transport, Singleton has done a number of strange gigs: he launched the Twisted City album on the London Underground, and subsequently performed in several strange locations, including a taxi, tube, bus and boat. Another series of strange gigs, his Monopoly Tour, based on the locations on the famous board game, took place in September 2007 to promote his double A-side single, "Pieces / Gimme Something". Chris Singleton is also known for his gigs where he performs live on his own online using the Internet streaming service uStream.

=== Five Grand Stereo ===
In January 2014 Singleton announced a new band project, Five Grand Stereo, composed of several members of his previous backing band The Distractions and two new members, Jane Fraser (vocals) and Michael Kirkland (keyboards and saxophone). The band released their debut album, 'Sex and Money' in 2018.

== Hyperacusis ==
In 2005 Chris Singleton was diagnosed with hyperacusis, an oversensitivity to sound where everyday, 'normal' sounds are perceived as painfully loud. Following hearing therapy, Chris overcame the condition, but it delayed the recording and release of 'Twisted City'. In 2010, Singleton was interviewed on BBC Breakfast about the condition and how he overcame it to record Lady Gasoline.

== Style Factory ==
In 2009, Chris Singleton founded a website design and digital marketing publication called Style Factory. This is a tech reviews and comparison site that mainly covers e-commerce solutions like Shopify, BigCommerce and Squarespace.

== Discography ==
=== Albums ===
- Twisted City (18 September 2006), released through Brownpaper Records, Right Track and Universal Music Operations.
- Lady Gasoline (28 June 2010 in Ireland / 23 May 2011 in UK), released through IRL Records.
- Sex and Money (18 January worldwide) — a Five Grand Stereo album released through Brownpaper Records.

=== Singles ===
- Worry Number One (18 September 2006) BRCDS01CS, released through Brownpaper Records, Right Track and Universal Music Operations.
- Get Up (22 January 2007) BRCDS02CS, released through Brownpaper Records, Right Track and Universal Music Operations.
- Tonight (18 April 2007) BRCDS03CS, released through Brownpaper Records, Right Track and Universal Music Operations.
- Pieces/Gimme Something (17 September 2007) BRCDS04CS, double A-side single released through Brownpaper Records, Right Track and Universal Music Operations.
- Lady Gasoline (28 June 2010) IRLDSX046
- Lose It (11 October 2011)

Singleton also released a "virtual audio cassette" in October 2007 – a viral offering, containing two free songs; in December 2007, he followed Radiohead's example by making Twisted City temporarily available as a free album.
