= Laura Cunningham =

Irish singer

Laura Cunningham is a magazine journalist from Dublin, Ireland, previously known for her role in Irish Traditional girl group Trinití. Trinití was signed to Universal Classics and Jazz in 2006 and released their self-titled album later that year.

After the group disbanded in early 2008, Cunningham began writing a syndicated 2 page style/beauty column for The Voice Newspaper Group. She was also a fashion presenter for Ireland AM, TV3's breakfast show and wrote fashion for Glow Magazine. She was also radio fashion correspondent for SPIN 1038 and Dublin's 98. She now serves as an editor for wedding magazine Confetti and recently launched the website Hippenings.com, which sells wedding and party products.
