= Máire Ní Ghuairim =

Irish teacher, writer, and singer

Máire Ní Ghuairim (6 July 1896 – 15 October 1964) was an Irish teacher, writer and sean-nós singer.

== Biography ==
Born in Roisin na Manach, Carna, County Galway, the eldest daughter of Mairtin Gorham and Catherine Burke. Her younger sister was Sorcha Ní Ghuairim. She was educated locally, at Clifden and Tuam, moving to Dublin to teach Irish at Carysfort teacher training college in Blackrock. While in Dublin she became active in the Irish language movement, joining both Conradh na Gaeilge and Comhairle an Fhainne about 1924.

From 1919 she published stories and essays in publications such as Stoc, Fainne an Lae, An Lochrann, An tÉireannach, An Scuab and An Chearnog. She broadcast as a singer on 2RN and Radio Éireann, recording an Irish language course for Linguaphone.

She married Sean Mac Bradaigh, TD, on 12 September 1929, and had two daughters and two sons. She died at her home in Ranelagh.
