= Christine Buckley =

Irish activist

- Buckley in 2009
- Born: 10 October 1946; London
- Died: 11 March 2014 (aged 67); Dublin

Christine Buckley (10 October 1946 – 11 March 2014) was an Irish activist and campaigner, who served as the director of the Aislinn support and education group for survivors of Industrial Schools in Ireland. She was raised in St. Vincent's Industrial School, Goldenbridge.

== Life and death ==
The daughter of a Nigerian medical student and a married Irish woman from Dublin, she was abandoned at three weeks of age and grew up in Goldenbridge industrial school. She went through primary and, unlike many industrial school children, secondary school, eventually qualifying as a nurse. In 1985 she contacted her mother, and in 1988 she contacted her father.

She spoke of her childhood on The Gay Byrne Show in November 1992. During the interview she was asked about her childhood and she described her experience of St. Vincent's Industrial School, Goldenbridge. She worked with Louis Lentin on the documentary Dear Daughter, which dealt with both her own experiences and those of other victims of sexual abuse at Goldenbridge.

In 2003, she called on Fianna Fáil Minister for Education Noel Dempsey to resign after he proposed that the Commission investigate only sample allegations of abuse instead of the 1800 complaints. After the Commission report was published, she spoke of being filled with anger though she should have been filled with hope. In June 2009, she took part in a wreath-laying ceremony and a march of solidarity with victims of abuse in industrial schools. Up to 10,000 people took part in the march. In June 2009 she criticised a letter to priests by Pope Benedict XVI on the grounds that it used vague language and that it may have concealed rather than acknowledged the wrongs done.

She died on 11 March 2014, after a long battle with breast cancer.

== Legacy and Christine Buckley Award ==
Christine Buckley was the recipient of the Irish 'Volunteer of the Year' award in 2009, winning the European Volunteer of the Year looks at a variety award in Strasbourg later that year. Upon her death in 2014, Volunteer Ireland announced the renaming of their overall Volunteer of the Year award in honour of Christine Buckley. Awardees include:

- 2014 – Jim Kavanagh, Chernobyl Children International
- 2015 – Matt Cullen, Swords Tidy Towns
- 2016 – David McEvoy, Birr First Responders
- 2017 – Sister Patrica Wall (a.k.a. the "Flying Nun")
- 2018 – Mary Fitzgerald, Clare Haven Services for domestic abuse survivors, County Clare
- 2019 – Owodunni 'Ola' Mustapha, asylum seeker, organiser of Residents Committee in Direct Provision Centre, Ballyhaunis, County Mayo, MASI contributor and activist

== Honours ==
In December 2012, Trinity College, Dublin awarded her an honorary Doctor of Laws degree (LL.D) in recognition of her work for people who were subjected to institutional abuse. Presiding at the ceremony was former President of Ireland Mary Robinson in her capacity as Chancellor of the university.
