= Sorcha Ní Ghuairim =

Irish sean-nós singer

Sorcha Ní Ghuairim (11 October 1911 – 1976) was a teacher, writer, and sean-nós singer.

== Life ==
Sorcha Ní Ghuairim was born in Roisín na Manach, Carna in the Connemara Gaeltacht in County Galway on 11 October 1911. Her parents were Máirtín Gorham and Catherine Burke. She was the youngest of their 11 children. Ní Ghuairim was particularly well known as a singer. She joined her sister Máire Ní Ghuairim, in Dublin in 1928 and obtained a teaching post with Conradh na Gaeilge. She studied at University College Galway with Tomás Ó Máille. An active promoter of the Irish language revival, she wrote a column for The Irish Press under the name "Coisín Siúlach". She also wrote a column regularly for the children's page under the name "Niamh Chinn Óir", and later became an editor of the paper. She taught the Irish language at Trinity College Dublin from 1941 to 1955 and presented a programme on Radio Éireann called Abair Mar Seo É.

She was a frequent judge at Oireachtas na Gaeilge signing competitions in the 1940s. She recorded her first album, Sorcha Ní Ghuairim Sings Traditional Irish Songs, issued as Folkways Records FW06861, while visiting her brother in the United States in 1947.

She moved to England in 1955, apparently disillusioned with the future of the Irish language. She was found dead in her apartment in London, and appeared to have been dead for a period of time. Some sources do not state an exact date of death, where others give it as 15 December 1976. She was buried in Carna on 24 December 1976.

The National University of Ireland, Galway's outreach centre in Carna is named in her honour, Áras Shorcha Ní Ghuairim. In 2007, a documentary on Ní Ghuairim was aired on TG4, An Lorg Shorcha.
