= Regina Nathan =

Irish soprano (born 1960)

- Born: 1960 (age 65–66); Kuala Lumpur, Malaysia
- Origin: Dublin, Ireland
- Genre: Opera
- Occupation: Soprano

Regina Nathan (born 17 August 1960) is an Irish soprano.

== Biography ==
Nathan was born in Kuala Lumpur, Malaysia, and was raised in Dublin. She studied at St Patrick's College, Maynooth, the College of Music, Dublin (now the DIT Conservatory of Music and Drama), Trinity College of Music, London and at the National Opera Studio. She represented Ireland at the 1991 Cardiff Singer of the World Competition, has performed with Placido Domingo in Dublin and proclaimed as Ireland's outstanding New Entertainer of the year in 1991. She has worked with a number of orchestras including the RTÉ Concert Orchestra.

In 1994 she was the subject of an hour long documentary made for RTÉ by Louis Lentin, The Quality of Rapture.

Nathan performed on four of the twenty tracks of the multi-platinum selling compilation album Faith of Our Fathers.

Nathan has given world premières of contemporary works, including John Buckley's Maynooth Te Deum (1995) and Mark-Anthony Turnage's The Country of the Blind (1997). She taught at the DIT Conservatory of Music and Drama between 2005 and 2007.
