= The Gay Byrne Show =

Irish radio programme

- Other names: The Gay Byrne Hour
- Genre: News and current affairs
- Running time: 2 hours
- Country of origin: Ireland
- Language: English
- Home station: RTÉ Radio 1
- TV adaptations: The Late Late Show
- Hosted by: Gay Byrne
- Produced by: John Caden
- Recording studio: Donnybrook, Dublin
- Original release: 2 February 1973 – 24 December 1998

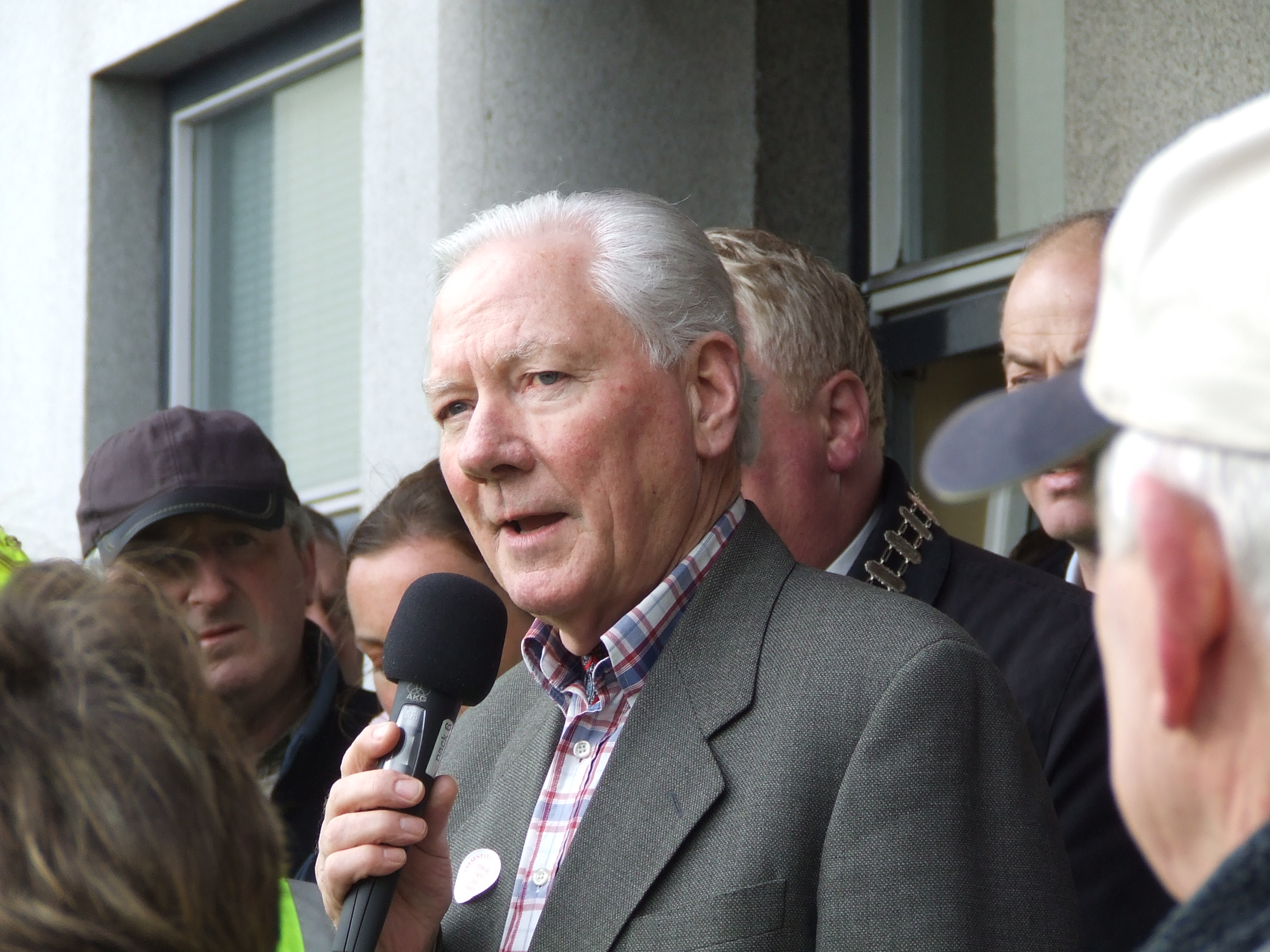
Gay Byrne, the show's presenter

The Gay Byrne Show (previously The Gay Byrne Hour and also known as The GB Show) is an Irish radio programme which ran from 1973 until 1998. The programme was presented by Gay Byrne, and aired Monday to Friday for two hours each day. Before Byrne's retirement in 1998, he was helped by Gareth O'Callaghan (who left for RTÉ 2fm) and then Des Cahill. Future Labour Party face Alex White edited the show for four years.

== History ==
The Gay Byrne Hour began broadcasting on 2 February 1973. It featured many Irish taboo subjects, with forums and discussions.

In 1979, because of an extended air time, the programme was retitled The Gay Byrne Show. The show's reporter was Joe Duffy. In 1976, Byrne won a Jacob's Award for his programme. Duffy also won a Jacob's Award in 1992.

In 1984, the show received letters in response to a report by Kevin O'Connor on the death of schoolgirl Ann Lovett from childbirth. Byrne and two actors read on air stories of rape, abortion and sexual abuse.

Christine Buckley was invited with her father onto the show in 1992 to discuss her experiences at St. Vincent's Industrial School, Goldenbridge, receiving what she later described as an "overwhelming response".

== End ==
Speculation that Byrne would leave his show began in January 1998. In August of that year, a spokeswoman for the Director of Radio confirmed the show would end.

On 16 December 1998, while presenting his programme in Studio 5, Mike Murphy interrupted the programme and escorted a surprised Byrne into Studio 1. An audience of 150 celebrities and guests greeted Byrne. The then-Taoiseach Bertie Ahern and President Mary McAleese were among the guests.

The final show was broadcast on Grafton Street, on Christmas Eve (24 December) 1998.

"The output of those involved was phenomenal, and utterly mad".

— Byrne on presenting his radio live.

Byrne later spoke of his regret at not having retired from presenting the show five years earlier. He also claimed that the craziest thing he had ever done was present the show live for so long.

== Legacy ==
The influential show and the life of presenter was celebrated in the 2006 twenty-part book series Lives That Shaped the Nation, a collection by the Irish Independent which documented the lives of significant figures in Irish history. Others featured in the series included Bono, Éamon de Valera, James Joyce, Patrick Pearse, Mary Robinson, Oscar Wilde and W. B. Yeats.

Byrne commented in The Irish Times in 2010:

Constantly people remind me that they grew up with me as a daily presence. They were young wives at the time, stuck in the kitchen. Or they may be remembering when they were children and they were off sick and got off school for the day and the mammy would look after them and Gay Byrne was on the radio. The show was nothing to them, but it was what their mothers did: listen to the radio. You get the same messages over and over again from all over the world. To me, the wonder is that I am still getting messages from all kinds of weird places and the fact that they are listening to me. Because when I started they couldn’t hear me much beyond Moate. Now they listen in Manila. And the Toy Show meant a lot to people growing up. So, yes, I am conscious that I was part of people’s life".
