= Geraldine McMahon =

Irish musician

- Born: London, England
- Occupation(s): Harpist, singer

Geraldine McMahon ARCM is a British-born harpist and singer of Irish descent.

== Career ==
McMahon trained at the Royal College of Music in London, winning several prizes including a study scholarship at the Universität Mozarteum, Salzburg, Austria. She plays classical and Celtic music. She performed as a soloist for two years at Bunratty Castle in Ireland.

McMahon has performed around Europe and in the United States. She lived in the US for five years, in Chicago, Connecticut and New York City, appearing on US national television and radio. She has played before British royalty and has been a resident performer at the Savoy Hotel in London.

McMahon has issued an album of her own performances, Wings of Song, and another is planned.

McMahon is based in Hertfordshire, England.
