= Clare Quinn =

Irish soprano

Clare Celine Quinn is a classical soprano from Galway, Ireland.

In 2016 Clare was invited to sing in the world renowned music venue Carnegie Hall, New York after winning a first place and a Judges Distinction Award from American Protégé in the International Music Talent Competition.

In 2014 Clare became the "All Ireland Schools Talent Search" winner from an entry of 1,500 students across Ireland - she gained a lot of recognition for the win at the time, which was televised on Irish Television on TV3. She auditioned and was selected to perform on the iconic Late Late Toy Show at Christmas 2014, she performed Puccini's "Nessun Dorma", a performance described by the Irish Independent as "the performance of the night" Irish TV and Radio presenter Ryan Tubridy commented that she is " one of those talents that makes us sit up and pay attention, we think she will be a big name in years to come"

She has won many national titles at the Feis Ceoil in both classical and musical theatre genres. Clare has entered and won several local and national competitions including CU Factor and Street Angels.

She has performed for the President of Ireland, Michael D.Higgins at his residence in Aras An Uachtarain.

She has been the recipient of a High Achievers Award from the prestigious Royal Irish Academy of Music.
