= Charles J. Dunphie =

Irish journalist, critic, songwriter and poet

Charles James Dunphie (1820–1908) was an Irish journalist, art and literary critic, songwriter and poet.

== Life ==
He was born at Rathdowney on 4 November 1820, was elder son of Michael Dunphy of Rathdowney House, Rathdowney, Queen's County, Ireland, and of Fleet Street, Dublin, merchant, and his wife Kate Woodroffe. His younger brother, Henry Michael Dunphy (died 1889), who retained the early spelling of the name, was called to the bar at the Middle Temple on 26 January 1861, but became a journalist and critic, being for many years chief of the Morning Post's reporting staff in the House of Commons.

Charles Dunphie was educated at Trinity College, Dublin. Coming to London, he studied medicine at King's College Hospital, where he was a favourite pupil of Sir William Fergusson, but soon took to literature and journalism. For some years he was on The Times staff, and when the Crimean War broke out in 1853 he was offered the post of its special correspondent. But having lately married, he persuaded his colleague and countryman, William Howard Russell, to go in his stead.

During the war, he was one of the founders of the Patriotic Fund Journal (1854–55), a weekly miscellany of general literature, to which he contributed prose and verse under the pseudonym of 'Melopoyn,' the profits being devoted to the Patriotic Fund. In 1856 he left The Times to become art and dramatic critic to the Morning Post. which he continued until 1895.

Dunphie died at his house, 54 Finchley Road, on 7 July 1908, and was buried at Putney Vale cemetery.

== Family ==
On 31 March 1853, he married Jane, daughter of Luke Miller, governor of Ilford jail. Besides two sons, he left a daughter, Agnes Anne, wife of Sir George Anderson Critchett, 1st Baronet.

== Works ==
- The splendid advantages of being a woman. And other erratic essays. (1876)
- Wildfire. A collection of erratic essays. (1876)
- Sweet Sleep. A Course of Reading Intended to Promote That Delightful Enjoyment. (1879)
- Free Lance: Tiltings in many lists. (1881)
- The Chameleon. Fugitive pieces on many-coloured matters. (1888)
- Many-Coloured Essays (1906)
