= Kilmore Carols =

Set of Irish Christmas carols

The Kilmore Carols, sometimes also known as the Wexford Carols, is a cycle of traditional Irish Christmas carols sung each year in St. Mary's Church in the village of Kilmore, County Wexford, Ireland. Numbering thirteen in total, the carols are sung during the Twelve Days of Christmas. This tradition of carol singing at Kilmore is said to have begun in the mid-18th century and has continued up through the 21st century, forming a unique part of Christmas in Ireland. According to The Journal of Music, these carols form part of the "greatest body of Irish folk carols". Beginning in the late 20th century, several individual songs from the Kilmore Carols have been commercially recorded.

== History ==
The introduction of the tradition of carol singing at Kilmore is credited to Fr. Peter Devereux, who was the parish priest circa 1751. The carols of the cycle themselves are local to the area. Tradition assigns authorship of all of the carols to Fr. William Devereux, who was parish priest of Piercetown from 1730 to 1771. He compiled the carols in manuscript form as a collection called A New Garland, containing songs for Christmas circa 1728. However, some of the carols can in fact be traced to earlier authors. One of the carols ("Jerusalem, My Happy Home") was originally published anonymously in England in 1601. Three of the carols ("An angel this night", "This is St. Stephen's day", and "The first day of the year") are taken from A Smale Garland of Pious and Godly Songs by Bishop Luke Wadding, a collection of the Bishop's original Christian poetry, which was heavily influenced by his close reading of Richard Crashaw and the other Metaphysical poets, which was originally published at Ghent in 1684. Bishop Wadding, a Roman Catholic priest descended from the local Old English nobility, led and sought to rebuild the Diocese of Ferns during the aftermath of the Cromwellian conquest of Ireland and during the revived religious persecution of the Catholic Church in Ireland during the anti-Catholic show trials caused by the conspiracy theories Titus Oates, which heavily influenced Wadding's poetry. Of the other carols there are no known antecedents, suggesting that at least some were original compositions of Fr. William Devereux himself. The carols were once popular throughout the Barony of Forth, being first sung at the chapel in Kilrane; now, however, they are traditional only at the church in Kilmore. In the other parishes, such as Rathangan where carol singing was noted as late as 1872, the carols were apparently discouraged by Victorian era clergy who wished for greater conformity with the revival of Gregorian chant.

There are thirteen songs in the Kilmore Carols cycle; however, only eight are usually sung during a given Christmas time. Over time the melodies to some of the songs have been lost, with only six tunes extant. Several of the songs are therefore sung to the same tune, although in recent years some tunes have been reconstructed. The singers consist of six local men, always including a member of the Devereux family, who traditionally divide into two groups of three and sing alternate stanzas. This division, however, has not always been observed.

Beginning in the late 20th century the Kilmore Carols received additional coverage and attention. In 1977 and 1981, the carols were reported on by RTÉ. In 1982, Nóirín Ní Riain included some of the carols on her album Darkest Midnight; since then, several carols have been included in other recordings. Of the carols the first, usually titled "The Darkest Midnight in December", has been arranged by several composers such as Stephen Main, Kelly-Marie Murphy, Dave Flynn, James Tanguay, Mark Swinton, and William Whitehead. The carols have become part of the repertoire of Irish traditional singers, such as Paddy Berry. They have also been featured at various concerts. In December 2005, Murphy's setting of the first carol was premiered by Judy Loman and the Toronto Children's Chorus. In 2006, the Kilmore singers themselves performed the carols at Sheffield's "Festival of Village Carols". In 2011, Aoife Clancy, Robbie O'Connell, and Jimmy Keane performed a concert in Unity, Maine which included selections from the carols. Caitriona O'Leary, who had studied the carols extensively, performed them in two concerts, at Drogheda and Dublin, in 2013. She later released an album of the carols, also featuring Tom Jones, Rosanne Cash, and Rhiannon Giddens, in 2014. Main's setting of the first carol was featured in the University of Puget Sound's 2015 Winter Concert "The Darkest Midnight in December". Musical quintet Ensemble Ibérica performed selections from the carols at St. Paul's Episcopal Church in Kansas City, Missouri in 2014 and 2016. In 2019, the Esprit de Choeur women’s choir featured Murphy's setting of the first carol at their concert "The Darkest Midnight in December", held in Winnipeg, Canada.

== Songs of the cycle ==
In 1949, Fr. Joseph Ranson published the words and surviving music of the Kilmore Carols in The Past, the journal of Wexford's Uí Cinsealaigh Historical Society. An edition of the carols, with transcriptions by Seóirse Bodley, was also prepared by Diarmaid Ó Muirithe in 1982. The titles and first lines given by Ranson were as follows:

1. On Christ's Nativity (First Carol for Christmas) ("The darkest midnight in December")
2. Second Carol for Christmas Day ("Christmas day is come")
3. Third Carol for Christmas Day ("Ye sons of man with me rejoice")
4. Fourth Carol for Christ's Nativity ("An angel this night")
5. Song for St. Stephen's Day ("This is St. Stephen's day")
6. Song for St. John's Day ("To greet our Saviour's dear one")
7. Song for the Holy Innocents ("Hail ye flowers of martyrs")
8. St. Sylvester's Day ("This feast of St. Sylvester so well deserves a song")
9. Carol for New Year's Day ("Sweetest of all names, Jesus")
10. Song for New Year's Day ("The first day of the year")
11. Song for Jerusalem (First Carol for Twelfth Day) ("Jerusalem, our happy home")
12. Song for Twelfth Day (Second Carol for Twelfth Day) ("Now to conclude our Christmas mirth")
13. A Virgin Queen in Bethlehem ("A Virgin Queen in Bethlehem")

== Recordings ==
- Nóirín Ní Riain, Darkest Midnight (1982/1996)
- The Voice Squad, Many's the Foolish Youth (1987/1995)
- Anúna, ANÚNA (1993/2005)
- Waverly Consort, A Waverly Consort Christmas (1994/2006)
- Áine Minogue, To Warm the Winter's Night (1996)
- Emma Kirby with the Westminster Abbey Choir, Adeste Fideles! Christmas Down The Ages (1996)
- The Schola Cantorum of St. Peter's in the Loop, Music for the Twelve Days of Christmas (1996)
- The Pro Arte Singers and Indiana University Children’s Chamber Choir, Traditional & Modern Carols (1998/2002)
- Robbie O'Connell—Aengus, All On a Christmas Morning (1998)
- Renaissance Players, Testament: Archangels' Banquet & Shepherds' Delight (2000)
- Rodolfus Choir, A Christmas Collection (2003)
- The Priory Singers, Belfast, Let Christians All with Joyful Mirth (2005)
- Meredith Hall and La Nef, Oikan Ayns Bethlehem (2006)
- New York Polyphony, I Sing the Birth (2007)
- Robbie O'Connell, A Christmas Celtic Sojourn (2007)
- Joglaresa, In Hoary Winter's Night (2009)
- The Golden Eggs, Fireside Carols (2010)
- VocalEssence Ensemble Singers and Chorus, Behold This Heavenly Night (2010)
- The Christmas Revels, Down Through the Winters (2010)
- The Revels, Strike the Harp (2012)
- Caitríona O'Leary, The Wexford Carols (2014)
- The Choir of Liverpool Metropolitan Cathedral, O Magnum Mysterium (2014)
- Michael W. Smith, The Spirit of Christmas (2014)
- Ottawa Bach Choir, 'Twas But Pure Love (2016)
- David Arkenstone and Charlee Brooks, Winter Fantasy (2016)
- Gareth Davies-Jones, The Darkest Midnight in December (2018)
- Papagena, The Darkest Midnight (2018)
- Caitríona O'Leary, Strange Wonders (2021)
