= Luke Wadding (bishop) =

Roman Catholic priest (1628 - 1687)

Luke Wadding (1628 - 1687) was a Roman Catholic priest, Bishop, and author of Christian poetry during the Stuart Restoration.

Luke Wadding was born at Ballycogley Castle in County Wexford into a wealthy Recusant mercantile family and was descended from Ireland's Old English nobility. Following the slaying of his father during the Sack of Wexford by Oliver Cromwell's New Model Army and the confiscation of the family's property by the Commonwealth of England, Wadding fled to France and was ordained as a Roman Catholic priest after attending the Irish College in Paris and the Sorbonne.

After 17 years of living in exile, Fr. Wadding returned to Ireland with orders to rebuild the Roman Catholic Diocese of Ferns following the devastation of the Cromwellian conquest of Ireland. He continued to do so covertly despite the renewed religious persecution caused by the anti-Catholic witch hunt masterminded by Titus Oates and Lord Shaftesbury. He died shortly before the 1688 overthrow of the House of Stuart and was buried beneath the Chapel of the Franciscan Friary in Wexford Town.

Bishop Wadding also remains well known as one of the later Metaphysical poets. Two of his works of Christian poetry, heavily influenced by the works of Richard Crashaw, are still sung as part of the Wexford Carols cycle during the Twelve Days of Christmas and have also been recorded commercially. Yet another Christmas carol was collected in England by Cecil Sharp in Buckland, Gloucestershire and by Ralph Vaughan Williams in Horsham, Sussex; it is also sung to Luke Wadding's lyrics and is commonly known as the Sussex Carol.

== Early life ==
Wadding was born in his father's castle at Ballycogley, in the Yola-speaking Barony of Bargy. He was one of four children, in a family of staunchly Catholic, Royalist, and Old English descent. His father, Walter Wadding, was a successful merchant of Wexford, while his mother, Mary (née Sinnott), was the daughter of Raheen landowner David Sinnott.

Despite the Wadding family's Royalist preferences, escalating pressure was being put on Irish Catholics, and particularly on Ireland's Hiberno-Norman elite, to conform to the State-controlled Protestant Church of Ireland. After the massacres of the Old English Catholic civilians of The Pale by New English Royalist and Protestant soldiers under the command of Sir Charles Coote during the Irish Rebellion of 1641, Walter Wadding found it impossible to continuing balancing political loyalty to King Charles I with religious loyalty to the Catholic Church in Ireland. He reluctantly joined the Irish Catholic Confederation. During the later Cromwellian conquest of Ireland, Walter Wadding was killed for this very reason by Oliver Cromwell's New Model Army during the 2–11 October 1649 Sack of Wexford and all his property was declared forfeit to the Commonwealth of England under the Act of Settlement. Later that same month, Luke Wadding fled Ireland for a 17-year long exile in Catholic Europe.

According to historian D.P. Conyngham, "It is impossible to estimate the number of Catholics slain the ten years from 1642 to 1652. Three Bishops and more than 300 priests were put to death for their faith. Thousands of men, women, and children were sold as slaves for the West Indies; Sir W. Petty mentions that 6,000 boys and women were thus sold. A letter written in 1656, quoted by Lingard, puts the number at 60,000; as late as 1666 there were 12,000 Irish slaves scattered among the West Indian islands. Forty thousand Irish fled to the Continent, and 20,000 took shelter in the Hebrides or other Scottish islands. In 1641, the population of Ireland was 1,466,000, of whom 1,240,000 were Catholics. In 1659 the population was reduced to 500,091, so that very nearly 1,000,000 must have perished or been driven into exile in the space of eighteen years. In comparison with the population of both periods, this was even worse than the famine extermination of our own days."

Meanwhile, Luke Wadding entered the Irish College in Paris in 1651, where he is known to have closely followed the ongoing debates over Gallicanist and Jansenist heresies. He is also known to have been ordained to the priesthood at an unknown date and to have received a doctorate in theology from the Sorbonne in 1668.

== Rebuilding a Diocese ==
According to Diarmaid Ó Muirithe, "Ferns was without a regular Bishop between 1651 and 1684. Bishop Nicholas French had left Ireland to seek the help of the Duke of Lorraine, but because of the enmity of the Duke of Ormonde he was refused permission to return even after the restoration of Charles II. In 1668, French invited his first cousin Luke Wadding to return to Wexford to represent him as Vicar General of Ferns. He appointed him parish priest of New Ross."

Due to the sympathies of the King and his suspension of all anti-Catholic religious persecution through the Declaration of the Indulgence, there was a general relaxation and the Tridentine Mass increasingly moved from outdoor Mass rocks (Irish: Carraig an Aifrinn) to thatched "Mass houses" (Irish: Cábán an Aifrinn, lit. ‘Mass Cabin’). Writing in 1668, Janvin de Rochefort commented, "Even in Dublin more than twenty houses where Mass is secretly said, and in about a thousand places, subterranean vaults and retired spots in the woods".

At the same time, the whole Catholic Church in Ireland had been devastated and Fr. Wadding had to rebuild the Diocese from the ground up. With the assistance of Irish Jesuits Stephen Gelosse and Stephen Rice, he founded a Catholic school in New Ross for 120 young boys. After grudgingly accepting a promotion to Coadjutor Bishop of Ferns with right of succession in 1673, Wadding moved to Wexford, while indefinitely delaying his episcopal consecration with Bishop French's approval. He asked, however, to be sent from abroad a pectoral cross, a mitre, a crozier, some vestments, and everything else necessary for saying a Pontifical High Mass, "for nothing of the sort can be had here".

According to Barry Crosbie, the fact that Wadding was lodged in Wexford and protected by the highly influential Anglo-Irish and Protestant Wiseman family made it possible for him to smuggle "popular contemporary books of doctrine and devotion, catechisms, and prayerbooks", from Catholic Europe into his Diocese. Furthermore, "In an effort to encourage and increase literacy and religious devotion, he then distributed these items among his friends and relatives. One of his most difficult tasks was to establish some much needed Church structures, both physical and organisational. The existing baptismal and marriage registers for the Catholic parish of Wexford Town, begun in 1672 by Wadding, are among the earliest known documents of their kind in Ireland."

In 1674, Wadding began building a public Mass-house inside the walls of Wexford, which only his friendships with the Anglo-Irish and Protestant elite of the town allowed him to get away with. The project took him 12 years to complete and cost a total of £53.14s.9d.

According to Diarmaid Ó Muirithe, "He gives details of its glazing, ceiling, thatching, etc., in his account book, and mentions that he had to remove a great heap of dung from the site before he could lay the foundations of his little chapel. It is evident that he maintained as best he could the dignity of his office and he had a good quantity of chalices, ciboria, pixes, silver cruets, and silver and pewter oil-stocks. He had a plentiful supply of vestments."

During the show trials and anti-Catholic hysteria concocted by Titus Oates and Lord Shaftesbury, Wadding was arrested for violating the law commanding all Catholic bishops, vicars general, and regular clergy to leave Ireland by 20 November 1678. In response, Wadding explained that he not a bishop and had creased to be a vicar general following the recent death of Bishop French in Ghent. Somehow, he was able to remain in Wexford and avoid deportation.

== Bishop ==
According to Diarmaid Ó Muirithe, "In 1683 he seems to have been asked by the Congregation of Propaganda to explain why he still had not been consecrated Bishop of his Diocese. He explained that the conditions in Wexford Town were atrocious: he alone was responsible for ministering a Catholic population reduced by Cromwell's Army from 2,000 to 400. Nevertheless, the Congregation directed him not to delay his consecration any longer and he was finally consecrated Bishop in 1683 or early in 1684." The location of the ceremony as well as the names of Bishop Wadding's consecrators, however, remains unknown.

In 1684 Bishop Luke Wadding published a poetry book in Ghent that still influences the people of his Diocese, as well as people far beyond its borders. The book bore the title, A Smale Garland of Pious and Godly Songs. Compos'd by a Devout Man For the Solace of his Friends Neighbours in the Afflictions. The Sweet and the Sower, The Nettle and the Flower, The Thorne and the Rose, This Garland Compose.

According to Ó Muirithe, "It contained some religious 'posies', some written for the disinherited gentry of County Wexford, and some verses relating to the Popish Plot. It also contained what was to become the foundation of a tradition of Carol singing in the County, eleven Christmas songs, two of which are sung to this day in the village of Kilmore."

In March 1685, Bishop Wadding was awarded a pension of £150 a year by King James II, which further aided the struggling finances of his impoverished Diocese.

== Death and legacy ==
According to family records, Bishop Luke Wadding died in December 1687 and was buried beneath the aisle and just outside the sanctuary of the Franciscan Friary in Wexford Town.

Following his death, the roof of Bishop Wadding's thatched Mass-house fell in and his successor was forbidden to repair or rebuild it. For many years afterwards, the Bishops of Ferns had to use the Franciscan Friary in Wexford as their Pro-Cathedral.

According to Diarmaid Ó Muirithe, "He left his excellent library in his will to the priests of Ross and Wexford. It contained theological tracts by Gregory the Great, Aquinas, Baronius, and Bellarmine, and many books of poetry. Dryden was represented, and so were George Herbert, John Donne, and Richard Crashaw. As the reader will notice, the Metaphysical poets had an influence on Wadding. It is impossible to be reminded of Crashaw's conceit of 'Aeternity shut in a span' when we read Wadding's 'Heaven's great treasures are now but small/ Immensity no extent at all.' This conceit he developed further in his long carol for Christ's Nativity: 'Now infinite height is low, and infinite depth is shallow / The greatest lemgth is short, the greatest largeness narrow.' Luke Wadding's Carols became very popular, and the Smale Garland was reprinted in London in 1728 and 1731 for a James Connor, a Drogheda bookseller."

Three of Bishop Wadding's Carols were later included in Fr. William Devereux's 18th-century manuscript A New Garland Containing Songs for Christmas. The Wexford Carols, as they are now called, are traditionally sung during the Twelve Days of Christmas by a choir of six men, who first divide into two groups of three to sing alternating verses. In a January 1872 letter to the Wexford newspaper The Nation, a local man recalled, "I have stood within many of the grandest Cathedrals of Europe and under the Dome of St. Peter's itself, but in none of them did I ever feel the soul-thrilling rapturous sensation that I did as a boy listening to six aged men on a frosty Christmas morning sing the carols beneath the low straw-thatched chapel of Rathangan."

According to Barry Crosbie, "Perhaps what is so significant about his life was the fact that his tenure is representative of a Catholic bishop in Seventeenth-century Ireland whose loyalty to the Crown was as important as his religious obligations to the Papacy. Taking enormous pride in his Old English Catholic heritage and links to the Crown, he was not afraid to voice his discontent with Rome while acting in the best interests of his people. Most importantly, however, Luke Wadding was a man of exceptional charity, an indefatigable pastor, a zealous and prudent Bishop, and an engaging human being."

Since the Wexford carols have become more widely known, they have been performed and recorded commercially by Nóirín Ní Riain, Allison Krause, Waverly Consort, Zoë Conway, and many other musicians.

== Publications ==
- A Smale Garland of Pious and Godly Songs. Compos'd by the Reverend Father Luke Waddinge Bishop of Ferns which he Compos'd for the Solace of his friends and neighbours in their afflictions, Ghent, 1684.
