= Richard Purcell (architect) =

Irish architect

- Born: County Wexford, Ireland
- Died: County Wexford, Ireland
- Occupations: Architect, Builder
- Known for: Architect of country houses

Richard Purcell was an Irish architect and builder active in mid-nineteenth-century County Wexford, in the southeast of Ireland. He was associated with the Day family of architects, which included Martin Day, William Day, John Day.
