= Martin Day =

Martin Day may refer to:

- Martin Day (writer), British screenwriter and novelist
- Martin Day (fighter), Japanese-born American mixed martial artist
- Martin Day (architect), Irish architect and builder

== See also ==
- Martin's Day, a 1985 American drama film
- Martyn Day (disambiguation)
