= Nóirín =

Nóirín is an Irish given name. Notable people with the name include:

- Nóirín Ní Riain (born 1951), Irish singer, writer, teacher, and theologian
- Nóirín O'Sullivan
- Nóirín Kelly, a contestant on Big Brother (British series 10)
