= Owen and Moley =

- Owen and Moley in 2008

Background information
- Origin: Limerick, Ireland
- Genres: Pop; Folk; Rock; Irish Traditional
- Years active: 2007–present
- Label: eyemusic (own label)
- Website: Official website

Owen Ó Súilleabháin and Moley Ó Súilleabháin are musicians from Limerick, Ireland.

Originally known as size2shoes, they released their debut album, size2shoes in December 2008 which led to featured performances on national television and radio in both Ireland and the United States. They have also performed alongside The Chieftains, Bobby McFerrin, and Sinéad O'Connor. Since 2013, Owen and Moley no longer perform under the name Size2shoes and now perform under their own names.

== Background ==
Brothers Owen and Moley Ó Súilleabháin were brought up in a musical household. Their parents, singer Nóirín Ní Riain and composer and pianist Mícheál Ó Súilleabháin, taught the duo from an early age to respect music. They began to record professionally in 2007, collaborating with their mother on the Amen album, later released as Celtic Joy in the United States of America. The duo have recorded with Grammy Award-winning singer Moya Brennan.

=== Owen Ó Súilleabháin ===
Owen (born Eoin) Ó Súilleabháin, the eldest of the brothers first recorded professionally alongside Sinéad O'Connor, Nóirín Ní Riain, poet John O'Donohue, and the Monks of Glenstal Abbey on the album Biscantorat in 2003. In 2005 he became the director of the Sionna Festival, a large festival based in the University of Limerick.

Owen Ó Súilleabháin earned a degree in Philosophy at University College Dublin and a master's degree in Peace Studies at the University of Limerick. In 2005, he became Orchestral Manager for the World Youth Orchestra in Rome and toured with them through Jerusalem, Ramallah, Jordan and Amman for both Israeli and Palestinian audiences. Owen taught English as a foreign language to refugees at the Adult Education College in Limerick city from 2002 to 2012.

=== Moley Ó Súilleabháin ===
Moley (Mícheál Pádraig) Ó Súilleabháin earned an M.A. in Ethnomusicology at the University of Limerick and studied rap music and the rap culture in County Cork, Ireland.

He sang and played bodhrán with The Chieftains at Belfast Festival at Queens in 2007 and is an expert in beatbox techniques, which introduced him to Bobby McFerrin with whom he has recorded.

== History ==
=== 2007–2009: Beginnings and first album ===
Although the duo had been writing songs for a number of years, they did not begin recording together until 2007. In 2008 they finished recording their debut self-titled album, size2shoes, recorded by Kevin Lynch (U2, Elvis Costello) which garnered strong reviews from The Edinburgh Fringe Festival and Irish media. The album had size2shoes featured on national media, which prompted them to begin writing more material.

The duo received popular acclaim from Irish media, being compared to Scullion and Sonny Condell. A live performance in Dublin in October 2008, which invited Julie Feeney as a guest singer, drew comparisons with "Simon & Garfunkel and Steely Dan unplugged".

In September 2009 the duo performed at Electric Picnic. Their début album, with single "Sitting by the Sea", was officially launched at Crawdaddy in Dublin, and they supported Hothouse Flowers the same month.

=== 2009–2012: Second album ===
Size2shoes announced they were recording their second album and have performed songs from the record in both the National Concert Hall and Spin FM in early 2009, and indicated that they would be recording part of the album in Australia at the recording studio of Russell Crowe. The album Happy Songs was released in 2011.

Size2shoes had cameo parts in Steven Spielberg's 2011 film War Horse and on its soundtrack, but their scenes were cut from the eventual release.

=== 2012–present: Current work ===
Since 2013, Owen and Moley have focused on performing all of the songs that they inherited from their parents along with their own original music. In 2019 they recorded an hour long special for PBS that was aired on Season 4 Episode 2 of The Kate.

== Discography ==
=== Albums ===
- 2003 — Biscantorat (with Noirín Ní Riain, Sinéad O'Connor and The Monks of Glenstal Abbey)
- 2007 — Amen (with Nóirín Ní Riain)
- 2008 — Celtic Joy (with Nóirín Ní Riain)
- 2009 — size2shoes (re-released in 2019 as Light in the Dark)
- 2011 — Happy Songs
- 2013 — Filleadh: Sacred Songs
- 2015 — Hearth Sounds - Ancient Songs from Ireland and the World (with Nóirín Ní Riain)
- 2016 — Fields of Grace: Celtic Meditation Music from the Heart of Ireland
- 2019 — You Bring Me Beautiful

=== Singles ===
- 2009 – Sitting by the Sea ("Sittin' by the Sea (with You)" on album)

=== Appearances ===
- 2008 – Sanctuary (various artists)

== Filmography ==
- 2011 – War Horse
