= Rathangan =

Rathangan may refer to:

- Rathangan, County Kildare
- Rathangan, County Wexford
