= Wexford Carol =

Irish Christmas carol

- Genre: Christmas carol
- Meter: 8.8.8.8 (long metre)
- Melody: Traditional Irish folk melody, transcribed by W. H. Grattan Flood

The Wexford Carol (Roud 22086) or the Enniscorthy Carol (Irish: Carúl Loch Garman, Carúl Inis Córthaidh) is a traditional Irish Christmas carol originating from Enniscorthy in County Wexford. The subject of the song is the nativity of Jesus Christ.

== Grattan Flood transcription ==
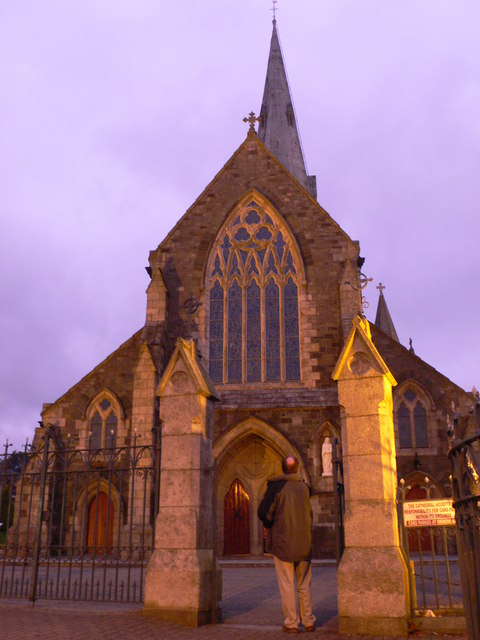
St. Aidan's Cathedral

"The Wexford Carol", sometimes known by its first verse "Good people all this Christmas time", is of uncertain origins, and, while it is occasionally claimed to be from the early Middle Ages, it likely was composed in the 15th or 16th century based on its musical and lyrical style. The song achieved a renewed popularity due to the work of William Grattan Flood (1859–1928), who was organist and musical director at St. Aidan's Cathedral in Enniscorthy. He transcribed the carol from the performance of a local singer and had it published in The Oxford Book of Carols, after which it was included in other carol books as well.

== English lyrics ==
1. Good people all, this Christmas time,
Consider well and bear in mind
What our good God for us has done
In sending His beloved Son
With Mary holy we should pray,
To God with love this Christmas Day
In Bethlehem upon that morn,
There was a blessed Messiah born.

2. The night before that happy tide,
The noble virgin and her guide
Were long time seeking up and down
To find a lodging in the town.
But mark how all things came to pass
From every door repelled, alas,
As was foretold, their refuge all
Was but a humble ox's stall.

3. Near Bethlehem did shepherds keep
Their flocks of lambs and feeding sheep
To whom God's angels did appear
Which put the shepherds in great fear
Prepare and go, the angels said
To Bethlehem, be not afraid
For there you'll find, this happy morn
A princely Babe, sweet Jesus, born.

4. With thankful heart and joyful mind
The shepherds went the babe to find
And as God's angel had foretold
They did our Saviour Christ behold
Within a manger He was laid
And by his side the virgin maid
Attending on the Lord of Life
Who came on earth to end all strife.

5. There were three wise men from afar
Directed by a glorious star
And on they wandered night and day
Until they came where Jesus lay
And when they came unto that place
Where our beloved Messiah lay
They humbly cast them at His feet
With gifts of gold and incense sweet.

== Irish lyrics ==
1. Ó, tagaig' uile is adhraigí
An leanbh cneasta sa chró 'na luí
Is cuimhnígí ar ghrá an Rí
A thug dár saoradh anocht an Naí.
'S a Mhuire Mháthair i bParrthas Dé,
Ar chlann bhocht Éabha guich 'nois go caomh,
Is doras an chró ná dún go deo
Go n-adhram' feasta Mac Mhuire Ógh.

2. I mBeithil thoir i lár na hoích'
Ba chlos an deascéala d'aoirí,
Go follas don saol ón spéir go binn
Bhí aingle 'canadh ó rinn go rinn.
"Gluaisig' go beo," dúirt Aingeal Dé,
"Go Beithil sall is gheobhaidh sibh É
'Na luí go séimh i mainséar féir,
Siúd É an Meisias a ghráigh an saol."

== Melody ==
Source

== Modern performance ==
Traditions abound concerning the song – for example, that only men should sing it. However, many popular female artists, such as Julie Andrews in 1966 and Loreena McKennitt in 1987, have recorded versions of it, the former including an additional verse beginning "And buckets yore did rain that night."

- Nanci Griffith recorded the song for The Chieftains' 1989 album A Chieftains Celebration. The recording also appears on their 1991 holiday album The Bells of Dublin.
- The Irish Tenors performed their version as the third track on their 1999 Christmas album Home For Christmas.
- In 2002 John Rutter recorded his arrangement with the Cambridge Singers featuring baritone Stephen Varcoe.
- The Irish singing group Celtic Woman included the Wexford Carol on their 2006 Christmas album A Christmas Celebration and 2019 album The Magic of Christmas.
- Yo-Yo Ma and Alison Krauss recorded the song for Ma's 2008 holiday album, Songs of Joy & Peace.
- Anthony Kearns (The Irish Tenors) performs it annually and has featured on TV across the USA at Christmas.
- Michael McDonald covered it on his 2009 album This Christmas as a duet with his wife Amy Holland, using only the first three of the traditional verses.
- The English boys' choir Libera performed an arrangement of the carol on their 2013 album, Angels Sing: Christmas in Ireland, recorded at Armagh Cathedral.
- Country artist Trace Adkins recorded a version of the hymn on his 2013 Christmas album The King's Gift.
- The carol featured as title track on the 2014 collection of traditional Irish Carols The Wexford Carols by the Irish early-music singer Caitríona O'Leary, with Tom Jones and Rosanne Cash.
- Irish folksinger Cara Dillon featured the song on her 2016 album Upon a Winter's Night.
- The Mormon Tabernacle Choir performed an arrangement by conductor Mack Wilberg on its 2016 album Hallelujah!.
- On 28 November 2017, it was performed by flautist Ashley Snell in Leonard Auditorium at Wofford College.
- In the fall of 2018, Daywind Records in Nashville, Tennessee, released A Winter Carol by the Gospel Music Association's Hall of Fame family, The Nelons. It features The Wexford Carol as the second track on the album.
- A duet cover of the song is featured in the international/US version of Murdoch Mysteries season 18 episode 7, "The Measure of My Dreams".

== See also ==
- List of Christmas carols
