= ZFKV-FM =

George Town, Cayman Islands; Cayman Islands
- Broadcast area: Grand Cayman, Cayman Islands
- Frequency: 98.9 MHz
- Branding: Vibe FM

Programming
- Format: Reggae/Pop

Ownership
- Owner: Paramount Media Services
- Sister stations: Spin FM

History
- First air date: 30 November 2001

Technical information
- Transmitter coordinates: 19°18′N 81°23′W
- Repeater: ZFKV-FM-1 98.9 Cayman Brac

Links
- Webcast: Listen Live
- Website: Official website

Vibe FM (98.9 FM) is a radio station in the Cayman Islands. The station is owned by Paramount Media Services and airs an Urban Caribbean music format featuring reggae and pop music as well as specialty programs featuring jazz celeb news, pop music and Gospel music. Showbiz Journalist Mark Boardman regularly talks entertainment news on the show which goes out nationwide.

The station's most recent license was issued on 11 December 2003. At some point in 2018, the station was re-branded from Vibe FM to IRIE FM, and by December 2021, ISLAND FM.
