= The Wexford Carols =

Studio album by Caitríona O'Leary
- Released: 17 November 2014
- Recorded: 21–25 July 2014 Westmeath
- Genre: Christmas
- Producer: Joe Henry

The Wexford Carols is a 2014 album of traditional Irish carols by Caitríona O'Leary featuring guest singers Tom Jones, Rosanne Cash and Carolina Chocolate Drops singer Rhiannon Giddens produced by Joe Henry. The carol texts are mainly taken from the Christian poetry composed during the three century long religious persecution of the Catholic Church in Ireland by Bishop Luke Wadding (1684), who was heavily under the influence of the Metaphysical poets, and Father William Devereux (1728). In the case of Fr. Devereux's carols, the tunes were not indicated, so O'Leary matched surviving folk tunes fitting the poems. The song "The Darkest Midnight" was learned from the 1982 album Darkest Midnight by singer Nóirín Ní Riain and the monks of Glenstal Abbey. The album went to No.1 on the Billboard World Albums Chart.

== Track listing ==
1. "Tell Shepherds" – Caitríona O’Leary
2. "An Angel This Night" – Caitríona O’Leary
3. "Jerusalem Our Happy Home" – Tom Jones (backing vocals Caitríona O’Leary & Rhiannon Giddens)
4. "This Is Our Christmass Day" – Caitríona O’Leary
5. "Now To Conclude Our Christmas Mirth" – Rhiannon Giddens (backing vocals Tom Jones & Caitríona O’Leary)
6. "The Darkest Midnight In December" – Caitríona O’Leary
7. "An Angel This Bright Midnight" – Rosanne Cash, Caitríona O’Leary, John Smith, Graham Hopkins
8. "Behould Three Kings" – Rosanne Cash (backing vocals O’Leary, John Smith, Graham Hopkins)
9. "The Angell Said To Joseph Mild" – Tom Jones (backing vocals O’Leary, Cash, Giddens)
10. "A Virgin Queen In Bethlehem" – Caitríona O’Leary, Singer
11. "Christmas Day Is Come" – Rhiannon Giddens & Caitríona O’Leary, Vocals
12. "The Enniscorthy Christmas Carol" – Rosanne Cash, Rhiannon Giddens, Caitríona O’Leary, Tom Jones
