= Paraty (record label) =

Paraty is a record label founded in 2007 by Brazilian harpsichordist Bruno Procopio.

Although originally created to allow Procopio to complete his survey of Johann Sebastian Bach's keyboard Partitas, BWV 825-830, the scope of the label has recently been expanded. The label is now actively supporting two other young instrumentalists based in France, pianists Nicolas Stavy and Ivan Ilić.

Paraty's releases include:

- JS Bach Partitas 5, 2 and 6 by Bruno Procopio, harpsichord (2007)
- Frédéric Chopin A Chopin recital (Sonata in B Minor opus 58, Polonaise-Fantasy, etc) by Nicolas Stavy, piano (2007)
- JS Bach Sonatas for viola da gamba and harpsichord by Emmanuelle Guigues and Bruno Procopio (2008)
- Claude Debussy Préludes for piano, Books 1 and 2 by Ivan Ilić, piano (2008)

Paraty's recordings have already enjoyed considerable critical success in the French press. Awards garnered by Paraty include Le Monde de la Musique's 'Choc' award, Mezzo TV's Critics Choice award, 4/5 stars from Diapason Magazine, and a 9/10 from Classica Magazine.

Paraty is distributed in France by Intégral Distribution; its recordings are also available commercially in Germany, Belgium, Luxembourg, Switzerland, the British Isles, Spain, Italy, Denmark, the Czech Republic, South Korea, Japan, and New Zealand.
