= Ivan Ilić (pianist) =

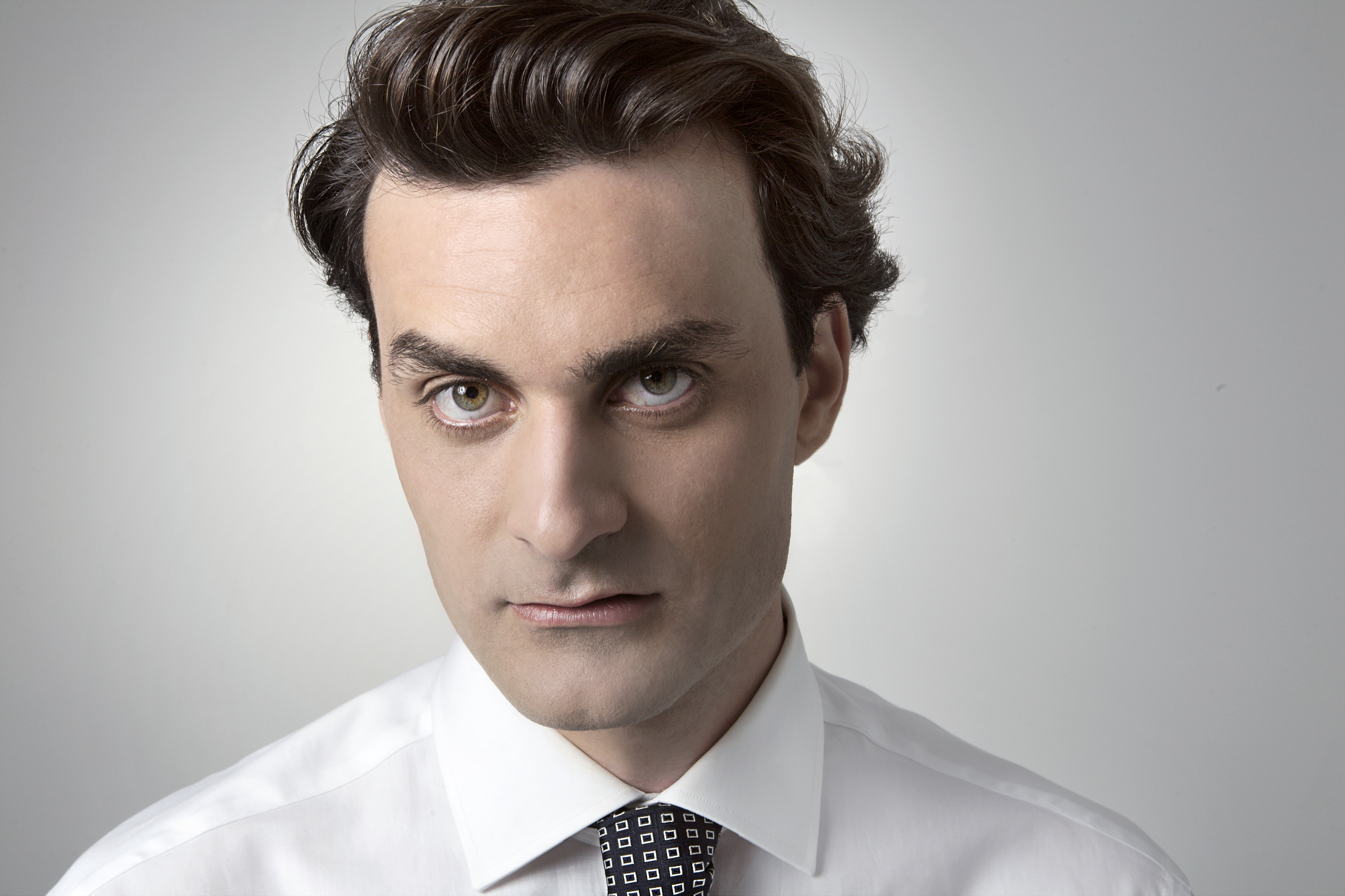

Background information
- Born: August 14, 1978 (age 48); Palo Alto
- Genre: Classical
- Occupation: Pianist
- Website: www.ivancdg.com

Ivan Ilić (Serbian Cyrillic: Иван Илић; born August 14, 1978) is a Serbian-American pianist. He lives in Paris.

== Early life ==
Ilić was born in Palo Alto, in the United States. He attended the University of California, Berkeley in the U.S. where he took degrees in mathematics and music. Ilić also briefly studied at the San Francisco Conservatory of Music before pursuing graduate studies at the Conservatoire de Paris, earning a Premier Prix, and finally at the École Normale de Musique de Paris. His teachers in France included François-René Duchâble, Christian Ivaldi, and Jacques Rouvier.

== Career ==
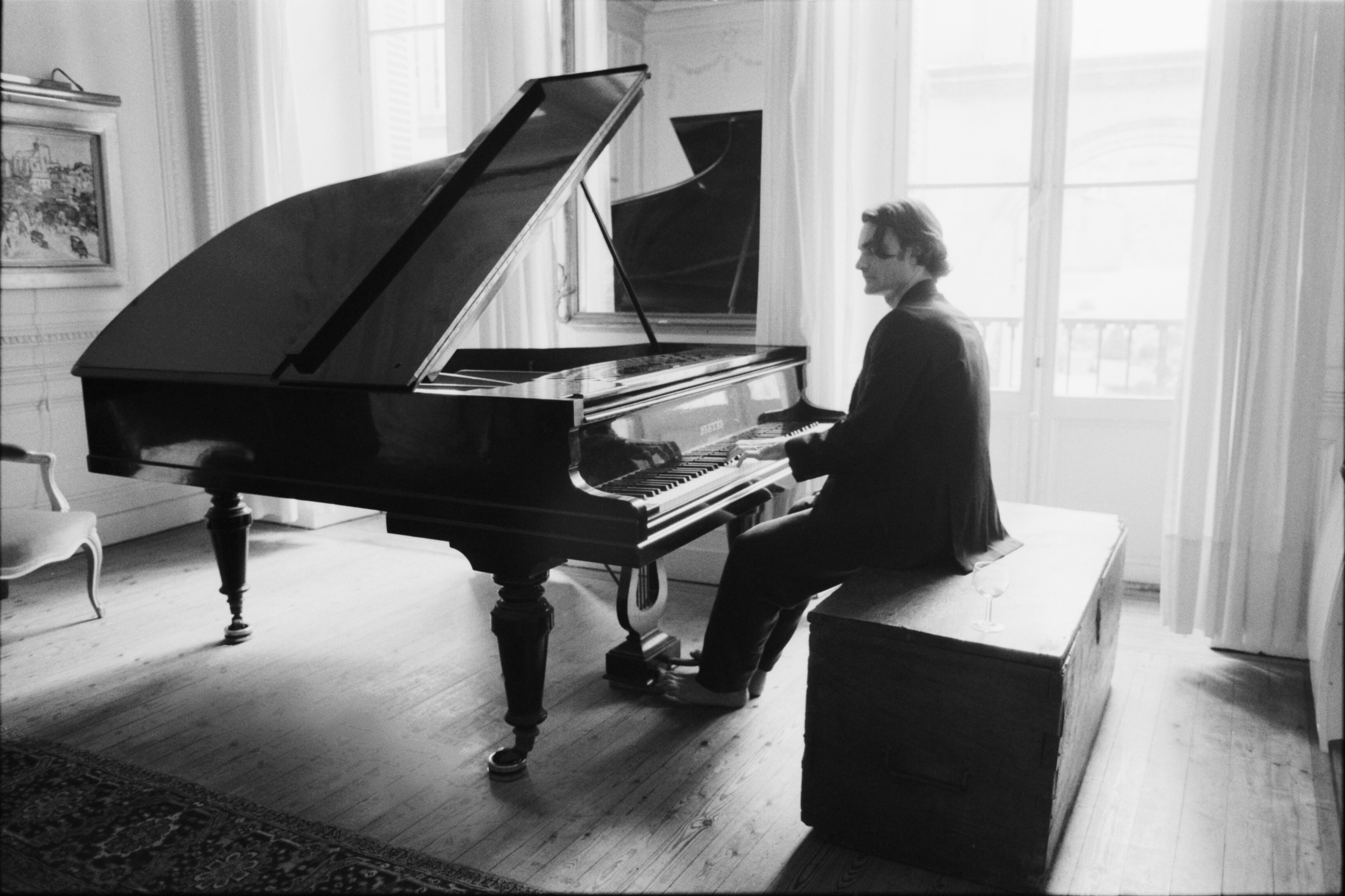
Ilić at home in France

La cathédrale engloutie, Claude Debussy

Ilić performs primarily as a soloist. His recording of Debussy's 24 Préludes was released in October 2008 on the French record label Paraty and won Mezzo TV's Critics' Choice Award in France. The disc was also a Top Five CD of the year by a critic at Fanfare Magazine and a Top Five CD of the Month by the French website Classique News. Ilić rearranged the order of the Préludes on the album, a controversial choice which he defended in several interviews.

Ilić's next album was dedicated to the left-hand Studies on Chopin's Études by Leopold Godowsky. The disc was the Classical CD of the Week of The Daily Telegraph, a Top 5 CD of Mitteldeutscher Rundfunk Figaro, and a Top 5 CD of Classique News.

Ilić has performed at Carnegie Hall, Weill Hall in New York, Wigmore Hall, Glenn Gould Studio, and Ireland's National Concert Hall.

== Discography ==
- Ivan Ilić, pianiste - oeuvres de Brahms, Beethoven et Chopin, Mairie de Paris
- Elegance and Refinement - Baroque Suites, French Sweets, Magnatune
- Fugitive Visions - Piano Masterworks by Chopin and Liszt, Magnatune
- Romantic - Powerful Miniatures by Schumann and Brahms, Magnatune
- Vitality and Virtuosity - Sonatas by Haydn and Beethoven, Magnatune
- Transcendental - Transcriptions by Brahms and Godowsky, Magnatune
- Claude Debussy - Préludes pour piano, Livres 1 et 2, Paraty
- Leopold Godowsky - 22 Chopin Studies, Paraty
- The Transcendentalist - Works by Scriabin, Feldman, Cage, and Wollschleger, Heresy Records
- Ivan Ilić plays Morton Feldman - For Bunita Marcus, Paraty
- Reicha Rediscovered, Volume 1 - Works by Antoine Reicha, Chandos Records
- Reicha Rediscovered, Volume 2 - Works by Antoine Reicha, Chandos Records
- Ivan Ilić plays Haydn - Symphonies transcribed by Carl David Stegmann, Chandos Records
- Reicha Rediscovered, Volume 3 - Works by Antoine Reicha, Chandos Records

== Acting ==
In 2010 Ilić acted in Luc Plissonneau's short film, Izak's Choice.
