= The Kate =

United States live music television series

- Developed by: Jennifer Boyd
- Country of origin: United States
- Original language: English
- No. of seasons: 4
- No. of episodes: 24

Production
- Executive producer: Jennifer Boyd
- Running time: 60 minutes
- Production company: CPTV

Original release
- Network: PBS
- Release: March 19, 2016 – present

The Kate is an American public television music program recorded live at the Katharine Hepburn Cultural Arts Center in Old Saybrook, Connecticut. It is produced by Public Broadcasting Service (PBS) member television station CPTV and is broadcast on PBS stations across the United States.

== Concept ==
The Kate features musical performances filmed live at the 250-seat Katharine Hepburn Cultural Arts Center. The show features performers who perform a range of musical genres, including rock, pop, blues, jazz, and Broadway.

The show's co-creator and executive producer Jennifer Boyd looks for performers who are exploring new creative directions in their work. For example, the first season included performances from former Saturday Night Live cast member Ana Gasteyer who performed a nightclub act; Ann Wilson of Heart who explored a personal project called "The Ann Wilson Thing"; actress Rita Wilson who performed songs from an upcoming album; and Jarrod Spector whose performance traced the history of the falsetto from Enrico Caruso to Freddie Mercury.

Each season consists of six one-hour episodes. In addition to the musical performances, each episode features interviews with the performers and backstage footage.

A fifth season is in production and is scheduled to run in the spring of 2020. Guests in the 2020 season will include Delbert McClinton and The Wood Brothers.

== Episodes ==
Season	Episodes	Originally released	
Season	Episodes	First released	Last released
1	6	March 19, 2016	April 23, 2016
2	6	April 7, 2017	May 12, 2017
3	6	April 7, 2018	May 12, 2018
4	6	May 10, 2019	June 14, 2019

=== Season 1 ===
No. overall	No. in season	Title	Original release date
1	1	"Ana Gasteyer"	March 19, 2016
2	2	"Rickie Lee Jones"	March 26, 2016
3	3	"Jarrod Spector"	April 2, 2016
4	4	"Ann Wilson"	April 9, 2016
5	5	"Barb Jungr"	April 16, 2016
6	6	"Rita Wilson"	April 23, 2016

=== Season 2 ===
No. overall	No. in season	Title	Original release date
7	1	"Jane Lynch"	April 7, 2017
8	2	"Darlene Love"	April 14, 2017
9	3	"Kiefer Sutherland"	April 21, 2017
10	4	"Mary Lambert"	April 28, 2017
11	5	"Maurice Hines"	May 5, 2017
12	6	"Rosanne Cash"	May 12, 2017

=== Season 3 ===
No. overall	No. in season	Title	Original release date
13	1	"Nancy and Beth"	April 7, 2018
14	2	"Marc Broussard"	April 14, 2018
15	3	"Black Violin"	April 21, 2018
16	4	"Jarrod Spector and Kelli Barrett"	April 28, 2018
17	5	"Jimmy Webb with Special Guest Ashley Campbell"	May 5, 2018
18	6	"John Oates"	May 12, 2018

=== Season 4 ===
No. overall	No. in season	Title	Original release date
19	1	"Sheila E."	May 10, 2019
20	2	"Owen & Moley Ó Súilleabháin"	May 17, 2019
21	3	"Marc Cohn and Blind Boys of Alabama"	May 24, 2019
22	4	"Desmond Child"	May 31, 2019
23	5	"Gina Chavez"	June 7, 2019
24	6	"JJ Grey & Mofro"	June 14, 2019
