= Luc Plissonneau =

French screenwriter and film director (born 1961)

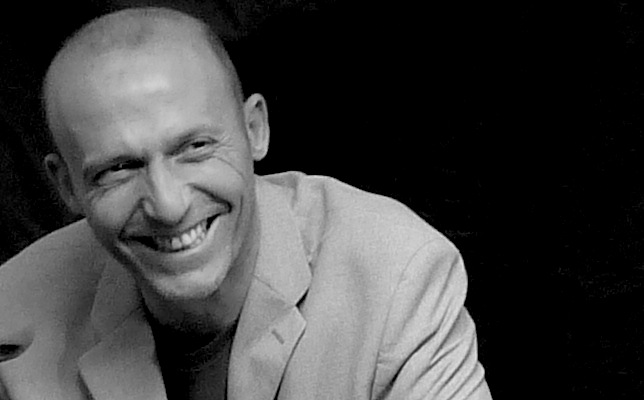
- Born: Luc Plissonneau-Duquene; September 21, 1961 (age 64); Bordeaux, France
- Writing career
- Notable works: Fil Rouge; Angela est partie Les Mains

Luc Plissonneau (born September 21, 1961) is a French screenwriter and film director. He is best known for writing and directing the short films Fil Rouge, Angela est partie, and Les Mains.

== Biography ==
Luc Plissonneau was born in Bordeaux, France, where he attended the Sainte Marie Grand Lebrun School before studying law at the Université de Bordeaux 4. During his studies he presented his first exhibition as a visual artist, A comme femme, which divulged his nascent interest in European comic strips.

While pursuing a career in wine sales and marketing in the Bordeaux wine region, he published several Fanzine comic strips. A growing interest in multi-media art led to the development of Ring, an educational video game. He then began a stint as co-writer for Vivaluz, a digital screenwriting company.

His first narrative short film, Angela est partie (Angela Is Leaving, 2003, 5 min, French) is a contemporary exploration of timeless domestic friction. Plissonneau's next short film, Fil Rouge (The Red Thread, 2008, 17 min, French w/English subtitles) is a story about an aging wine producer in Bordeaux, his family and its dark secrets. Through memories brought on by the aromas and tastes of four wines tasted blind, he will finally find peace of mind and spirit. Fil Rouge recently won first prize for both jury and audience at the Short Film Festival 'Images et Culture en Lussacais', and was also selected to compete in the Hérault du Cinéma Festival in Cap d'Agde in 2011.

His third short film, Les Mains (Izak's Choice, 2011, non-released, 17 min, French w/English subtitles) features Serbian-American pianist Ivan Ilić The story is about piano soloist, talented yet embittered by a string of failures, living off piano lessons. His intimate relationship with a young student helps him win his first audition for a major concert. The young woman has a terrible accident, leaving Izak the opportunity to change the rules. The film, due for release in summer 2012, includes the music of Leopold Godowsky and Claude Debussy. Plissonneau has completed the script for his next short film, Carlotta, mon amour, and is currently working on his first feature-length script.

== Filmography ==
- Angela est partie (2003) – screenwriter, director and producer
- Fil Rouge (2008) – screenwriter, director and co-producer
- Les Mains (2011, non-released) – screenwriter, director and co-producer
