= Mícheál Ó Súilleabháin =

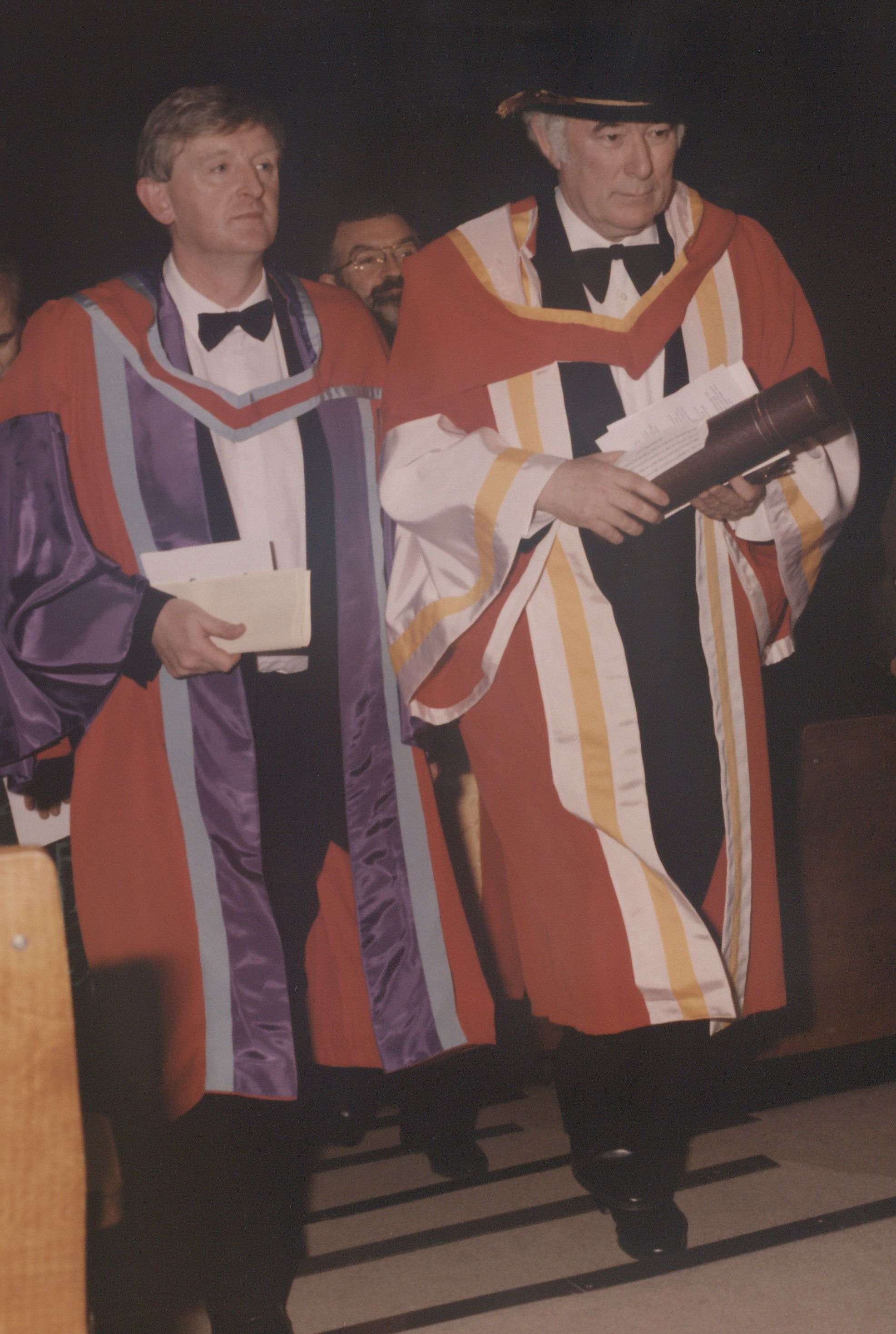
- Ó Súilleabháin (left) at the honorary conferring of Seamus Heaney (right) at the University of Limerick, 1996

Background information
- Born: 10 December 1950; Clonmel, Ireland
- Died: 7 November 2018 (aged 67)
- Genres: Classical; Irish traditional Folk
- Occupations: Composer; Pianist
- Years active: 1976–2018
- Labels: Gael Linn, Venture Records, Virgin Records, Universal Records, Sony BMG, Atlantic Records
- Website: Official site

Mícheál Ó Súilleabháin (Irish pronunciation: [ˈmʲiːçaːl̪ˠ oː ˈsˠuːl̠ʲəwaːnʲ]; 10 December 1950 – 7 November 2018) was an Irish musician, composer, academic and educationalist.

== Biography ==
Mícheál Ó Súilleabháin was a pianist, composer, recording artist and academic; he held the Professorship of Music at the Irish World Academy of Music and Dance which he founded at the University of Limerick in 1994.

Two of his three sons Owen Ó Súílleabháin and Mícheál 'Moley' Ó Súílleabháin are well known as singer songwriters and motivational speakers and perform in the Irish pop band Size2shoes. His first wife is Irish chant singer Nóirín Ní Riain, with whom he collaborated in the 1980s on a series of recordings with the Benedictine Monks of Glenstal Abbey.

In a 1995 interview with In Dublin magazine (Vol 20, No 20) he told Damian Corless that he was born into a Clonmel home where "there was no music of any sort. There was a windy-up gramophone and a wireless that came on at lunchtime." At University College Cork he studied under the legendary Sean Ó Riada, who was in rapidly declining health. Ó Súilleabháin attested that his mentor was "suffering a certain amount". But Ó Riada's liberating approach to traditional music left an indelible mark on his pupil, who revealed that he turned his musical limitations into strengths, telling Corless: "I said to myself 'here am I stuck with the wrong instruments for this music that I love. I don't play the pipes or the whistle. I can play the odd tune, but no matter how long I stick with them I'll never master them. I'll always be a piano player.'"

He was awarded an honorary D.Mus from the National University of Ireland at his alma mater University College Cork in 2004. In 2016, he was awarded the Freedom of the Town in his native Clonmel in Co Tipperary. In 2017, he was awarded an honorary DMus from the Royal Scottish Conservatoire.

In 1990 he founded the Irish Music Archive at the Burns Library, Boston College. In 2016 he was awarded the O'Donnell Chair of Irish Studies at the University of Notre Dame, Indiana. In 2017, he commenced a series of concerts with the RTE Symphony Orchestra (Ireland) at the National Concert Hall, Dublin, recorded and broadcast by RTE lyric fm (Elver Gleams 2017; Between Worlds 2018).

He was inaugural Chair of 'Culture Ireland' for nine years, the organisation within the Irish Government for the promotion of all Irish arts worldwide. In 2016, he retired from the University of Limerick and was succeeded following international competition by Professor Mel Mercier, Chair of Performing Arts, a long-time musical collaborator.

Working closely with Professor Helen Phelan, his second wife, between 1994 and 2016, he established the Irish World Academy. The institute offers around 20 postgraduate and undergraduate degree programmes, such as Music Therapy, Contemporary Dance Performance, Irish Traditional Dance Performance, Community Music, Festive Arts, Irish Traditional Music Performance, Classical String Performance, Ethnomusicology, Ethnochoreology, and Ritual Chant and Song.

In 1995 he was central to the relocation and professionalisation of the Irish Chamber Orchestra from their Dublin Base to the Irish World Academy on the University of Limerick campus. In 2014, he established the aerial dance company Fidget Feet as Artists in Residence at the Academy, which led to them relocating permanently to Limerick City. In 2008, a specially designed building costing 21 million euros and comprising 3000 square meters was opened on the University of Limerick Campus to house the Irish World Academy.

He died in 2018, as the result of a lengthy illness.

== Discography ==
- Mícheál Ó Súilleabháin, 1976, Gael-Linn.
- Oró Damhnaigh, 1976, Gael Linn
- Cry of the Mountain, 1982, Gael Linn
- The Dolphin’s Way, 1987, Virgin Records Ltd.
- Oilean/Island (1989)
- Enlightenment with Van Morrison (1990)
- Casadh/Turning (1991)
- Gaiseadh/Flowing (1992)
- Between Worlds (1995)
- Lumen (1995)
- Becoming (1998)
- Templum (2001)
- Irish Destiny (DVD 2004)
- Elver Gleams (2010)
- Cry of the Mountain (2013)

Preceded by Riverdance	Eurovision Song Contest; Final Interval act 1995	Succeeded by Nils Gaup & Runar Borge
