= Size2shoes (album) =

size2shoes

Studio album by size2shoes
- Released: 2009
- Recorded: 2008–2009
- Genre: Pop; Easy listening Folk; Celtic
- Length: 33:38
- Label: eyemusic (own label)
- Producer: Eye Music & size2shoes

Singles from size2shoes
- 1. "Sitting by the Sea" Released: October 2009

Professional ratings
Review scores
Source	Rating
Irish Times	4/5 stars
Hot Press	favourable

size2shoes is the début music album by Irish band size2shoes. The album was recorded and mixed by Smalltone artist Kieran Lynch (U2, Elvis Costello, Declan O'Rourke, Iarla Ó Lionáird), and was recorded at Dromore Studios in County Tipperary in Ireland. The album was also mastered at the Windmill Lane studios in Dublin.

== Track listing ==
1. Take It Easy
2. Sitting by the Sea
3. Respect The Man
4. Mirage
5. Light In The Dark
6. Size2shoes
7. Sleeptight
8. Snooze
9. Proud
10. The Parting Glass

== Personnel ==
- Produced by eyemusic and size2shoes
- Recorded by Kevin Lynch
- Mastered by Tim Martin at Windmill Lane
- size2shoes - Vocals, Guitars, Piano
- Double Bass/Electric Bass - David Duffy
- Alto sax/clarinet - Kenneth Edge
- Harmonica - Brendan Power
- Percussion - Noel Eccles
- Strings Quartet - The Carolan String Quartet
  - Lynda O'Connor (violin)
  - Aoileann Ní Dhúill (violin)
  - Aoife Nic Athlaoich (cello)
  - Karen Dervan (viola)
