= St. Mary's Church, Kilmore, County Wexford =

Church of St. Mary, Kilmore
- Church of St. Mary, Kilmore
- 52.2036°N 6.5505°W
- Country: Ireland
- Denomination: Roman Catholic

History
- Dedication: St. Mary

Architecture
- Architect: William Day
- Architectural type: Gothic revival
- Completed: 1802, 1889, 1898, 1935

Administration
- Diocese: Diocese of Ferns

St. Mary's Roman Catholic Church is the parish church of Kilmore, County Wexford in the southeast of Ireland. Dating to the early 19th century, it has been included on the Record of Protected Structures by Wexford County Council.

== History ==
The church was built to designs of William Day between 1798 and 1802. Later additions include a tower in 1889, an annexe in 1898, and a later vestry in 1935. Some of the later additions are attributed to the architect Thomas Joseph Cullen (1879-1947), with the stained glass in the east window (dated to 1884) attributed to the stained-glass artist Lucien-Léopold Lobin (1837–92).

== Choral tradition ==
A tradition of carol singing, at Christmas, has taken place locally since the mid 18th century. The carols, written in the Yola language, have been "sung without a break" since they were introduced to the parish by Very Rev. Peter Devereux, who was parish priest c. 1751. Some of the songs were written by Very Rev. William Devereux, P.P., Piercestown, a native of Tacumshane, where he is buried, while others were written by Bishop Luke Waddinge of Ferns. In all, there are thirteen carols, eight of which are usually sung during the Christmas period, the first at first Mass on Christmas Day and the last one on Sunday nearest Twelfth Day.
