= Heresy Records =

Record label

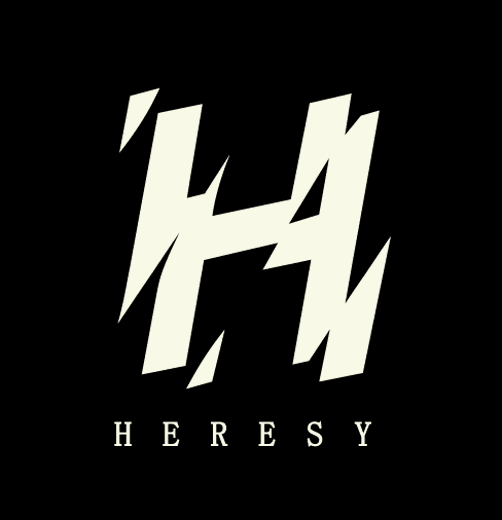
- Irish independent label Heresy Records
- Founded: 2012
- Founder: Eric Fraad
- Distributor: Naxos (Worldwide)
- Genre: Classical Music
- Location: Dublin
- Official website: Heresy Records website

Heresy Records is an independent classical record label based in Dublin.

== History ==
Heresy Records was founded by American opera director Eric Fraad. The label specializes in Early music, Traditional Irish music, World music, Contemporary music and a synthesis of these genres. Heresy Records is known for its unconventional approach to cover art design. It is distributed worldwide by Naxos.

Heresy’s recording of The Wexford Carols, produced by Joe Henry and featuring singers, Caitríona O’Leary, Tom Jones, Rosanne Cash and Rhiannon Giddens reached #1 on the Billboard World Music Chart in 2015.

Heresy’s New York-based imprint, Isotopia Records focuses on diverse styles of popular music.

== Repertoire ==
Composers featured on Heresy Records albums include John Dowland, William Lawes, Henry Lawes, John Ward, Antonio de Salazar, Gaspar Fernandes, Sebastián Durón, Hildegard of Bingen, Guillaume Dufay, Santiago de Murcia, John Cage, Morton Feldman, Roger Doyle, Ian Wilson, Scott Wollschleger, Linda Buckley, Donnacha Dennehy, Enda Bates, and Daniel Figgis.

== Select Discography ==
- Shipwrecked (2012) - eX Early Music Ensemble
- Ecstasy (2012) - Caitríona O'Leary and Dúlra
- Motion of the Heart (2012) - The Dublin Drag Orchestra
- Possessed (2013) - eX Early Music Ensemble
- On the Nature of Electricity and Acoustics - various (2013)
- Sleepsongs (2014) - Caitríona O'Leary and Dúlra
- The Transcendentalist (2014) - Ivan Ilić
- The Wexford Carols (2014) -Caitríona O'Leary, Tom Jones (singer), Rosanne Cash, Rhiannon Giddens, and Joe Henry.
- Time Machine (2015) - Roger Doyle
- A Map of the Kingdom of Ireland (2018) - Various Artists compiled by Eric Fraad
- Heresy (2018) - Roger Doyle

== See also ==
- ECM Records
- Naïve Records
- Nonesuch Records
