= Terence Dolan =

Irish lexicographer and radio personality (1943–2019)

- Born: 8 April 1943; London, England
- Died: 20 April 2019 (aged 76)

Terence Dolan (8 April 1943 – 20 April 2019) was an Irish lexicographer and radio personality. He was professor of Old and Middle English in the School of English and Drama at University College Dublin. He acted as the School's Research Co-ordinator, and was the director of the Hiberno-English Archive website. He appeared weekly on Seán Moncrieff's radio show (Mondays) on Newstalk 106. Podcasts of his appearances are available from Newstalk's website.

== Life ==
Dolan was born in London of Irish parents, both of whom hailed from County Cavan. He was formerly a Hastings Senior Scholar of The Queen's College, Oxford. He was twice the National Endowment for the Humanities Distinguished Visiting Professor of the Humanities, University of Richmond, Virginia (in 1986 and 1992). He was a director of the international James Joyce summer school, Dublin. He is perhaps best known for his Dictionary of Hiberno-English which gives a comprehensive account of the English language as it is spoken in Ireland.

== Illness and death ==
Dolan suffered a stroke in February 2008, and began a period of recuperation. He left Tallaght Hospital on 15 December 2008. He talked to Seán Moncrieff's about this experience, and also about the origins of medical words and about writing a book about the first hand experience of having a stroke and the recovery. He died on 20 April 2019.

== Research interests ==
Dolan performed research in medieval English literature, Hiberno-English, lexicography, and James Joyce.

== Selected publications ==
- Dolan, T. P., 1998. A Dictionary of Hiberno-English: The Irish Use of English. Dublin: Gill & Macmillan, 1999 (paperback).
- Dolan, T. P., 2004. 'Is the Best English Spoken in Lower Drumcondra?', in A New & Complex Sensation: Essays on Joyce's Dubliners (ed.) Oona Frawley, 1–9, Dublin: Lilliput Press.
- Dolan, T.P., The Compilation of A Dictionary of Hiberno-English Reviewed: Proceedings of the 2002 Symposium on Lexicography, University of Copenhagen.
- Dolan, T. P., 2003. 'The English Language in an Irish Context' in Millennium Essays (ed. Michaeil Cronin).
- Dolan, T. P., 2002. ‘Language Policy in the Republic of Ireland’ in Language Planning and Education (eds. J. M. Kirk & D. P. Ó Baoill) Belfast 144–156.
- Dolan, T. P., 2002. ‘Devolution and Cultural Policy: A View from the Republic of Ireland’, in Ireland (Ulster) Scotland: Concepts, Contexts, Comparisons (eds. E. Longley, E. Hughes, & D. O’Rawe) Belfast, 50–53.
- Dolan, T. P., 2003, 'The Theft of Joyce', James Joyce Bloomsday Magazine 33–35.
- Dolan, T. P., 1999. 'Writing in Ireland', in The Cambridge History of Medieval English Literature (ed. David Wallace). Cambridge University Press, 208–228.
- Dolan, T. P. (ed.). 1990. 'The English of the Irish'. Special Issue: The Irish University Review, vol. 20, no. 1.
- Dolan T. P. & Diarmuid O Muirthile, 1996. The Dialect of Forth and Bargy, Co. Wexford, Ireland. Dublin: Four Courts Press.
- Dolan, T. P., 1991. 'Language in Ulysses' in Studies on Joyce's Ulysses. Jacqueline Genet—Elisabeth Hellegouarc'h (eds.). 131–142. Caen: G.D.R. d'Etudes anglo-irlandaises, Université de Caen.
- Dolan, T. P., 1990. 'The Language of Dubliners' in James Joyce: The Artist and the Labyrinth. Augustine Martin (ed.), 25–40. London: Ryan Publishing.
- Dolan, T. P., 1985. 'Sean O'Casey's Use of Hiberno-English' in Irland: Gesellschaft und Kultur IV. D. Siegmund-Schultze (ed.). 108–115. Halle-Wittenberg: Martin-Luther Universität.
- Dolan, T. P., 1991. 'The Literature of Norman Ireland' in The Field Day Anthology of Irish Writing. Seamus Deane (ed.), vol. 1, Derry: Field Day Publications.
- Dolan T. P., 1994. 'Samuel Beckett's Dramatic Use of Hiberno-English', Irish University Review, 14, 45–56.

== Radio appearances ==
- 2002–Presenter, RTÉ Radio Series: 'Talking Proper: The English of the Irish'.
- 2002 – Contributor, RTÉ Radio Series, 'The Odd Word'.
- 2002 – 'Hiberno-English Lexicography', University of Joensuu, Finland.
- 2002 – 'Hiberno-English in Translation', University of São Paulo, Brazil.
- 2002 – 'The Compilation of A Dictionary of Hiberno-English Reviewed' University of Copenhagen.
- 2002 – 'Hiberno-English in the Context of Globalisation and Immigration', Ross Institute, East Hampton, New York.
- 2002 – 'Language Policy in the Republic of Ireland', Queen's University, Belfast.
- 1999 – 'Dictionary Joyce: Joyce and Lexicography', James Joyce Centre, Dublin.
- 1998 – 'The Compilation of a Dictionary of Hiberno-English', University of Potsdam.
- 1996 – For the Translation Service of the European Commission, in Brussels and Luxembourg. 'Why and How the Irish Speak English' ( to mark Ireland's Presidency of the European Commission ).
- 1992 – 'English and Irish in Competition', Jefferson Smurfit Fellowship Lecture, University of Missouri-Rolla.
