= Ballycogley =

Ballycogley Baile Uí Choigligh
- Townland
- Location in Ireland
- Coordinates: 52°14′46″N 6°28′45″W
- Country: Ireland
- County: County Wexford

Ballycogley (Irish: Baile Uí Choigligh) is a large townland located 8 miles from Wexford town, in Ireland. It plays host to one of Europe's highest water towers, as well as a proposed wind farm. The townland social life revolves around the two pubs - the Halfway House and the Hitching Post.

Ballycogley has been a haven for devotees of heavy metal and rock over the years. In the late eighties and early nineties, it was the host of several 'biker' festivals and events. In recent years, the Halfway House has become a regular venue for local rock bands, and many a musician's career has begun in Ballycogley.

== Notable Figures ==
- Luke Wadding, Bishop of Ferns and important author of Christian poetry was born in Ballcogley Castle in 1628. He related to the more well-known theologian Luke Wadding, and his predecessor to the bishopric of Ferns, Nicholas French.
