= William Day (architect) =

Irish architect

- Born: 1742; Gallagh, County Wexford
- Died: 1827 (aged 84–85); County Wexford
- Occupations: architect, builder
- Known for: St. Mary's Church, Kilmore, County Wexford

William Day (1742–1827) was an Irish architect and builder active in the southeast of Ireland in the late eighteenth and early nineteenth century.

He was related to architects John Day and Martin Day, both of County Wexford. His only known design was for the replacement St. Mary's Church of Ireland Church, Kilmore, County Wexford (1798–1802), although he was not responsible for the tower (1889), annexe (1898), and later vestry (1935).

Day died at "Garlough", County Wexford in 1827.
