= John Day (architect) =

- Born: Gallagh, County Wexford
- Occupations: Architect, Builder,

John Day (fl. 1798–1802) was an Irish architect and builder active in the southeast of Ireland in the nineteenth century. He was related to architects William Day and Martin Day, both of County Wexford.
