= Martin Day (architect) =

Irish architect in the 19th century

- Born: Gallagh, County Wexford
- Died: 1861
- Occupations: architect, builder
- Known for: architect and/or builder of many Church of Ireland churches

Martin Day (died 1861) was an Irish architect and builder active in early to mid-nineteenth-century County Wexford and County Waterford, in the southeast of Ireland. He is credited with the only surviving example of Hindu-Gothic architecture in Ireland, the Dromana Gate, Villierstown.

== Career ==
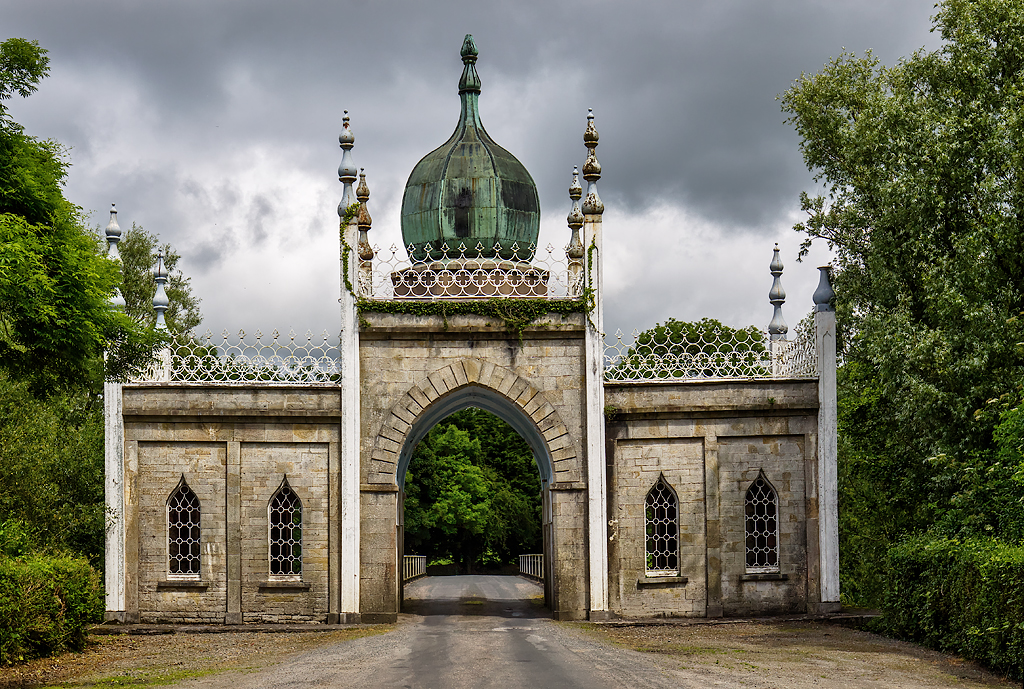
Dromana Gate, Villierstown by Day

He was related to architects John Day and William Day, both of County Wexford, and connected with Richard Purcell, who was possibly a relative. He was notable in designing several Church of Ireland churches for the Board of First Fruits and the Irish Ecclesiastical Commissioners between around 1822 and 1849.

He assisted Daniel Robertson at Ballinkeele, Johnstown Castle, Bloomfield and Castleboro House in County Wexford. At Castleboro House, drawings of the neo-palladian Porter's Lodge are signed by Day.

Day is believed to have designed the only surviving example of Hindu-Gothic architecture in Ireland, the Dromana Gate at Dromana Estate near Villierstown, County Waterford. It was built around 1849, and replaced a temporary folly made of wood, canvas, and papier-mâché inspired by the North Gate at the Royal Pavilion that was erected for the wedding of Henry Villiers-Stuart and Theresia Pauline Ott.

He designed without collaboration other country houses of less importance. Day died in 1861.
