= Martyn Day =

Martyn Day may refer to:

- Martyn Day (lawyer), British lawyer
- Martyn Day (politician) (born 1971), Scottish politician
