= ZFSP-FM =

Radio station on Grand Cayman in the Cayman Islands

ZFBB-FM
- George Town, Cayman Islands; Cayman Islands
- Broadcast area: Grand Cayman, Cayman Islands
- Frequency: 94.9 MHz
- Branding: GOLD 94.9

Programming
- Format: Oldies

Ownership
- Owner: Compass Media Ltd
- Sister stations: Z99 FM ROOSTER 101 ISLAND FM

History
- First air date: 30 December 2004
- Former call signs: ZFSP-FM (2004–2016)

Technical information
- Transmitter coordinates: 19°18′N 81°23′W

Links
- Webcast: http://www.bobfm.ky/player
- Website: http://www.bobfm.ky/

ZFSP-FM, or GOLD 94.9 (94.9 FM), is a radio station located on the island of Grand Cayman in the Cayman Islands, a British Overseas Territory. The station's license was issued on 15 December 2004, The station, originally owned by Paramount Media Services, aired a dance music format. "Spin 94.9," as it was originally named, often featured disc jockeys that also entertained in nightclubs across the Cayman Islands.

In February 2016 ZFSP became Bob 94.9 and changed their format to oldies. Currently, Compass Media owns the station along with 3 others.

Former logo
