= Diarmaid Ó Muirithe =

Irish lexicographer, journalist and author

- Born: 11 November 1935; New Ross, County Wexford, Ireland
- Died: 11 July 2014 (aged 78); Vienna, Austria
- Education: Trinity College Dublin; National University of Ireland
- Occupations: Lexicographer, journalist, author

Diarmaid Ó Muirithe (11 November 1935 – 11 July 2014) was an Irish lexicographer, journalist and author.

== Biography ==
Ó Muirithe was born in New Ross, County Wexford, attending Trinity College Dublin and the National University of Ireland, before working as a primary school teacher, a freelance writer, and newsroom journalist at RTÉ. He later became a senior lecturer in Irish at University College Dublin, as well as a Fulbright Professor of English in the United States, as well as chair of Irish Studies in St Mary's University, Halifax, Canada. Maurice Manning described Ó Muirithe as "an internationally respected expert on dialect based on his knowledge of English dialect and what has now been recognised as a distinct field of study, Hiberno-English".

Ó Muirithe came to wider public notice in 1991, when Irish Times editor Conor Brady asked him to submit "a few pieces" on Irish, which became the regular column Words We Use. The columns were later collected into a short series of books. The column ran until December 2013. It focused on the etymologies of words used in Ireland:

The English we speak in Ireland has been influenced by Latin, Old Norse, Norman French, Scots, the English dialects and, of course, Irish. So the words we use in Ireland reflect the social history of the island. It is an extraordinarily rich language.

He died in and was buried in Vienna, where he had lived with his second wife.

Poet Séamus Heaney called him a "[k]eeper of Ireland’s word-hoard".

== Select bibliography ==
- The Dialect of Forth and Bargy, with Terence Dolan
- The Wexford Carols, 1982
- The Folklore of County Wexford, with Deirdre Nuttall)
- A-Z of Irish Names for Children, 2007
- From the Viking word-hoard A dictionary of Scandinavian words in the languages of Britain and Ireland, 2010
- Words We Don't Use (Much Anymore), 2012
- A supplement to the dictionary of Scandinavian words in the languages of Britain and Ireland, 2013
- A dictionary of Anglo-Irish: Words and phrases from Gaelic in the English of Ireland, 2013
- Last Words
