= Kilmore, County Wexford =

Village in County Wexford, Ireland

Kilmore An Chill Mhór
- Village
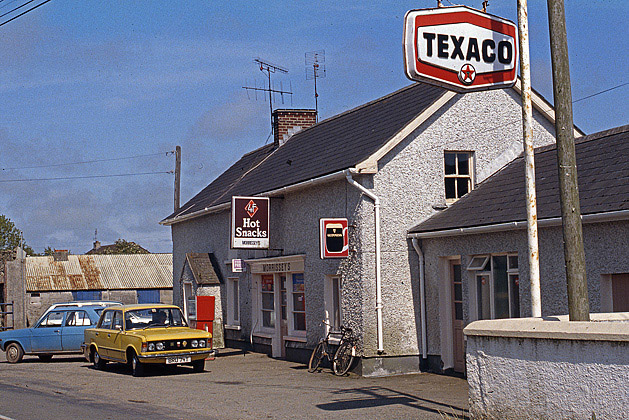
- Pub in Kilmore in 1979

- Location in Ireland
- Coordinates: 52°12′21″N 6°32′59″W
- Country: Ireland
- Province: Leinster
- County: County Wexford

Population (2016)
  - Total: 132

Kilmore or Killmore (Irish: an Chill Mhór, meaning 'the big church'), locally pronounced 'Kilmoor', is a village in south County Wexford, Ireland, about 16 kilometres (9.9 mi) from Wexford town. Kilmore is in a civil parish of the same name.

== History ==
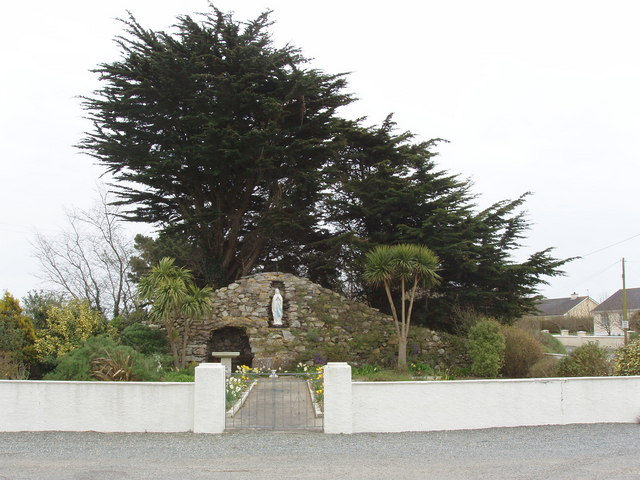
Marian shrine south of Kilmore

The village's English name, Kilmore, derives from the Irish An Chill Mhór, meaning "big church". According to mid-19th century sources, its Yola language name was Kilmoor.

Evidence of ancient settlement in the area includes a number of ringfort sites in the surrounding townlands of Sarshill, Lannagh and Rickardstown. An ecclesiastical enclosure, in the townland of Grange, contains the former parish church of Kilmore. The ruined church, which is "probably of early origin", contains a number of early 17th century memorials. The existing church within the village, St. Mary's Roman Catholic church, dates to 1802.

The Kilmore Carols, a tradition of carol singing at St. Mary's RC Church in Kilmore, has taken place at Christmas time since the 1750s. In all, there are thirteen carols, eight of which are sung during the Christmas period, the first at first Mass on Christmas Day and the last one on Sunday nearest Twelfth Day.

== Public transport ==
Wexford Bus operate several services a day (not Sundays) between Wexford and Kilmore Quay via Johnstown Castle, Bridgetown and Kilmore.

== See also ==
- List of towns and villages in Ireland
