= Caitríona O'Leary =

Irish singer

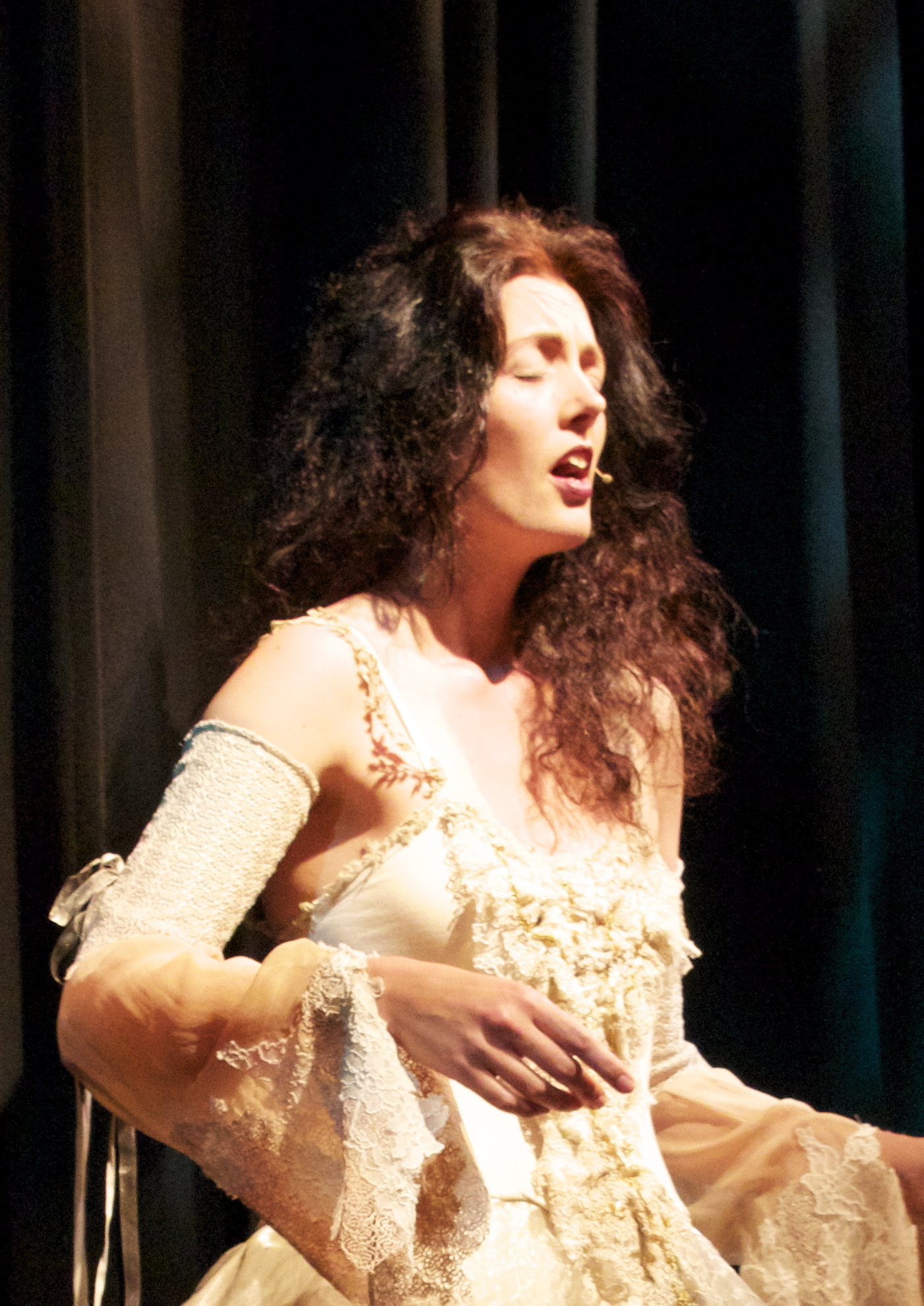
- Caitríona O'Leary in 2020

Background information
- Born: Donegal, Ireland
- Genres: Folk, traditional Irish, Early Music
- Occupation: Musician
- Instrument: Vocals
- Years active: 1988–present
- Labels: Heresy Records, BMG, EMI
- Website: www.caitrionaoleary.com

Caitríona O'Leary (born 1969) is an Irish singer, composer, and arranger. She is known internationally for performances of traditional Irish music, early music, folk music, contemporary music, and her own work.

Called a “national treasure” by the Sunday Business Post and the “world’s leading early-music avant-gardist” by AUDIO Magazine, her recordings have met with broad critical acclaim. Her recording of The Wexford Carols, the result of many years of her researching and reconstructing traditional Irish Christmas songs and then teaming up with producer Joe Henry, guest singers Tom Jones, Rosanne Cash, and Rhiannon Giddens, and an all-star band featuring Dónal Lunny, Greg Cohen, reached #1 on the Billboard and Amazon charts. Her follow up album, Strange Wonders, The Wexford Carols Volume II, was produced by Ethan Johns and Dom Monks and featured guest performers Alison Balsom, Olov Johansson, Seth Lakeman, and Clara Sanabras.

The COVID pandemic and resulting lack of public performances led to filmic collaborations with director Eric Fraad - Love’s Fever, Island of Saints, and Day Six, all film versions of her musical projects.

== Discography ==
- Dido and Aeneas (1994, Vox Classics)
- Saints – Sequentia (1996, BMG/Deutsche Harmonia Mundi)
- Shining Light – Sequentia (1996, BMG/Deutsche Harmonia Mundi)
- Aquitania – Sequentia (1997, BMG/Deutsche Harmonia Mundi)
- Carolan's Harp – The Harp Consort (1997, BMG/Deutsche Harmonia Mundi)
- Ludus Danielis – The Harp Consort (1998, BMG/Deutsche Harmonia Mundi)
- La Púrpura de la Rosa – The Harp Consort (1999, BMG/Deutsche Harmonia Mundi)
- Dúil, Irish Songs of Love and Nature – O’Leary and Dúlra (2000 EMI/Virgin Classics)
- I am Stretched on your Grave – O’Leary and Dúlra (2001, BMG/Deutsche Harmonia Mundi)
- Miracles of Notre Dame – The Harp Consort (2003, BMG/Deutsche Harmonia Mundi)
- Magdalena, Medieval Songs for Mary Magdalen – Joglaresa (2004, Avie)
- Ecstasy – O’Leary and Dúlra (2012, Heresy Records/Naxos)
- Shipwrecked – eX Early Music Ensemble (2012, Heresy Records/Naxos)
- Motion of the Heart & Viva Frida – The Dublin Drag Orchestra (2012, Heresy Records/Naxos)
- Possessed – eX Early Music Ensemble (2013, Heresy Records/Naxos)
- Sleepsongs – O’Leary and Dúlra (2014, Heresy Records/Naxos)
- The Wexford Carols with Tom Jones and others (2014)
- Strange Wonders, the Wexford Carols, Vol.2 (2021, Heresy Records)
