= Rathangan, County Wexford =

Rathangan Ráth Daingean
- Village
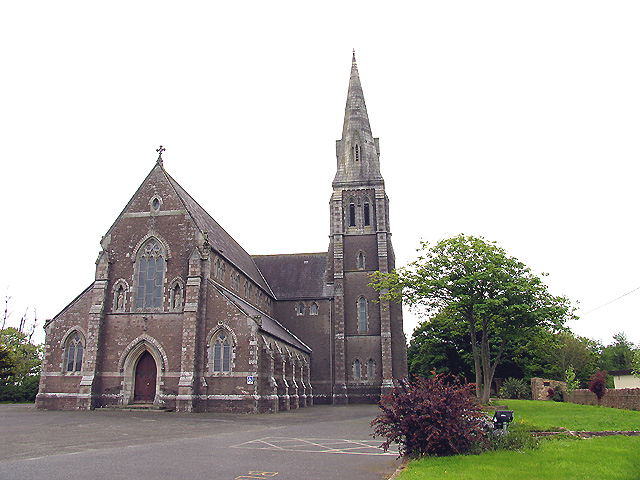
- Church of The Assumption and St. Laurence O'Toole, Rathangan

- Location in Ireland
- Coordinates: 52°13′59″N 6°37′01″W
- Country: Ireland
- Province: Leinster
- County: Wexford
- Time zone: UTC+0 (WET)
  - Summer (DST): UTC-1 (IST (WEST))
- Area code: 051

Rathangan (Irish: Ráth Daingean, meaning 'ringfort fortress') is a small village and townland in the south of County Wexford in Ireland. The village of Duncormick is nearby.

The local Catholic church dates from 1873 and is constructed of red sandstone with granite dressings. There is a graveyard alongside the church.

The national (primary) school in Rathangan, St Anne's National School, had over 260 pupils enrolled in 2025. The community hall, Rathangan Hall, is close to the church and school.

Rathangan's Gaelic Athletic Association (GAA) club fields both hurling and Gaelic football teams. The grounds of St Anne's GAA Club include three pitches and an astro-turf surface.

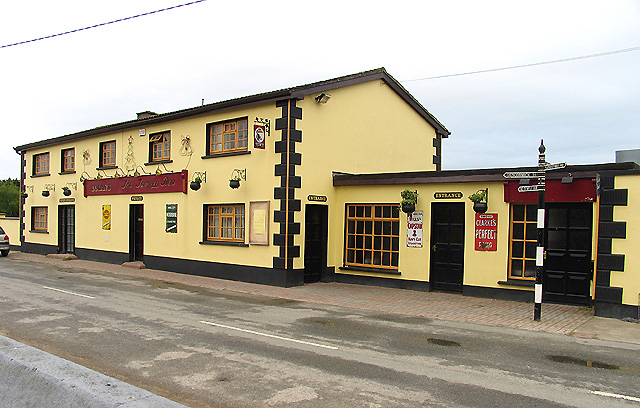
The Temple Bar, now the Rathangan Bar, in Rathangan

== See also ==
- List of towns and villages in Ireland
