= Nóirín Ní Riain =

Irish singer (born 1951)

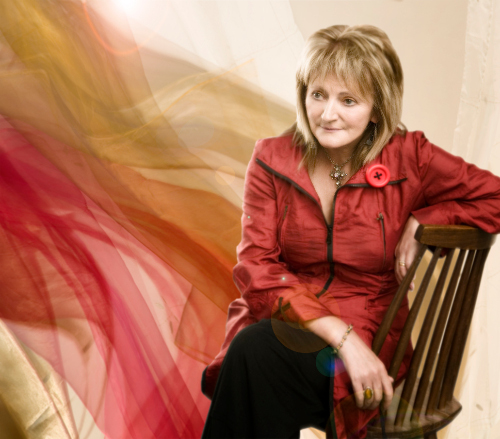
- 2014 or earlier

Background information
- Born: Nora Mary Antoinette Ryan (Irish: Nóra Máire Antoinette Ní Riain)
- Origin: Caherconlish, County Limerick, Ireland
- Genres: Irish traditional; folk; celtic; Gregorian chant
- Instruments: Vocals; surpeti; Irish whistle; piano
- Years active: 1977–present
- Labels: Daisy Discs (Ireland); Gael Linn (Ireland); Sounds True Inc. (United States)
- Website: www.noirin.love

Nóirín Ní Riain (born Nora Mary Antoinette Ryan, 12 June 1951) is an Irish singer, writer, teacher, theologian, and authority on Gregorian Chant (plainchant, plainsong). She is primarily known for spiritual songs, but also sings Celtic music, sean-nós and Indian songs. Nóirín plays an Indian harmonium (surpeti), shruti box and feadóg (whistle). She was Artist-in-Residence for Wexford and Laois. She performs with her sons Eoin and Mícheál Ó Súilleabháin under the name A.M.E.N. and gives workshops about "Sound as a Spiritual Experience".

== Biography ==
Born in Caherconlish, County Limerick, Ní Riain studied music at University College Cork (UCC), specialising in religious music for post-graduate work. She developed as a performer, focusing particularly on religious, Irish traditional, and international religious music.

She has performed worldwide. Notable events include: the International Peace Gathering at Costa Rica to introduce the XIV Dalai Lama in 1989, the United Nations summit at Rio de Janeiro 1992, the European Cultural Month at Kraków, Poland 1992, the UN Earth Summit in Copenhagen 1995, The 40th Eurovision Song Contest 1995, and the World Women Summit in Beijing 1995. She has performed in the Royal Festival Hall with Sinéad O'Connor, with the American composer John Cage, with the sons of Karlheinz Stockhausen (Markus and Simon), with Paul Winter at summer and winter solstice concerts in the Cathedral of St John the Divine in New York, and with the Scola Gregoriana of Notre Dame University, Indiana, where she performed the leading role in Anima, by Hildegard von Bingen. She sang several times in India as a delegate of the Irish government, and performed in Sarajevo.

She was married to the pianist and composer Mícheál Ó Súilleabháin.

The Cork singer and teacher at UCC, Pilib Ó Laoghaire (1910–1976) persuaded her to become a singer instead of studying law, and taught her Irish traditional sean-nós singing. At UCC, she studied under Aloys Fleischmann and Seán Ó Riada.

As a child, Ní Riain often visited Glenstal Abbey in Murroe to listen to the chants of the Benedictine monks. Later she performed and made several recordings with them, under which the trilogy: Vox Clamantis in Deserto (Caoineadh na Maighdine), Vox Populi (Good People All) and Vox de Nube (A Voice from the Cloud).

She has a PhD in theology, from Mary Immaculate College (University of Limerick). Her thesis was "The Specificity of Christian Theosony", an in-depth study and representation of sounds – primarily vocal sounds – as a means to religious experience from a Christian perspective.

On 29 July 2017, she was ordained as the Rev Nóirín Ní Riain, minister in the One Spirit Inter Faith Seminary Foundation, and performs wedding, naming and divorce ceremonies.

== Discography ==
=== Solo albums ===
- 1978 – Seinn Aililiú, Gael-Linn.
- 1980 – Caoineadh na Maighdine, Gael-Linn.
- 1982 – Darkest Midnight, Glenstal Records.
- 1988 – Stór Amhrán, Ossian Publications Ltd.
- 1989 – Vox de Nube, Gael-Linn.
- 1990 – Nóirín Ní Riain with The Monks of Glenstal Abbey, CBS Records.
- 1993 – Soundings, Ossian Publications Ltd.
- 1996 – River of Stars, Audio Book, Sounds True Inc.
- 1996 – Celtic Soul, Earth Music Productions.
- 1997 – Gregorian Chant Experience, The O'Brian Press Ltd.
- 2004 – Mystical Ireland, Sounds True Inc.
- 2004 – Biscantorat: Sound of the Spirit from Glenstal Abbey (CD), Hummingbird Records.
- 2004 – Biscantorat: Sound of the Spirit from Glenstal Abbey (DVD), Hummingbird Records.

=== Ní Riain & Sons ===
Nóirín has released two albums with her sons Eoin and Mícheál Ó Súilleabháin under the name 'Amen'. Ní Riain's sons are also well known as Irish pop band size2shoes.

- 2007 – Amen, Nóirín Ní Riain & Sons, The Daisy Label; RMG Chart Entertainment Ltd.
- 2008 – Celtic Joy, Nóirín Ní Riain with Eoin and Mícheál Ó Súilleabháin, Gemini Sun label; Sounds True Inc., (US release of 'Amen')
- 2013 – Hearth Sound, Ancient Songs from Ireland and the World, Nóirín Ní Riain with Owen and Moley Ó Súilleabháin, NNR Recordings. (iTunes)

=== Guest roles / collaborations ===
- 1977 – Óró Damhnaigh, Mícheál Ó Súilleabháin, Gael-Linn.
- 1984 – James Last at St. Patrick's Cathedral, Dublin, Polydor.
- 1992 – Solstice Live, Paul Winter, Earth Music Productions.
- 1994 – Sieben Psalmen, Meditation in Wort und Klang, Markus & Simon Stockhausen, Pater Friedhelm Mennekes, EMI Classics.
- 1996 – Lumen, Mícheál Ó Súilleabháin, European Song Contest, Virgin Records.
- 1997 – Illumination, Richard Souther, Sony.
- 1997 – Agnes Browne, Anjelica Huston, Hell's Kitchen Films/October Films.
- 2001 – In deiner Nähe, Close to you, Markus Stockhausen, Aktivraum.
- 2008 – Sanctuary, Various Artists, Independent.

=== Albums produced ===
- 2007 – In Praise of Mary, The Cistercian Nuns of St. Mary's Abbey Glencairn, The Daisy Label.

== Bibliography ==
- 1985 – The Female Song in the Irish Tradition in: Irish Women, Image and Achievement ed. Eiléan Ní Chuilleanáin, Arlen House, p. 73–84.
- 1987 – Im Bim Babaro, Rabhcáin do Leanaí, Children's Songs from the Irish Tradition, The Mercier Press.
- 1988 – Stór Amhrán, A Wealth of Songs from the Irish Tradition, Ossian Publications Ltd. (reprint 2007)
- 1993 – The nature and classification of traditional religious songs in Irish with a survey of printed and oral sources in: Music in the church, edited by Gerard Gillen & Harry White, Blackrock, Co. Dublin: Irish Academic Press.
- 1997 – Gregorian Chant Experience, Sing and Meditate with Nóirín Ní Riain, The O'Brian Press Ltd.
- 1998 – Sacred Moments, A Photographic Journey by Valerie O'Sullivan, 1998, Veritas Publications, p. 94–97.
- 1999 – The Whoseday Book, A Millennium Journal, page 11.07.2000, The Irish Hospice Foundation.
- 1999 – Digging for Sound in the Celtic Tradition, Nóirín Ní Riain, Celtic Threads, Exploring the Wisdom of Our Heritage, edited by Padraigín Clancy, Veritas Publications, p. 119–129.
- 2000 – And Deep Things Are Song in Frankie Armstrong: Well-Tuned Women, The Women's Press.
- 2001 – The Sound of God in Anáil Dé – The Breath of God (edited by Helen Phelan), Veritas, p. 177–189.
- 2005 – Towards a Theology of Listening in Spirituality, Vol.2, No. 62, p. 286–290, Dominican Publications.
- 2006 – Bringing It All Back Home: The Retrieval of Gregorian/Plainchant and the Forgotten Sense in: Time [to] Change (edited by Joseph Putti), Veritas, p. 170–186.
- 2009 – The Ear of the Heart: Weaving a Tapestry of Transformative Listening in Song and Story in: Intimacy – Venturing the Uncertainties of the heart, Jungian Odyssey Series Volume I, Spring Journal, Louisiana, USA, p. 9–14.
- 2009 – Listen with the Ear of the Heart: An Autobiography, Veritas Publications.
- 2011 – Theosony, Towards a Theology of Listening, Columba Press.
- 2023 – Sacred Rituals, Hachette Press.

== Sources ==
- Alive in God's World. Human Life on Earth and in Heaven as described in the Visions of Joa Bolendas (Lindisfarne Books, 1997), p. 21–22.
- Mairéid Sullivan: Celtic Women in Music. A Celebration of Beauty and Sovereignty (Quarry Press, 1999), p. 159–169.
- "Spiritual Memories by John O'Regan", in: Irish Music Magazine vol. 3 no 5 (December 1997/January 1998), p. 84–85.
- "The Theology of listening by Michael Walsh", in: The Irish Eyes, spring 2006.
